= United States energy law =

Function of federal and other governments

United States energy law is a function of the federal government, states, and local governments. At the federal level, it is regulated extensively through the United States Department of Energy. Every state, the federal government, and the District of Columbia collect some motor vehicle excise taxes. Specifically, these are excise taxes on gasoline, diesel fuel, and gasohol. While many western states rely a great deal on severance taxes on oil, gas, and mineral production for revenue, most states get a relatively small amount of their revenue from such sources.

The practice of energy law has been the domain of law firms working on behalf of utility companies, rather than legal scholars or other legal actors (such as private lawyers and paralegals), especially in Texas, but this is changing. Some officials from energy agencies may take jobs in the utilities or other companies they regulate, such as the former FERC chairman did in 2008.

The American Bar Association (ABA) has a Section of Environment, Energy, and Resources, which is a "forum for lawyers working in areas related to environmental law, natural resources law, and energy law." The Section houses several substantive committees on environmental and energy law that release current information on topics of interest to practitioners and news of committee activities. The ABA recognized 'environmental and energy law' as one of the practice areas where legal work may be found in 2009.

The United States' oil production peaked in February 2020, at about 18,826,000 barrels per day.

== Common law ==
Under the common law, persons who owned real property owned "from the depths to the heavens". Therefore, real estate traditionally has included all rights to water, oil, gas, and other minerals underground. The United States Supreme Court has held that as far as air rights, "this doctrine has no place in the modern world," but it remains as a source of law to this day, or "fundamental to property rights in land."

An easement or license to drill for oil, gas, or minerals generally runs with the land, and thus is an appurtenant easement. However, a utility easement generally runs with the owner of the easement, rather than running with the land, and as such, is an example of an easement in gross.

The West digest system, used in WestLaw, has allocated several topics in energy law:

- 114 – Customs duties
- 145 – Electricity
- 190 – Gas
- 371 – Taxation.

There are many library research resources available about American oil and gas law.

=== Supreme Court cases ===
The Supreme Court of the United States rarely rules on energy law, but they do so when the Circuits are split, or in other particular circumstances. In the vast majority of cases, the rule of four requires that at least four Justices agree to issue a writ of certiorari.

On July 18, 2025, the Supreme Court held in Nuclear Regulatory Commission v. Texas that only a party who has been directly harmed in a licensing proceeding before the Nuclear Regulatory Commission can seek judicial review of such a licensing decision. The State of Texas and a company sought judicial review of the NRC's decision to issue a license to a company that applied for license to deal with nuclear material. Texas and the other company filed comments in the proceeding and opposed issuance of the license. They sought judicial review and the 5th Circuit, usually eager to oblige the government of Texas, vacated the license, and NRC petitioned the court." Kavanaugh's majority decision was not joined by all conservatives, but was joined by Chief Justice Roberts and the three liberal justices; Gorsuch wrote a minority opinion dissenting with Thomas and Alito.

== Federal laws ==
Under the Stock-Raising Homestead Act, the surface and below-surface rights are divided, known as split estates.

Previous to the 1920s, the role of the federal government in energy was restricted to the disposition of oil, gas, and coal on federal lands. The Mineral Leasing Act of 1920 30 U.S.C. § 181 et seq. is the major federal law that authorizes and governs leasing of public lands for developing deposits of hydrocarbons and other minerals. Previous to the act, these materials were subject to mining claims under the General Mining Act of 1872. In BP America Production Co. v. Burton, 549 U.S. 84 (2006), the Supreme Court held that a statute of limitations does not apply to government actions for contract claims for an agency to recover royalties on such leases.

Concerned that a predicted imminent shortage of petroleum would not leave enough fuel for naval vessels, President William Howard Taft established the first Naval Petroleum Reserve by withdrawing federal land over the Elk Hills Oil Field in California from being claimed and drilled by private companies. A number of additional Naval Petroleum Reserves and Naval Oil Shale Reserves were established by Taft and his successor, Woodrow Wilson.

Until the 1920s, "the federal government did not play an active role in the energy industries," sometimes explained as due to "the widespread belief in the unlimited supply of energy." The first US law was the Federal Power Act of 1920 (later amended in 1935 and 1986). The Manhattan Project of the 1940s "initiated the era of nuclear regulation." In 1946, the Atomic Energy Act was passed. Atomic Energy Act of 1954 amended it, and has been the subject of at least seven Supreme Court cases.

The Price-Anderson Nuclear Industries Indemnity Act was first enacted in 1957, and has been renewed periodically, which governs a no-fault insurance regime for nuclear accidents. The statute was upheld as constitutional in Duke Power Co. v. Carolina Environmental Study Group, 438 U.S. 59 (1978).

In response to the OPEC oil embargo, Congress passed the Energy Reorganization Act of 1974 and the Energy Policy and Conservation Act in 1975. After natural gas shortages in 1976-1977, Congress passed the Natural Gas Policy Act of 1978.

The Department of Energy and its constituent Federal Energy Regulatory Commission (FERC) were created in 1977, through the Department of Energy Organization Act. The stated purposes of these "federal energy laws and regulations is to provide affordable energy by sustaining competitive markets, while protecting the economic, environmental, and security interests of the United States." The U.S. Nuclear Regulatory Commission (NRC) regulates the use of nuclear power and its uses as a defense weaponry.

Other statutes are the Public Utility Regulatory Policies Act, the Energy Security Act, the Price-Anderson Nuclear Industries Indemnity Act, and the Energy Policy Act of 1992 Most of these laws are codified at U.S. Code, Title 16, Chapter 12 – Federal regulation and development of power. The Commodity Futures Modernization Act of 2000 also affects energy trading companies. The Oil Pollution Act of 1973 and Oil Pollution Act of 1990 affect the transportation of oil on the high seas.

As of January 1, 2008, the federal excise tax was 18.3 cents per gallon on gasoline, 24.3 cents per gallon on diesel, and 13 cents per gallon on gasohol, all of which goes into the Highway Trust Fund.

=== Energy Policy Act of 2005 ===
One major law is the Energy Policy Act of 2005, an attempt to combat growing energy problems, which changed the energy policy of the United States by providing tax incentives and loan guarantees for energy production of various types. There were various criticisms of the Act. One of the most controversial provisions of that Act was to change daylight saving time by four to five weeks, depending upon the year; some scholars have questioned whether daylight saving results in a net energy savings. It also directs a study for the development of oil shale and tar sands resources on public lands especially in Colorado, Utah, and Wyoming. The Act further sets Federal reliability standards regulating the electrical grid (done in response to the Blackout of 2003), including allowing the DOE to designate National Interest Electric Transmission Corridors in low-capacity areas. There was also criticism of what was not included: the bill did not include provisions for drilling in the Arctic National Wildlife Refuge (ANWR) even though some Republicans claim "access to the abundant oil reserves in ANWR would strengthen America's energy independence without harming the environment." There are a number of tax credits in the Act, including the Nonbusiness Energy Property Tax Credit.

=== Developments 2007 to present ===
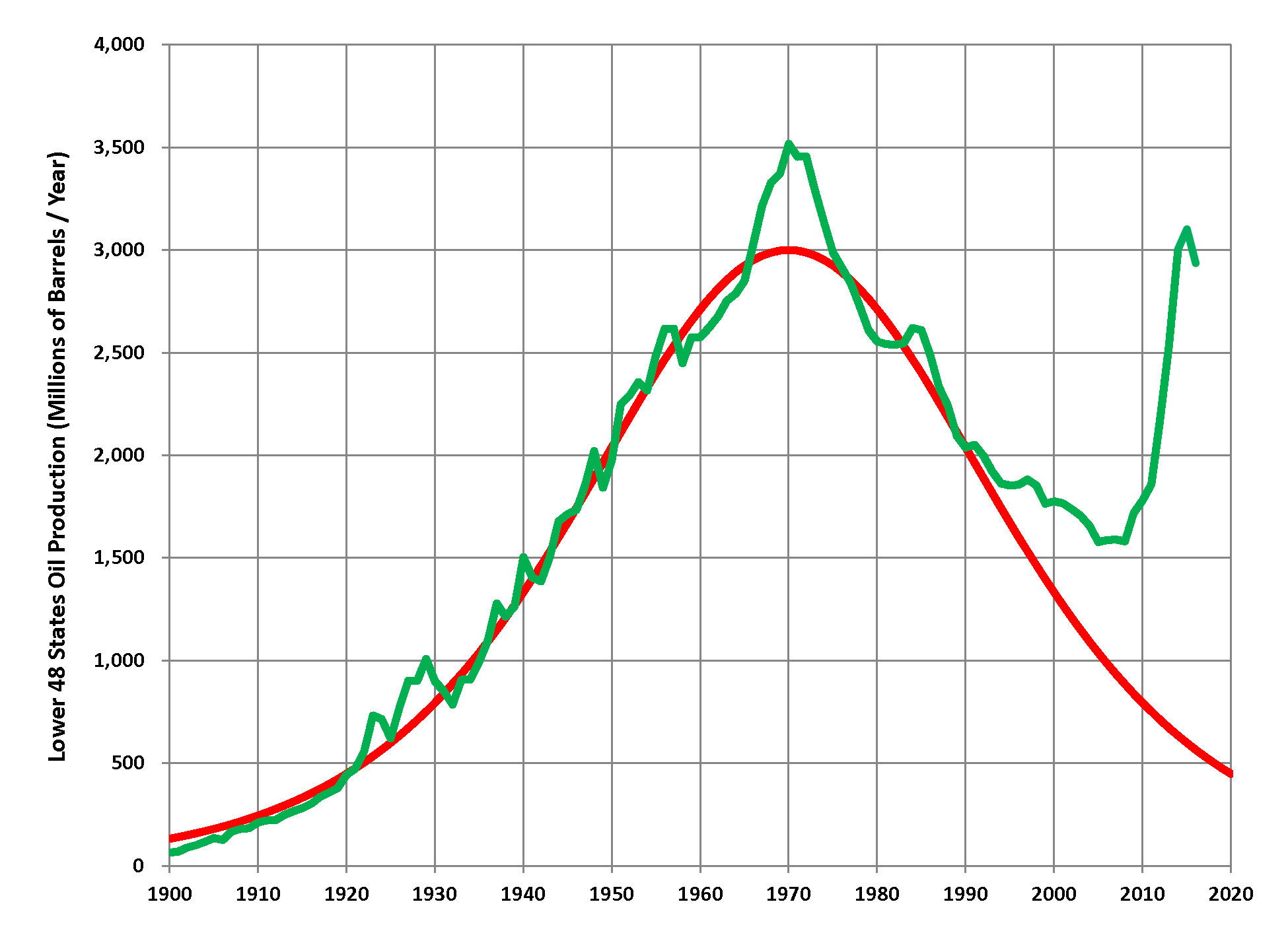
Hubbert's upper-bound prediction for US crude oil production (1956), and actual lower-48 states production through 2014

Two federal laws passed in 2007 were the Energy Independence and Security Act of 2007, and the Food and Energy Security Act of 2007.

The auto industry said federal regulators are pushing too far, too fast in their effort to raise fuel-mileage rules. The complaints from the industry, which had previously voiced support for tougher standards, underscore how economic hardship is affecting a major policy debate.

— The Wall Street Journal

The Biomass Research and Development Board was expected to release a report in late 2008 about biomass as fuel.

In August 2008, it was revealed that oil speculators had increased the volatility of the price of oil; Congressman John Dingell criticized the Commodity Futures Trading Commission for failing to scrutinize oil futures traders, in particular the Swiss company Vitol. On June 22, 2008, Obama proposed the repeal of the Enron loophole as a means to curb speculation on skyrocketing oil prices.

In October 2008, as the Democratic Party approached victory in the 2008 elections, they remained divided on energy policy, thus a consensus was not expected in energy law. President Barack Obama's first Secretary of Energy, Steven Chu, had no prior expertise in law.

The Department of Energy (DOE) will, by administrative measures, reduce the Hanford nuclear reservation (originally 586 square miles) to 10 square miles. Much of the remaining area will go to the 300-square-mile (780 km^{2}) Hanford Reach National Monument.

In October 2009, Secretary Chu announced a new program, Arpa-e, which will fund grants authorized under the Energy Independence and Security Act of 2007.

The "Energy Credit for Qualified Fuel Cell Property and Qualified Microturbine Property" was created in 2008, but it appears to have expired as of 2013.

Individual taxpayers may claim several energy credits to reduce their federal income taxes, if they file the Long Form 1040 along with Form 5695 attached. These include the "Resident energy efficient property tax credit", and starting in the 2012 tax year, a "nonbusiness energy property credit". Some of these provisions were extended by ARRA (see below) and by later bills.

=== American Recovery and Reinvestment Act of 2009 ===
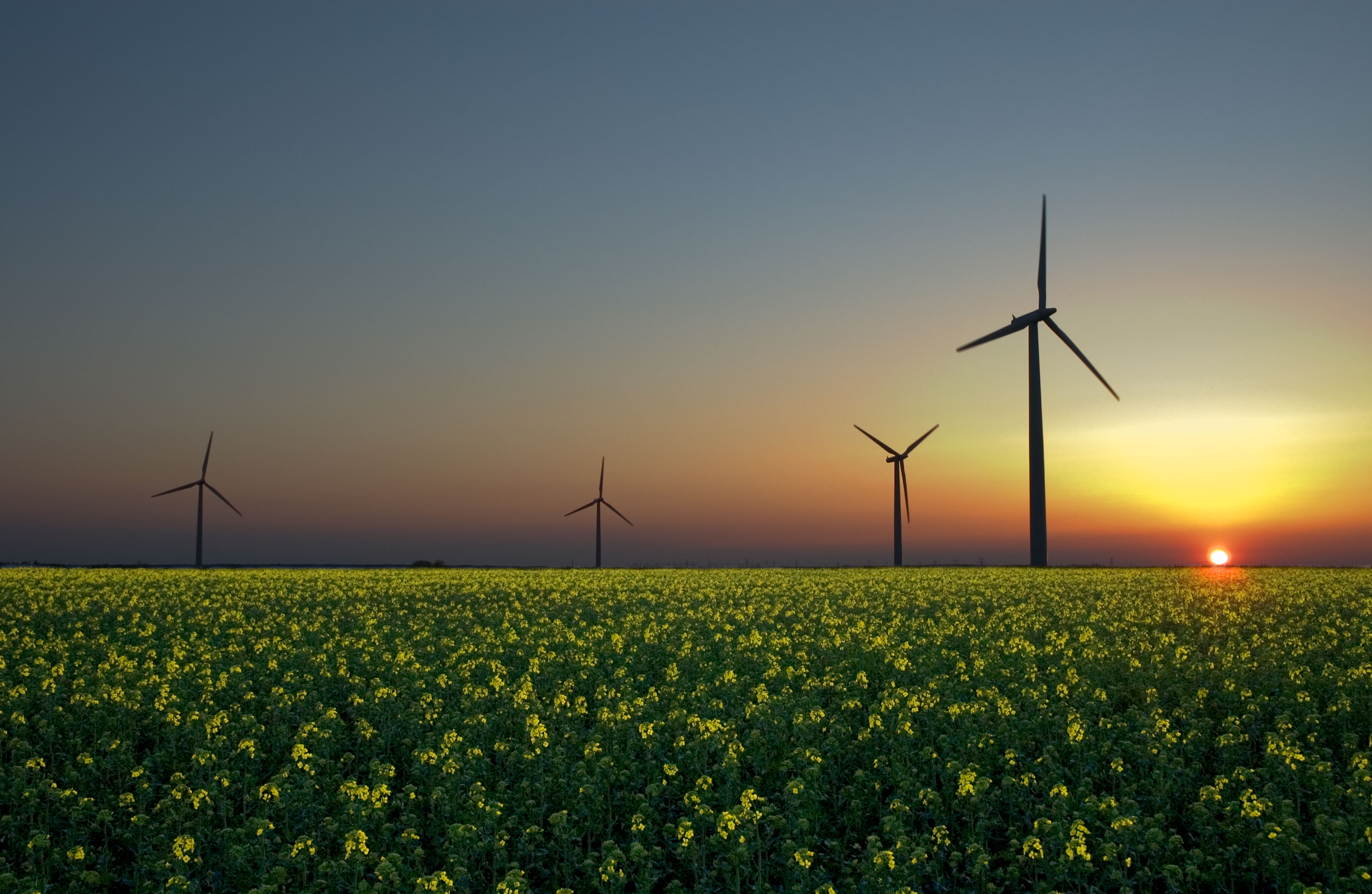
Loans and investments into green energy technology is a significant part of ARRA

As part of the $787 billion stimulus package or "ARRA" (technically the American Recovery and Reinvestment Act of 2009),

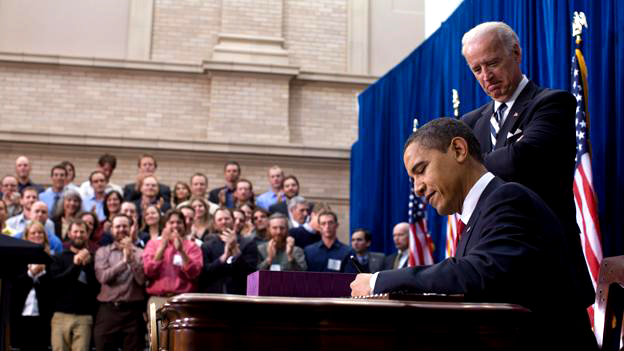
U.S. President Barack Obama signs the ARRA into law on February 17, 2009, in Denver, Colorado. Vice President Joe Biden stands behind him.

US law now allows rebates for energy efficient products and for weatherization. Energy law and policy are significantly affected by this new law.

Official seal of the American Recovery and Reinvestment Act of 2009.

=== Energy Act of 2020 ===
In 2020, Congress passed and President Donald Trump signed into law the Consolidated Appropriations Act, 2021, incorporating the Energy Act of 2020, which empowered the federal government to create the United States critical materials list and expanded the government's energy research and development programs.

=== Biden administration energy laws ===
In 2021, Congress passed and President Joe Biden signed into law the Infrastructure Investment and Jobs Act, spending $73 billion to overhaul the United States' energy policy. Some of the provisions include creating a new grant program for industrial tech demonstration projects, projects related to critical minerals, energy efficiency, electric vehicle charging networks and the hydrogen economy, and clarifying regulations allowing FERC to site transmission lines in National Interest Electric Transmission Corridors in case states themselves fail to issue related permits.

In June 2022, the Biden administration invoked the Defense Production Act of 1950 to produce more solar and fuel cells and heat pumps. Two months later, Biden signed into law the CHIPS and Science Act, further expanding the Department of Energy's research and development programs and creating a supportive nonprofit.

A week later, Biden signed the Inflation Reduction Act. The IRA tied auctions for federal land leases to oil and gas interests. However, it also expanded select tax credits for renewable and nuclear energy, and expanded or created grant programs for energy efficiency, electric transmission permitting reform, and industrial decarbonization projects, as well as sustainable agriculture.

In 2024, Biden signed the ADVANCE Act into law, enabling comprehensive regulatory reform of the nuclear industry.

=== Second Trump administration actions ===
In July 2025, President Trump signed into law the One Big Beautiful Bill Act, which partially repeals the IRA.

== State laws ==
The states affect energy in numerous ways, including taxes, land use controls, regulation of energy utilities, and energy subsidies. States may establish environmental standards stricter than those set by the federal government. Regulation of oil and gas production, particularly on non-federal land, is largely left up to the states.

=== Alaska law ===
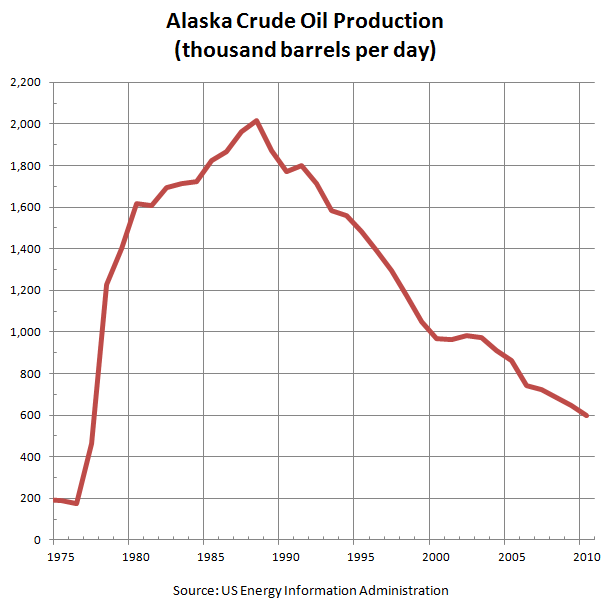
Alaska oil production peaked in 1988 and has declined 65% since

Alaska has vast energy resources:

- Major oil and gas reserves are found in the Prudhoe Bay area of the Alaska North Slope (ANS) and Cook Inlet basins. According to the Energy Information Administration, Alaska ranks second in the nation in crude oil production, accounting for 1/5 (20%) of United States oil production, Prudhoe Bay alone accounting for 8% of the United States domestic oil production.
- The Trans-Alaska Pipeline pumps up to 2.1 million barrels (330,000 m^{3}) of crude oil per day, more than any other crude oil pipeline in the United States.
- Substantial coal deposits are found in Alaska's bituminous, sub-bituminous, and lignite coal basins. The United States Geological Survey estimates that there are 85.4 trillion cubic feet (2,420 km^{3}) of undiscovered, technically recoverable gas from natural gas hydrates on the Alaskan North Slope.
- Alaska also offers some of the highest hydroelectric power potential in the country from its numerous rivers, and large swaths of the Alaskan coastline offer wind and geothermal energy potential as well. As of 2001, the state's Energy Plan stated that, although wind and hydroelectric power are abundant, with low-cost electric interties they were judged uneconomical.

Likewise, Alaska receives a large proportion of its state revenues from its severance tax on oil: a full 68% of all revenue, much more than any state (only Wyoming coming close). Its dependence on petroleum revenues and federal subsidies allows it to have the lowest individual tax burden in the United States.

The state created the Alaska Permanent Fund from this "golden egg", which is owned and managed by the state, and "created by a constitutional amendment":

In November 1976, Alaskans voted to amend their state constitution to create the Permanent Fund. The state constitution and supporting statutes set out the Fund's purpose and how it works.

— Alaska Permanent Fund

The constitutional provisions are found at Alaska Constitution Article IX, Section 15. Statutes regulate how the Fund is to be invested, as well as how the income is to be disbursed. Regulations state additional details regarding control of the Fund.

The federal government runs the Alaska Natural Gas Transportation Projects, which are new pipelines, and its "Federal Coordinator" (director) is nominated with advice and consent of the Senate by the President of the United States. Drue Pearce was the first director; she was nominated by George W. Bush and served from December 13, 2006, through January 3, 2010. Larry Persilly is the current coordinator; he was nominated by Barack Obama on December 9, 2009, and was confirmed by the United States Senate on March 10, 2010.

=== California law ===
The most populous state in the United States, California has gone through a series of energy crises, and has reacted with several laws concerning energy. The California Energy Code, or Title 24 of the California Code of Regulations, also titled "The Energy Efficiency Standards for Residential and Nonresidential Buildings", were established in 1978 in response to a legislative mandate to reduce California's energy consumption. The standards are updated periodically to allow consideration and possible incorporation of new energy efficiency technologies and methods, such as the programmable communicating thermostat.

California assesses an excise tax with the same basic rate of 18 cents per gallon on gasoline, diesel fuel, and gasohol. The state collects a relatively small 6.6 percent of its revenue from extraction and related taxes.

On November 5, 2024, California voters approved a ballot proposal about the environment and energy law, 2024 California Proposition 4. It passed by a wide margin, 59.8% to 40.2%.

=== Florida law ===
Florida is unique in having multiple local government electricity utilities; they are organized into the Florida Municipal Electric Association.

=== Georgia ===
The state of Georgia has increased energy rates six times in two years between 2023 and 2025, leading to higher power bills. On June 17, 2025, voters had a unique chance to cast ballots that would indirectly change the law, by re-electing current members or choosing their party's new candidates for the Georgia Public Service Commission. In the Primary Elections held that day for the 2025 Georgia Public Service Commission special election, the Republicans chose the incumbents, Tim Echols in District 2, and Fitz Johnson in District 3; Democratic Party voters chose Alicia Johnson in District 2 and in District 3, Keisha Waites will face Peter Hubbard in a runoff election. The election is widely viewed as a referendum on the Republicans' "Georgia Power rate hikes." Georgia, considered a purple state, could have a competitive, high-turnout contest in the court-delayed election on November 4, 2025, an unprecedented circumstance of direct democracy for energy law.

=== Illinois ===
Illinois has a deregulated energy market, which does not allow its utilities to own generation. Illinois has a strong solar market and is only one of two Midwestern states to allow community solar. In 2025, the state's first community-owned community solar project came online in Galesburg, Illinois.

=== Minnesota ===
The law of Minnesota includes energy law as a topic, which can be searched through the state's online legal database LawMoose.

=== New Mexico law ===
As a major energy producer, New Mexico has government offices related to energy, including the Energy Conservation and Management Division, which is part of the state's Energy, Minerals and Natural Resources Department. All of the major laws impacting energy are available from the Division's website. These include links to all of the state's statutes and related government websites, federal and state regulations, and executive orders.

Uranium mining in New Mexico had been significant from about 1950 until 1998. Several oil and gas companies developed uranium ore mines in New Mexico during that period. As of 2007, at least one company was evaluating development by in-situ leaching; there are potentially large deposits of coffinite and uranium oxide ores available in New Mexico.

New Mexico has enacted a number of new laws related to energy, including to create a New Mexico Renewable Energy Transmission Authority and to increase its renewable portfolio standards. According to one law firm's summary of President Obama's Economic Recovery Package, the state stands to gain much from the new administration, because "New Mexico leaders and laboratories are at the forefront of energy policy." For example, former University of New Mexico Law School professor Suedeen G. Kelly was a member of the Federal Energy Regulatory Commission.

The state collects an effective rate of 18.875 cent per gallon tax on gasoline and gasohol, and 22.875 cents per gallon on diesel. Like many western states, it collects significant revenue from extraction taxes—20.9 percent of its overall sources.

The city of Albuquerque passed an ordinance to regulate "efficiency standards for heating and cooling equipment," which was struck down by the U.S. District Court as violating the Commerce Clause of the U.S. Constitution.

The town board of Taos passed a "strict new new building code" in 2009 that mandated energy savings:

The ordinance ... mandates that residential construction meet Home Energy Rating System standards that gradually phase in starting this year, and commercial construction must meet Leadership In Energy and Environmental Design certified standards beginning this year.

— AP report, March 4, 2009.

The town debated the proposed Ordinance 08-16, High Performance Building Ordinance, starting in October 2008, postponed it for legal review, debated it in February 2009, and passed it in March 2009.

The New Mexico Gas Company offers an Energy Star Home Rebate.

In October 2009, Governor Bill Richardson announced 21 grants for energy projects that were being funded by $8 million in ARRA funds.

=== New York law ===
New York has an Energy Law. Under New York law, "energy" and "energy resources" are defined as:

Energy" means work or heat that is, or may be, produced from any fuel or source whatsoever. ... "Energy resources" shall mean any force or material which yields or has the potential to yield energy, including but not limited to electrical, fossil, geothermal, wind, hydro, solid waste, tidal, wood, solar and nuclear sources.

— N.Y. Energy Law § 1-103 (5) and (6).

The chief regulator is the "Commissioner" or "president" of the New York State Energy Research and Development Authority (also called NYSERDA). The board of directors of NYSERDA includes—as a matter of law—several utility insiders, as well as ex officio commissioners. Vincent DeIorio, a lawyer, is chairman of the board, and Francis J. Murray Jr. is president and CEO. NYSERDA was created as a public benefit corporation under NY law. New York's other regulatory bodies and entities include the New York State Public Service Commission, the New York State Department of Health, the New York Power Authority, and the Long Island Power Authority.

In addition to Energy Law, the state has a variety of laws regulating and taxing energy, and its courts have issued significant case law concerning energy taxes. Two trial court cases in 2012 allowed local zoning law to pre-empt state law by effectively banning hydrofracking, but this is being appealed.

Under New York law, both the New York Attorney General or a district attorney may prosecute alleged polluters who make oil spills. The state has enacted a number of recent laws to control carbon emissions.

The state collects an effective rate of 24.4 cent per gallon tax on gasoline and gasohol, and 22.65 cents per gallon on diesel. New York collects one of the smallest amounts of revenue from extraction taxes of any state—only 5.8 percent of its overall sources.

=== Oregon ===
Oregon has established an Energy Efficiency Center, one of 31 Industrial Assessment Centers. In 2025, Oregon passed a bill to allow municipalities, businesses and communities to build, own and operate microgrids.

=== Texas law ===
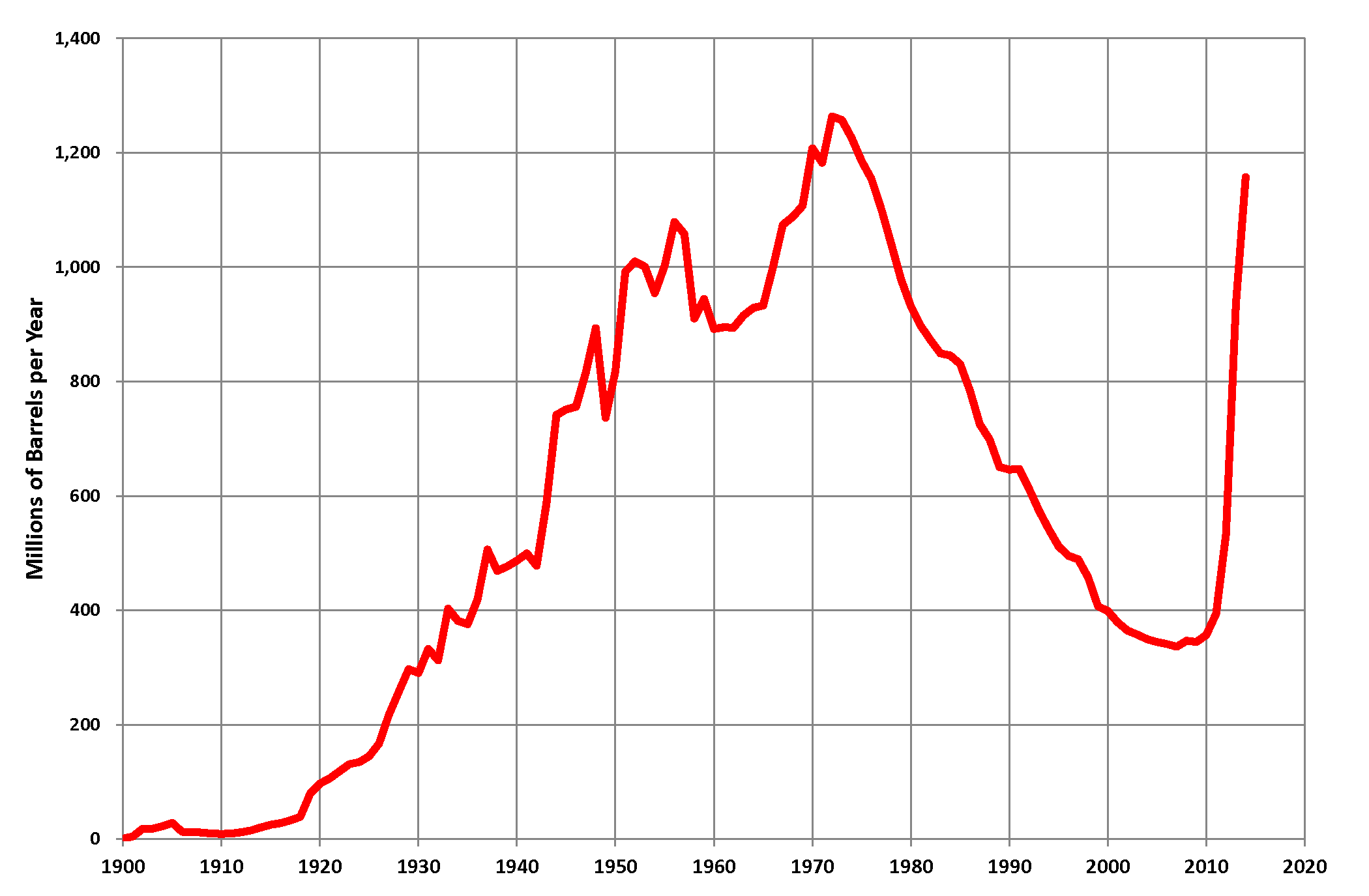
Texas oil production curve

Oil, gas, and other energy resources are regulated by the powerful Texas Railroad Commission. It is the oldest regulatory agency in Texas, having been created in 1891. It "oversee[s] the Texas oil and gas industry, gas utilities, pipeline safety, safety in the liquefied petroleum gas industry, and the surface mining of coal."

According to Forbes, the University of Houston has an "exceptional" energy policy and law program.

=== Vermont law ===
The state of Vermont, like other states, has a comprehensive statutory scheme governing energy generation and transmission issues, colloquially referred to as "Section 248." The reference is to 30 V.S.A. Sec. 248, which is administered by Vermont's Public Service Board, a quasi-judicial board with three members. Section 248 is not to be confused with Vermont's comprehensive law governing land development and subdivision – Act 250. The state has an independent energy distributor, the Vermont Electric Cooperative.

=== Wyoming law ===
Wyoming is the top coal producer of the 50 states in the United States, has significant oil and gas reserves, and its government and laws reflect an interest in energy production, especially fossil fuels. The Wyoming Oil and Gas Conservation Commission regulates many aspects of oil, coal, and gas development in this resource-rich state. There is an annual state Gas Fair. The University of Wyoming is well known for its research on energy development. The university sponsored a symposium on coal gasification in 2007.

Wyoming assesses an excise tax with the same rate of 14 cents per gallon on gasoline, diesel fuel, and gasohol. The state collects the largest percentage—46 percent of its revenue—from extraction and related taxes, the second highest of the states, surpassed only by Alaska.

Governing has noted that starting in 2000, many observers have viewed the state's "overreliance on minerals taxes" to be "fiscally unhealthy", but it was rescued by the oil, gas, and coal boom; there remains a political wariness about imposing an income tax, yet in 2012 the state imposed a tax on wind turbines.

=== Other state laws ===
Florida and South Carolina have instituted utility fees to finance planned nuclear reactors.

Indiana passed in 2009 a law "that allows the state's finance authority to negotiate long-term contracts to buy and sell synthetic natural gas from a planned southern Indiana coal-gasification plant."

Massachusetts Governor Deval Patrick successfully pushed for "clean energy initiatives" in the 2008 legislative session, calling it "one of the most productive in a long, long time."

New Hampshire passed in 2008 an energy law, signed by Governor John Lynch, which "provides guidelines for residential wind energy systems ... such as height, noise, setbacks and aesthetics and outlines a process for input from neighbors." This was found necessary because a University of New Hampshire student, Laura Carpenter, found that "most communities had no ordinances or zoning rules that specifically address small residential wind turbines."

Ohio requires utilities to meet regulatory goals for conservation.

== See also ==
- Energy usage of the United States military
- Ethanol research
- Federal Energy Regulatory Commission (FERC)
- Philippine energy law (formerly a commonwealth of the United States)
- Royalty payment
- Strategic Petroleum Reserve (United States)
