= Amanda Simpson =

American engineer and business executive (born 1961)

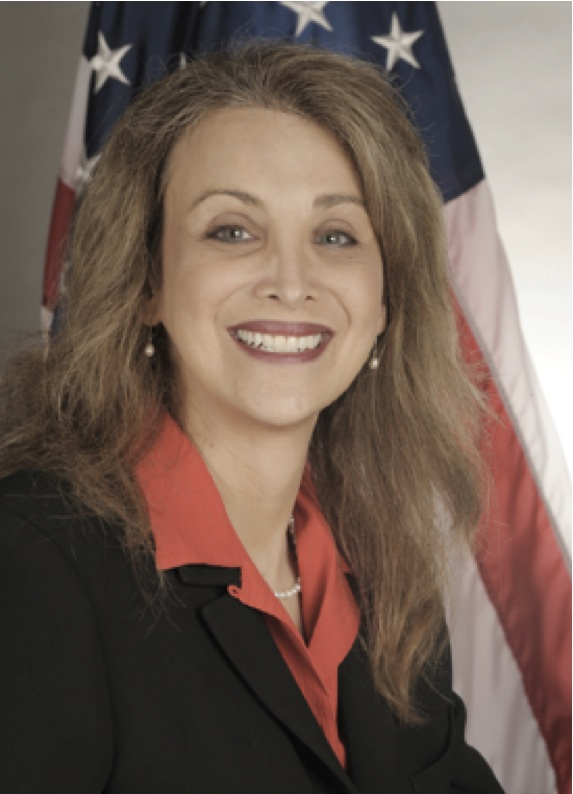
- Simpson in 2010
- Born: March 26, 1961 (age 65); Chicago, Illinois, U.S.
- Education: Harvey Mudd College (BS); California State University, Northridge (MS); University of Arizona (MBA)
- Occupations: Vice president, Research and Technology, Airbus Americas; former deputy assistant secretary of defense for Operational Energy, U.S. Dept. of Defense
- Known for: First openly transgender woman U.S. presidential appointee
- Political party: Democratic

Amanda Renae Simpson (born March 26, 1961) is an American pilot, businessperson and politician. Simpson is an advisor and consultant on aerospace, energy, and culture and belonging as Founder and CEO of Third Segment LLC.

Simpson retired as vice president for Research and Technology at Airbus Americas and was the head of Sustainability for Airbus in the Americas. Simpson was the former Deputy Assistant Secretary of Defense for Operational Energy (Note: Operational Energy is the energy required for training, moving, and sustaining military forces and weapons platforms for military operations. The term includes energy used by power systems, generators, logistics assets, and weapons platforms employed by military forces during training and in the field.) and was previously the executive director of the U.S. Army Office of Energy Initiatives, (Note: Previously named the Army Energy Initiatives Task Force.) leading the Army's efforts to implement large-scale renewable energy projects. Her first posting in the Army was as the special assistant to the Army Acquisition Executive. In that role, she was a principal advisor to the United States assistant secretary of the Army for Acquisition, Logistics, and Technology on all matters relating to Army acquisition, procurement, research & development and logistics. Upon Simpson's appointment to the position of senior technical advisor in the Bureau of Industry and Security in 2010, she became the first openly transgender woman political appointee of any presidential administration. Simpson worked in the United States Department of Defense and was the first transgender person to lead an U.S. Department of Defense organization.

== Early life and education ==
Simpson was born in Chicago as the oldest of four siblings.

She received a Bachelor of Science in physics from Harvey Mudd College in 1983; a Master of Science in engineering from California State University, Northridge, in 1988 on a Hughes Aircraft Fellowship; and an MBA from the University of Arizona in 2001 on a Raytheon Fellowship.

== Flying ==
Simpson participated in the Bates Aeronautics Program while a student at Harvey Mudd College. She earned her single engine land private pilot's license in 1981, a commercial pilot's license with instrument privileges in 1983, and became a certified flight instructor – airplane in 1988 and an instrument instructor in 1989. In 1988 she added a multi-engine class rating to her commercial license to qualify for transfer to Hughes Missile Systems as a project test engineer and pilot. Simpson upgraded to an airline transport pilot (ATP) license in 1994 after adding multi-engine to her flight instructor ratings in 1991. In 1997 she added single-engine sea (float planes and flying boats) to her ATP license. In 2005 she became one of only a few licensed pilots flying FAA-certified unmanned aircraft in the national airspace system.

In 1989 she co-founded Processional Pilot Training, a fixed-base operation at the Burbank, Glendale, Pasadena Airport (KBUR) focused on flight instruction (private through airline transport) taught by professional flight instructors. She relinquished her ownership share of that business when she relocated to Tucson, Arizona, in 1994.

Simpson was a mission director and project pilot for captive flight test activities beginning in 1988 before taking over as director of flight operations in 1993 for the Integration, Test and Analysis Laboratory at Hughes Missile Systems. As a systems test pilot she flew the T-39 Sabreliner, Douglas A-3 Skywarrior, and Convair CV-580 test platforms in support of missile seeker technology development for Hughes Aircraft and Raytheon Missile Systems. In addition, she flew numerous large transport category aircraft, light multi-engine and single engine aircraft modified for missile flight test purposes.

As of 2009, she had flown over 60 makes and models of aircraft, and had accumulated 3000 flight hours.

== Aerospace career ==
While an undergraduate, Simpson spent her summers working as a student engineer in the customer service organization on the DC-8/DC-9/DC-10 electrical systems at the Douglas Aircraft facility in Long Beach, and on the AH-64 Apache Target Acquisition and Designation Sight/Pilot Night Vision Systems at Hughes Helicopter Company in Marina Del Rey.

She was hired by Hughes Electron Dynamics Division in Torrance, California, in 1983 as an engineer and program manager. She was responsible for engineering and manufacturing of the Gridded Traveling Wave Tube and Continuous Wave Illuminator for the AWG-9/APG-71 radar systems. In 1988 she transferred to the Hughes Missile Systems Company in Canoga Park, where she became the lead and director of flight operations for the captive flight test activities. She moved those operations to Tucson, where she consolidated the Hughes activities with the missile test operations of General Dynamics, and later Raytheon, as part of corporate mergers. Simpson designed and oversaw construction of an 80,000 sq. ft. dedicated flight test facility at the Tucson International Airport.

She moved into project management in 1999, overseeing the daily operations of small Raytheon, Texas Instruments Defense Systems & Electronics Group, and Standard Missile Company projects that had been relocated to Tucson as part of the corporate merger.

Simpson occupied several systems engineer, systems architect, and systems integrator roles in between 2002 and 2006 on projects diverse as the Unmanned Combat Armed Rotorcraft, the Joint Airborne Weapons System (JAWS; later renamed the Beechcraft AT-6B) and a variety of advanced technology development and demonstration projects at Raytheon. Simpson also contributed to the development and/or testing of numerous operation missile systems including Maverick, AMRAAM, Standard, Phalanx, TOW, RAM, JAGM, ACM, HARM, JSOW, MALD, ESSM, SilentEyes, Sidewinder, Sparrow, Paveway and Tomahawk.

She departed from Raytheon in 2010, at which point she was a deputy director and senior program manager, leading teams developing advanced technology in the Advanced Missiles and Unmanned Systems product line.

Completing her public service with the Defense Department, she joined Airbus Americas in 2018 as the vice president for research and technology. In this role, she is responsible for coordinating technology development, research activities, and innovation for Airbus in the Western Hemisphere. She also heads Airbus' sustainability and clean fuels initiatives in the United States.

She has served on the board of directors of the Commonwealth Center for Advanced Manufacturing, Advanced Thermal Batteries, Inc., and is the chairperson of the Airbus Institute for Engineering Research at the University of Southern California.

In late 2022, Simpson was appointed by Transportation Secretary Pete Buttigieg to serve on the Commercial Space Transportation Advisory Committee (COMSTAC), along with 20 other new members, to provide information, advice and recommendations to the FAA and DOT about technology, business and policy issues regarding oversight of the U.S. commercial space transportation sector.

Simpson is a contributing writer in AIAA Aerospace America magazine. "Simpson's View" is a monthly opinion column on issues relating to the future of the aerospace and aviation industries.

== Political career ==
Simpson served as a commissioner on the City of Tucson Gay, Lesbian, Bisexual and Transgender Commission from 2001 until 2008, representing Councilwoman Carol West.

Simpson was a candidate for representative of District 26 in the Arizona House of Representatives in 2004. She won the Democratic primary with over 57% of the vote, but was unsuccessful in the general election where she finished third, receiving 20% in the best two of four contest.

In the 2004 election, she was elected precinct committeeperson, and was chosen as a state committeeperson by the Democratic Party of Legislative District 26 in 2006. She was also elected to the Executive Board and held the office of district treasurer in 2008. She continued to hold those posts until her resignation upon accepting a post in President Obama's administration in 2009. In 2005, Simpson was one of the founders of the Democrats of Oro Valley Club. She was also the first vice chair of the Arizona Democratic Party LGBT caucus.

At the Arizona Democratic State Convention in 2008, Simpson was elected as an Arizona delegate for Hillary Clinton to the 2008 Democratic National Convention.

In late 2009, Simpson accepted an appointment by the Obama administration, where she served in the Department of Commerce as the senior technical adviser to the Bureau of Industry and Security.

In July 2011, she was reposted to the Pentagon as the special assistance to the assistant secretary of the Army for Acquisition, Logistics and Technology (ASA/ALT). In July 2013, she was detailed to the Army Energy Initiatives Task Force, where she served as the deputy executive director until January 2014, when she was named the executive director by the assistant secretary of the Army for Installations, Energy & Environment (ASA-IEE). In October 2014, the Army Energy Initiatives Task Force became the U.S. Army Office of Energy Initiatives.

In September 2015, Simpson was sworn in as the first deputy assistant secretary of Defense for Operational Energy. This position was the result of the merging of the Office of the Assistant Secretary of Defense for Operational Energy, Plans and Programs with the Office of the Deputy Under Secretary of Defense for Installations and Environment to create the Office of the Assistant Secretary of Defense for Energy, Installations and Environment in late 2014. Simpson served until the end of the Obama administration, as she was asked to resign, along with nearly all appointees. She departed the Pentagon on January 19, 2017.

In 2022 it was reported that the White House had narrowed their choice for the next Administrator of the Federal Aviation Administration to between Phil Washington and Simpson. Washington was subsequently nominated for the position.

== Non-profit board service ==
Simpson has served on the boards of the Wingspan Community Center, the Southern Arizona Gender Alliance, the Arizona Human Rights Fund, the National Center for Transgender Equality, Out and Equal Workplace Advocates, and the Southern Arizona Chapter of the American Civil Liberties Union.

While an employee at Raytheon, she served on the boards of the Raytheon Women's Network; Raytheon Global Women's Network; the Gay, Lesbian, Bisexual, Transgender and Allies Alliance; and the Raytheon Diversity Council. At Airbus she serves as the executive sponsor for the Pride at Airbus, Women's Interactive Network, and Families@Airbus Employee Resource Groups.

Simpson serves on the University of Michigan Aerospace Engineering Department Industrial Advisory Board and the Georgia Tech External Advisory Boards for the Aerospace Systems Design Laboratory and Strategic Energy Institute. She is also a member of the Spruce Goose Advisory Board for the Evergreen Aviation and Space Museum.

Simpson is a fellow of the American Institute of Aeronautics and Astronautics, and served on its Systems Engineering Technical Committee from 2007 to 2009. She is also a fellow of the Royal Aeronautical Society and serves on the board of directors of the Washington, D.C., branch.

== Recognition ==
- 2024 AIAA Mary W. Jackson Diversity and Inclusion Award
- 2023 Out & Equal LGBTQ+ Corporate Advocate Outie
- 2022 LGBTQ Victory Institute Hall of Fame
- 2018 Harvey Mudd College Outstanding Alumni Award
- 2017 DoD Pride Civilian Leadership Award
- 2017 Secretary of Defense Medal for Outstanding Public Service
- 2016 Arlington Gay Lesbian Alliance (AGLA) Champion Award
- 2015 National Conference for College Women Student Leaders Women of Distinction Award
- 2015 MTV - "9 Transgender Trailblazers Who Paved The Way"
- 2014 Time - "21 Transgender People Who Influenced American Culture"
- 2013 Julie Johnson Founder's Award by the National Center for Transgender Equality
- 2013 Community Advocacy Award by The Capital Area Gay and Lesbian Chamber of Commerce
- 2011 LGBT Icon by Equality Forum
- 2011 Echo Hall of Fame by Echo Magazine
- 2011 Named one of the "Hidden 105" by Out
- 2010 OUTstanding Individual Award (OUT for Work)
- 2010 Louise Young Award (Raytheon)
- 2006 Raytheon Missile Systems Team Excellence Award
- 2005 Grand Marshal, Tucson Pride Parade
- 2005 Arizona Human Rights Fund Individual Award
- 2004 Tucson YWCA Woman on the Move
- 2001 Raytheon Woman on the Move
- 1999 DARPA Award for Significant Technical Achievement

== See also ==
- List of transgender public officeholders in the United States
