= UCAR =

Ucar or UCAR may refer to:

- University Corporation for Atmospheric Research, a U.S. organization of atmospheric research institutions
- Unmanned Combat Armed Rotorcraft, a United States pilotless attack helicopter program, cancelled in 2005.
- Union Commerciale d'Assurances et de Réassurance, an insurance company in Burundi
- Ujar Rayon, a province in Azerbaijan
- Ucar, Azerbaijan, capital of that region
- Úcar, a municipality in the province of Navarre, Spain
- Uçar, Turkish surname
- U-Car, a type of race car built from stock parts
- Godfrey Chitalu, Legendary Zambian footballer and coach
- Gabriel Ucar Swedish football player
- A European brand name for consumer batteries formerly developed by Union Carbide.
