= Mindoro Wind Farm =

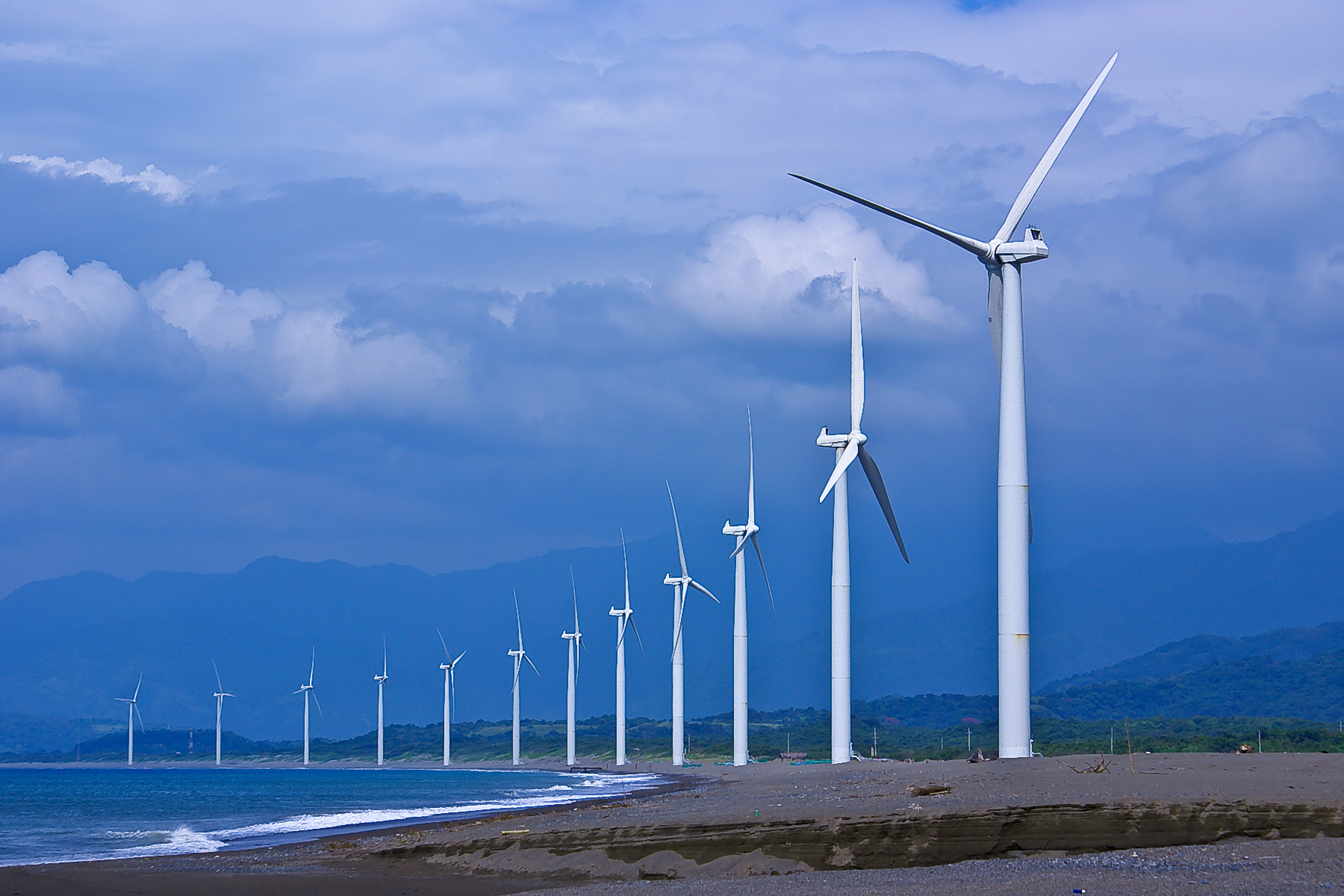
- Official name: Wind Energy Power System
- Country: Philippines
- Location: Mindoro Oriental
- Coordinates: 13°30′N 120°57′E
- Owners: Philippine Hybrid Energy Systems, Inc.

Wind farm
- Type: Onshore
- Hub height: 70 m (230 ft)

Power generation
- Units operational: 8 X 2 MW
- Make and model: Siemens Gamesa
- Nameplate capacity: 16 MW

The Wind Energy Power System (WEPS) is a wind farm project located near Puerto Galera, in the Philippine province of Mindoro Oriental. Once completed the project will generate an estimated 48MW of electricity.

== Project details ==
The WEPS is located in the municipality of Puerto Galera, on the island of Mindoro. The project is being developed by Philippine Hybrid Energy Systems, Inc. a joint Philippine, Italian, and American developer. The first stage of development was approved in June 2011 by Philippine Energy Secretary Jose Almendras. This comes as part of the Philippine Government's ambitious energy policy.

On March 7, 2012, in Mindoro, Philippine President Aquino signed the Proposed Luzon Mindoro-Interconnection (LMI) project with the full support of Cong. Rudy Valencia, Cong. Rey Umali, Governor Alfonso Umali, and the Local Government of Mindoro. This agreement will allow for excess electricity to be transported to the nearby island of Luzon, home to the nation's capital and largest city Manila. "Before I end my term in 2016, I want to see Mindoro exporting its surplus power to Luzon," commented President Benigno Aquino III during a recent signing ceremony.

The project is being developed jointly by Philippine Hybrid Energy Systems, Inc. Italian power utility developer CMC Asia, Inc. and turbine manufacturer and building contractor Gamesa Eolica, S.L. Unipersonal of Spain.

This project has been shelved and has not even progressed beyond a handshake.
