= Energy service company =

Company on energy conservation and supply

An energy service company (ESCO) is a company that provides a broad range of energy solutions including designs and implementation of energy savings projects, retrofitting, energy conservation, energy infrastructure outsourcing, power generation, energy supply, and risk management.

A newer breed of ESCO includes innovative financing methods, such as off-balance sheet mechanisms, a range of applicable equipment configured in such a way that reduces the energy cost of a building. The ESCO starts by performing an analysis of the property, designs an energy efficient solution, installs the required elements, and maintains the system to ensure energy savings during the payback period. The savings in energy costs are often used to pay back the capital investment of the project over a five to twenty years period or reinvested into the building to allow the capital upgrades that may otherwise be unfeasible. If the project does not provide returns on the investment, the ESCO is often responsible to pay the difference.

== History ==
=== The beginning ===
The start of the energy services business can be attributed to the energy crisis of the late 1970s, as entrepreneurs developed ways to combat the rise in energy costs. One of the earliest examples was a company in Texas, Time Energy, which introduced a device to automate the switching of lights and other equipment to regulate energy use. The primary reason that the product did not initially sell was because potential users doubted that the savings would actually rise. To combat this doubt, the company decided to install the device upfront and ask for a percentage of the savings that was accumulated. The result was the basis for the ESCO model. Through this process, the company achieved higher sales and more return since the savings were large.

=== Industry growth through the 1970s and 1980s ===
As more entrepreneurs saw this market grow, more companies came into creation. The first wave of ESCOs were often small divisions of large energy companies or small, upstart, independent companies. However, after the energy crisis came to an end, the companies had little leverage on potential clients to perform energy-saving projects, given the lower cost of energy. This prevented the growth experienced in the late 1970s from continuing. The industry grew slowly through the 1970s and 1980s, spurred by specialist firms such as Hospital Efficiency Corporation (HEC Inc.), established in 1982 to focus on the energy intensive medical sector. HEC Inc., later renamed Select Energy Services, was acquired in 1990 by Northeast Utilities, and sold in 2006 to Ameresco.

=== The 1990s: Utilities and consolidated energy companies become the major players ===
With deregulation in the U.S. energy markets in the 1990s, the energy services business experienced a rapid rise. Utilities, which for decades enjoyed the shelter of monopolies with guaranteed returns on power plant investments, now had to compete to supply power to many of their largest customers. They now looked to energy services as a potential new business line to retain their existing large customers. Also, with the new opportunities on the supply side, many energy services companies (ESCOs) started to expand into the generation market, building district power plants or including cogeneration facilities within efficiency projects. For example, in November 1996 BGA, Inc., formerly a privately held, regional energy performance contracting and consulting company was acquired by TECO Energy, and in 2004 was acquired by Chevron Corporation. In 1998, BGA entered the District Energy Plant business, completing construction on the first 3rd-party owned and operated district cooling plant in Florida.

=== Decade of the 2000s: Consolidation, exit of many utilities ===
In the wake of the Enron collapse in 2001, and the sputtering or reverse of deregulation efforts, many utilities shut down or sold their energy services businesses. There was a significant consolidation among the remaining independent firms. According to the industry group NAESCO, revenues of ESCOs in the U.S. grew by 22% in 2006, reaching $3.6 billion.

== See also ==
- Efficient energy use
- Energy law
- Industrial Assessment Center
- RESCO – renewable energy service company
