= FMEA (disambiguation) =

FMEA is an initialism for failure mode and effects analysis.

FMEA may also refer to:

- Florida Municipal Electric Association
- Florida Music Education Association
