= Seal of the United States Department of Defense =

Seal of the United States Department of Defense

The Seal of the United States Department of Defense is a symbol that is used by the United States Department of Defense. Its first use was August 22, 1949.

== Meaning ==
The symbolism of the original seal is in Appendix VI Joint Army and Air Force Bulletin No. 23:

"An American eagle is displayed facing to the right. Wings are horizontal. The eagle grasps three crossed arrows and bears on its breast a shield whose lower two-thirds carries alternating white and red stripes and whose upper third is blue. Above the eagle is an arc of thirteen stars with alternating rays. Below the eagle is a wreath of laurel extending to the eagle's right and wreath of olive extending to the eagle's left. On an encircling band is the inscription 'Department of Defense' and 'United States of America.'

The American bald eagle, long associated with symbolism representing the United States of America and its military establishment, has been selected as an emblem of strength. In facing to the right, the field of honor is indicated. The eagle is defending the United States, represented by the Shield of thirteen pieces. The thirteen pieces are joined together by the blue chief, representing the Congress. The rays and stars above the eagle signify glory, while the three arrows are collectively symbolic of the three component parts of the Department of War. The laurel stands for honors received in combat defending the peace represented by the olive branch.

When the seal is displayed in color, the background is to be of medium blue with the eagle and wreath in natural colors and the arrows, stars, and rays of gold. The encircling band is to be dark blue with gold edges and letters in white."

Def. Sec. Hegseth Addresses Cadet Wing at Air Force Academy in 2026, simplified seal behind him, criticized as a nazi-lookalike, with no olive branch.

== See also ==
- Seal and emblem of the United States Department of the Army
- Seal of the United States Department of Homeland Security
- Seal of the United States Space Force
- Seal of the United States Virgin Islands
- Great Seal of the United States
