= Executive Order 14347 =

2025 U.S. Department of Defense rebranding

- "Restoring the United States Department of War"
- Front page of Executive Order 14347
- Type: Executive order
- Number: 14347
- President: Donald Trump
- Signed: September 5, 2025

Federal Register details
- Federal Register document number: 2025-17508
- Publication date: September 5, 2025

Summary
- The executive order aims to rename the United States Department of Defense to the Department of War.

Executive Order 14347, titled Restoring the United States Department of War, is an executive order signed by Donald Trump, the 47th president of the United States, on September 5, 2025. Among U.S. federal agencies, the order authorized the use of the secondary title "Department of War" for the United States Department of Defense in non-statutory communications. The Defense Department now refers to itself as the "Department of War" in public and on its website, but is still technically named the Department of Defense, as only an act of Congress can formally change the name of a federal department.

== Background ==
Prior to 1947, civilian control of the United States Armed Forces was overseen by two Cabinet-level executive departments: the United States Department of War and the United States Department of the Navy. The National Security Act of 1947 reorganized the US military by establishing the National Military Establishment (NME) headed by the secretary of defense, placing the Navy Department and the War Department underneath it, renaming the latter to the Department of the Army, and spinning off the Department of the Air Force. Two years later, the National Military Establishment was renamed the Department of Defense, reportedly because "NME" was pronounced like "enemy".

== Provisions ==
The secretary of defense is authorized to use the secondary title of secretary of war, including in official correspondence and public communications. Accordingly, the Department of Defense and the Office of the Secretary of Defense are authorized to be referred to as the Department of War and Office of the Secretary of War, respectively, in the same contexts. The same standards are applied for the deputy secretary of defense and under secretaries of defense.

Other federal agencies are required to recognize and accommodate the secondary titles, though it recognizes that statutory references can only be changed by law. Accordingly, the secretary is required to submit a recommendation to the president on necessary legislative actions to accomplish the order's goal.

== Implementation ==
Shortly after Trump signed the executive order, the official website of the Department of Defense was rebranded to use the "Department of War" name and its URL was changed to "war.gov". However, the "Defense" names remain the only statutory names, as only an act of Congress can formally change these titles. In November 2025, insiders interviewed by NBC News estimated that implementation could cost $2 billion USD, with half of that amount dedicated to new letterhead and signage. When asked about the estimate, department spokesperson Sean Parnell replied that costs had not been finalized.

== Reactions ==
Trump labeled the Department of Defense name as "woke" and claimed the new name "sends a message of victory". Secretary Pete Hegseth said the decision would "set the tone for the country." Current and former department officials expressed concern over the cost of the rebranding, which would potentially require changing departmental seals on 700,000 military facilities, and logos on everything from letterheads to napkins. Larry Wilkerson, the chief of staff to former secretary of state Colin Powell described the rebranding as "very, very costly" and estimated that it could cost hundreds of millions of dollars. Others stated that the new name reflected the status of the United States as a global superpower, including representative Ryan Zinke who stated "There's a projection of power the United States has to have".

Congressional Republicans generally supported the name change, with senators Rick Scott and Mike Lee introducing legislation to formalize the change. Others, including former Senate minority leader Mitch McConnell partially criticized the change as superficial and stated that "'Peace through strength' requires investment, not just rebranding". Democrats opposed the change, particularly Illinois Democrats. Trump had threatened that the former would "learn why it's called the Department of War" by deploying federal troops to combat crime in the city. Illinois governor JB Pritzker labeled this as "not normal", while Chicago mayor Brandon Johnson called the threats "beneath the honor of our nation".

== See also ==
- List of executive actions by Donald Trump
