= RESCO =

A Renewable Energy Service Company (RESCO) is an ESCO Energy service company which provides energy to the consumers from renewable energy sources, usually solar photovoltaics, wind power or micro hydro.

RESCOs include investor owned, publicly owned, cooperatives, and community organisations.

== Main characteristics ==
The main characteristics of a RESCO are:

- The household serviced does not own the generation equipment, which is owned by an external organisation such as a Government agency or the RESCO;
- The user does not carry out maintenance, all maintenance and repair service is provided by the RESCO;
- The user pays a service charge that covers the capital repayment requirement and the cost of providing for maintenance and repairs.

The concept is much like that of a conventional electric utility in that the generation equipment is not owned by the user and the electricity that is generated is made available to the customer for a fee. The fee charged to the user includes any required capital replacement cost and all operating, maintenance and repair costs plus a profit for the operating organisation.

There are two significant differences between the conventional utility approach and that of the RESCO. For a RESCO:

- Generation may be distributed among many households instead of being centralised at a power station;
- Many organisations regulated by the government may provide services independently of each other.

== RESCOs & rural electrification ==
RESCOs have been very successful in the expansion of rural electrification projects worldwide because:

- Low income rural households receive electricity without having to invest in renewable energy equipment, something that they would not normally be able to afford due to the high initial cost.
- Equipment is properly maintained and components replaced by the RESCO, making sure that the service is not interrupted,
- Equipment is owned by an organization that directly or indirectly represents the users (beneficiaries of the funding).

As a result of all this, donors are prepared to contribute with funding to the RESCO concept because it makes their aid (1) effective, (2) sustainable and (3) accountable.

== RESCOs in the Pacific ==
Pacific Governments have provided rural electrification to remote locations by means of four main institutional set-ups, which are:

- Engaging the power utility in carrying out the rural electrification. This is the approach followed in Marshall Islands by the Marshall Electric Company (MEC) or in the Federated States of Micronesia by the Yap State Public Service Corporation (YSPSC) and the Chuuk Power Utility Corporation (CPUC).
- Setting up a different entity for the rural electrification (RESCO), but still centralising much of the decision-making process in Government officials through the nomination of a board of directors. This is the strategy applied in Kiribati, with the Kiribati Solar Energy Company Ltd (KSEC).
- Decentralising operation and maintenance by engaging the private sector, while keeping the ownership of the equipment in the hands of a government department. This is the solution followed in Fiji with the RESCO charter and in Pohnpei State (Federated States of Micronesia).
- Decentralising operation and maintenance by engaging the users, and transferring ownership of the equipment to the organisation that represents them. This was the solution followed in Tonga though the Ha'apai District Solar Electricity Committee before deciding to engage the power utility in providing the service.

== See also ==
- Off-the-grid
- Low carbon technology
- Renewable energy development
- Renewable energy economy
- Renewable energy in Africa
- Soft energy technologies
- Sustainable energy
