= Army Energy Initiatives Task Force =

US renewable energy office for the Army

The Army Energy Initiatives Task Force (EITF) serves as the central management office for partnering with United States Army installations to implement cost-effective, large-scale renewable energy projects, leveraging private sector financing" part of the Office of the Assistant Secretary of the Army for Installations, Energy and Environment. The Secretary of the Army John M. McHugh established the task force on Sept. 15, 2011.

The EITF supports the Army's goal of deploying 1 gigawatt of renewable energy by 2025.

On 1 October 2014, the Secretary of the Army directed the establishment of the permanent U.S. Army Office of Energy Initiatives (OEI).

== History ==
On April 14, 2014, the Army announced the development of a solar array at Fort Huachuca designed to provide about 25 percent of the annual electricity requirement. The project is a joint effort between the U.S. Army Energy Initiatives Task Force, Fort Huachuca, The General Services Administration, Tucson Electric Power and developer E.ON Climate and Renewables.

On February 19, 2014, ReEnergy Holdings LLC was issued a Notice of Intent (NOI) to Award by Defense Logistics Agency (DLA) for the purchase of up to 28 megawatts (MW) of electricity from a renewable energy biomass facility at Fort Drum, New York. The DLA said that the project is capable of supplying 100% of Fort Drum's electricity requirements. Fort Drum provides planning and support for the mobilization and training of almost 80,000 Army troops annually.

The EITF in 2013 made 79 contract award announcements for the Multiple Award Task Order Contract (MATOC) for Renewable and Alternative Energy Power Production at Department of Defense Installations. The MATOC is a contract vehicle that aims to establish a pool of qualified firms/contractors for biomass, solar power, geothermal and wind power technologies to compete for individual task order contracts.

== See also ==
- Energy usage of the United States military
- Energy in the United States
- United States energy law

=== External links ===
- OEI.Army.mil
- Army.mil
