= Energy usage of the United States military =

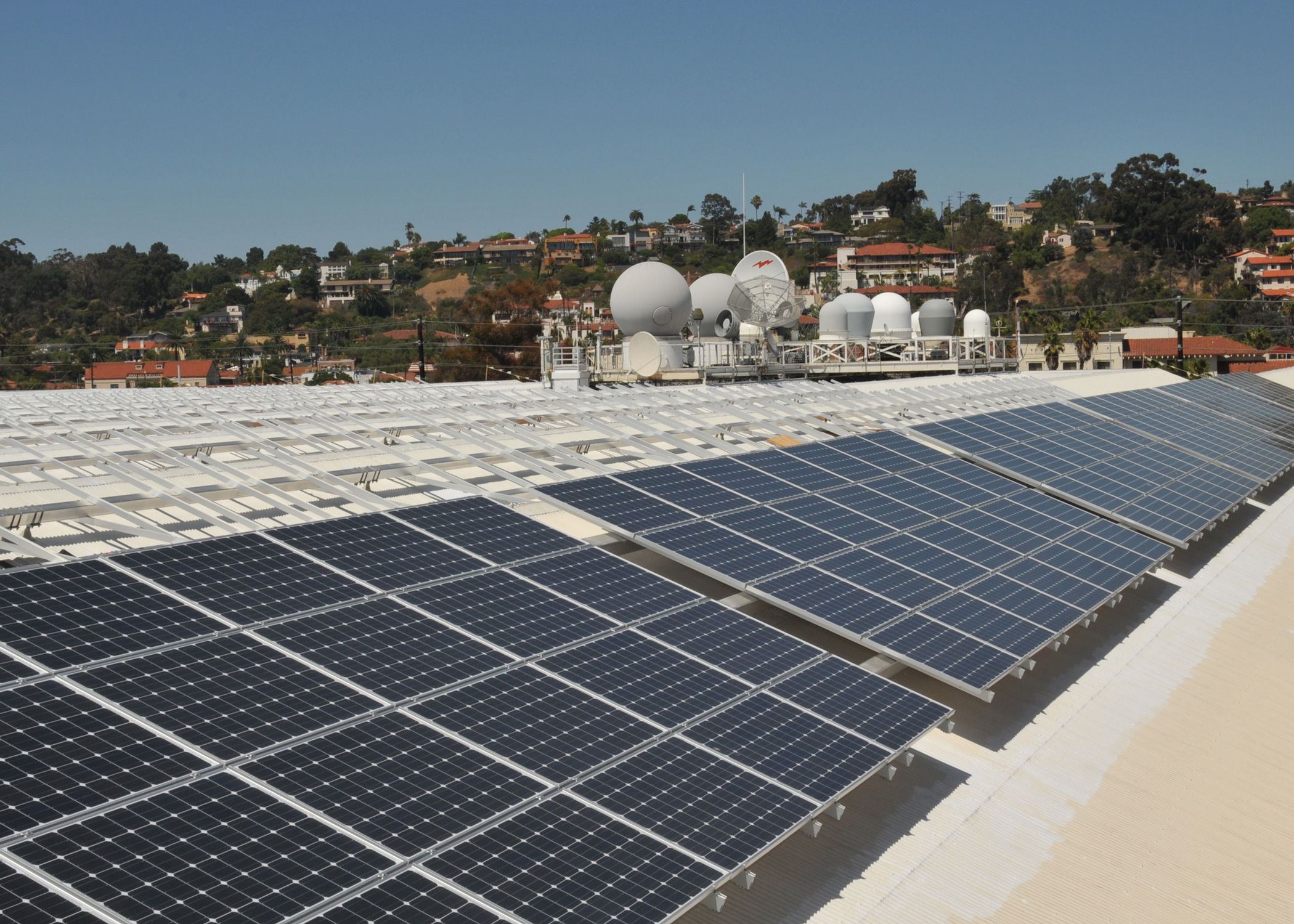
A view of solar panels installed in 2011 on the roof of Space and Naval Warfare Systems Command Headquarters, San Diego. The rooftop photovoltaic installation supports the Department of Defense's goal of increasing renewable energy sources to 25 percent of all energy consumed by the year 2025.

The United States Department of Defense is one of the largest single consumers of energy in the world, responsible for 93% of all US government fuel consumption in 2007 (Air Force: 52%; Navy: 33%; Army: 7%. Other DoD: 1%). In FY 2006, the DoD used almost 30,000 gigawatt hours (GWH) of electricity, at a cost of almost $2.2 billion. In electricity consumption, if it were a country, the DoD would rank 58th in the world, using slightly less than Denmark and slightly more than Syria (CIA World Factbook, 2006). The Department of Defense uses 4,600,000,000 US gallons (1.7×10^{10} L) of fuel annually, an average of 12,600,000 US gallons (48,000,000 L) of fuel per day. According to the 2005 CIA World Factbook, if it were a country, the DoD would rank 34th in the world in average daily oil use, coming in just behind Iraq and just ahead of Sweden.

== General ==
The military recognizes that renewable energy can provide improvements in force safety and budget stability as well as mitigate climate change so it has several programs working on deploying alternative energy at major facilities and in forward operating bases. Admiral Samuel J. Locklear has called climate change the biggest concern for the United States military.

== Air Force ==
The Air Force is the largest user of fuel energy in the federal government. The Air Force uses 10% of the nation's aviation fuel. (JP-8 accounts for nearly 90% of its fuels.) This fuel usage breaks down as such: 82% jet fuel, 16% facility management and 2% ground vehicle/equipment. To meet renewable energy goals, the Air Force plans to certify its entire fleet on coal-to-liquid synthetic fuel blends by 2011. By 2016, it plans to fuel half of its domestic transportation by US-produced synthetic blends, including blends of biofuels and jetfuels, known as Hydrotreated Renewable Jet (HRJ). The Air Force is currently the leading purchaser of renewable energy within the Federal government and has been a long time pioneer of renewable energy development and leadership. The Air Force is recognized by the Environmental Protection Agency as a Green Power Partner, one of the nation's top purchasers of green power. The Air Force Energy Plan, published in May 2010, includes more information about the Air Force's goals, including reducing demand, increasing supply, and changing the culture to include energy awareness.

== Office of the Assistant Secretary of Defense for Operational Energy Plans and Programs ==
In 2010, DoD established the Office of the Assistant Secretary of Operational Energy Plans and Programs to coordinate energy issues. In July 2010, DoD also signed a Memorandum of Understanding with the U.S. Department of Energy to facilitate cooperation and accelerate research, development, and deployment of energy efficiency and renewable energy technologies. DoD's Energy Conservation Investment Program (ECIP) improves the energy and water efficiency of existing Military Services' facilities. The program's projects help the Military Services save on energy usage and cost. The American Recovery and Reinvestment Act of 2009 provided $120 million for the ECIP. The American Recovery and Reinvestment Act of 2009 has also given money for the Army, Navy, Marine Corps, Air Force, Army Reserve, Navy Reserve, Marine Corps Reserve, Air Force Reserve, Army National Guard and Air National Guard facilities to invest in energy efficiency.

== Recent developments ==
In 2009, the US Army stated that it had prioritized renewable energy strategies in Iraq. Strategies include the Tactical Garbage to Energy Refinery Program, which converts 1 short ton (0.91 t) of waste to 11 US gal (42 L) of JP-8 fuel, a photovoltaic flexible, portable mat, insulating foam technology, hybrid-electric Manned Ground Vehicles (MGV), and highly efficient portable cells. The American Recovery and Reinvestment Act gave more than $150 million to develop these technologies. Stateside, the Army created the Net Zero program with a goal to have 30 installations achieve net-zero energy by 2030, including some that will also be net-zero in waste and water. In 2011, they opened the Base Camp Systems Integration Laboratory, which compares an energy efficient base camp with a traditional one and trains soldiers to use energy efficient technologies. The Army Energy Security Implementation Strategy, published in 2009, gives details about the Army's energy goals.

The Department of the Navy established Task Force Energy to focus on meeting energy goals, which include reducing non-tactical petroleum use in the commercial fleet by 50 percent by 2015, producing at least 50 percent of shore based energy from alternative sources by 2050, acquiring 50 percent of total energy from alternative sources by 2020, and having 50 percent of Navy and Marine Corps installations be net-zero by 2020. The Navy hopes to demonstrate a Green Strike Group (fueled by biofuels and nuclear power) by 2012 and sail the Great Green Fleet by 2016. The Office of Naval Research developed and deployed the Experimental Forward Operating Base (ExFOB), including photovoltaic energy, shelter insulation, small unit water purification, and energy efficient heating, lighting, and cooling.

The Marine Corps established the Expeditionary Energy Office to increase combat effectiveness by reducing the need for liquid fossil fuel by 50 percent by 2025, using liquid fuel for mobility only.

The Defense Department plans to invest $9 billion to improve energy use in military operations through 2017.

Through the SolarStrong program, a total of 300MW of PV installations were done on 120,000 roofs of base housing throughout the U.S. The 14MW Nellis Solar Power Plant went online in 2007. Fort Bliss has a 1.4MW PV array as well as 13MW of base housing PV and a second 15MW solar farm should be online in 2015. Fort Irwin had initially proposed a 500MW PV farm but 15MW solar farm was later awarded for construction with a separate 2MW PV system at the base hospital. A 14MW PV plant was built at China Lake in 2011.

Fort Drum converted a coal power plant to a 28MW biomass plant. In 2014, the U.S. military invested $210 million in 3 biofuel refineries which will produce fuels which meet military specifications.

== See also ==
- Energy in the United States
- United States energy law
- Army Energy Initiatives Task Force
- SolarStrong
