= Uçar =

Uçar v surname. Notable people with the surname include:

- Ahmet Uçar, Turkish academic
- Alper Uçar, Turkish figure skater
- Feyyaz Uçar, Turkish footballer
- Turgut Uçar, Turkish football manager
- Uğur Uçar, Turkish footballer
- Ümmühan Uçar, Turkish female weightlifter
- Ömer Uçar, Turkish Actor
