= Florida Municipal Electric Association =

- Company type: Trade association
- Industry: Electric power industry
- Founded: 1942
- Headquarters: Tallahassee, FL, United States
- Key people: Amy Zubaly, executive director
- Website: www.flpublicpower.com

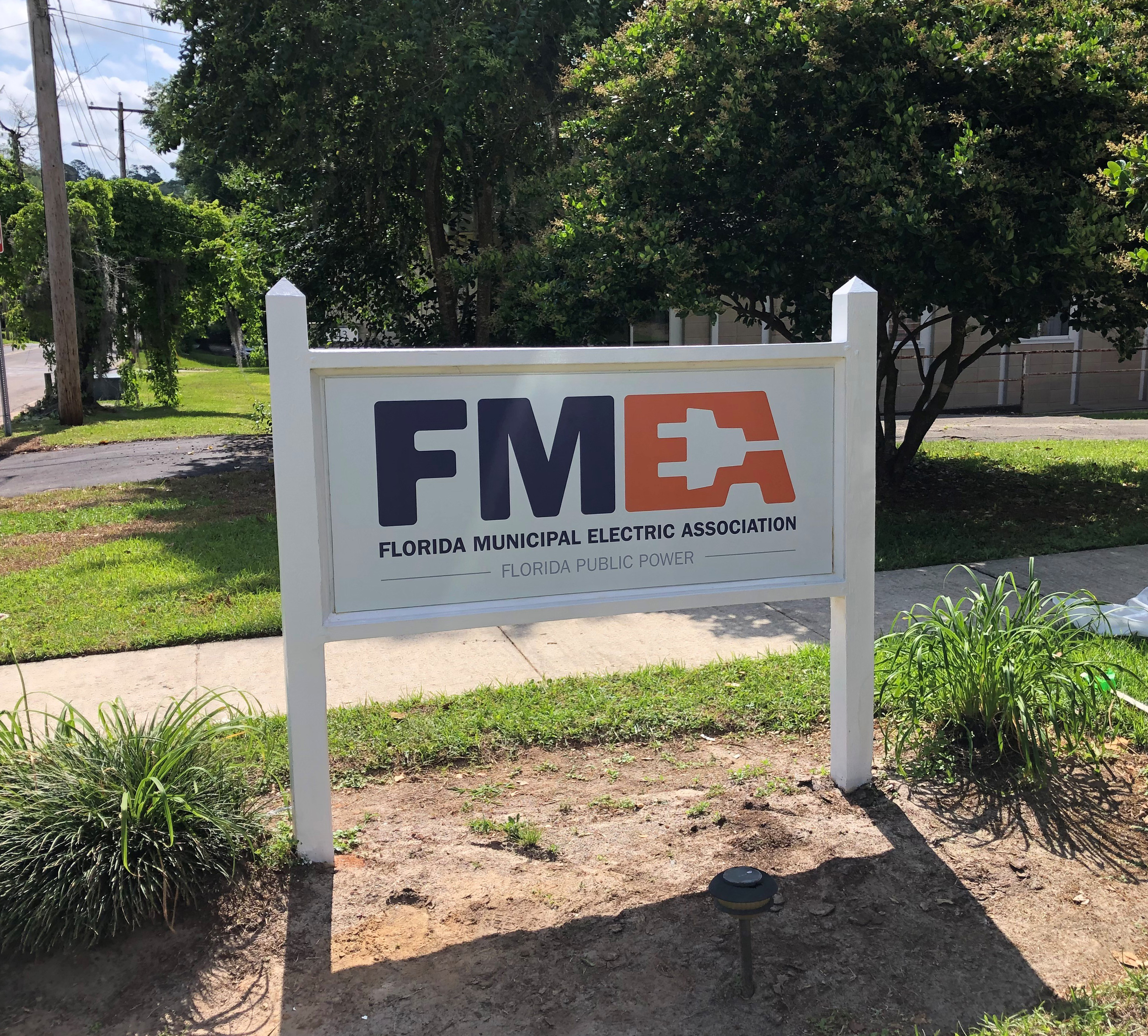
In May 2021, FMEA launched a rebranded logo specially designed to represent the association’s identity and mission. The electrical plug in the logo is symbolic of the association’s core purpose: to connect their members with each other and with industry partners and to plug their members into the latest industry news and information.

The Florida Municipal Electric Association (FMEA) is the non-profit trade association representing the unified interests of Florida’s 33 public power communities.

Based in Tallahassee, FMEA was established in 1942 in response to WWII fuel shortages.

== Member Utilities ==
- Alachua
- Bartow
- Beaches Energy Services
- Blountstown
- Bushnell
- Central Florida Tourism Oversight District
- Chattahoochee
- Clewiston
- Fort Meade
- Fort Pierce Utilities Authority
- Gainesville Regional Utilities
- Green Cove Springs
- Havana
- Homestead Public Services
- JEA
- Keys Energy Services
- Kissimmee Utility Authority
- Lake Worth Beach Utilities
- Lakeland Electric
- Leesburg
- Moore Haven
- Mount Dora
- New Smyrna Beach Utilities
- Newberry
- Ocala Electric Utility
- Orlando Utilities Commission
- Quincy
- St. Cloud
- Starke
- Tallahassee
- Wauchula
- Williston
- Winter Park

== See also ==
- United States energy law
