= Price–Anderson Nuclear Industries Indemnity Act =

United States federal law to indemnify the nuclear industry against liability claims

- Long title: An Act to amend the Atomic Energy Act of 1954, as amended, and for other purposes.
- Nicknames: Price-Anderson Act
- Enacted by: the 85th United States Congress
- Effective: September 2, 1957

Citations
- Public law: 85-256
- Statutes at Large: 71 Stat. 576

Codification
- Titles amended: 42 U.S.C.: Public Health and Social Welfare
- U.S.C. sections created: 42 U.S.C. ch. 23

Legislative history
- Introduced in the House as H.R. 7383; Signed into law by President Dwight D. Eisenhower on September 2, 1957

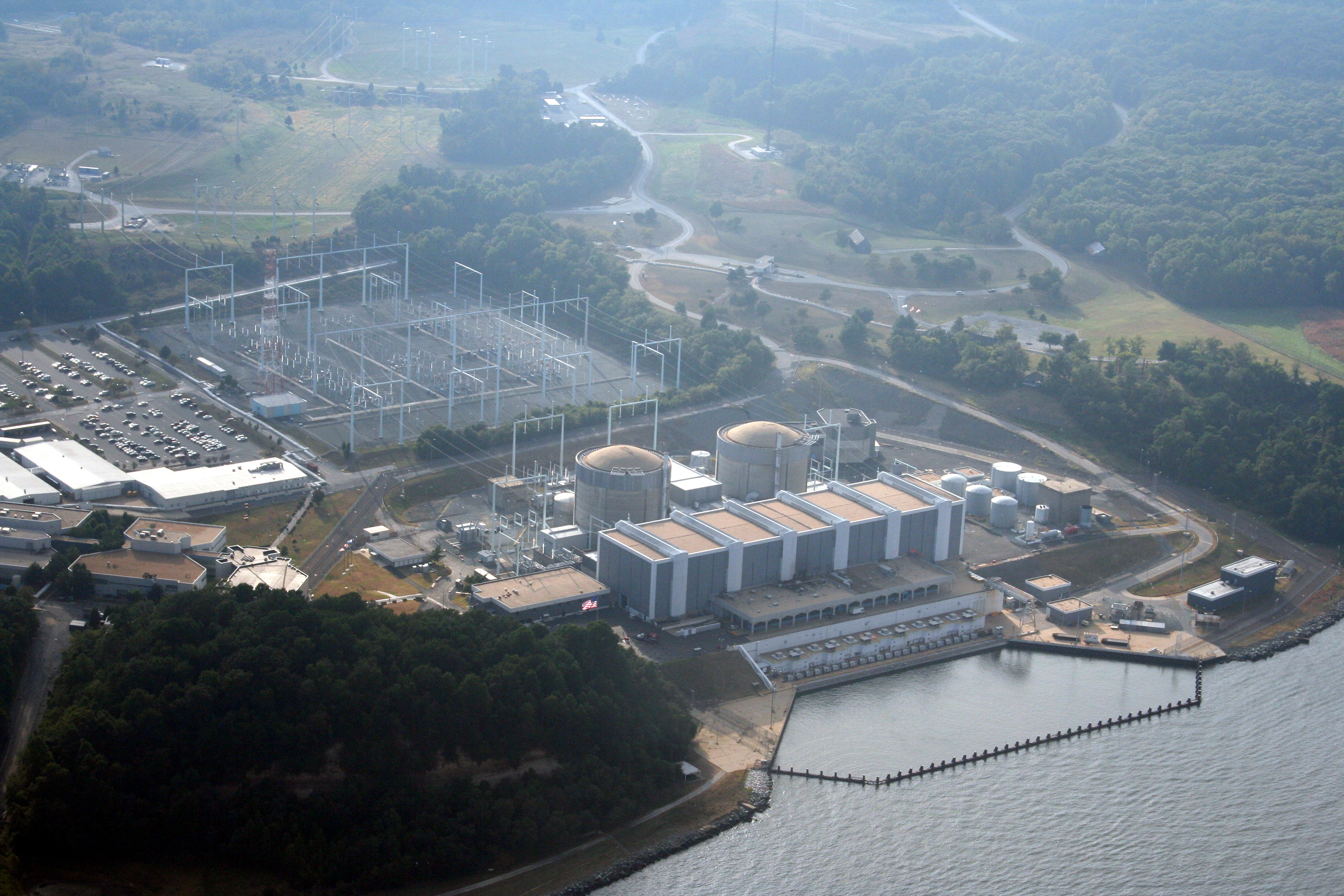
Calvert Cliffs Nuclear Power Plant

The Price-Anderson Nuclear Industries Indemnity Act (commonly called the Price-Anderson Act) is a United States federal law, first passed in 1957 and since renewed several times, which governs liability-related issues for all non-military nuclear facilities constructed in the United States before 2026. The main purpose of the Act is to partially compensate the nuclear industry against liability claims arising from nuclear incidents while still ensuring compensation coverage for the general public. The Act establishes a no fault insurance-type system in which the first approximately $15 billion (as of 2021) is industry-funded as described in the Act. Any claims above the $15 billion would be covered by a Congressional mandate to retroactively increase nuclear utility liability or would be covered by the federal government. At the time of the Act's passing, it was considered necessary as an incentive for the private production of nuclear power — this was because electric utilities viewed the available liability coverage (only $60 million) as inadequate.

In 1978, the Act survived a constitutional challenge in the Supreme Court case Duke Power Co. v. Carolina Environmental Study Group (see below). The Act's indemnification policy was last renewed in 2024 through 2045 within the ADVANCE Act.

== How the law works ==
=== Funding and procedures ===
Power reactor licensees are required by the act to obtain the maximum amount of insurance against nuclear related incidents which is available in the insurance market (as of 2017, $450 million per reactor). Any monetary claims that fall within this maximum amount are paid by the insurer(s). The Price-Anderson fund, which is financed by the reactor companies themselves, is then used to make up the difference. As of September 2013, each reactor company is obliged to contribute up to $121,255,000 per reactor in the event of an accident with claims that exceed the $450 million insurance limit. As of 2013, the maximum amount of the fund is approximately $12.61 billion ($121,255,000 × 104 reactors) if all of the reactor companies were required to pay their full obligation to the fund. This fund is not paid into unless an accident occurs. However, fund administrators are required to have contingency plans in place to raise funds using loans to the fund, so that claimants may be paid as soon as possible. Actual payments by companies in the event of an accident are capped at $18,963,000 per year until either a claim has been met, or their maximum individual liability (the $121,255,000 maximum) has been reached. This results in a maximum combined primary+secondary coverage amount of up to $13.06 billion for a hypothetical single-reactor incident.

If a coverable incident occurs, the Nuclear Regulatory Commission (NRC) is required to submit a report on the cost of it to the courts and to Congress. If claims are likely to exceed the maximum Price-Anderson fund value, then the President is required to submit proposals to Congress. These proposals must detail the costs of the accident, recommend how funds should be raised, and detail plans for full and prompt compensation to those affected. Under the Act, the administrators of the fund have the right to further charge plants if it is needed. If Congress fails to provide for compensation, claims can be made under the Tucker Act (in which the government waives its sovereign immunity) for failure by the federal government to carry out its duty to compensate claimants.

Price-Anderson also covers Department of Energy (DOE) facilities, private licensees, and their subcontractors including the USEC uranium enrichment plants, national laboratories and the Yucca Mountain nuclear waste repository. Any payments from the fund for accidents arising at DOE facilities come from the US treasury. The fund size for such installations is set by legislation (also at $12.6 billion), rather than being based upon the number of plants contributing to the fund.

Since Price-Anderson was enacted, nuclear insurance pools have paid out about $151 million ($70 million of which was related to the 1979 Three Mile Island accident) in claims, while the Department of Energy has paid out $65 million.

=== Alterations to normal civil court procedures ===
The Act makes a number of changes to typical civil court procedures:

- Jurisdiction is automatically transferred to federal courts no matter where the accident occurred.
- All claims from the same incident are consolidated into one Federal court, which is responsible for prioritizing payouts and sharing funds equitably should there be a shortfall.
- Companies are expressly forbidden to defend any action for damages on the grounds that an incident was not their fault.
- An open-ended time limit is applied, which allows claimants three years to file a claim starting from the time they discover damage.
- Individuals are not allowed to claim punitive damages against companies. (The act makes no provision for punishing companies responsible for an incident, but nuclear licensing regulations specify fines for breaches of safety regulations and criminal charges which may apply remain unaffected.)

== History of the Act ==
=== Origins ===
The Price-Anderson Act is named for Representative Charles Melvin Price (D-IL) and Senator Clinton Presba Anderson (D-NM), both of whom eventually chaired Congress's Joint Committee on Atomic Energy.

The Atomic Energy Act of 1946, which followed the development of nuclear technology during World War II, had created a framework for operation of nuclear plants under government control. The intention of the government was to apply this technology to civilian industry, especially in using nuclear plants to generate electricity. In 1954, the Atomic Energy Act Amendments Act removed the government monopoly on operating nuclear plants by creating a licensing system for private operators. The structure of the insurance industry as it existed until 1955 was incapable of providing the extent of coverage needed to adequately address the risks of nuclear power. The "amount of insurance required could not be underwritten at the time by any single or joint company effort".

A power plant, Shippingport, was eventually constructed, but electric utility executives expressed concerns about limited size of liability coverage offered by the insurance market ($60 million). A nuclear accident of privately held nuclear power appeared to be an impossible barrier since the possible magnitude of claims could bankrupt any electric utility held responsible. Nor could an insurance company offer insurance policies with limits beyond its own resources to pay. Because of these difficulties, it looked like it would be extremely unlikely that electric utilities would want to enter the nuclear power industry.

The potential magnitude of worst-case accidents has been the subject of several major studies, such as WASH-740, WASH-1400, CRAC-II, and NUREG-1150. In November 2012, the Nuclear Regulatory Commission (NRC) published State-of-the-Art Reactor Consequence Analyses (SOARCA), which examines potential safety failures with probabilities of "occurring more than once in a million reactor years, or more than once in ten million reactor years for accidents that may bypass containment features".

To address these issues, Congress introduced the Price-Anderson Act in 1957. The Act required companies to obtain the maximum possible insurance coverage against accidents, determined to be $60 million, and provided a further government commitment of $500 million to cover any claims in excess of the private insurance. Companies were relieved of any liability beyond the insured amount for any incident involving radiation or radioactive releases regardless of fault or cause. The act was intended to be temporary, and to expire in August 1967 as it was assumed that once the companies had demonstrated a record of safe operation, they would be able to obtain insurance in the private market. At the same time, Congress encouraged the insurance industry to develop a way that power plant operators could meet their financial protection responsibilities. The insurance industry responded by creating an insurance pool called American Nuclear Insurers (ANI), which today includes 60 U.S. property and casualty insurance companies who represent some of the largest insurance companies in the country.

=== Extensions ===
By 1966, it had become apparent that the industry would still be unable to obtain adequate private insurance, so the act was extended until 1976. A provision was added to the Act which prevented companies from offering certain defenses to damages claims (particularly defenses which claimed that the accident had not been their fault). A minimum time limit was also introduced (which could be surpassed by state law), giving claimants three years after discovering harm in which to make a claim. The alterations were intended to make the process of obtaining funds from reactor companies easier, and to remove discrepancies in different states where different laws applied. The new provisions only applied to incidents where a significant escape of radioactive material was deemed to have occurred (an ENO, extraordinary nuclear occurrence).

In 1975, the act was extended for 12 years, up until 1987. The total amount of insurance remained the same, but a provision was added requiring each of the 60 or so reactors then in existence to contribute between $2 million and $5 million in the event of an uninsured accident. The insurance ceiling for each individual company was increased to $140 million. These measures eliminated the contribution of the federal government to the insurance pool. However, an explicit commitment was made that in the event of a larger accident, Congress would take whatever actions were necessary to provide full and prompt claims to the public. This included the possibility of additional charges to reactor companies above and beyond the prescribed limits set forth in the Act.

In 1988, the act was extended for 15 years up to August 2002. Individual insurance for each generator was increased to $200 million, and the total fund to $9.5 billion. For each reactor owned, the reactor company was liable to contribute up to $63 million towards compensation for any claim against any company, though this could only be recovered at a maximum rate of $10 million per year. Assessments were to be adjusted for inflation every 5 years. The same level of indemnity was provided for government DOE facilities, while small reactors (education and research oriented) were required to obtain $250,000 insurance and have a government-backed pool of $500 million in the event of accident. This extension provided that all cases resulting from a nuclear accident to be heard in a federal court, rather than local courts.

In February 2002, the act was temporarily extended to December 2003. After some debate in 2003, the Act was extended to 2017. The individual insurance for each site was increased to $300 million while fund contributions per reactor were increased to $95.8 million. In 2005, it was extended again through 2025 via the Energy Policy Act of 2005.

In July 2024, the act was extended through 2045 as part of the ADVANCE Act.

=== Usage ===
Over the first 43 years of the Price-Anderson Act to 2000, the secondary insurance was not required. A total of $151 million was paid to cover claims (including legal expenses), all from primary insurance, including $71 million for Three Mile Island. Additionally, the Department of Energy paid about $65 million to cover claims under liability for its own nuclear operations in the same period.

== Constitutional challenge ==
The constitutionality of the Price-Anderson Act was upheld in June 1978 by the Supreme Court in the case of Duke Power Co. v. Carolina Environmental Study Group link. The lawsuit challenged the act on two grounds — first, that it violated the Fifth Amendment because it did not ensure adequate compensation for victims of accidents, and that it violated the Fourteenth Amendment because it treats nuclear accidents differently from other accidents.

The court concluded:

- It is clear that Congress' purpose was to remove the economic impediments in order to stimulate the private development of electric energy by nuclear power while simultaneously providing the public compensation in the event of a catastrophic nuclear incident.
- The record supports the need for the imposition of a statutory limit on liability to encourage private industry participation and hence bears a rational relationship to Congress' concern for stimulating private industry's involvement in the production of nuclear electric energy.
- The Price-Anderson Act does, in our view, provide a reasonably just substitute for the common-law or state tort law remedies it replaces.
- The District Court's finding that the Act tends to encourage irresponsibility in matters of safety and environmental protection cannot withstand careful scrutiny, since nothing in the liability-limitation provision undermines or alters the rigor and integrity of the process involved in the review of applications for a license to construct or operate a nuclear power plant, and since, in the event of a nuclear accident the utility itself would probably suffer the largest damages.
- We view the congressional assurance of a [then] $560 million fund for recovery, accompanied by an express statutory commitment, to "take whatever action is deemed necessary [438 U.S. 59, 91] and appropriate to protect the public from the consequences of" a nuclear accident, 42 U.S.C. 2210 (e) (1970 ed., Supp. V), to be a fair and reasonable substitute for the uncertain recovery of damages of this magnitude from a utility or component manufacturer, whose resources might well be exhausted at an early stage.
- There is no equal protection violation, since the general rationality of the Act's liability limitation, particularly with reference to the congressional purpose of encouraging private participation in the exploitation of nuclear energy, is ample justification for the difference in treatment between those injured in nuclear accidents and those whose injuries are derived from other causes.

== Compared to other industries ==
US law requires payment of 8 cents per barrel of oil to the Oil Spill Liability Trust Fund for all oil imported or produced. In exchange for the payment, operators of offshore oil platforms, among others, are limited in liability to $75 million for damages, which can be paid by the fund, but are not indemnified from the cost of cleanup. As of 2010, before payouts related to the Deepwater Horizon drilling rig explosion, the fund stood at $1.6 billion.

The hydroelectric industry is not generally held financially liable for catastrophic incidents such as dam failure or resultant flooding. For example, dam operators were not held liable for the 1977 failure of the Teton Dam in Idaho that caused approximately $500 million in property damage.

While many industries have no explicit liability cap, in practice, liability in such industries may be limited to the assets of the company held to be at fault. In addition, liability can be disputed in the absence of strict liability laws. As a non-power example, after the 1984 Bhopal disaster, the Union Carbide Corporation claimed the accident was caused by sabotage and settled for only $470 million.

== Criticisms ==
The Price-Anderson Act has been criticized by various think tanks and environmental organizations, including Union of Concerned Scientists, Greenpeace International, Public Citizen and the Cato Institute. Public Citizen has been particularly critical of Price-Anderson; it claims that the Act understates the risks inherent in atomic power, does not require reactors to carry adequate insurance, and would therefore result in taxpayers footing most of the bill for a catastrophic accident. An analysis by economists Heyes and Heyes (1998) places the value of the government insurance subsidy at $2.3 million per reactor-year, or $237 million annually. In 2008, the Congressional Budget Office estimated the value of the subsidy at only $600,000 per reactor per year, or less than one percent of the levelized cost for new nuclear capacity. All such calculations are controversial, as they rely on the difficult assessment of extrapolating what the "true" probabilities are of a catastrophic event at the extreme cost brackets. Due to the structure of the liability immunities, as the number of nuclear plants in operation is reduced, the public liability in case of an accident goes up. However, going in the other direction, the Nuclear Waste Fund was/is used to transfer $750 million in fee revenues each year from utilities to the Government and this is hard currency, unlike the conceptual insurance/indemnity Act.

The Price-Anderson Act has been used as an example of corporate welfare by Ralph Nader.

Price-Anderson has been criticized by many of these groups due to a portion of the Act that indemnifies Department of Energy and private contractors from nuclear incidents even in cases of gross negligence and willful misconduct (although criminal penalties would still apply). "No other government agency provides this level of taxpayer indemnification to non-government personnel". The Energy Department counters those critics by saying that the distinction is irrelevant, since the damage to the public would be the same.

These beyond-insurance costs for worst-case scenarios are not unique to nuclear power, as hydroelectric power plants are similarly not fully insured against a catastrophic event such as the Banqiao Dam disaster, or large dam failures in general. As private insurers base dam insurance premiums on limited scenarios, major disaster insurance in this sector is likewise provided by the Government.

== See also ==
- Nuclear Waste Policy Act
- Contract adjustment board
- Energy Policy Act of 2005
- List of civilian nuclear accidents
- Nuclear accidents in the United States
- Nuclear power accidents by country
- Nuclear energy policy
- Nuclear power
- Nuclear Power 2010 Program
- Nuclear power debate
- Nuclear power in the United States
- Nuclear safety
- Nuclear safety in the United States
- Public Law 85-804
- United States Department of Energy
- United States Atomic Energy Commission
- Vienna Convention on Civil Liability for Nuclear Damage
