= Duke Power Co. v. Carolina Environmental Study Group =

- Supreme Court of the United States

Argued March 20, 1978 Decided June 26, 1978
- Full case name: Duke Power Company v. Carolina Environmental Study Group, Inc., et al.
- Citations: 438 U.S. 59 (more) 98 S. Ct. 2620; 57 L. Ed. 2d 595; 1978 U.S. LEXIS 38; 11 ERC (BNA) 1753; 8 ELR 20545; 8 ELR 20545

Case history
- Prior: Carolina Envtl. Study Grp., Inc. v. U.S. Atomic Energy Comm'n, 431 F. Supp. 203 (W.D.N.C. 1977); probable jurisdiction noted, 434 U.S. 937 (1977).

Holding
- The Price Anderson Act does not violate equal protection by treating victims of nuclear accidents differently from the victims of other industrial accidents.

Court membership
- Chief Justice Warren E. Burger Associate Justices William J. Brennan Jr. · Potter Stewart; Byron White · Thurgood Marshall; Harry Blackmun · Lewis F. Powell Jr. William Rehnquist · John P. Stevens

Case opinions
- Majority: Burger, joined by Brennan, White, Marshall, Blackmun, Powell
- Concurrence: Stewart
- Concurrence: Rehnquist, joined by Stevens
- Concurrence: Stevens

Laws applied
- Price Anderson Act; Fourteenth Amendment

Duke Power Co. v. Carolina Environmental Study Group, 438 U.S. 59 (1978), was a case in which the United States Supreme Court overturned the United States District Court for the Western District of North Carolina's decision that the Price Anderson Act violated equal protection by treating victims of nuclear accidents differently from the victims of other industrial accidents.

== Background ==
Several groups filed suit in the United States District Court for the Western District of North Carolina against the Nuclear Regulatory Commission, regarding the Price Anderson Act. The suit challenged it on two grounds; it violated the Fifth Amendment because it did not ensure adequate compensation for victims of accidents, and it violated the Fourteenth Amendment because it treated nuclear accidents differently from other accidents.

== Decision ==
The Court found that the differential treatments of industrial victims did not constitute a violation of equal protection, based on the reasons Congress gave for liability limitations: "There is no equal protection violation, since the general rationality of the Act's liability limitation, particularly with reference to the congressional purpose of encouraging private participation in the exploitation of nuclear energy, is ample justification for the difference in treatment between those injured in nuclear accidents and those whose injuries are derived from other causes."

The court summarised the circumstances leading up to the act:

- "Private industry responded to the Atomic Energy Act of 1954 with the development of an experimental power plant constructed under the auspices of a consortium of interested companies. It soon became apparent that profits from the private exploitation of atomic energy were uncertain and the accompanying risks substantial. Although the AEC offered incentives to encourage investment, there remained in the path of the private nuclear power industry various problems - the risk of potentially vast liability in the event of a nuclear accident of a sizable magnitude being the major obstacle. Notwithstanding comprehensive testing and study, the uniqueness of this form of energy production made it impossible totally to rule out the risk of a major nuclear accident resulting in extensive damage. Private industry and the AEC were confident that such a disaster would not occur, but the very uniqueness of nuclear power meant that the possibility remained, and the potential liability dwarfed the ability of the industry and private insurance companies to absorb the risk. Thus, while repeatedly stressing that the risk of a major nuclear accident was extremely remote, spokesmen for the private sector informed Congress that they would be forced to withdraw from the field if their liability were not limited by appropriate legislation."

The court also concluded:

- "...it is clear that Congress' purpose was to remove the economic impediments in order to stimulate the private development of electric energy by nuclear power while simultaneously providing the public compensation in the event of a catastrophic nuclear incident."
- "The record supports the need for the imposition of a statutory limit on liability to encourage private industry participation and hence bears a rational relationship to Congress' concern for stimulating private industry's involvement in the production of nuclear electric energy.
- the Price-Anderson Act does, in our view, provide a reasonably just substitute for the common-law or state tort law remedies it replaces.
- "The District Court's finding that the Act tends to encourage irresponsibility in matters of safety and environmental protection cannot withstand careful scrutiny, since nothing in the liability-limitation provision undermines or alters the rigor and integrity of the process involved in the review of applications for a license to construct or operate a nuclear power plant, and since, in the event of a nuclear accident the utility itself would probably suffer the largest damages."
- "We view the congressional assurance of a [then] $560 million fund for recovery, accompanied by an express statutory commitment, to 'take whatever action is deemed necessary [438 U.S. 59, 91] and appropriate to protect the public from the consequences of' a nuclear accident, 42 U.S.C. 2210(e) (1970 ed., Supp. V), to be a fair and reasonable substitute for the uncertain recovery of damages of this magnitude from a utility or component manufacturer, whose resources might well be exhausted at an early stage."
- "There is no equal protection violation, since the general rationality of the Act's liability limitation, particularly with reference to the congressional purpose of encouraging private participation in the exploitation of nuclear energy, is ample justification for the difference in treatment between those injured in nuclear accidents and those whose injuries are derived from other causes."

== See also ==
- List of United States Supreme Court cases, volume 438
