= United States Department of Defense =

Executive department of the federal government

- Seal of the Department of Defense (Note: In September 2025, Executive Order 14347 authorized the usage of "Department of War" as a secondary name, which is now preferred by the department. "Department of Defense" remains the statutory name. The secretary of defense may institute a new seal with the approval of the president, without Congress's approval.)

- Logo of the Department of Defense

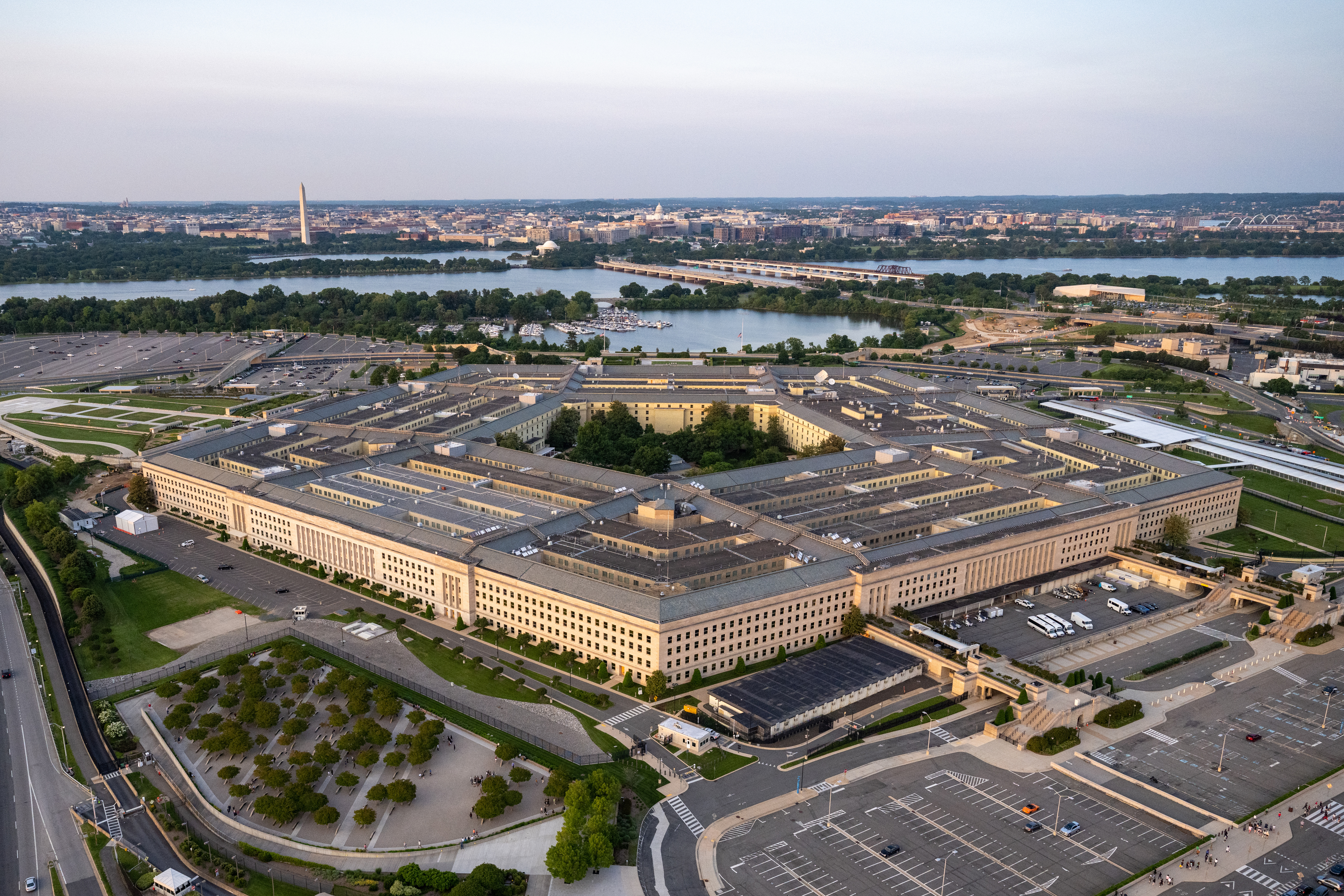
- An aerial view of the Pentagon

Agency overview
- Formed: 18 September 1947; 79 years ago (as National Military Establishment)
- Preceding agencies: Department of War; Department of the Navy
- Type: Executive department
- Jurisdiction: U.S. federal government
- Headquarters: The Pentagon Arlington County, Virginia, U.S.; 38°52′16″N 77°3′21″W
- Employees: 789,594 (civilian); 1,294,191 (active duty military); 761,601 (National Guard and reserve); 2,845,386 total (30 June 2024)
- Annual budget: $842 billion FY2024
- Agency executives: Pete Hegseth, Secretary; Steve Feinberg, Deputy Secretary; Dan Caine, Chairman of the Joint Chiefs of Staff; Christopher Mahoney, Vice Chairman of the Joint Chiefs of Staff
- Child agencies: Department of the Army; Department of the Navy; Department of the Air Force; National Security Agency; Defense Intelligence Agency; National Geospatial-Intelligence Agency; National Reconnaissance Office
- Website: war.gov

The United States Department of Defense (DoD), also referred to as the Department of War (DoW), is an executive department of the United States federal government charged with coordinating and supervising the United States Armed Forces—the Army, Navy, Marines, Air Force, Space Force, and, for some purposes, the Coast Guard—and related functions and agencies. Headquartered at the Pentagon in Arlington County, Virginia, just outside Washington, D.C., the department says its mission is "to provide the military forces needed to deter war and ensure our nation's security".

The department is headed by the secretary of defense, a cabinet-level official who reports directly to the president of the United States. The president is commander-in-chief of the U.S. Armed Forces. The department has three subordinate military departments: the Department of the Army, the Department of the Navy, and the Department of the Air Force. In addition, four national intelligence services are part of the department: the Defense Intelligence Agency, National Security Agency (NSA), National Geospatial-Intelligence Agency, and National Reconnaissance Office.

Other department agencies include the Defense Advanced Research Projects Agency (DARPA), Defense Logistics Agency, Missile Defense Agency, Defense Health Agency, Defense Threat Reduction Agency, Defense Counterintelligence and Security Agency, Space Development Agency, and Pentagon Force Protection Agency. The department's contracts are administered by the Defense Contract Management Agency. Military operations are managed by 11 regional or functional unified combatant commands. The department also runs several joint schools, including the Eisenhower School and the National War College.

As of November 2022, the department has more than 1.4 million active-duty uniformed personnel in the six armed services, and more than 747,000 civilian employees. It also supervises more than 778,000 National Guard and reservist personnel.

== History ==
Faced with rising tensions between the Thirteen Colonies and the British government, one of the first actions taken by the First Continental Congress in September 1774 was to recommend that the colonies begin defensive military preparations. In mid-June 1775, after the outbreak of the Revolutionary War, the Second Continental Congress, recognizing the necessity of having a national army that could move about and fight beyond the boundaries of any particular colony, organized the Continental Army on 14 June 1775. Later that year, Congress would charter the Continental Navy on 13 October, and the Continental Marines on 10 November.

=== War Department and Navy Department ===
Upon the seating of the 1st U.S. Congress on 4 March 1789, legislation to create a military defense force stagnated as they focused on other concerns relevant to setting up the new government. President George Washington went to Congress to remind them of their duty to establish a military twice during this time. Finally, on the last day of the session, 29 September 1789, Congress created the War Department. The War Department handled naval affairs until Congress created the Navy Department in 1798. The secretaries of each department reported directly to the president as cabinet-level advisors until 1949, when all military departments became subordinate to the Secretary of Defense.

=== National Military Establishment ===
Seal of the Department of Defense with its statutory name

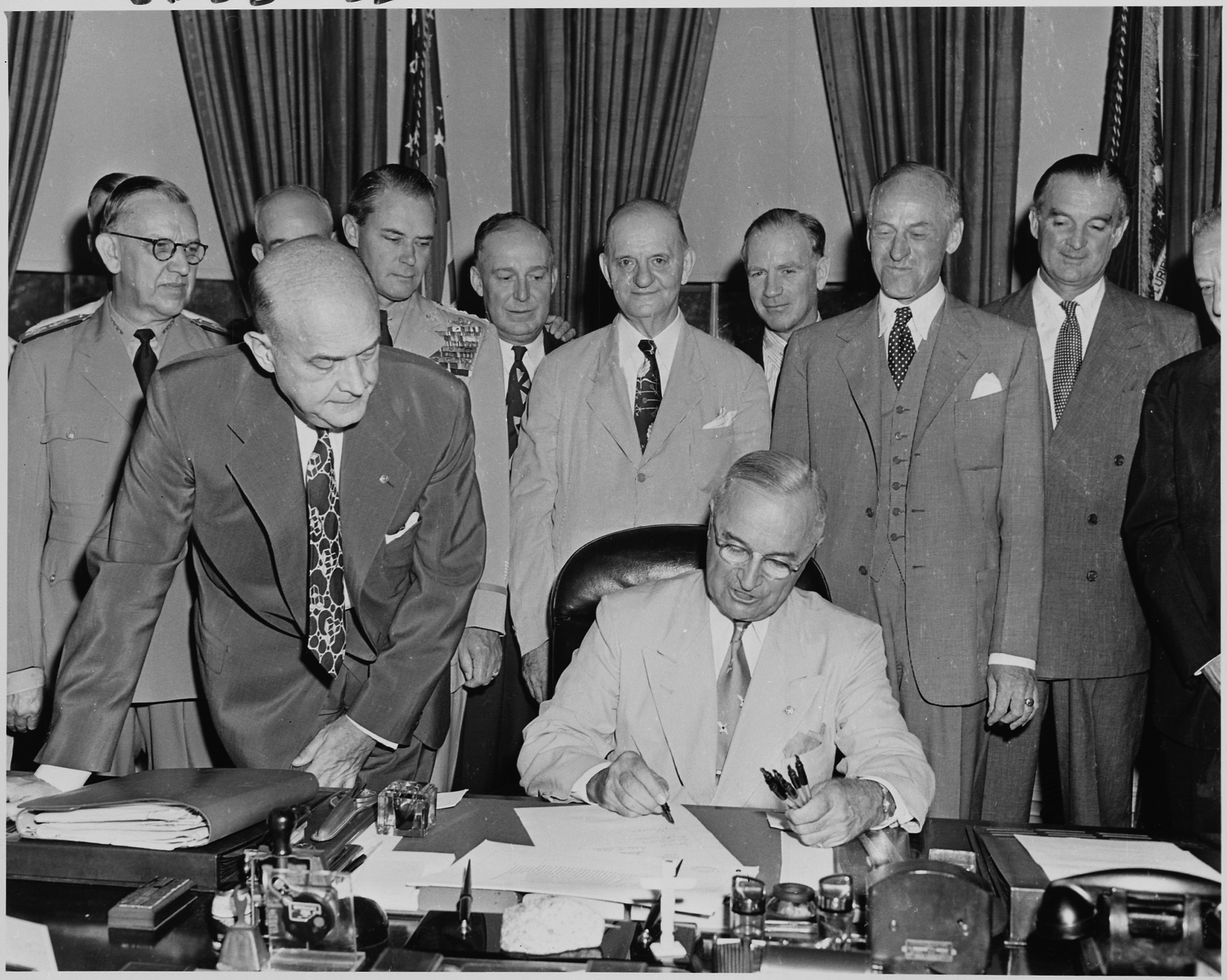
President Truman signs the National Security Act Amendment of 1949

After the end of World War II, President Harry Truman proposed the creation of a unified department of national defense. In a special message to the Congress on 19 December 1945, the president cited wasteful military spending and interdepartmental conflicts. Deliberations in Congress went on for months focusing heavily on the role of the military in society and the threat of granting too much military power to the executive.

On 26 July 1947, Truman signed the National Security Act of 1947, which "unified the Army and Navy within a single organization, the National Military Establishment, which was later renamed the Department of Defense." It established the National Military Establishment (NME) and created the National Security Council, National Security Resources Board, United States Air Force, and the Joint Chiefs of Staff.

The NME was placed under the control of the new post of secretary of defense.

The National Military Establishment formally began operations on 18 September, the day after the Senate confirmed James V. Forrestal as the first secretary of defense. The National Military Establishment was renamed the "Department of Defense" on 10 August 1949, and absorbed the three cabinet-level military departments, in an amendment to the original 1947 law.

Under the Department of Defense Reorganization Act of 1958 (Pub. L. 85–599), channels of authority within the department were streamlined while still maintaining the ordinary jurisdiction of the Military Departments to organize, train, and equip their associated forces. The Act clarified the overall decision-making authority of the secretary of defense concerning these subordinate military departments. It more clearly defined the operational chain of command over U.S. military forces (created by the military departments) as running from the president to the secretary of defense, the service chief of the unified combatant commanders, and then to the unified combatant commanders. Also provided in this legislation was a centralized research authority, the Advanced Research Projects Agency, eventually known as DARPA. The act was written and promoted by the Eisenhower administration and was signed into law on 6 August 1958.

=== Name changes ===
Simplified logo of the US Department of War

By the National Security Act of 1947, the Department of the Navy and the Department of War had a new single Secretary imposed over the top of their two previously independent Cabinet secretaries. The War Department also changed its name to the Department of the Army and split off the Department of the Air Force. The new Cabinet-level department was initially designated the National Military Establishment (NME). On 10 August 1949, the National Security Act of 1947 was amended; the amendment renamed the NME the Department of Defense. The renaming is alleged to be due to the NME's pronunciation as "enemy".

On 5 September 2025, President Donald Trump signed an executive order authorizing "Department of War" and "secretary of war" as secondary titles to the main titles of "Department of Defense" and "secretary of defense". The secondary titles must be accommodated by federal agencies and are permitted in executive branch communications, ceremonial settings, and non-statutory documents. However, only an act of Congress can legally and formally change the department's name and secretary's title. Trump described his rebranding as an effort to project a stronger and more bellicose name and said the statutory names were "woke". In June 2026, the House Armed Services Committee and Senate Armed Services Committee voted the proposed name change to "Department of War" out of committee as part of the 2027 National Defense Authorization Act. On 22 July, the House voted to adopt the name change as part of its version of the bill. The Senate had not set a date for a vote on the bill before adjourning for a recess until mid-September.

The proposed rebrand ignited a debate about its cost nationally and internationally, both financially for changing systems and agreements and psychologically by the message it sent. The Congressional Budget Office estimated that the change of name could cost between $10 million and $125 million, depending on the depth of implementation.

== Organizational structure ==
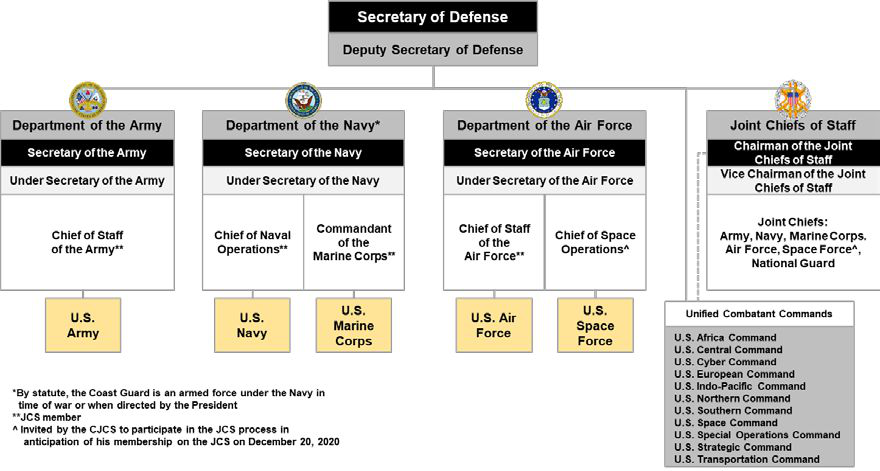
Organization of the Department of Defense following the creation of the United States Space Force

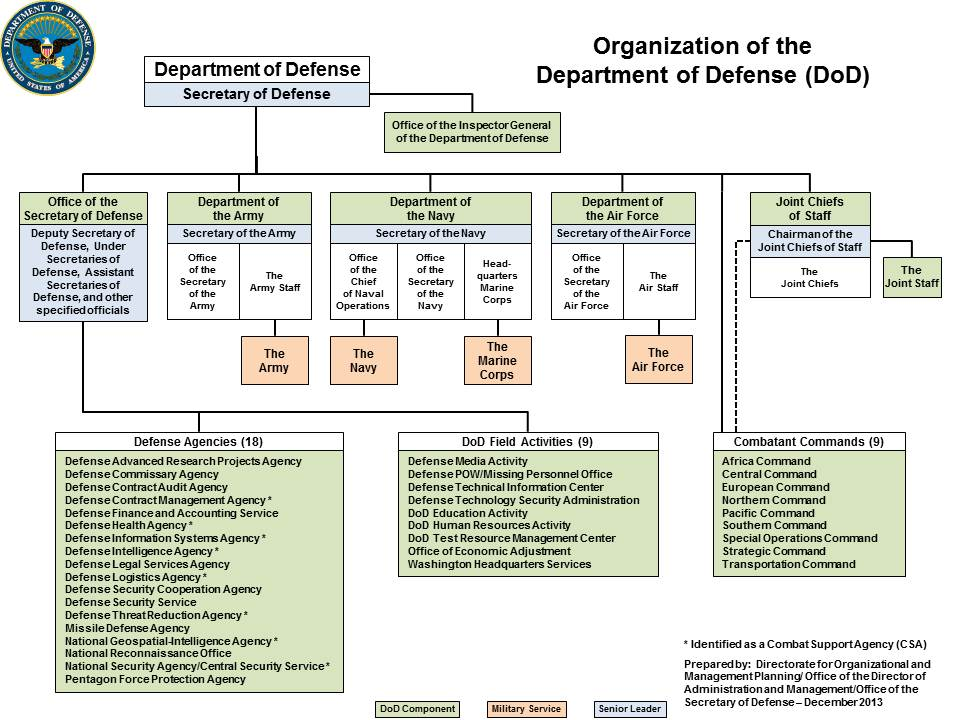
A December 2013 Department of Defense organizational chart

The secretary of defense, appointed by the president with the advice and consent of the Senate, is by federal law (10 U.S.C. § 113) the head of the Department of Defense, "the principal assistant to the President in all matters relating to Department of Defense", and has "authority, direction, and control over the Department of Defense". Because the Constitution vests all military authority in Congress and the president, the statutory authority of the secretary of defense is derived from their constitutional authority. Since it is impractical for either Congress or the president to participate in every piece of Department of Defense affairs, the secretary of defense and the secretary's subordinate officials generally exercise military authority.

The Department of Defense is composed of the Office of the Secretary of Defense, Joint Chiefs of Staff and Joint Staff, Office of the Inspector General, Combatant Commands, Military Departments (Department of the Army, Department of the Navy and Department of the Air Force), Defense Agencies and Department of Defense Field Activities, National Guard Bureau, and such other offices, agencies, activities, organizations, and commands established or designated by law, or by the president or by the secretary of defense. Department of Defense Directive 5100.01 describes the organizational relationships within the department and is the foundational issuance for delineating the major functions of the department. The latest version, signed by then–secretary of defense Robert Gates in December 2010, is the first major re-write since 1987.

=== Office of the Secretary of Defense ===
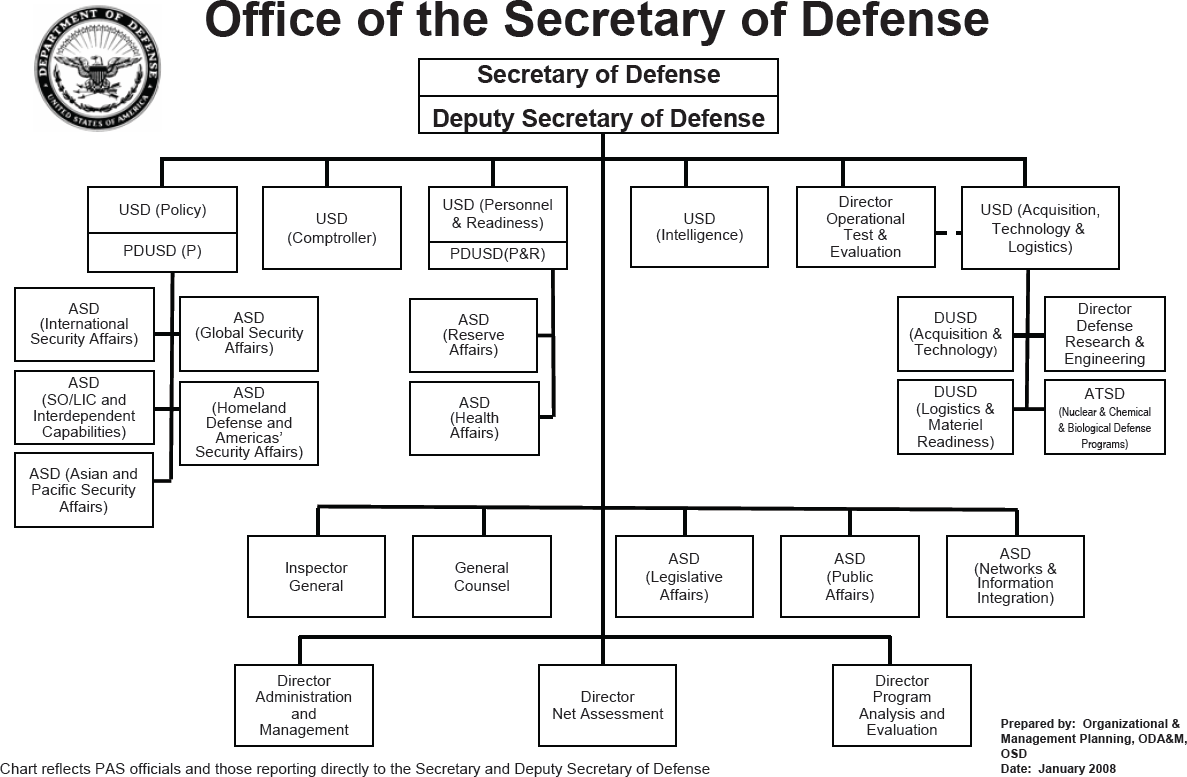
A 2008 Office of the Secretary of Defense organizational chart

The Office of the Secretary of Defense (OSD) is the secretary and their deputies, including predominantly civilian staff. OSD is the principal staff element of the Secretary of Defense in the exercise of policy development, planning, resource management, fiscal and program evaluation and oversight, and interface and exchange with other U.S. federal government departments and agencies, foreign governments, and international organizations, through formal and informal processes. OSD also performs oversight and management of the Defense Agencies, Department of Defense Field Activities, and specialized Cross Functional Teams.

==== Defense agencies ====
OSD is a parent agency of the following defense agencies:

- Armed Forces Radiobiology Research Institute
- Department of Defense Education Activity
- Defense Advanced Research Projects Agency
- Defense Commissary Agency
- Defense Contract Audit Agency
- Defense Contract Management Agency
- Defense Finance and Accounting Service
- Defense Health Agency
- Defense Information Systems Agency
- Defense Legal Services Agency
- Defense Logistics Agency
- Defense POW/MIA Accounting Agency
- Defense Security Cooperation Agency
- Defense Counterintelligence and Security Agency
- Defense Technical Information Center
- Defense Threat Reduction Agency
- Space Development Agency

==== National intelligence agencies ====
Several defense agencies are members of the United States Intelligence Community. These are national-level intelligence services that operate under the Department of Defense jurisdiction but simultaneously fall under the authorities of the Office of the Director of National Intelligence. They fulfill the requirements of national policymakers and war planners, serve as Combat Support Agencies, and also assist and deploy alongside non-Department of Defense intelligence or law enforcement services such as the Central Intelligence Agency and the Federal Bureau of Investigation. The military services each have their intelligence elements that are distinct from but subject to coordination by national intelligence agencies under the Department of Defense. Department of Defense manages the nation's coordinating authorities and assets in disciplines of signals intelligence, geospatial intelligence, and measurement and signature intelligence, and also builds, launches, and operates the Intelligence Community's satellite assets. Department of Defense also has its own human intelligence service, which contributes to the CIA's human intelligence efforts while also focusing on military human intelligence priorities. These agencies are directly overseen by the Under Secretary of Defense for Intelligence and Security.

National Intelligence Agencies under the Department of Defense

Defense Intelligence Agency

National Geospatial-Intelligence Agency

National Reconnaissance Office

National Security Agency

=== Joint Chiefs of Staff ===
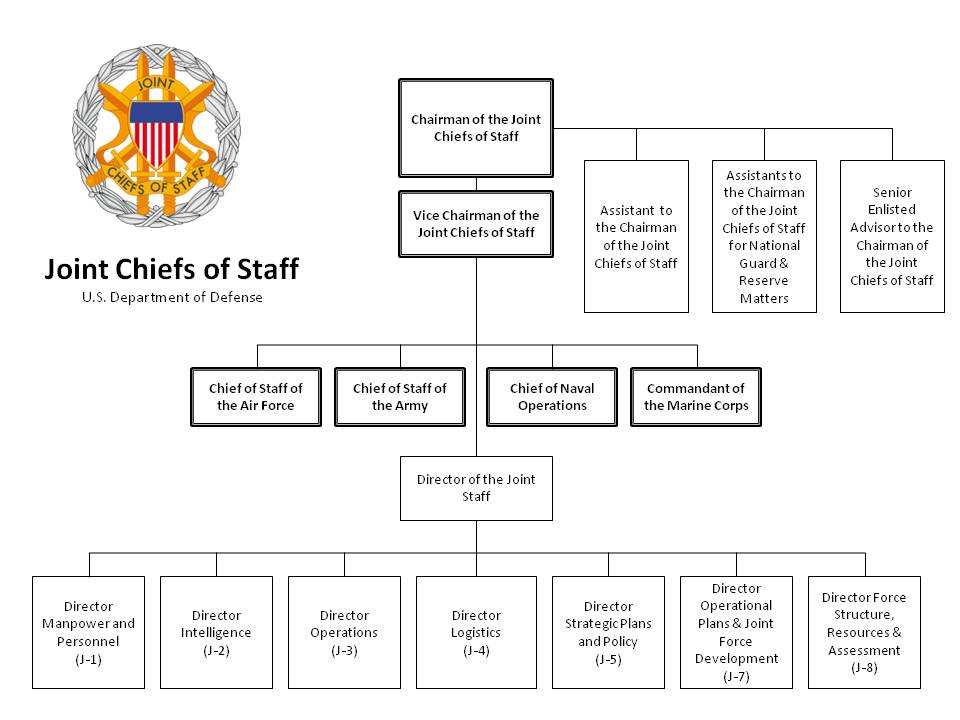
Joint Chiefs of Staff and Joint Staff organizational chart

The Joint Chiefs of Staff is a body of senior uniformed leaders in the Department of Defense who advise the secretary of defense, the Homeland Security Council, the National Security Council and the president on military matters. The composition of the Joint Chiefs of Staff is defined by statute and consists of the chairman of the Joint Chiefs of Staff, Vice Chairman of the Joint Chiefs of Staff, senior enlisted advisor to the chairman, the Military Service chiefs from the Army, Marine Corps, Navy, Air Force, and Space Force, in addition to the chief of National Guard Bureau, all appointed by the president following U.S. Senate confirmation. Each of the individual military service chiefs, outside their Joint Chiefs of Staff obligations, works directly for the secretary of the military department concerned: the secretary of the Army, secretary of the Navy, and secretary of the Air Force.

Following the Goldwater–Nichols Act in 1986, the Joint Chiefs of Staff no longer maintained operational command authority individually or collectively. The act designated the chairman of the Joint Chiefs of Staff (CJCS) as the "principal military adviser to the president, the National Security Council, the Homeland Security Council, and the Secretary of Defense". The remaining Joint Chiefs of Staff may only have their advice relayed to the president, National Security Council, the Homeland Security Council, or the secretary of defense after submitting it to the CJCS. By law, the chairman has to present that advice whenever he is presenting his own. The chain of command goes from the president to the secretary of defense to the commanders of the Combatant Commands. Goldwater–Nichols also created the office of the vice chairman, and the chairman is now designated as the principal military adviser to the secretary of defense, the Homeland Security Council, the National Security Council and to the president.

The Joint Staff is a headquarters staff at the Pentagon made up of personnel from all five services that assist the chairman and vice chairman in discharging their duties. It is managed by the director of the Joint Staff who is a lieutenant general or vice admiral.

=== Military departments and services ===
There are three military departments within the Department of Defense:

1. the Department of the Army, within which the United States Army is organized.
2. the Department of the Navy, within which the United States Navy and the United States Marine Corps are organized.
3. the Department of the Air Force, within which the United States Air Force and United States Space Force are organized.

The military departments are each headed by their secretary (i.e., Secretary of the Army, Secretary of the Navy and Secretary of the Air Force), appointed by the president, with the advice and consent of the Senate. They have the legal authority under Title 10 of the United States Code to conduct all the affairs of their respective departments within which the military services are organized. The secretaries of the military departments are (by law) subordinate to the secretary of defense and (by SecDef delegation) to the deputy secretary of defense.

Secretaries of military departments, in turn, normally exercise authority over their forces by delegation through their respective service chiefs (i.e., Chief of Staff of the Army, Commandant of the Marine Corps, Chief of Naval Operations, Chief of Staff of the Air Force, and Chief of Space Operations) over forces not assigned to a Combatant Command.

Military departments are tasked solely with "the training, provision of equipment, and administration of troops". The Defense Reorganization Act of 1958 removed the power of command over troops from secretaries of military departments and service chiefs.

Military departments of the Department of Defense

Department of the Army

Department of the Navy

Department of the Air Force
Military services of the Department of Defense

U.S. Army

U.S. Marine Corps

U.S. Navy

U.S. Air Force

U.S. Space Force

=== Unified Combatant Commands ===
A unified combatant command is a military command composed of personnel/equipment from at least two Military Departments, which has a broad, continuing mission. They are responsible for the operational command of forces. Almost all operational U.S. forces are under the authority of a Unified Command. The DoD Unified Command Plan lays out combatant commands' missions, geographical/functional responsibilities, and force structure.

During military operations, the chain of command runs from the president to the secretary of defense to the combatant commanders of the Combatant Commands.

As of 2019, the United States has eleven Combatant Commands, organized either on a geographical basis (known as "area of responsibility", AOR) or on a global, functional basis:

- U.S. Northern Command (USNORTHCOM)
- U.S. Southern Command (USSOUTHCOM)
- U.S. Central Command (USCENTCOM)
- U.S. European Command (USEUCOM)
- U.S. Pacific Command (USPACOM)
- U.S. Africa Command (USAFRICOM)
- U.S. Strategic Command (USSTRATCOM)
- U.S. Special Operations Command (USSOCOM)
- U.S. Transportation Command (USTRANSCOM)
- U.S. Cyber Command (USCYBERCOM)
- U.S. Space Command (USSPACECOM)

== Budget ==
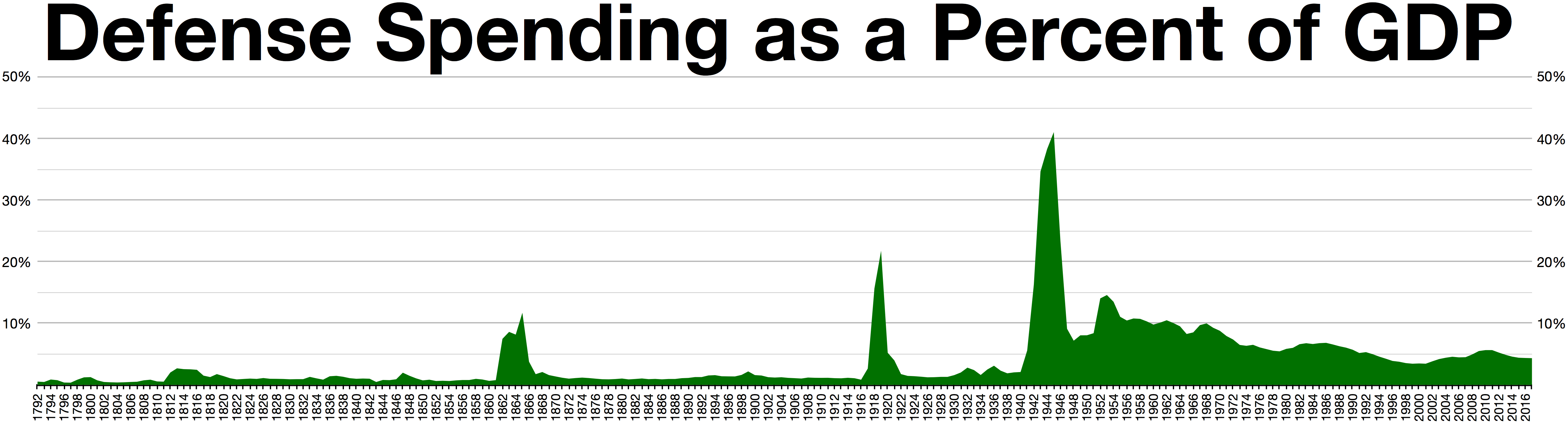
Defense spending as a percent of gross domestic product from 1792 to 2017

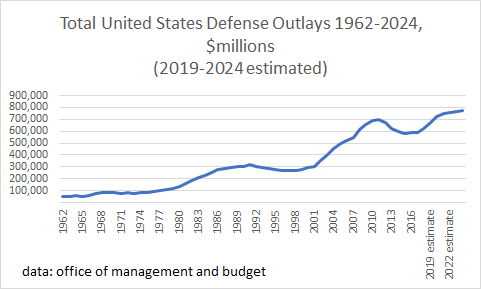
Total United States Defense outlays from 1962 to 2024 in $millions (2019 to 2024 are estimated)

Department of Defense spending in 2017 was 3.15% of GDP and accounted for about 38% of the budgeted global military spending – more than the next seven largest militaries combined. By 2019, the 27th secretary of defense had begun a line-by-line review of the defense budget; in 2020 the secretary identified items amounting to $5.7 billion, out of a $106 billion subtotal (the so-called "fourth estate" agencies such as missile defense, and defense intelligence, amounting to 16% of the defense budget), He will re-deploy to the modernization of hypersonics, artificial intelligence, and missile defense. Beyond 2021 the 27th secretary of defense is projecting the need for yearly budget increases of 3 to 5 percent to modernize.

The Department of Defense accounts for the majority of federal discretionary spending. In FY2017 (U.S. fiscal year 2017), the Department of Defense budgeted spending accounted for 15% of the U.S. federal budget, and 49% of federal discretionary spending, which represents funds not accounted for by pre-existing obligations. However, this does not include many military-related expenses that fall outside the Department of Defense budget, such as nuclear weapons research, production, maintenance, and cleanup, which are covered in the Department of Energy budget; Veterans Affairs expenses; payments from the Treasury Department for military retirees, widows, and their families; interest on debts incurred from past wars; or State Department financing for foreign arms sales and military-related development assistance. Additionally, it does not account for defense spending outside of military operations, including expenditures by the Department of Homeland Security, counter-terrorism funding by the FBI, and intelligence-gathering spending by the NSA.

In the 2010 United States federal budget, the Department of Defense was allocated a base budget of $533.7 billion, with a further $75.5 billion adjustment in respect of 2009, and $130 billion for overseas contingencies. The subsequent 2010 Department of Defense Financial Report shows the total budgetary resources for FY2010 were $1.2 trillion. Of these resources, $1.1 trillion were obligated and $994 billion were disbursed, with the remaining resources relating to multi-year modernization projects requiring additional time to procure. After over a decade of non-compliance, as part of the National Defense Authorization Act for Fiscal Year 2010, Congress established a deadline of FY2017 for the Department of Defense to achieve audit readiness, although this did not end up occurring.

In 2015 the allocation for the Department of Defense was $585 billion, the highest level of budgetary resources among all federal agencies, and this amounts to more than one-half of the annual federal expenditures in the United States federal budget discretionary budget.

On 28 September 2018, President Donald Trump signed the Department of Defense and Labor, Health and Human Services, and Education Appropriations Act, 2019, and Continuing Appropriations Act, 2019 (H.R.6157) into law. On 30 September 2018, the FY2018 Budget expired and the FY2019 budget came into effect.

=== FY2019 ===
The FY2019 Budget for the Department of Defense is approximately $686,074,048,000 (including Base + Overseas Contingency Operations + Emergency Funds) in discretionary spending and $8,992,000,000 in mandatory spending totaling $695,066,000,000.

Undersecretary of Defense (Comptroller) David L. Norquist said in a hearing regarding the FY 2019 budget: "The overall number you often hear is $716 billion. That is the amount of funding for national defense, the accounting code is 050 and includes more than simply the Department of Defense. It includes, for example, the Department of Energy and others. That large a number, if you back out the $30 billion for non-defense agencies, you get to $686 billion. That is the funding for the Department of Defense, split between $617 billion in base and $69 billion in overseas contingency".

The Department of Defense budget encompasses the majority of the National Defense Budget of approximately $716.0 billion in discretionary spending and $10.8 billion in mandatory spending for a $726.8 billion total. Of the total, $708.1 billion falls under the jurisdiction of the House Committee on Armed Services and Senate Armed Services Committee and is subject to authorization by the annual National Defense Authorization Act (NDAA). The remaining $7.9 billion falls under the jurisdiction of other congressional committees.

The Department of Defense is unique because it is one of the few federal entities where the majority of its funding falls into the discretionary category. The majority of the entire federal budget is mandatory, and much of the discretionary funding in the budget consists of DoD dollars.

==== Budget overview ====
DoD base + OCO + Emergency budget by appropriation title
Title	FY 2019 ($ in thousands)*
Military personnel	$152,883,052
Operation and maintenance	$283,544,068
Procurement	$144,340,905
RDT&E	$92,364,681
Revolving and management funds	$1,557,305
Defense bill	$674,690,011
Military construction	$9,801,405
Family housing	$1,582,632
Military construction bill	$11,384,037
Total	$686,074,048

* Numbers may not add due to rounding

=== FY2024 ===
As of 10 March 2023 the FY2024 presidential budget request was $842 billion. (Note: The Senate agreed to the debt ceiling arrangement for 2023–2025 on 2 June 2023.) In January 2023, Treasury Secretary Janet Yellen announced that the U.S. government would hit its $31.4 trillion debt ceiling on 19 January 2023; the date on which the U.S. government would no longer be able to use extraordinary measures such as issuance of Treasury securities is estimated to be in June 2023. On 3 June 2023, the debt ceiling was suspended until 2025. The $886 billion National Defense Authorization Act is facing reconciliation of the House and Senate bills after passing both houses 27 July 2023; the conferees have to be chosen, next. As of September 2023, a continuing resolution was needed to prevent a government shutdown. A shutdown was avoided on 30 September for 45 days (until 17 November 2023), with passage of the NDAA on 14 December 2023. The Senate will next undertake negotiations on supplemental spending for 2024. A government shutdown was averted on 23 March 2024 with the signing of a $1.2 trillion bill to cover FY2024.

=== Criticism of finances ===
A 2013 Reuters investigation concluded that Defense Finance and Accounting Service, the primary financial management arm of the Department of Defense, implements monthly "unsubstantiated change actions"—illegal, inaccurate "plugs"—that forcibly make DoD's books match Treasury's books. Reuters reported that the Pentagon was the only federal agency that had not released annual audits as required by a 1992 law. According to Reuters, the Pentagon "annually reports to Congress that its books are in such disarray that an audit is impossible".

In 2015, a Pentagon consulting firm performed an audit on the department's budget. It found that there was $125 billion in wasteful spending that could be saved over the next five years without layoffs or reduction in military personnel. In 2016, The Washington Post uncovered that rather than taking the advice of the auditing firm, senior defense officials suppressed and hid the report from the public to avoid political scrutiny. In June 2016, the Office of the Inspector General released a report stating that the Army made $6.5 trillion in wrongful adjustments to its accounting entries in 2015. The Department of Defense failed its fifth audit in 2022, and could not account for more than 60% of its $3.5 trillion in assets.

In the latest Center for Effective Government analysis of 15 federal agencies which receive the most Freedom of Information Act requests, published in 2015 (using 2012 and 2013 data, the most recent years available), the DoD earned 61 out of a possible 100 points, a D− grade. While it had improved from a failing grade in 2013, it still had low scores in processing requests (55%) and disclosure rules (42%).

== Related legislation ==
The organization and functions of the Department of Defense are in Title 10 of the United States Code.

Other significant legislation related to the Department of Defense includes:

- 1947: National Security Act of 1947
- 1958: Department of Defense Reorganization Act, Pub. L. 85–599
- 1963: Department of Defense Appropriations Act, Pub. L. 88–149
- 1963: Military Construction Authorization Act, Pub. L. 88–174
- 1967: Supplemental Defense Appropriations Act, Pub. L. 90–8
- 1984: Department of Defense Authorization Act, Pub. L. 98–525
- 1986: Goldwater–Nichols Act of 1986 (Department of Defense Reorganization Act), Pub. L. 99–433
- 1996: Antiterrorism and Effective Death Penalty Act, Pub. L. 104–132 (text) (PDF)

== See also ==
- Arms industry – Industrial sector which manufactures weapons and military technology and equipment
- Energy usage of the United States military
- Global Command and Control System – U.S. military decision support system
- JADE (planning system) – U.S. military system used for planning
- List of United States defense contractors
- List of United States military bases
- Military–industrial complex – Concept in military and political science
- Private military company – Company providing armed combat or security services
- Title 32 of the Code of Federal Regulations – Rules regarding U.S. national defense
- United States Department of Justice
- United States Department of Veterans Affairs
- Warrior Games – American sporting event for wounded service personnel and veterans
- Military budget of the United States
