= Philippine energy law =

Philippine energy law is a Philippine law that concerns energy, both fossil fuels and renewable energy. As one of the fastest-growing nations in Asia, with over 80 million residents, energy law in the Philippines is important.

Researching Philippine law is somewhat complicated; all laws are numbered sequentially, not by topic or year, and consist of statutes, presidential decrees, other regulations, and case law. Nonetheless, private entities have organized the law into readily accessible formats.

== Utility laws ==
The earliest Philippine energy law dates from 1903 during the American Commonwealth, Act No. 667, which concerns franchises for utilities, and Act No. 1022, which allowed such to have mortgages. A uniform law in 1929 established a model act for establishing new utilities.

== Fossil fuel laws ==
The first coal mining law, Act No. 2719, known as the Coal Land Act, dates back to 1917.

Oil exploration was allowed by Act No. 2932 of 1920.

An older law, Act. No. 4243, was repealed by The Mining Act, Commonwealth Act No. 137 in 1936, as amended several times by acts and decrees.

== Renewable energy laws ==
The first hydroelectric power law dates from 1933, Act No. 4062. Commonwealth Act No. 120 of 1936 created the National Power Corporation, and was amended several times through 1967.

A subsequent law, Republic Act 9513, known as the Renewable Energy Law, which encourages the development and use of non-traditional energy sources, has since come into being.

== See also ==
- Energy law
- Philippine Economic History, 1973-1986
- Wind power in the Philippines
