= Industrial Assessment Center =

- Seal of the Department of Energy

Agency overview
- Formed: 1976
- Preceding agency: Energy Analysis and Diagnostic Center
- Headquarters: Piscataway, New Jersey
- Website: iac.university

There are 31 Industrial Assessment Centers in the United States as of June 2021. These centers are located at universities across the US, and are funded by the United States Department of Energy (DOE) to spread ideas relating to industrial energy conservation.

The centers conduct research into energy conservation techniques for industrial applications. This is accomplished by performing energy audits or assessments at manufacturers near the particular center. The IAC program has achieved over $890 million of implemented and $2.6 billion of recommended energy cost savings since its inception.

== History ==
Industrial Assessment Centers (formerly called the Energy Analysis and Diagnostic Center (EADC) program) were created by the Department of Commerce in 1976 and later moved to the DOE. The IAC program is administered through the Advanced Manufacturing Office under the Office of Energy Efficiency and Renewable Energy. The Centers were created to help small and medium-sized manufacturing facilities cut back on unnecessary costs from inefficient energy use, ineffective production procedures, excess waste production, and other production-related problems. According to instructions from DOE, currently the centers are only required to focus on reducing wasted energy and increasing energy efficiency. While this remains the primary focus of the assessments, waste reduction and productivity improvements are still commonly recommended.

== Other Benefits ==
In addition to providing technical support to small to mid-sized manufacturers through energy assessments, the IAC program offers several other important benefits. Apart from the routine energy audits which cover a broad scope of industrial settings and subsystems, the IACs provide technical material and workshops promoting energy efficiency.

IAC Database
Rutgers University maintains a large databases of energy efficiency projects in the industrial sector. The database contains recommendations from every audit completed by an IAC dating back to 1980. As of June 2021, the IAC program had finished 19,470 assessments and made over 146,500 recommendations. This database is free and open to the public.

IAC Alumni
The IAC program helps train the next generation of energy efficiency engineers. Hundreds of students participate in the program each year, and over 56% of those students pursue careers in energy or energy efficiency.

== Participating Universities ==
- Arizona State University
- Boise State University
- Case Western Reserve University
- Clemson University
- Colorado State University
- Georgia Institute of Technology
- Indiana University – Purdue University Indianapolis
- Lehigh University
- Louisiana State University
- Michigan State University
- North Carolina State
- Oklahoma State University
- Oregon State University
- San Diego State University
- San Francisco State University
- San Jose State University
- Syracuse University
- Tennessee Technological University
- Texas A&M University
- University of Alabama
- University of Connecticut
- University of Dayton
- University of Delaware
- University of Florida
- University of Illinois, Chicago
- University of Kentucky
- University of Massachusetts Amherst
- University of Miami
- University of Missouri
- University of Nebraska-Lincoln
- University of Texas Rio Grande Valley
- University of Utah
- University of Washington
- University of Wisconsin, Milwaukee
- West Virginia University
