= Unmanned Combat Armed Rotorcraft =

The Unmanned Combat Armed Rotorcraft or UCAR was a program carried out by DARPA and the United States Army in 2002–2004 to develop an unmanned combat helicopter. It was cancelled in December 2004 due to a shift of Army funding priorities.

== Development ==
Originally named the "Robotic Rotary Wingman", a requirement was issued in the spring of 2002, specifying a robot rotorcraft to be armed with missiles, unguided rockets, guns, and nonlethal directed energy weapons, and with the capability of attacking masked targets. The UCAR was to cost $4 million to US$8 million, and have operating costs 10% to 40% of those of an AH-64 Apache. Operational cost reductions were expected to be achieved at least in part by reducing the number of personnel required to maintain and operate the machine.

=== Design bids ===
Contenders for the UCAR contract included Lockheed Martin, Boeing, Northrop Grumman, and Sikorsky. Boeing teamed up with companies like Axiom, BAE Systems, and Rockwell Scientific to refine and develop its UCAR design.

Two finalists, Northrop Grumman and Lockheed Martin were selected in the summer of 2003 to come up with a detailed design; ironically, neither company had ever built a full-production rotorcraft. The Northrop Grumman design used the twin-two-blade-rotor "eggbeater" scheme usually associated with Kaman helicopters – in fact Kaman has teamed with Northop Grumman on the project – while the Lockheed Martin design used a four-blade rotor with a "no-tail-rotor (NOTAR)" jet exhaust in the tail to cancel torque.

Both were "stealthy" designs with weapon stores in internal bays; both eliminated the tail rotor, which is the noisiest element on a conventional helicopter. The Northrop Grumman eggbeater was to be able to fly at more than 295 km/h (160 knots) and at an altitude of up to 6,100 meters (20,000 feet), with an endurance with auxiliary fuel tanks of 10 hours and a range of up to 2,000 kilometers (1,200 mi). Northrop Grumman envisioned two variants: an attack variant, the baseline version, optimized for low-altitude operation and carrying a nav-attack sensor suite; and a scout variant, optimized for high-altitude operation and carrying a SAR payload and communications relay. The Lockheed Martin proposal provided similar performance but less endurance; the baseline payload configuration included a SAR.

A single contractor was to be selected by 2004 to develop two X-vehicle prototypes. It was to lead to a "B-model", closer to an operational machine, with a warload of from 225 to 450 kilograms (496 to 992 lb), including nonlethal directed-energy weapons.{{

The "A-model" was to fly in 2006, followed by a “B-model” fieldable prototype in 2008, and finally a transition to an Army acquisition program by 2010.

== Outcome ==
The Army seemed very enthusiastic about the program, but then pulled in December 2004, citing more immediate demands on aviation funding. DARPA searched around for another service sponsor, was unable to find one, and axed the procurement of the demonstrators at the end of the year.

== Sources ==
=== Citations ===
This article contains material that originally came from the web article Unmanned Aerial Vehicles by Greg Goebel, which exists in the Public Domain.
