= Real estate benchmarking =

Analysis standard for investment property

Real estate benchmarking is the standard of measurement used to analyze the financial characteristics of a real estate investment property. In the general sense, real estate benchmarking refers to the comparison of potential real estate investment properties against a predetermined framework of measurement. In a narrow sense, the term real estate benchmarking refers to the specific real estate indicators used to measure the real estate properties.

The individual indicators are referred to as key performance indicators, or KPI for short. Examples include the net cash flow, total rental incomes, or the internal rate of return.

== Overview ==
Real estate benchmarking consists of a group of real estate financial indicators and their benchmarks. Indicators in general allow investors to remove emotions and speculation out of investing; this is true not just in real estate investing, but on any other investment types such as stock or currency trading. Indicators are particularly important in real estate since it deals with a physical entity- a bricks and mortar structure, which might trigger emotions on the investor based on its architecture and beauty.

The process starts by setting benchmarks for each indicator based on their accept/reject criteria; which subsequently are used to compare the desirability of the real estate properties; thus providing context and point of reference on the properties' financial characteristics and profitability standing.

== Types of real estate benchmarking indicators ==
There are many real estate financial indicators, however the ones that provide the most value for benchmarking (especially for income producing real estate investments) are:

- Gross rent multiplier: Calculates the market value of the property.
- Cash on cash return: Measures the return on cash invested.
- Profitability index: Measures the cost-benefit for the property investment.
- Internal rate of return: Assesses the financial efficiency and desirability of the investment property.
- Debt coverage ratio: Finds out whether the property generates enough money to cover the debt.
- Cash break even ratio: Estimates how vulnerable a property is to defaulting on its debt should rental income decline.
- Loan-to-value ratio: Calculates the ratio between the loan balance and the market value of a property expressed as a percentage.
- Capitalization rate: Measures the earning ability of an income-producing property.
- Net cash flow: Calculates the net cash flow of the property after expenses.

== Real estate indicator benchmarks ==
The accept/reject benchmark value for each indicator varies from investor to investor, investors adjust the accept/reject benchmark values according to risk tolerance levels and investment goals.

The following table provides a point of reference about typical accept/reject benchmarking settings for each indicator.

Benchmarking indicator	Example accept criteria	Example reject criteria	Note
Gross rent multiplier	Less than 9	Greater or equal 9	The lower the better
Cash on cash return	Greater or equal 10%	Less than 10%	The higher the better
Profitability index	Greater or equal 1.0	Less than 1.0	The higher the better
Internal rate of return	Greater or equal 10%	Less than 10%	The higher the better
Debt coverage ratio	Greater or equal 1.2	Less than 1.2	The higher the better
Break even ratio	Less than or equal 85%	Greater than 85%	The lower the better
Loan to value ratio	Less than or equal 70%	Greater than 70%	The lower the better
Capitalization rate	Greater or equal 7%	Less than 7%	The higher the better
Net cash flow	Greater or equal 10%	Less than 10%	The higher the better

There exist no standard set of accept/reject criteria for the benchmarking indicators, each investor needs to make the determination on which criterion is appropriate for each particular situation.

== See also ==
- German income approach
- International Property Measurement Standards
- Investment rating for real estate
- Real estate appraisal
