= Rental value =

Market value of property while rented or leased

Rental value is the fair market value of property while rented out in a lease. More generally, it may be the consideration paid under the lease for the right to occupy, or the royalties or return received by a lessor (landlord) under a license to real property. In the science and art of appraisal, it is the amount that would be paid for rental of similar real property in the same condition and in the same area.

== Other definitions ==
In economic terms, the rental value is the added value an individual contributes when goods are being exchanged or traded for profit. This additional quality is often fixed and is alone under the trader’s ownership. The characteristic can be tangible such as a signature method of use or intangible such as exclusive knowledge pertaining to a product; also known as intellectual property. The value arises from when the market or model is in equilibrium and it is advantages for an individual to take part in trading activities rather than not participate, considering profit or utility can be achieved. Two separate but ideally identical exchange scenarios may occur but may have completely different values calculated. This is explained by two classic examples, a consumer achieves a surplus or profit when buying goods if they are able to buy all quantities at a single price. The producer lacks knowledge concerning the relationship between an individual’s willingness-to-pay and quantity. This means the producer cannot price discriminate according to the consumer’s demand marginality. In this example the buyer has achieved a beneficial rent. If the seller were to discover the buyers willingness-to-pay at different quantities, the seller could maximize their profit by selling quantities at different prices. In most situations this is achieved by slightly lowering the price as more products are bought. In this example the seller achieves a beneficial rent. Economic theories suggest that a free market would correct itself of rents. Considering the producer surplus example, if the gradual discounting of prices also attracted more consumers, the producer would have to re-evaluate their strategy. Often, consumers have different willingness’-to-pay for goods. Following this assumption, profit would not be maximized because the price strategy would not be applicable to all buyers. However, if analyzed in reality, through means such as market research, the producer can find a willingness-to-pay that represents most buyers. Consumer rent from the individuals who still pay for goods lower than willing and the producer rent from ability to price discriminate would then counter one another, resulting in market equilibrium.

In a contract lawsuit, the lessor could collect the rental value of the premises from the saloon lessee (tenant) who had violated a lease. Usable value is not the same as rental value, but is equivalent, and has been used in a condemnation proceeding.

Rental value can also be used in a divorce, separation, or annulment action for equitable distribution, in those states lacking Community property laws.

== Fair market rent in the US ==
Median cost of rent for a 1 bedroom by County

Fair market rent in the US context is the amount of money that a given property would command, if it were open for leasing at the moment.

Fair market rent is an important concept both in the Housing and Urban Development's ability to determine how much of the rent is covered by the government for those tenants who are part of Section 8, as well as by other governmental institutions.

Fair market rent is sometimes used by appraisal districts to determine tax rates.

U.S. HUD's Office of Policy Development and Research (PD&R) publishes Fair Market Rents and Income Limits (respectively, the basis for how much program administrators will subsidize housing units, and the maximum incomes that tenants may not exceed in order to qualify for subsidized housing) on an annual basis. These figures vary throughout the country based on a number of determining factors, such as local economic conditions and housing demand.

== See also ==
- Economic rent
- Capitalization rate
- Fair market value
- Gross output
- Gross rent multiplier
- Imputed rent
- Mesne profits
- Minimum lease payments
- Operating surplus
- Present value
- Real estate appraisal
