= Decline porn =

Online content depicting urban decay

Decline porn is an Internet phenomenon and genre of multimedia content shared on social media depicting Western metropolises—such as London, Manchester, New York City, or San Francisco—as areas suffering from severe urban and civilizational collapse. The content typically focuses on crime, substance abuse, litter, and immigration, frequently blaming immigrants or political negligence for the situation. Beyond using selectively edited footage of street crime, vandalism, or homelessness taken out of context, creators extensively utilize manipulative techniques, including generative artificial intelligence and deepfakes, to spread these narratives.

== Methods ==
Decline porn content is produced both by individual vloggers and influencers and by anonymous accounts aiming to maximize viewership and monetization on platforms such as TikTok, Instagram, and Facebook. A primary technique is using advanced artificial intelligence tools to alter video thumbnails or the videos themselves to artificially heighten dramatic effect. For example, South African YouTuber Kurt Caz processed footage of a passing cyclist in London through an AI editor to place a black balaclava on him and replaced English restaurant signs in the background with pseudo-Arabic characters, despite the original video showing ordinary English signs on a street in Croydon and a friendly interaction with the cyclist.

In addition to editing real footage, creators generate entirely fictional scenes using AI to portray absurd depictions of urban decay. A British creator operating under the handle RadialB posted a series of videos falsely claiming to show a taxpayer-funded water park, zoo, and aquarium in Croydon, despite never having visited the borough. These deepfake clips depicted groups of predominantly Black youths in balaclavas and puffer jackets (referred to by the creator as "roadmen") sliding into dirty, trash-filled pools. Other AI-generated clips showed these figures fictitiously debating in the British Parliament, with one video receiving eight million views in a single day. The creator's TikTok account was subsequently banned. He defended his actions as shock humor intended to exploit recommendation algorithms for views, denying any political motivation.

Another major strategy involves deliberately inciting street conflicts, often framed as "auditing". Creators intentionally thrust cameras into the faces of pedestrians to provoke aggressive or defensive reactions, which are then presented as evidence of a dangerous urban environment. In extreme cases, such as with vlogger Tyler Oliveira, creators intentionally provoke violent clashes with the assistance of hired bodyguards, selling edited and uncensored versions of these confrontations on paid platforms.

== Social context and reception ==
Commentators have described the decline porn genre as travelogues for people who do not want to travel, serving primarily to reinforce xenophobic assumptions about foreign places and racial minorities. Critics point out that creators often ignore local demographic history when discussing the ethnic makeup of neighborhoods. For instance, a video by the channel Two Mad Explorers filmed in Whitechapel, London, framed the presence of the Bangladeshi community and Bengali signage as evidence of Britain's imminent collapse, ignoring that the community has legally resided there since the 1940s through Commonwealth ties, and that the area's first Indian restaurant opened in 1939. Sociological analyses view these digital caricatures of urban lower classes as a modern adaptation of the early 21st-century British "chav" stereotype, scaled up digitally for public ridicule and stigmatization.

Exaggerated and fabricated narratives of urban collapse have been amplified by prominent public figures, such as Elon Musk, who has repeatedly posted on X warning of the destruction of Britain due to mass migration and attended an event organized by far-right activist Tommy Robinson. Manipulated content online frequently sparks intense political reactions, outrage, and racist commentary.

According to a YouGov public opinion poll from January 2026, while a majority of the British public believed London was unsafe, only a third of London residents agreed, and 81% of Londoners felt safe in their own neighborhoods. Local residents in targeted areas, such as Croydon-based Black content creator C.Tino, have spoken out against the trend, arguing that it distorts reality and creates a false impression of their neighborhoods as dangerous ghettos.

== See also ==
- Deepfake
- Disinformation
- No-go zone
- Ruin porn
- Urban decay
