= Property investment calculator =

Property investment calculator is a term used to define an application that provides fundamental financial analysis underpinning the purchase, ownership, management, rental and/or sale of real estate for profit. Property investment calculators are typically driven by mathematical finance models and converted into source code. Key concepts that drive property investment calculators include returns, cash flow, affordability of financing, investment strategy, equity and risk management.

== History ==
In response to 2007 subprime mortgage crisis and preceding US property bubble, a number of residential property investment analysis tools and applications were launched to the public by both government, commercial organisations and as part of open source projects. These analytical tools were developed to help real estate investors to understand the risk and returns of residential property investing. These included mortgage calculator, residential property depreciation calculators and property investment calculators. A number of web technology companies have also developed comprehensive all-in-one packages that provide financing, risk and return analysis, investment strategy and portfolio management capabilities.

== Calculations ==
Typical calculations available from a property investment calculator:

1. Cash on cash return – Cash flow in year 1 divided by cash invested in the property.
2. Equity build up rate – Increase in equity in year 1 from mortgage principal payments divided by cash invested in the property.
3. Capitalization rate – Net operating income (NOI) divided by property's asset value.
4. Gross rent multiplier – The ratio between a rental property's gross scheduled income and its market value.
5. Net cash flows – The amount of cash to expect to receive after expenses.
6. Net present value of future cash flows – The sum of net future cash flows discounted back to the present value using the time value of money to understand what future cash flows are worth today.
7. Gross rental income – The total rental income one expects to receive.
8. Operating expenses – All expenses associated with operating the property. These can include homeowner's insurance, property taxes, and maintenance expenses to name a few.
9. Net operating income (NOI) – Net operating income is also known as net income and is income received after subtracting all operating expenses. This will exclude income taxes and interest.
10. Depreciation – The expense associated with the depreciation of your property. For more information on depreciation, see IRS Publication 946.
11. Tax savings from depreciation – The amount of taxes saved from using depreciation as an expense against income.
12. Debt to assets ratio – The ratio of debt remaining on the property to the value of the property or asset.
13. Internal rate of return – Technically speaking, it is the discount rate at which the net present value of future cash flows equals $0. In laymen terms, it is the rate of return received on investment in a given year adjusting for the time value of money.

== Types ==
1. House flipping calculator
2. Rental property calculator
3. Investment property calculator

== See also ==
- Flipping
- Internal rate of return
- Investment rating for real estate
- Off plan property
- Real-estate developer
- Wholesaling
