= NGZ =

NGZ can refer to:

- National Gallery of Zimbabwe, a gallery in Harare, Zimbabwe
- Naval Air Station Alameda, a former United States Navy air station in California (FAA identifier: NGZ)
- Neuß-Grevenbroicher Zeitung, a regional edition of the German newspaper Rheinische Post
- North Gaza Governorate, a governate of the State of Palestine (ISO 3166-2: NGZ)
- Central Teke language, a language spoken in the Republic of Congo and Democratic Republic of the Congo (ISO 639-3: ngz)

== See also ==
- Ninja Gaiden Z, a video game
- No-go zone
