= Real estate investing =

Buying and selling real estate for profit

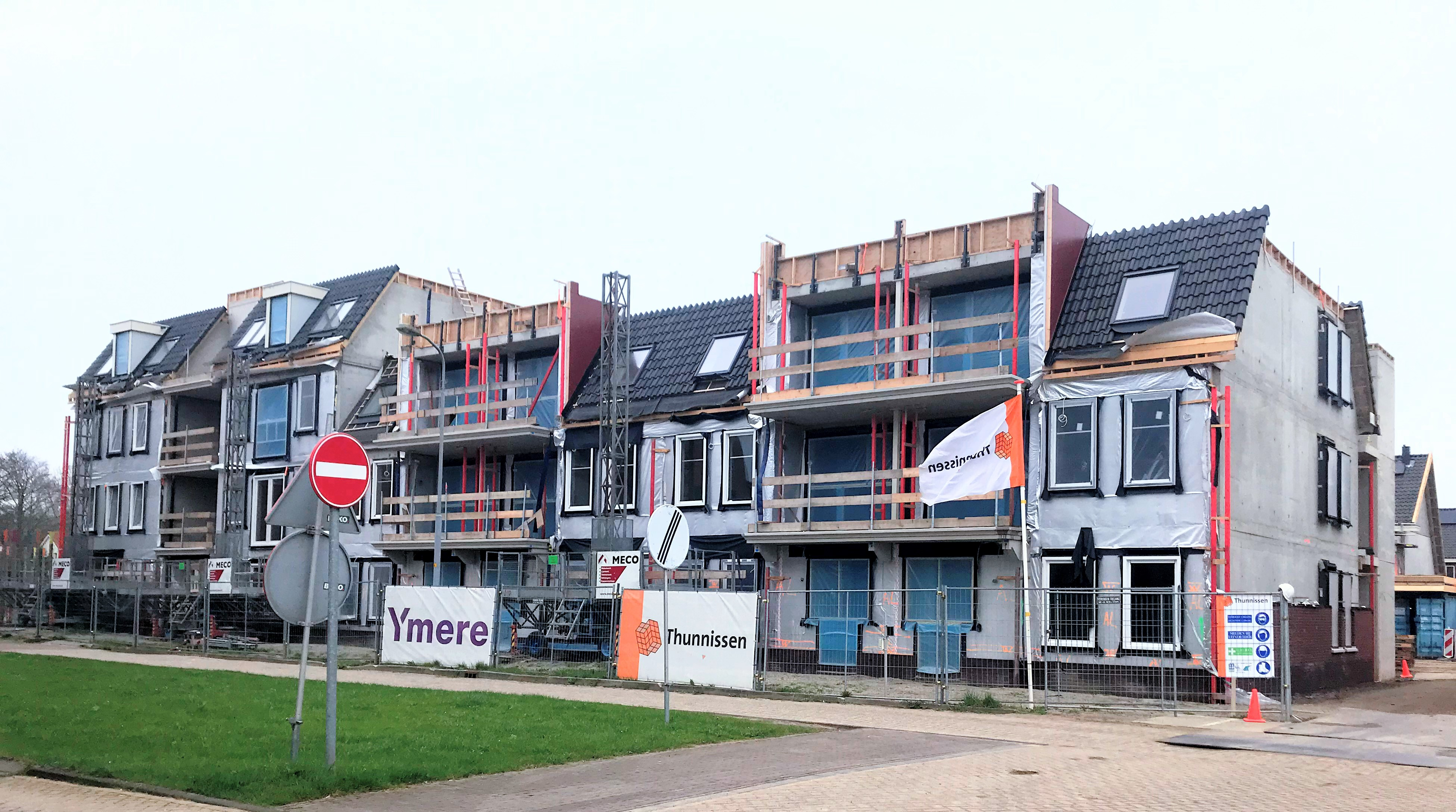
Real estate makes up the largest asset class in the world. Much larger than bonds and stocks, which respectively rank second and third by total market cap.

Real estate investing involves purchasing, owning, managing, renting, or selling real estate to generate profit or long-term wealth. A real estate investor or entrepreneur may participate actively or passively in real estate transactions. The primary goal of real estate investing is to increase value or generate a profit through strategic decision-making and market analysis. Investors analyze real estate projects by identifying property types, as each type requires a unique investment strategy. Valuation is a critical factor in assessing real estate investments, as it determines a property's true worth, guiding investors in purchases, sales, financing, and risk management. Accurate valuation helps investors avoid overpaying for assets, maximize returns, and minimize financial risk. Additionally, proper valuation plays a crucial role in securing financing, as lenders use valuations to determine loan amounts and interest rates.

Financing is fundamental to real estate investing, as investors rely on a combination of debt and equity to fund transactions. The capital stack represents the hierarchy of financing sources in a real estate investment, with debt issuers taking on lower risk in exchange for fixed interest income, while equity investors assume greater risk to participate in the upside potential of a property. Investors seek to improve net operating income (NOI) by increasing revenues or reducing operating expenses to enhance profitability.

At the end of 2024, global real estate was valued at $393.3 trillion
1. Europe 26 (25.5%)
2. North America 25 (24.5%)
3. China 24 (23.5%)
4. Asia Pacific 18 (17.6%)
5. Latin America 5 (4.90%)
6. Middle East 3 (2.94%)
7. Africa 1 (0.98%)

The success of a real estate investment depends on factors such as market conditions, property management, financial structuring, and risk assessment. Understanding the deal cycle, valuation techniques, and capital stack enables investors to make informed decisions and optimize their investment returns across different property types.

In contrast, real estate development focuses on building, improving, or renovating properties.

== History ==
During the 1980s, real estate investment funds became increasingly involved in international real estate development. This shift led to real estate becoming a global asset class. Investing in real estate in foreign countries often requires specialized knowledge of the real estate market in that country. As international real estate investment became increasingly common in the early 21st century, the availability and quality of information regarding international real estate markets increased. Real estate is one of the primary areas of investment in China, where an estimated 70% of household wealth is invested in real estate.

On September 14, 1960, President Dwight D. Eisenhower signed legislation establishing a new framework for income-producing real estate investment, merging the advantages of real estate ownership with those of stock-based investments.

This legislation introduced Real Estate Investment Trusts (REITs), allowing everyday Americans to access the benefits of commercial real estate investment, which had previously been limited to large financial institutions and wealthy individuals. The Modern REIT Era was further shaped by the Tax Reform Act of 1986, which granted REITs the ability to actively operate and manage real estate assets, rather than solely owning or financing them.

Since then, the U.S. REIT approach has become a successful and advanced framework which serves as the model for around 40 countries around the world. The EPRA index was launched in 2001.

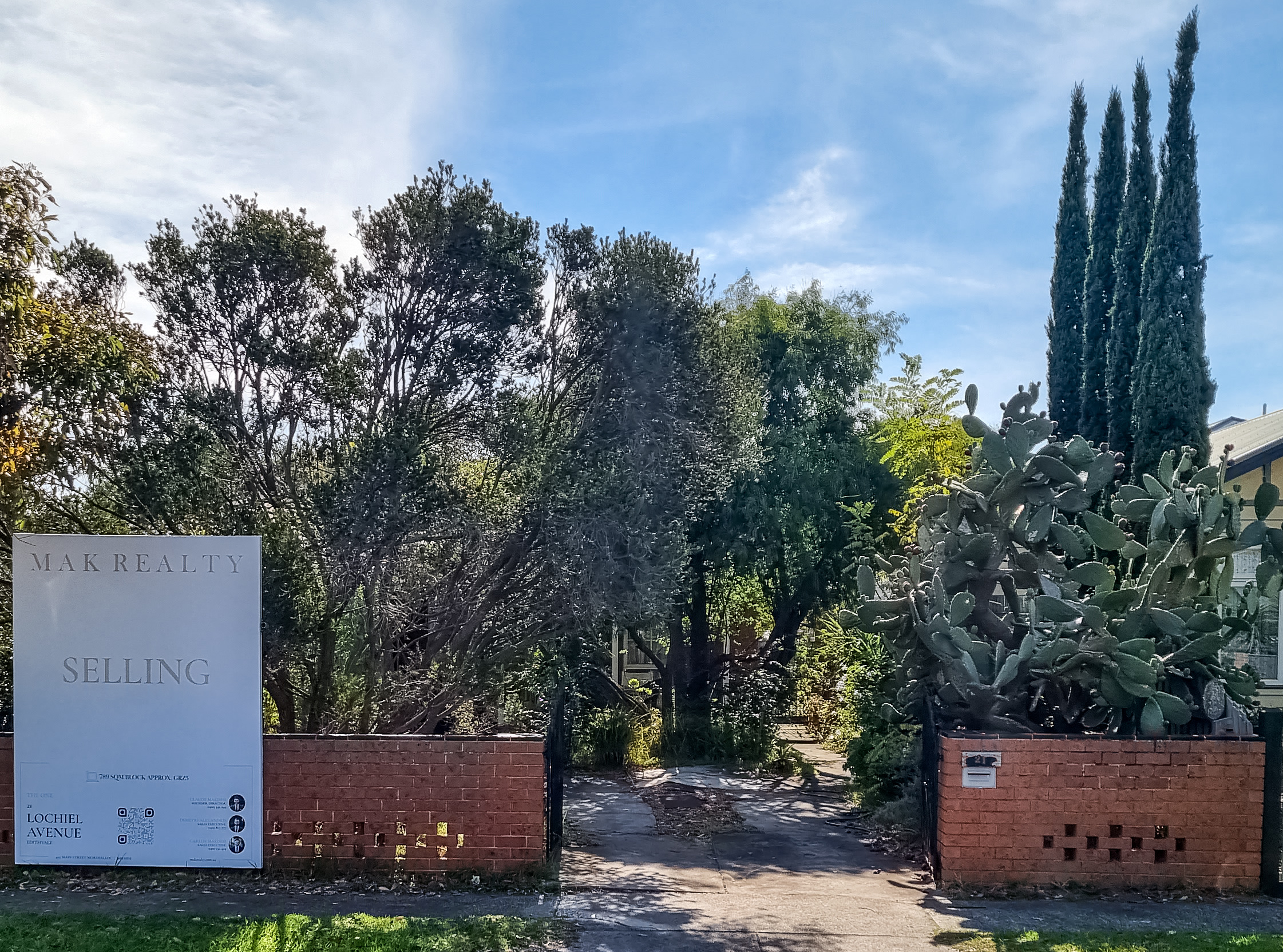
Property for Sale in Victoria, Australia Sign (left)

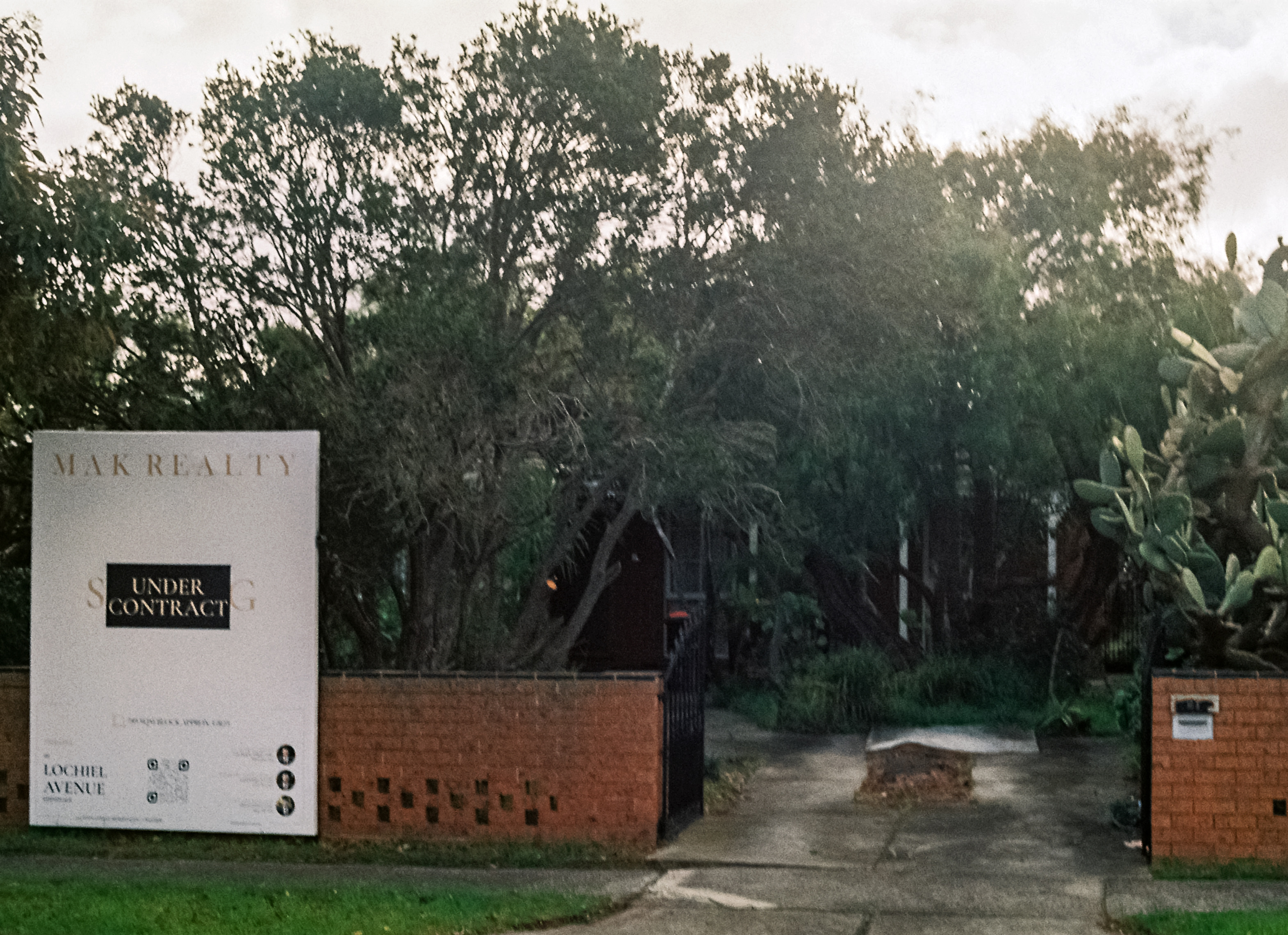
The Property at the stage of being under contract

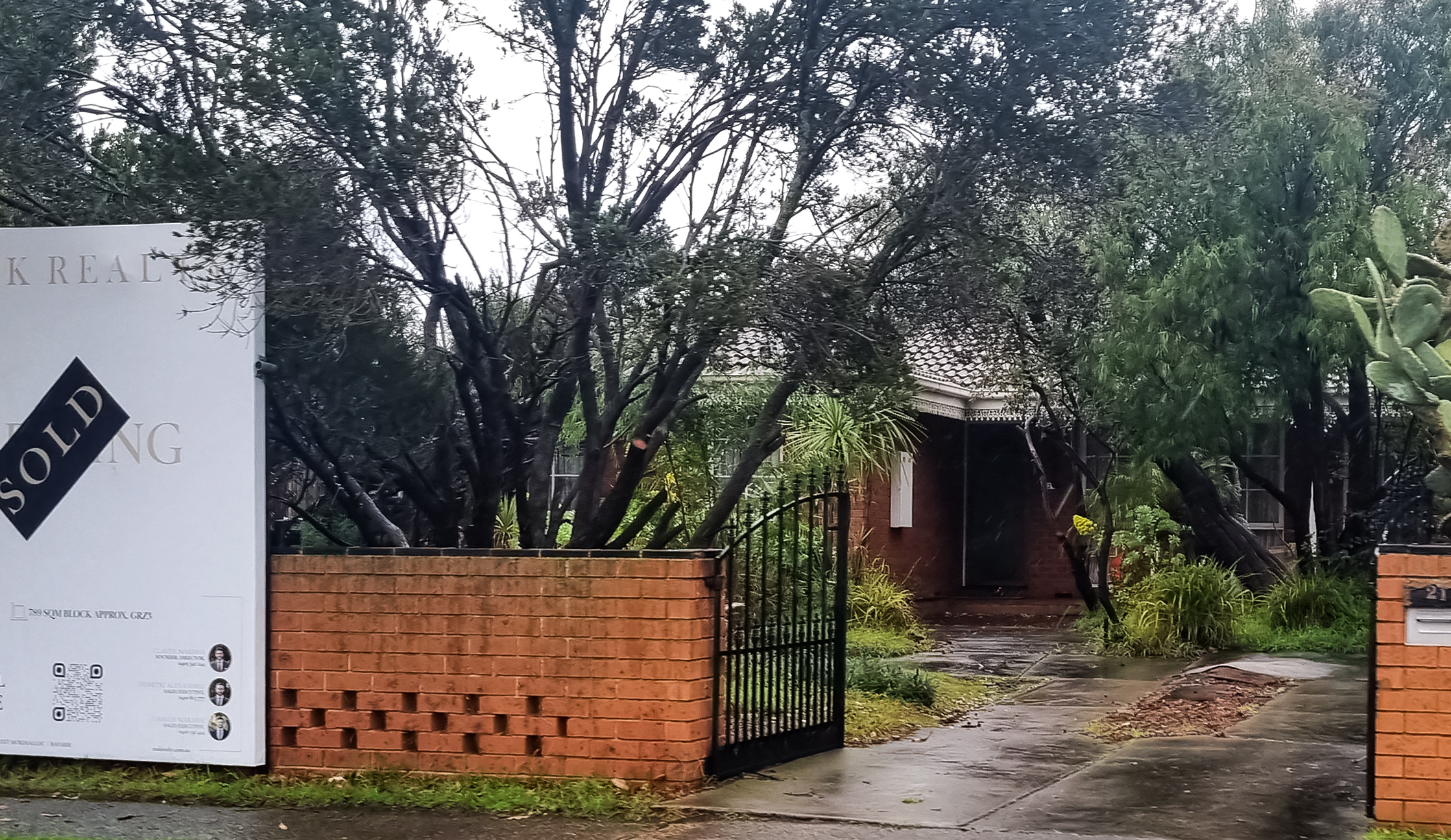
The Property in Victoria after it was sold as stated on sign

== Real estate deal life cycle ==
Real estate investing follows a structured deal cycle, which outlines the key stages involved in identifying, acquiring, managing, and exiting a real estate investment. The cycle typically consists of several phases, including sourcing opportunities, underwriting, due diligence, financing, closing, asset management, and disposition. Investors, whether institutional or private, evaluate potential deals based on factors such as market conditions, property performance, risk assessment, and return objectives.

The process begins with deal sourcing, where investors identify opportunities through broker relationships, off-market transactions, or direct acquisitions. Once a deal is found, the underwriting and due diligence phase involves analyzing financials, market trends, legal risks, and site inspections. Securing financing through debt, equity, or a combination—follows, allowing investors to structure the capital stack efficiently. After closing, asset management strategies, such as leasing, renovations, or repositioning, are implemented to optimize value. The final stage, disposition, involves selling or refinancing the asset to maximize returns.

== Valuation ==
Supply and demand determine real estate valuation.

Real estate markets in most countries are not as organized or efficient as markets for other, more liquid investment instruments. Individual properties are unique to themselves and not directly interchangeable, which makes evaluating investments less certain. Unlike other investments, real estate is fixed in a specific location and derives much of its value from that location. With residential real estate, the perceived safety of a neighborhood and the number of services or amenities nearby can increase the value of a property. For this reason, the economic and social situation in an area is often a major factor in determining the value of its real estate.

Property valuation is often the preliminary step taken during a real estate investment. Information asymmetry is commonplace in real estate markets, where one party may have more accurate information regarding the actual value of the property. Real estate investors typically use a variety of real estate appraisal techniques to determine the value of properties before purchase. This typically includes gathering documents and information about the property, inspecting the physical property, and comparing it to the market value of similar properties. A common method of valuing real estate is by dividing its net operating income by its capitalization rate, or CAP rate.

In commercial real estate, underwriting valuation is conducted using three primary methods: the income approach, the cost approach, and the comparison approach, each providing a method to accessing a property's value. The income approach is estimating the potential income a property can generate based on assessing the market rents and then subtracting the typical operating expenses to get a net operating income. Determining the market cap rate by assessing commercial properties in the area helps determine value through the CAP rate formula: net operating income/Property Value = CAP rate. A reversion of this formula can determine the value of the property using the formula: Property Value = net operating income/CAP rate. The cost approach determines the cost of rebuilding or replacing the asset itself using the formula: Property Value=(Cost of Building New−Depreciation)+Land Value. This approach is based on the principle that a buyer would not pay more for a property than the cost to construct a similar one. The comparison approach (also known as the sales comparison approach) is a method that determines a property's value by analyzing the recent sales prices of similar properties usually referred to as comparables or "comps" in the same market. This assumes that a buyer will not pay more for a property than they would for a comparable substitute.

Numerous national and international real estate appraisal associations exist to standardize property valuation. Some of the larger of these include the Appraisal Institute, the Royal Institution of Chartered Surveyors and the International Valuation Standards Council.

Investment properties are often purchased from a variety of sources, including market listings, real estate agents or brokers, banks, government entities such as Fannie Mae, public auctions, sales by owners, and real estate investment trusts.

Hedonic regression shows real estate value tends to depreciate due to ageing, but can increase with renovation.

== Investment returns ==
Real estate properties may generate revenue through a number of means, including net operating income, tax shelter offsets, equity build-up, and capital appreciation. Net operating income is the sum of all profits from rents and other sources of ordinary income generated by a property, minus the sum of ongoing expenses, such as maintenance, utilities, fees, taxes, and other expenses. Rent is one of the main sources of revenue in commercial real estate investment. Tenants pay an agreed upon sum to landlords in exchange for the use of real property, and may also pay a portion of upkeep or operating expenses on the property.

Tax shelter offsets occur in one of three ways: depreciation (which may sometimes be accelerated), tax credits, and carryover losses which reduce tax liability charged against income from other sources for a period of 27.5 years. Some tax shelter benefits can be transferable, depending on the laws governing tax liability in the jurisdiction where the property is located. These can be sold to others for a cash return or other benefits.

Equity build-up is the increase in the investor's equity ratio as the portion of debt service payments devoted to principal accrue over time. Equity build-up counts as positive cash flow from the asset where the debt service payment is made out of income from the property, rather than from independent income sources.

Capital appreciation is the increase in the market value of the asset over time, realized as a cash flow when the property is sold. Capital appreciation can be very unpredictable unless it is part of a development and improvement strategy. The purchase of a property for which the majority of the projected cash flows are expected from capital appreciation (prices going up) rather than other sources is considered speculation rather than investment. Research results that found that real estate firms are more likely to take a smaller stake in larger assets when investing abroad (Mauck & Price, 2017).

== Financing ==
Real estate assets are typically expensive, and investors will generally not pay the entire amount of the purchase price of a property in cash. Usually, a large portion of the purchase price will be financed using some sort of financial instrument or debt, such as a mortgage loan collateralized by the property itself. The amount of the purchase price financed by debt is referred to as leverage. The amount financed by the investor's own capital, through cash or other asset transfers, is referred to as equity.

=== Financial risk ===
Real estate investing can be categorized by financial risk as core, value-add, and opportunistic. Each of these strategies dictates the risk and risk adjusted returns from each of these strategies.

The ratio of leverage to total appraised value (often referred to as "LTV", or loan to value for a conventional mortgage) is one mathematical measure of the risk an investor is taking by using leverage to finance the purchase of a property. Investors usually seek to decrease their equity requirements and increase their leverage, so that their return on investment is maximized. Lenders and other financial institutions usually have minimum equity requirements for real estate investments they are being asked to finance, typically on the order of 20% of appraised value. Investors seeking low equity requirements may explore alternate financing arrangements as part of the purchase of a property (for instance, seller financing, seller subordination, private equity sources, etc.)

If the property requires substantial repair, traditional lenders like banks will often not lend on a property and the investor may be required to borrow from a private lender using a short-term bridge loan like a hard money loan. Hard money loans are usually short-term loans where the lender charges a much higher interest rate because of the higher-risk nature of the loan. Hard money loans are typically at a much lower loan-to-value ratio than conventional mortgages.

Some real estate investment organizations, such as real estate investment trusts (REITs) and some pension funds and investment firms, have large enough capital reserves and investment strategies to allow 100% equity in the properties that they purchase. This minimizes the risk which comes from leverage but also limits potential return on investment.

By leveraging the purchase of an investment property, the required periodic payments to service the debt create an ongoing (and sometimes large) negative cash flow beginning from the time of purchase. This is sometimes referred to as the carry cost or "carry" of the investment. To be successful, real estate investors must manage their cash flows to create enough positive income from the property to at least offset the carry costs.

In the United States, with the signing of the JOBS Act in April 2012 by President Obama, there was an easing on investment solicitations. A newer method of raising equity in smaller amounts is through real estate crowdfunding which can pool accredited and non-accredited investors together in a special purpose vehicle for all or part of the equity capital needed for the acquisition. Fundrise was the first company to crowdfund a real estate investment in the United States.

In some markets, the term "no-go zone" has been adopted in property investment commentary to describe areas considered unsuitable for investment. In Australia, it has been used to identify specific suburbs considered high-risk due to factors such as oversupply, weak rental yields, and limited capital growth prospects, with annual reports identifying such suburbs attracting coverage in mainstream property media. In the United Kingdom, the term has been applied at a broader market level, with the Home Builders Federation branding London a "no-go zone for housing investment" in 2025, citing planning red tape, building safety regulatory delays, and affordability barriers as factors rendering many development schemes unviable.

=== The capital stack and capital markets ===
The capital stack (seen above) is depicted according to the risk and return associated with each capital source.

The capital stack in real estate investment represents the hierarchy of financing sources used to fund a project, with each layer carrying different levels of risk and return. At the base of the stack is senior debt. Typically, senior debt is provided by banks, life insurance companies, or agency lenders looking to deploy capital and receive predictable cash flow through repayment of loans. It has the lowest risk since it is collateralized by the property and has first priority in repayment or a first lien. However, it also offers the lowest returns, generally ranging from 3–8%.

Above senior loans is mezzanine debt, which bridges the gap between senior debt and common equity. This layer is riskier since it is repaid only after senior debt, but it offers higher interest rates, typically 8–15%. Mezzanine debt may be structured as subordinated debt or preferred equity and sometimes includes conversion rights in case of borrower default. Further up the capital stack, preferred equity sits between mezzanine debt and common equity. Generally, projects will have either preferred equity or mezzanine debt instead of both. Preferred equity investors receive fixed or variable preferred returns (10–20%) before any distributions to common equity holders. While they have more security than common equity investors, they lack the foreclosure rights that debt holders possess. At the top of the stack is common equity, which carries the highest risk but also the greatest potential returns, typically yielding 15% or more in opportunistic deals. Common equity holders are paid last, after all debt and preferred equity obligations are met, meaning their returns depend entirely on the success of the project. However, they also have decision-making power and control over the asset.

Investors in real estate generally play exclusively in the different tranches of the capital stack. This specialization often requires real estate investors to require real estate capital markets experts to help broker transactions to help capitalize projects. Capital markets brokers in real estate serve as intermediaries between property owners, investors, and lenders, facilitating debt and equity financing. In return, capital markets specialists require a commission generally 0.5–2% of the deal as compensation.

== Types of real estate investments ==
Property types dictate how many investors think about their investments. Real estate property types can be split between residential real estate and commercial real estate. Some property types in residential real estate include single family residential, condominiums, townhouses, duplexes, triplexes, mobile homes, and ADUs (Accessory Dwelling Units). Property types for commercial real estate includes office, industrial, retail, hospitality, multifamily, and specialty property types. Some specialized property types within commercial real estate includes data centers, healthcare, facilities, student housing, senior housing, agriculture. The property types would dictate what strategies to use for maximizing returns.

=== Foreclosure investment ===
Some individuals and companies focus their investment strategy on purchasing properties that are in some stage of foreclosure. A property is considered in pre-foreclosure when the homeowner has defaulted on their mortgage loan. Formal foreclosure processes vary by state and may be judicial or non-judicial, which affects the length of time the property is in the pre-foreclosure phase. Once the formal foreclosure processes are underway, these properties can be purchased at a public sale, usually called a foreclosure auction or sheriff's sale. If the property does not sell at the public auction, then ownership of the property is returned to the lender. Properties at this phase are called Real Estate Owned, or REOs.

Once a property is sold at the foreclosure auction or as an REO, the lender may keep the proceeds to satisfy their mortgage and any legal costs that they incurred minus the costs of the sale and any outstanding tax obligations.

The foreclosing bank or lending institution has the right to continue to honor tenant leases (if there are tenants in the property) during the REO phase but usually, the bank wants the property vacant to sell it more easily.

=== Buy, rehab, rent and refinance ===
Buy, rehab, rent, refinance (BRRR) is a real estate investment strategy, used by real estate investors who have experience renovating or rehabbing properties to "flip" houses. BRRR is different from "flipping" houses. Flipping houses implies buying a property and quickly selling it for a profit, with or without repairs. BRRR is a long-term investment strategy that involves renting out a property and letting it appreciate in value before selling it. Renting out a BRRR property provides a stable passive income source that is used to cover mortgage payments while home price appreciation increases future capital gains.

The phrase was slightly updated in a 2022 Bloomberg News article noting that BiggerPockets added "Repeat" to the end, making it "BRRRR" to describe a real estate investing strategy of Buy, Rehab, Rent, Refinance, Repeat.

== Impact ==
According to Lima et al. (2022), in Ireland, the financialization of rental housing, which includes the entry of institutional investors into urban rental housing markets, contributed to structural factors that create homelessness directly by worsening affordability and security in the private rental market, and indirectly by influencing state policy.

Some real estate investors have advocated for increases to immigration and immigrant investor programs in order to increase real estate prices.

Unaffordable housing was found to increase public support for redistribution of income and wealth.

== See also ==
- Cash on cash return
- Commercial property
- Depreciation recapture
- Gentrification
- Houses are for living, not for speculation
- Internal rate of return
- Investment company
- Investment rating for real estate
- Investors United (School of Real Estate Investing)
- Private equity real estate
- Property investment calculator
- Property Management
- Real estate appraisal
- Real estate bubble
- Real estate investment trust (REIT)
- Off-plan property
- Wholesaling
