= Property Trust Group =

Property company of the United Kingdom

- Type: Private company
- Industry: Property investment, development and management.
- Founded: 1959
- Headquarters: Hamilton, Bermuda
- Key people: Anthony K.C. Cheng (Director); Mona M.N. Cheng (Director)
- Website: www.thepropertytrust.co.uk

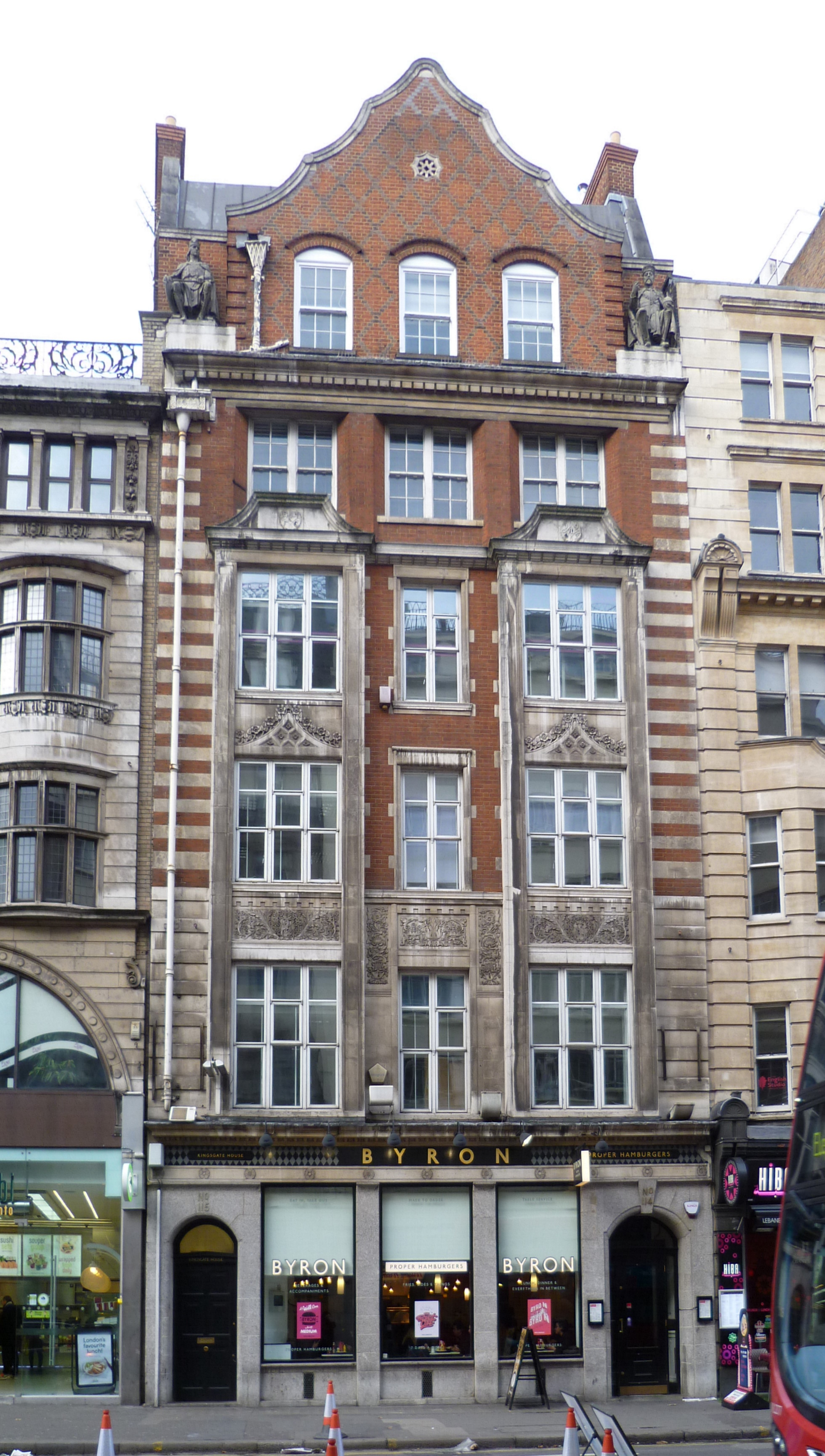
Kingsgate House, 114-115 High Holborn, London.

The Property Trust Group is a property investment group, the ultimate holding company of which is PT Holdings Limited, based in Bermuda. The group owns a portfolio of commercial buildings in the United Kingdom through its subsidiary The Property Trust plc, which is registered in London. The principals of the group are Anthony K.C. Cheng and Mona M.N. Cheng.

== History ==
The business was founded on 17 July 1959 as General Ceylon (Holdings) Limited, but changed its name to The Property Trust plc on 18 January 1985. It was listed on the London Stock Exchange from November 1992 to September 2001. Today, the ultimate holding company of the group is PT Holdings Limited, a company registered in Hamilton, Bermuda. The business operates in the United Kingdom through The Property Trust plc, a company registered in London, and its various subsidiaries.

== Properties ==
The group own a large portfolio of commercial buildings and land in England:

=== Office buildings ===
- Kingsgate House, 114–115, High Holborn, London. A red-brick building with stone facings and separate entrances for numbers 114 and 115, one to the ground floor retail premises at 114 and another to the upper office floors at 115. The building includes statues on the upper storey of King Edward I on the left and King Edward VII on the right.

=== Public houses ===
- The Blue Anchor, 13 Lower Mall, Hammersmith, London, W6 9DJ.
- The Rising Sun, London, EC4V 5DY.
- The Duke of York, London, EC1R 5DU.

=== Woodlands ===
- Freeman's Wood, Lancaster.
