= Odd, West Virginia =

Odd
- Unincorporated community
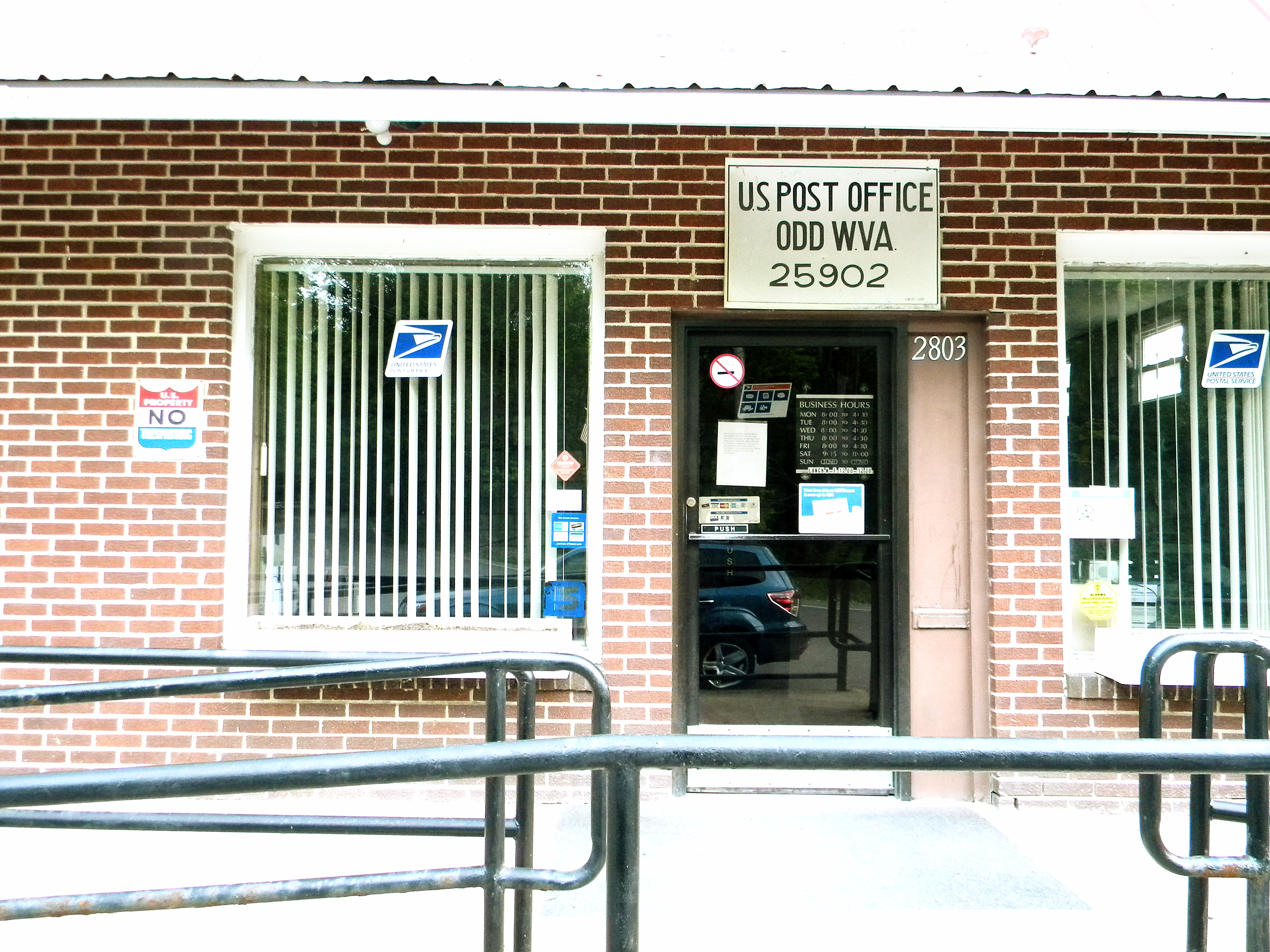
- Odd West Virginia Post Office

- Location within the state of West Virginia Odd (the United States)
- Coordinates: 37°35′36″N 81°11′38″W
- Country: United States
- State: West Virginia
- County: Raleigh

Population (2000)
  - Total: 779
- Time zone: UTC-5 (Eastern (EST))
  - Summer (DST): UTC-4 (EDT)
- ZIP codes: 25902
- GNIS feature ID: 1544325

Odd is an unincorporated community in Raleigh County, West Virginia, United States. It is located along Tommy Creek.

== History ==
The community's unusual name has attracted attention from writers. Townspeople were encouraged to think of an "odd" name for their town, hence the name.

Odd went viral in 2020 when Mark Laita, in his YouTube channel Soft White Underbelly, posted its first video of the Whittaker family, long-time residents of the small town who are inbred.
