= Blue Anchor, Hammersmith =

English pub

Coordinates: 51.4895°N 0.2308°W

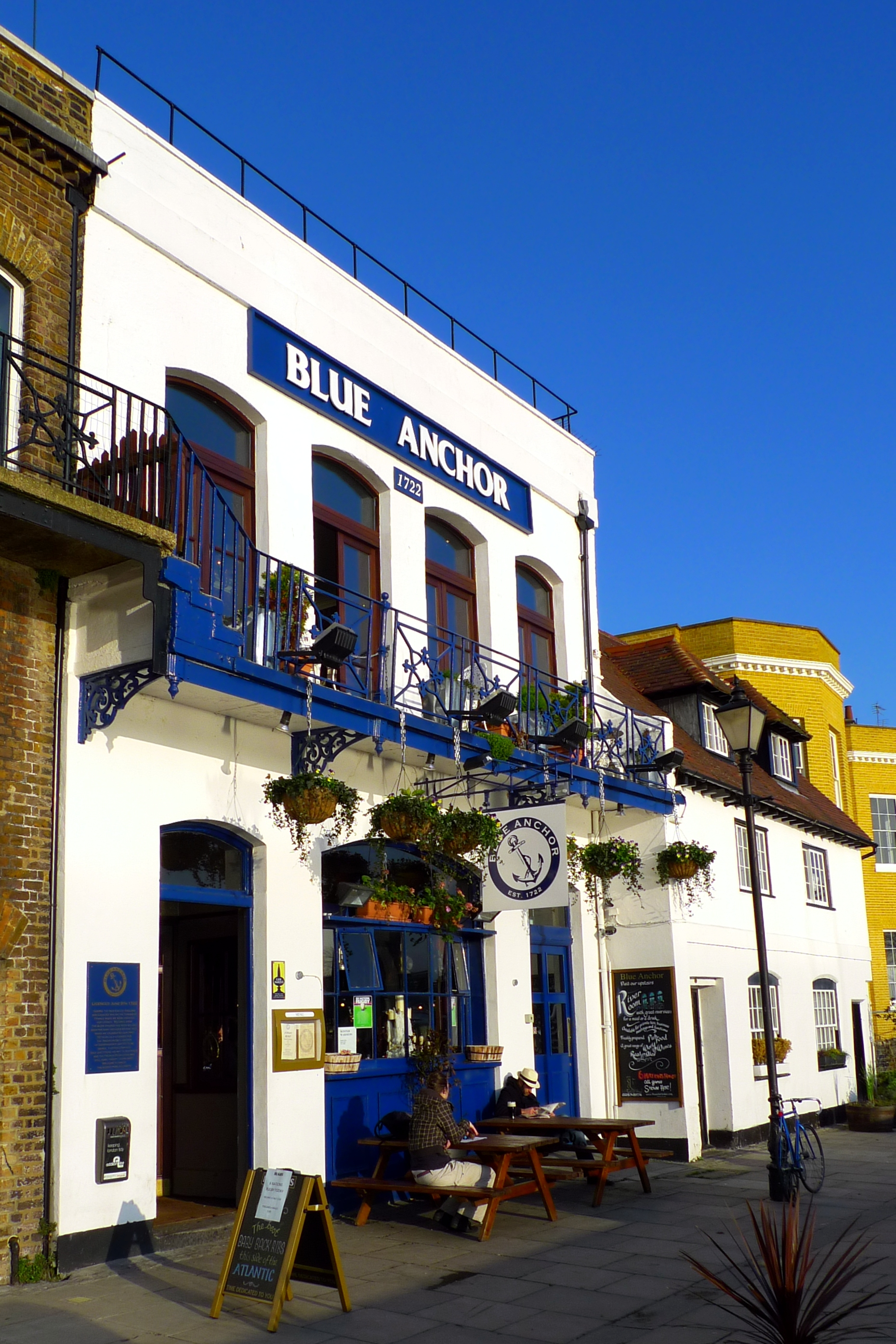
The Blue Anchor

The Blue Anchor is a riverside pub at 13 Lower Mall, Hammersmith, London. It dates from 1722 and is owned by the Bermuda-based Property Trust Group.

The pub was first licensed on 9 June 1722 to a Mr John Savery, and was originally known as the Blew Anchor and Washhouses. On 7 January 1789, a whole sheep, bought for sixteen shillings, was roasted outside.

In the Victorian era, various partitions were added to the interior, but they have been removed. There is a "rather sombre" collection of artefacts from the First World War. Gustav Holst was a frequent visitor and composed his Hammersmith Suite there.

The pub featured in the Gwyneth Paltrow 1998 movie Sliding Doors, where her character is seen dancing with John Hannah's character and others after a boat race. The pub also regularly featured in episodes of the British television show New Tricks.
