= Tyler Oliveira =

American YouTuber (born 2000)

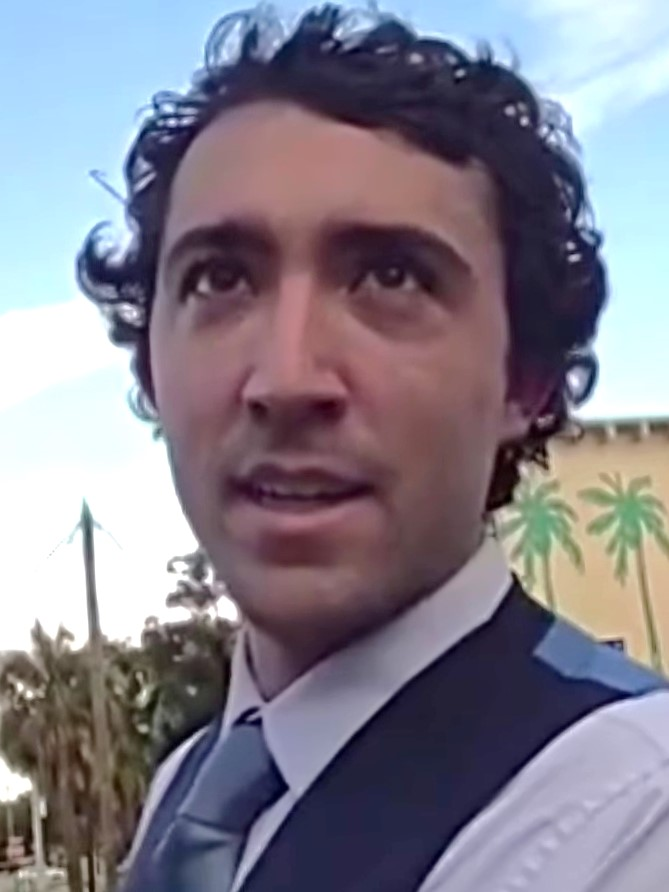
- Oliveira in 2025
- Born: January 6, 2000 (age 26); Modesto, California, U.S.
- Education: University of California, Los Angeles (dropped out)
- Occupation: YouTuber
- Years active: 2018–present

YouTube information
- Channel: @TylerOliveira
- Genres: Man-on-the-street interviews, video essays, investigative journalism
- Subscribers: 9.76 million
- Views: 2.49 billion
- Last updated: 14 October 2026
- Website: tylerraw.com

Tyler Mason Oliveira (born January 6, 2000) is an American right-wing (Note: Attributed to multiple sources:) YouTuber and self-described journalist. He made several challenge videos before moving to videos centered on man-on-the-street interviews, which have covered topics including drug decriminalization in Canada and the Springfield pet-eating hoax in the United States. His YouTube channel has amassed over nine million subscribers.

Born in Modesto, California, Oliveira created his YouTube channel in 2018. Oliveira first gained prominence in that same year through a collaboration with prominent YouTuber MrBeast. From 2023 onwards, Oliveira started making investigative videos and interviews. News organizations and civil rights advocacy groups, such as the Anti-Defamation League and The Forward, have argued that Oliveira's content is disinformation and accused him of spreading antisemitic stereotypes. He has been described by the Jewish Telegraphic Agency as a "right-wing YouTube provocateur". Oliveira has been criticized for perpetuating misinformation and recording interviewees without their consent and misrepresenting them.

Multiple journalists, advocacy organizations, and former interview subjects have additionally accused Oliveira of selectively editing footage, using inflammatory titles, using AI-generated imagery, thumbnails, and structuring videos to reinforce predetermined ideological narratives. Critics have identified a recurring pattern across his videos featuring immigrant, minority, and insular religious communities—including Haitian, Somali, and ethnic Jewish populations—centered on accusations of welfare abuse, demographic invasion, and cultural incompatibility.

In 2026, Oliveira posted a video on YouTube titled "I Exposed New Jersey's Jewish Invasion", which prompted multiple platforms to remove Oliveira's account, including Patreon which permanently removed his creator account, stating the content violated policies prohibiting "inflammatory stereotypes that amplify antisemitic tropes." Later that year, Oliveira was denied entry to Israel after the country's Ministry of Diaspora Affairs and Combating Antisemitism cited his content as including "inciting statements against Jews and the dissemination of content with antisemitic characteristics."

== Early life ==
Tyler Mason Oliveira was born on January 6, 2000, in Modesto, California. According to a July 2025 Oliveira post on X, he is of Portuguese descent on his father's side through the surname Oliveira and of Scottish descent on his mother's side through the surname "Dunlap". Oliveira attended the University of California, Los Angeles (UCLA), before dropping out in January 2019.

== YouTube career ==
=== 2018–2023: Early career and challenge videos ===
Oliveira first gained popularity in 2018 through a collaboration with prominent YouTuber Jimmy Donaldson, better known as MrBeast online. Donaldson identified Oliveira as the seven-millionth subscriber to his channel and featured him in a challenge video, which provided Oliveira's channel with a substantial boost in visibility. He subsequently built a following based on stunt and challenge videos before moving to a documentary and investigative format. The Times of Israel and the Jewish Telegraphic Agency described this later phase of Oliveira's channel as one in which he "visits communities—from Thailand to Flint, Michigan—to produce exposé-style content," noting that his videos "sometimes probe alleged fraud; other times they ridicule the people he encounters."

Between 2019 and 2021, Oliveira posted several fitness challenge videos, including imitating the workout of the fictional character Saitama from the Japanese manga One-Punch Man, running on a treadmill for twenty-four hours straight, bench pressing his own weight underwater, performing the Murph challenge daily for a month, and training to be a boxer in thirty days.

Oliveira posted a video in January 2020 in which he attempted to absorb the water in a swimming pool using a large quantity of paper towel rolls. After realizing the attempt would require more than a million paper towels, he exploded the remaining rolls using a firework. Multiple viewers criticized the video as wasteful. Oliveira initially defended the stunt, arguing that the paper towels would have existed regardless of his use of them, before apologizing several days later and stating he had donated $1,000 to the Australian Red Cross.

=== 2023–present: Interview and investigative videos ===
In November 2023, Oliveira released a video covering drug decriminalization in Vancouver, Canada. British Columbia legislative representative Elenore Sturko appeared near the end of the video and subsequently labelled the entire video "inaccurate and exploitative," stating she had been filmed without consent—a claim disputed by an advocate from the Overdose Prevention Society. A man was filmed while suffering from a drug overdose without his consent, which a harm reduction and recovery expert described as "disgusting." Harm reduction advocates also alleged that footage filmed by co-creator Kevin Dahlgren, presented as being recorded inside an overdose prevention site, was actually filmed inside a homeless shelter. In a National Post opinion piece, Colby Cosh defended the video as both legal and ethical and criticised CTV News for "discouraging competitors" in journalism. Oliveira stated in response to criticism, "If our documentary prevented a single child from going down this same life path, then I have succeeded."

In March 2024, Oliveira interviewed the Whittakers, a family described in prior media coverage and tabloids as "America's most inbred family". YouTuber Mark Laita, creator of Soft White Underbelly, had previously interviewed the family and established a GoFundMe account purportedly to assist them in purchasing a home. Oliveira publicly questioned whether the money raised had been delivered to the family. Laita responded with a video presenting several bank transaction records and stated that the family's conditions had improved as a result of the fundraiser; he subsequently ended the fundraiser and announced he would stop filming the family. Writing for Vox, A.W. Ohlheiser described the genre of both creators as "poverty porn," arguing that such content left viewers entertained rather than motivated to address structural causes of poverty.

In September 2024, Oliveira posted on X (formerly Twitter) a series of interviews with residents of Springfield, United States, focused on Haitian residents in the city. Several interviewees made unsubstantiated claims about Haitian immigrants eating pets, and one interviewee told Oliveira that he had seen police pull over Haitian immigrants carrying a hundred cats in a white van who admitted to eating them—a claim not corroborated by police. In one video, an interviewee called his Haitian neighbour a "sand monkey", a racial slur. Oliveira subsequently posted a YouTube video about Springfield interspersed with AI-generated images and memes, which attracted 4.5 million views within ten days. The video also featured footage unrelated to Springfield, including the arrest of a woman in Canton, United States, for eating a cat and gang members marching in a street in Haiti. A Haitian interviewee stated he had been falsely depicted as a reckless driver; the video's cover image featured a separate Haitian man whose image had been digitally altered to show him holding a cat. Multiple news outlets identified Oliveira as part of a broader trend of right-wing influencers who travelled to Springfield based on debunked allegations about Haitian immigrants.

In late October 2025, Oliveira posted a series of videos documenting his participation in the Gorehabba festival, a Hindu cow-dung rite specific to a single village in Karnataka. The videos quickly spread across social media platforms. Commentators criticized the videos as culturally insensitive and sensationalized, with several noting that Oliveira's presentation gave the misleading impression that the cow-dung rite represented broader Hinduism, even though the event is specific to a single village and is not observed elsewhere in India. Oliveira published a statement on social media that he described as an apology, characterizing it as sarcastic; he also asserted the coverage was not racist.

==== Minneapolis Somali community video ====
In December 2025, Oliveira posted a video titled "Inside Minneapolis' Somali Invasion," which became a more widely viewed video by fellow right-wing YouTuber Nick Shirley, released on December 26, 2025, which purported to show that several Minneapolis daycare centers operated primarily by Somali Americans appeared inactive despite receiving state subsidies. Shirley's video triggered federal attention, including statements from Homeland Security Secretary Kristi Noem and an FBI and Department of Homeland Security surge of resources into Minnesota to investigate suspected fraud in social service and daycare programs—investigations that predated the video. Fortune reported that the facilities and community advocates denied wrongdoing, arguing that "short, unannounced visits do not accurately capture enrollment patterns, operating hours, or off-site programming," and that civil rights groups and Somali community leaders warned the political reaction "risks stigmatizing Somali Minnesotans as a whole." The 19th News published a fact-check characterizing much of the subsequent media coverage as "misleading," noting that state authorities had not confirmed the centers in Shirley's video had engaged in criminal fraud.

Multiple news outlets subsequently compared Oliveira's Minneapolis video to his later videos targeting Orthodox Jewish communities, identifying it as part of a broader content pattern. The Forward noted that Oliveira used the Minneapolis controversy as an explicit public bridge to his subsequent videos about Jewish communities, posting on X while promoting the Kiryas Joel video: "If Americans are upset about Somalis in Minneapolis not assimilating and living according to 'Sharia law' while sucking the teat of welfare programs... then what's the excuse for this religious ethno-state feeding their massive families with your secular tax-dollars?" In the Tucker Carlson interview, Oliveira described his method of finding the Kiryas Joel subject as follows: "We were looking for ethnic enclaves doing the same thing as Dearborn, Michigan, or Hamtramck, or Minneapolis. So I looked up Jewish ethnic enclaves on Google only to find Kiryas Joel."

==== Indian American community videos ====
In April 2026, Oliveira released a documentary titled "I Exposed Texas' Indian Invasion…", focused on the rapid growth of the Indian American population in Frisco, Texas. The video received over two millions views. The documentary followed a viral dispute that had begun independently of Oliveira at a January 20, 2026, Frisco City Council meeting, where resident Marc Palasciano alleged widespread H-1B visa fraud and suggested the city's demographic shift was the result of organized manipulation, also questioning donations to Indian American councilman Burt Thakur and Mayor Jeff Cheney. Thakur rejected the allegations as baseless, noted that the City of Frisco does not directly employ H-1B workers, and stated he would welcome a federal audit. Palasciano subsequently acknowledged he had confused two similarly named companies in one allegation against Thakur and issued a correction, while maintaining his broader concerns. CBS News Texas reported that Palasciano had offered no evidence of fraud at the meetings and noted a steep national decline in H-1B registrations contemporaneous with the controversy.

=== 2026–present: Antisemitism allegations and deplatforming ===
On January 16, 2026, Oliveira posted a video on YouTube titled "Inside the New York Town Invaded by Welfare-Addicted Jews," focused on the Hasidic Jewish community of Kiryas Joel, United States, a Satmar Hasidic village of approximately 44,000 residents in Orange County. The approximately 40-minute video garnered nearly 5 million views.

The Anti-Defamation League (ADL) wrote that Oliveira's claims "harken back to age-old antisemitic stereotypes." The Blue Square Alliance (BSA), a media monitoring advocacy organization, published a content analysis stating that Oliveira "repeatedly confronts Hasidic men on the street" about employment, Torah study, wives' work status, and family size, and that men who declined to answer "would be framed as evidence of guilt." The BSA noted Oliveira's narration included the line: "What I'm hearing is they'll gladly take money out of the American tax base to support their lifestyle." The BSA also documented that the video generated antisemitic comment activity, including posts such as "If you die we all know jews did it" and "Tyler is not suicidal, guys," which the BSA characterized as implying Jewish actors would harm those who exposed them.

Kiryas Joel school superintendent Joel Petlin wrote publicly that Oliveira had "exposed himself to be an antisemite." Activist Naftuli Moster, a former Hasidic community member and founder of the advocacy organisation YAFFED, contended in a Wall Street Journal opinion piece that Oliveira's claims were inaccurate, arguing that many of the men engaged in religious study also worked full-time or would do so in the near future. Frieda Vizel, a former Kiryas Joel resident who produces content about Hasidic life, published a rebuttal describing the video as "absolutely disgusting" and a "shock piece" that was "decontextualized" and designed to mislead viewers. Vizel argued that Oliveira deliberately avoided the thousands of Hasidic Jews employed in offices and businesses throughout Kiryas Joel, focusing instead on street encounters structured to generate confrontation.

==== Lakewood, New Jersey video ====
On February 23, 2026, Oliveira posted a video on YouTube titled "I Exposed New Jersey's Jewish Invasion," focused on the Orthodox Jewish community of Lakewood, United States. The video reached over eight million views on YouTube, and an associated Instagram reel surpassed thirteen million views with over 18,000 comments; collectively, the video accumulated more than 25 million views across platforms within four days of its release. The video accused the Orthodox Jewish community of welfare fraud and of plotting a political takeover of the township, and opened with the greeting "Hello Goyim." The video cited a 2017 indictment of a rabbi on charges of stealing public funds from a school he founded—charges that were later dismissed—as evidence of wider community wrongdoing.

===== Release and reception =====
Around the time of the video's release, Oliveira posted seven related Instagram reels using titles including "Jewish Invasion," "Jewish Police," "Jewish Values vs Goyim Values," and "Stop Anti Goyism 2026," with rhetoric that was reminiscent of the neo-Nazi Goyim Defense League. A BSA content analysis examined the top 106 comments by engagement across Oliveira's YouTube and Instagram posts related to the video, finding that approximately 38 percent of Instagram comments and 53 percent of YouTube comments were categorised as antisemitic. The analysis found that social media mentions of Oliveira's name alongside terms related to Jewish culture, antisemitism, or Israel had surged by over 4,400 percent compared with the equivalent prior period following the Kiryas Joel video. Several popular comments on the Lakewood video made reference to "noticing"—a term The Forward and The Jerusalem Post both identified as a coded antisemitic term used to describe identifying supposed Jewish influence over society. The Times of Israel described the video as featuring "man-on-the-street encounters and selective interviews that frame local disputes over welfare, land use and political influence as evidence of a broader 'Jewish invasion.'"

Richard Roberts, a prominent Lakewood resident and philanthropist who agreed to a three-hour interview for the video, subsequently described it as a "hit piece" that had been "chopped" to fit a predetermined narrative. He told the JTA that Oliveira "was looking to cast a negative light on Orthodox Jews" and that he was "a provocateur who wants to get clicks," adding: "There's a major financial incentive to be an antisemite, whether it's expressed as anti-Israel or explicitly as anti-Jewish." Roberts hired his own videographer to record the interview and announced plans to release the full unedited footage. Keith Krivitzky, managing director of the Jewish Federation of Ocean County, called the video a "blatant attempt to stir animosity towards the Orthodox community in Lakewood." The Forward criticised Oliveira for what it characterised as an internally inconsistent argument, noting that "he vacillates between claiming Orthodox Jews are engaged in fraud and acknowledging they legitimately qualify for programs like Medicaid and food stamps," and also observed that "at several points he complains of a double standard that allows Jews to live together but supposedly prevents white people from doing the same, posting screenshots of the Forward's coverage of a white supremacist settlement in Arkansas that forbids Jews."

The video was initially endorsed by Nick Shirley, a YouTuber known for the viral Minneapolis daycare video, who responded "EXPOSE IT ALL" before subsequently distancing himself from the controversy. Right-wing activist Laura Loomer criticized the video, writing "Expose what? Jewish U.S. citizens living their life peacefully?" and accused Tucker Carlson of "mainstreaming a generation of Jew obsessed podcasters and content creators." A nicotine pouch company owned by Tucker Carlson posted on X, "Chat, should we sponsor Tyler? 👀" in response to Patreon's removal of Oliveira, before Carlson later hosted Oliveira on his show. Far-right American streamer and social media personality, Sneako wrote on X: "Nick Shirley makes a video about Somali daycares, gets pushed by the entire Peter Thiel/MAGA cabal. Elon, JD Vance, Rumble, all glazing benevolently. Tyler Oliveira exposes how Jews in Jersey scam tax payers… no-one says a word." White nationalist Nick Fuentes similarly accused conservatives of applying a double standard, writing: "They actually believe that the rules just shouldn't apply to Jewish people." Kiryas Joel superintendent Joel Petlin rejected that framing, posting on X: "If you can't tell the difference between fraud and harassment, then you've just exposed yourself to be an antisemite." Oliveira wrote in reply to Shirley: "Does welfare abuse/fraud only suck when it's a Somali? Ask your local 'MAGA Republican influencer' where he draws the line."

==== Deplatforming and sponsor withdrawals ====
Following the Lakewood video, multiple platforms removed Oliveira. Patreon permanently removed his creator account, stating the content violated policies prohibiting "inflammatory stereotypes that amplify antisemitic tropes." Facebook also banned Oliveira. His personal website was taken offline by hosting provider Hetzner, which cited violations of German law under the NetzDG statute, the alleged exploitation of vulnerable populations, and circumvention of platform bans. Multiple corporate sponsors also withdrew their advertising partnerships, citing reputational concerns. Oliveira stated publicly: "When they can't call you a liar, they attack your name… they delete your platform."

==== Tucker Carlson interview ====
On May 8, 2026, Oliveira appeared in an approximately 85-minute interview on The Tucker Carlson Show, in an episode titled "Tyler Oliveira on the Foreigners Exploiting American Cities and the Consequences of Exposing It." During the interview, Oliveira described Kiryas Joel as "definitionally a parasitic, uh, insulated Jewish community" and alleged that residents were "living off of the teat of the welfare system." When discussing criticism of his content, Oliveira stated: "they're leveraging the generational guilt of the Holocaust. You're antisemitic if you oppose any of what they're doing... Just to be clear, the Holocaust was not committed by Americans. We were actually the people who ended it." Oliveira also described finding Kiryas Joel by searching online for "Jewish ethnic enclaves" after producing the Minneapolis video, looking for communities "doing the same thing as Dearborn, Michigan, or Hamtramck, or Minneapolis."

==== Denial of entry to Israel ====
On May 12, 2026, Oliveira was denied entry to Israel at Ben Gurion Airport and deported to the United States under Amendment No. 40 of Israel's Entry into Israel Law of 1952. Israel's Ministry of Diaspora Affairs and Combating Antisemitism issued a formal statement citing his activity as going "beyond legitimate freedom of expression" and including "inciting statements against Jews and the dissemination of content with antisemitic characteristics." The ministry specifically referenced statements made during the Tucker Carlson interview, attributing to Oliveira claims that "Jews systematically exploit the generosity of others" and "use intergenerational guilt surrounding the Holocaust for their own needs," and also citing his February 2026 statement that he aimed to "expose the invasion of the Jewish community" into New Jersey. Diaspora Affairs Minister Amichai Chikli stated: "The party is over. Whoever comes here with the goal of sowing hatred can go back where they came from."

==== E-Rate video ====
On 20 September 2026, hours before Yom Kippur, Oliveira posted a 55-minute video titled "I Exposed a Jewish Fraud Ring Stealing From Poor Kids". The video focused on E-Rate, a federal program subsidising internet services and equipment for schools and libraries, and was filmed partly in New Square in Rockland County. Ynetnews reported that it drew approximately 6.3 million views on X and 2.3 million on YouTube in under two days.

Oliveira cited earlier E-Rate prosecutions, including a 2018 case in which seven Orthodox defendants pleaded guilty to a $14 million fraud and the January 2026 guilty plea of school consultant Richard Bernstein to a kickback conspiracy. He then alleged that 10 companies served 77 Jewish institutions, that one individual appeared in corporate records tied to nine of them, and that 93.7% of 633 bidding processes received one bid or none. Ynetnews described these figures as Oliveira's own presentation of the records and reported that the video did not establish that the patterns amounted to criminal conduct.

Oliveira acknowledged in the video's description that, other than the earlier convictions, no person, school or company featured had been charged and no government authority had found the conduct unlawful. He also acknowledged that a high price or single bid does not by itself prove fraud. Ynetnews reported that the video's title and framing prompted thousands of antisemitic comments portraying Jews collectively as criminals, and noted that the earlier convictions did not substantiate a "Jewish fraud ring" or show wrongdoing by unrelated institutions.

== Style and critical reception ==
=== Format and approach ===
Oliveira's videos focus primarily on areas characterised by poverty or social controversy and feature man-on-the-street interviews. Writing for Vox, A.W. Ohlheiser compared Oliveira's approach to that of MrBeast, arguing that Oliveira used "shock and extravagance" to attract viewers. His most widely viewed videos frequently feature recordings of people experiencing mental breakdowns or drug addictions.

The Blue Square Alliance Against Hate described a recurrent structural formula across Oliveira's community-focused videos: arriving unannounced at an insular community, conducting confrontational street interviews with residents unprepared for media scrutiny, focusing heavily on welfare statistics and cultural differences, selectively editing responses to support a predetermined narrative about taxpayer burden and lack of integration, and packaging the content with inflammatory titles designed to maximise engagement. The Times of Israel similarly described Oliveira's methodology as relying on "man-on-the-street encounters and selective interviews" structured to frame community-specific disputes as evidence of a larger, threatening pattern.

Several people who participated in Oliveira's videos subsequently accused him of misrepresenting their words through selective editing. Richard Roberts, who gave Oliveira a three-hour interview for the Lakewood video, described the final cut as a "hit piece" that had been "chopped" to fit a narrative Oliveira had decided upon in advance; Roberts responded by hiring a videographer to document the full unedited interview for independent release. Similarly, British Columbia MLA Elenore Sturko alleged that her appearance in Oliveira's Vancouver video was obtained without informed consent and that the broader video was "inaccurate and exploitative." Frieda Vizel, who produced a detailed rebuttal of the Kiryas Joel video, argued that Oliveira's editing systematically excluded working members of the Hasidic community in favour of street encounters engineered to produce confrontation and imply broader guilt.

=== Recurring thematic patterns ===
Journalists and commentators have noted similarities across Oliveira's videos focused on immigrant, religious, and insular communities. Writing for The Forward, Arno Rosenfeld observed that Oliveira's videos on communities in Dearborn, Hamtramck, Springfield, Minneapolis, Kiryas Joel, and Lakewood frequently focused on themes relating to welfare usage, cultural separation, and demographic change. Rosenfeld also noted that Oliveira described searching for ethnic and religious "enclaves" while discussing how he selected subjects for his videos during an interview on The Tucker Carlson Show.

The Anti-Defamation League and the Blue Square Alliance criticised Oliveira's videos about Jewish communities as relying on antisemitic stereotypes and inflammatory framing. NPR and The Verge included Oliveira among a broader group of right-wing influencers who amplified debunked claims about Haitian immigrants in Springfield, United States. NPR and The Verge also noted that Oliveira's Springfield content incorporated AI-generated imagery and footage unrelated to Springfield itself.

=== Allegations of amplification of extremist and hateful commentary ===
Several organisations and commentators have criticised the response generated by Oliveira's videos on social media platforms, particularly videos focused on minority and immigrant communities. Following the release of the Kiryas Joel and Lakewood videos, the Blue Square Alliance documented antisemitic comments and conspiracy-related rhetoric appearing in associated online discussions. The organisation's analysis of high-engagement comments on the Lakewood video found that many comments contained antisemitic language or themes.

Coverage of Oliveira's Springfield video noted that interviewees used racial slurs on camera and that the video's thumbnail digitally altered the image of a Haitian man to depict him holding a cat. NPR and The Verge reported that the Springfield content circulated widely within online discussions relating to false claims about Haitian immigrants.

=== Criticism of reporting methods ===
Several journalists, commentators, and advocacy organisations have criticised Oliveira's reporting style and presentation methods. Writing for Vox, A.W. Ohlheiser argued that Oliveira's content fit within a broader genre of "poverty porn" focused more on outrage and entertainment than on informing audiences about structural issues.

Frieda Vizel criticised Oliveira's video about Kiryas Joel, describing it as misleading and arguing that it omitted information about the community's working population and economic structure. The Blue Square Alliance criticised the format and presentation style of Oliveira's videos, describing recurring elements such as confrontational interviews, provocative thumbnails, and emotionally charged framing as contributing to inflammatory portrayals of minority communities. Keith Krivitzky, a Lakewood official interviewed in coverage surrounding Oliveira's videos, accused the content of encouraging hostility toward Orthodox Jewish communities.

Oliveira has rejected accusations that his content is misleading or antisemitic. Following criticism and platform moderation actions relating to his videos about Jewish communities, Oliveira argued that critics were attempting to suppress discussion of issues affecting those communities rather than responding to the substance of his reporting. During an interview with Tucker Carlson, Oliveira argued that criticism of his videos about Jewish communities improperly framed scrutiny of those communities as inherently antisemitic.
