= Soft White Underbelly (YouTube channel) =

Series of interviews

YouTube information
- Channel: Soft White Underbelly
- Years active: 2016–present
- Genres: Biography, documentary
- Subscribers: 6.53 million
- Views: 1.5 billion
- Last updated: December 2 2025

Soft White Underbelly is an American YouTube channel by Mark Laita (born 1960) that interviews "people who are frequently invisible in society—the unhoused, the sex worker, the chronic drug user, the runaway, the gang member, the poor and the sick". Laita, who previously worked as a commercial photographer, created the channel in April 2016 as an extension of his photo book Created Equal (2009).

== Interviews ==
Laita created the YouTube channel in April 2016. After posting an interview with a 21-year-old prostitute named Kelly in December 2019, the channel grew from 3000 subscribers to more than 500,000 subscribers in less than three months.

Many interviews take place in Laita's small studio on Skid Row in Los Angeles in front of a backdrop that Paper magazine calls "yearbook photo-esque" and consist of questions about the interviewee's childhood, lifestyle, and plans for the future. He takes a black-and-white portrait of subjects to use as the video's thumbnail on YouTube. Laita compensates his subjects in various ways, including money, purchasing phones, and funding recovery programs. One subject, Kelly, told The Washington Post that Laita is known around Skid Row as someone who talks to people and gives them money. In 2020, The Washington Post reported that he gave between $20 and $40 to interviewees and up to $100 to people who were more at risk of being exposed, such as drug dealers and sex workers. He does not always share the details of the compensation he gives subjects, and he told Paper "I don't want it to be videos about me helping people. I think that's kind of gross."

Many of the channel's interviewees are residents of Skid Row. Subjects include a former 13-year-old prostitute, ex-Amish women, and Dave Matthews Band tour bus driver Jerry Fitzpatrick (who commented on the Dave Matthews Band Chicago River incident). Some of the channel's most well-known characters are the Whittakers, an inbred family in rural Odd, West Virginia, whom Laita visits. In videos, Laita takes the family on excursions such as the state fair, a bowling alley, and grocery shopping sprees. Laita held a crowdsourced fundraiser to purchase the Whittaker family a new house. In 2024, YouTuber Tyler Oliveira questioned Laita's honesty and posted a video at the Whittakers' house in which a family member asked "What house?" and stated "Mark says we ain't got no more money in the fundraiser.” Laita responded with receipts documenting that he had sent the family more than $100,000 over the three years they filmed together. Laita stated that one of the Whittakers lied about her father dying and asked for funeral money, which she used to buy drugs. Another prominent character is Rebecca, a 26-year-old homeless trans woman on Skid Row whose personality and musings on fashion and culture have attracted loyal fans and whose struggles with drug addiction are displayed in real time.

== Reception ==
Lateshia Beachum wrote in the Washington Post that "Laita's warmly lit videos are portraits of addicts who recount childhood sexual abuse with detachment, sex workers who shed tears while telling of betrayal that led them to be trafficked as children, and gang members who talk about missing out on having their parents' affection." Breanna Robinson wrote in Indy100 that "Soft White Underbelly is captivating because of the way it humanizes those who have society's stamp of condemnation on them."

The channel gained attention in 2021 after the death of one of its three-time interviewees, a 25-year-old sex worker and recovering crack cocaine addict named Amanda.

While commenters and critics have raised concerns that Laita's videos are poverty porn, supporters of his work describe it as "compassionate and humanizing". Other commentators have questioned the veracity of subjects' stories about themselves.
