= Investors United (School of Real Estate Investing) =

Investors United School of Real Estate Investing
- Motto: Earn while you learn.
- Type: private co-ed
- Established: 1980
- President: Ian Parrish
- Faculty: 17
- Students: 126
- Other students: 1246 (graduates)
- Location: Baltimore, MD, USA
- Campus: Baltimore, MD
- Colors: Green and Gray
- Website: www.investorsunited.com

Investors United School of Real Estate Investing is a for-profit educational institution and membership association based out of Baltimore, Maryland, USA. The school offers on-campus and online training on real estate investing.

Founded in 1980 by real estate entrepreneur and auctioneer Charles Parrish, Investors United has expanded its operations from a single classroom with a local focus, to an institution with services offered nationally.

In addition to its corporate name, Investors United also holds several registered trademarks including its motto: "You will succeed - Guaranteed", and slogan "Earn while you learn."

== History ==
In the early 1970s, Charles Parrish had established himself as a real estate investor in Maryland. By forming partnerships with other real estate practitioners, he created several small, informal real estate investment groups that were connected to each other primarily through him. Noticing a lack of permanent networking outlet for people interested in real estate investment, Charles Parrish established the Maryland Real Estate Investors Association (MDREIA).

During meetings of the MDREIA, veteran real estate developers found themselves regularly answering questions from new investors and home buyers interested in getting the best value from the purchase or sale of their real estate. Parrish recognized the public interest in the knowledge that he and his colleagues had accumulated, so he began organizing classes that he believed would apply broadly to real estate buyers and sellers, whether they were single family homeowners or high-rise developers.

In 1980, Investors United began as a single-classroom consulting program and investment group led by Charles Parrish. Invited personally by Parrish, the inaugural members were all working real estate investors who were interested in learning new techniques and teaching them to others to enhance the overall capabilities of the group. Since that time, the school has expanded and updated its courses to cover trends and methods that have evolved since its founding.

In 1998, Ian Parrish became President of Investors United School of Real Estate Investing and began an initiative to increase the school's reach and capabilities. In 2001, the school acquired the former headquarters of the Madison & Bradford Bank in Baltimore, MD; and all of Investors United's classrooms and administrative offices were moved to the 31,000 square foot facility. To accommodate the school's expansion, all classrooms and conference rooms were upgraded to accommodate online interactivity. The move also allowed for the addition of meeting suites, a multi-media computer lab, and a real estate library.

== Instructional program ==
Investors United's instructional program is based on the Montessori method and philosophy of education, which values self-paced learning and real-world engagement. The school offers online courses.

The Investors United' curriculum of 12 courses represent what its president, Ian Parrish, calls "the full anatomy of real estate investing".

All of the school's courses and instructional materials are available online, so that each student can learn at their own pace. Ongoing personal support is provided to students weekly in three-hour workshops.

== Enrollment and membership ==
The people who make up Investors United's membership body are socio-economically diverse, and include business owners, military and law enforcement, PhDs, everyday wage earners, and even public figures. Notwithstanding, Investors United maintains a comparatively low new student enrollment rate. Since its inception, the school has averaged fewer than 200 new students per year. However, after the initial year-long training, membership longevity in Investors United is quite high; the number of members in the institution currently outstrips the student population (or "members in training" as the school calls them) by a ratio of over 5 to 1.

== Environmental initiatives ==
In 2001, in response to Ian Parrish's interest in environmentally efficient building methods, Investors United began adding Green Building techniques into its curriculum. Several studies have shown that structures renovated using sustainable design methods decrease their environmental impact on the surrounding community and increase both their resale and rental values. Parrish stated in a 2008 message to his members that “Adopting these techniques now won’t just help us avoid problems later. They’ll save on materials, on water, on fuel, and on money. As investors, we call that a win-win.”

== Distance learning ==
Distance learning is offered by the school using Sonic Foundry's Mediasite system that allows for interactive real-time communication with online instructors. The school archives classes on its server for up to 3 years, allowing Student Members to review classes and view previous versions of current and upcoming courses. The Mediasite software is activated through a portal using the Moodle open-source Learning Management System (LMS).

== Support systems ==
In 2010, Investors United entered into an agreement with CoreLogic, the custodian of First American Corporation's U.S. database of properties, to license a software system that would allow members to gather property, neighborhood, and owner information. First American, through Corelogic, collects and distributes property ownership, geographic, and demographic information used by investors, capital markets, and government agencies. The resulting Web site, IURealist.com, was then made available to IU members at no charge, and to non-members as a paid subscription service.

The organization maintains a database of forms and reference materials on its servers for use by its members. In 2009, the school's directors began reviewing and summarizing proposed state and federal property legislation. Each year, Investors United sends those summaries directly to its members, and makes them available to any interested party via the school's Web site.

In early 2011, the school's directors chose to convert student texts and instructional materials to an exclusively electronic format. For on-campus students, all such materials are currently being stored on an Amazon Kindle, which is given to new Student Members upon admission.
