= BiggerPockets =

American company

BiggerPockets is an American company based in Denver, Colorado. It focuses on real estate investing education and the benefits of investing in rental properties.

Eric Augustyn has been chief executive officer since June 2026, succeeding Scott Trench.

== History ==
BiggerPockets was founded in 2004 by Joshua Dorkin. It was originally a message board for real estate investors to ask questions and share best practices. He started the company with no venture capital financing and no outside investment. Dorkin served as the CEO of BiggerPockets for 14 years. Their first employees were hired in 2013.

The company states it has more than 3 million members. As of March 2022, its online forums had 2 million members.

BiggerPockets coined the phrase “BRRRR” to describe a real estate investing strategy of Buy, Rehab, Rent, Refinance, Repeat. This is similar to the BRRR strategy but includes the additional “R” for Repeat.

In 2006, members of the BiggerPockets message board helped uncover fraud at Pinnacle Development Partners. That resulted in an SEC investigation and later shutdown of the firm after it was revealed to be a Ponzi scheme.

In 2016, the company had annual revenue of $7 million from advertising, memberships, and partnership income.

== Podcasts ==
The BiggerPockets podcast was launched in 2013 by company founder Josh Dorkin. In March 2022, it was the top real estate investing podcast.

In February 2023, the company claimed over 161 million total podcast downloads.

== Books ==
Their publishing department, BiggerPockets Publishing, has published several books, including:

- How to Invest in Real Estate: The Ultimate Beginner's Guide to Getting Started
- Buy, Rehab, Rent, Refinance, Repeat: The BRRRR Rental Property Investment Strategy Made Simple
- Turner, Brandon (2015). The Book on Rental Property Investing: How to Create Wealth With Intelligent Buy and Hold Real Estate Investing. BiggerPockets. ISBN 978-0990711797.
