= Common equity =

Common equity is the amount that all common shareholders have invested in a company. Most importantly, this includes the value of the common shares plus retained earnings and additional paid-in capital.

== History ==
Under the Basel III banking agreement large internationally active banks were required to hold a minimum of 4.5% of their risk-adjusted assets in common equity. This regulation became fully effective as of 1 Jan 2019.

In the United States, the Federal Reserve has decided that all banks will need to adhere to the standard, with the largest banks required to hold an extra buffer.

== See also ==
- Bank stress tests
- Balance sheet
- Capital requirement and reserve requirement
- Equity (finance)
- Tier 1 capital
- Tier 2 capital
