= Gross rent multiplier =

Real estate investment metric comparing property price to gross rental income

The gross rent multiplier (GRM) is a real estate valuation metric defined as the ratio of a property's purchase price to its annual gross rental income, before deducting expenses such as property tax, insurance, and utilities. It represents the number of years of gross rent required to recover the full purchase price of the property. For a prospective investor, a lower GRM indicates a relatively more attractive opportunity.

== Formula ==
$$\text{GRM} = \frac{\text{Property Price}}{\text{Annual Gross Rental Income}}$$

Example (monthly rents):

$$\text{GRM} = \frac{\$200{,}000}{\$750 \times 12} = 22.22$$

When calculated using annual rents rather than monthly rents, GRM values scale proportionally:

- 100 GRM (monthly basis) = 8.33 GRM (annual basis)
- An 8.33 annual GRM implies the gross rent will recover the purchase price in 8.33 years

Contemporary real estate practice increasingly quotes GRM on an annual rent basis. Either convention is valid provided the basis is stated consistently when comparing properties.

== When GRM is appropriate ==
The GRM is most useful for rapid comparison of investment properties when the following conditions hold:

- Operating expenses (property taxes, insurance, maintenance, utilities) are relatively uniform across comparable properties, either in absolute terms or as a consistent fraction of gross rental income
- Expense data is difficult to obtain or unreliable, making gross income a more practical starting point than net operating income
- A quick screening metric is needed before conducting detailed discounted cash flow (DCF) analysis

The GRM is less appropriate when expense structures differ significantly between properties, or when vacancy rates, tenant mix, or lease terms vary materially. In those cases, the capitalization rate or a full DCF model provides a more reliable basis for comparison.

== Relationship to cap rate and DCF ==
The capitalization rate (cap rate) is the net income equivalent of the GRM. Where GRM uses gross income, the cap rate uses net operating income (NOI):

$$\text{Cap Rate} = \frac{\text{NOI}}{\text{Property Price}}$$

The GRM and the cap rate are related through the multiplicative inverse: a property valued at a cap rate of 5.46% has a net income multiplier of approximately 18.3. The GRM is the gross income analogue of this net multiplier.

Both the GRM and the cap rate are single-period metrics. They express value as a snapshot of current income but do not account for:

- Future rent growth or decline
- Capital expenditure requirements
- Terminal value at disposition
- Time value of money

A more complete valuation framework is the multiperiod discounted cash flow (DCF) model, which captures total return across the full holding period. In practice, the cap rate and GRM are best understood as compressed representations of the more fundamental DCF calculation rather than independent drivers of value.

== GRM vs. gross income multiplier ==
The gross income multiplier (GIM) is functionally equivalent to the GRM but is sometimes calculated using effective gross income (EGI) — gross potential rent adjusted for vacancy and credit loss — rather than gross potential rent. When comparing properties using either metric, it is essential to confirm whether the multiple was derived from gross potential rent or effective gross income, as mixing the two bases produces misleading comparisons.

Metric	Income Basis	Expense Adjustment
GRM	Gross potential rent	None
GIM	Effective gross income (EGI)	Vacancy and credit loss deducted
Cap Rate	Net operating income (NOI)	All operating expenses deducted

== Limitations ==
The GRM does not account for differences in operating expense ratios between properties. Two properties with identical GRMs may have significantly different cap rates if one carries substantially higher taxes, insurance, or maintenance costs. Analysts therefore treat the GRM as a first-pass filter rather than a conclusive valuation tool.

Additional limitations include:

- Does not reflect leverage or debt service coverage ratio (DSCR)
- Cannot distinguish between stabilized and value-add properties
- Does not incorporate rent concessions, free rent periods, or tenant improvement allowances that reduce effective rent below stated gross rent

== See also ==
- Capitalization rate
- Net operating income
- Discounted cash flow
- Real estate valuation
- Real estate investing
- Effective gross income
