= Property =

Entity owned by a person or a group of people

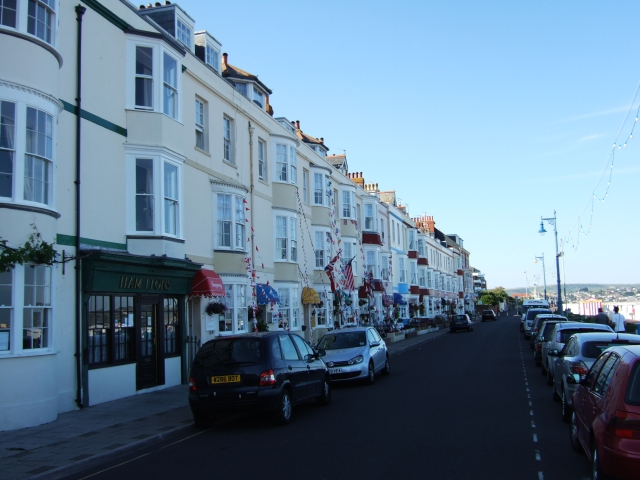
Buildings of shops, hotels, and residences are prevalent forms of property.

Property is a system of rights that gives people legal control of valuable things, and also refers to the valuable things themselves. Depending on the nature of the property, an owner of property may have the right to consume, alter, share, rent, sell, exchange, transfer, give away, or destroy it, or to exclude others from doing these things, as well as to perhaps abandon it; whereas regardless of the nature of the property, the owner thereof has the right to properly use it under the granted property rights.

In economics and political economy, there are four broad forms of property: private property, public property, collective property, and common property. Property may be jointly owned by more than one party equally or sometimes unequally, or according to simple or complex agreements; to distinguish ownership and easement from rent, there is an expectation that each party's will with regard to the property be clearly defined and unconditional.. The parties may expect their wills to be unanimous, or alternatively each may expect their own will to be sufficient when no opportunity for dispute exists.

In American law, the first Restatement defines property as anything, tangible or intangible, whereby a legal relationship between persons and the State enforces a possessory interest or legal title in that thing. This mediating relationship between individual, property, and State is called a property regime.

In sociology and anthropology, property is often defined as a relationship between two or more individuals and an object, in which at least one of these individuals holds a bundle of rights over the object. The distinction between collective and private property is regarded as confusion, since different individuals often hold differing rights over a single object.

Types of property include real property (the combination of land and any improvements to or on the ground), personal property (physical possessions belonging to a person), private property (property owned by legal persons, business entities or individual natural persons), public property (State-owned or publicly owned and available possessions) and intellectual property—including exclusive rights over artistic creations and inventions. However, the latter is not always widely recognized or enforced. An article of property may have physical and incorporeal parts. A title, or a right of ownership, establishes the relation between the property and other persons, assuring the owner the right to dispose of the property as the owner sees fit. The unqualified term "property" is often used to refer specifically to real property.

== Overview ==
Property is often defined by the code of the local sovereignty and protected wholly or – more usually, partially – by such entity, the owner being responsible for any remainder of protection. The standards of the proof concerning proofs of ownerships are also addressed by the code of the local sovereignty, and such entity plays a role accordingly, typically somewhat managerial. Some philosophers assert that property rights arise from social convention, while others find justifications for them in morality or in natural law.

Various scholarly disciplines (such as law, economics, anthropology or sociology) may treat the concept more systematically, but definitions vary, most particularly when involving contracts. Positive law defines such rights, and the judiciary can adjudicate and enforce property rights.

According to Adam Smith (1723–1790), the expectation of profit from "improving one's stock of capital" rests on private-property rights. Capitalism has as a central assumption that property rights encourage their holders to develop the property, generate wealth, and efficiently allocate resources based on the operation of markets. From this has evolved the modern conception of property as a right enforced by positive law, in the expectation that this will produce more wealth and better standards of living. However, Smith also expressed a very critical view of the effects of property laws on inequality:

Wherever there is a great property, there is great inequality … Civil government, so far as it is instituted for the security of property, is in reality instituted for the defense of the rich against the poor, or of those who have some property against those who have none at all.

In his 1881 text "The Common Law", Oliver Wendell Holmes describes property as having two fundamental aspects. The first, possession, can be defined as control over a resource based on the practical inability to contradict the ends of the possessor. The second title is the expectation that others will recognize rights to control resources, even when not in possession. He elaborates on the differences between these two concepts and proposes a history of how they came to be attached to persons, as opposed to families or entities such as the church.

- Classical liberalism subscribes to the labor theory of property. Its proponents hold that individuals each own their own life; it follows that one must acknowledge the products of that life and that those products can be traded in free exchange with others.

"Every man has a property in his person. This nobody has a right to, but himself." (John Locke, "Second Treatise on Civil Government", 1689)

"The reason why men enter into society is the preservation of their property." (John Locke, "Second Treatise on Civil Government", 1689)

"Life, liberty, and property do not exist because men have made laws. On the contrary, it was the fact that life, liberty, and property existed beforehand that caused men to make laws in the first place." (Frédéric Bastiat, The Law, 1850)

- Conservatism subscribes to the concept that freedom and property are closely linked - building on traditions of thought that property guarantees freedom or causes freedom. The more widespread the possession of the private property, conservatism propounds, the more stable and productive a state or nation is. Conservatives maintain that the economic leveling of property, especially of the forced kind, is not economic progress.

"Separate property from private possession and Leviathan becomes master of all... Upon the foundation of private property, great civilizations are built. The conservative acknowledges that the possession of property fixes certain duties upon the possessor; he accepts those moral and legal obligations cheerfully." (Russell Kirk, The Politics of Prudence, 1993)

- Socialism's fundamental principles center on a critique of this concept, stating (among other things) that the cost of defending property exceeds the returns from private property ownership and that, even when property rights encourage their holders to develop their property or generate wealth, they do so only for their benefit, which may not coincide with advantage to other people or society at large.
- Libertarian Socialism generally accepts property rights with a short abandonment period. In other words, a person must make (more-or-less) continuous use of the item or else lose ownership rights. This is usually referred to as "possession property" or "usufruct." Thus, in this usufruct system, absentee ownership is illegitimate, and workers own the machines or other equipment they work with.
- Communism argues that only common ownership of the means of production will assure the minimization of unequal or unjust outcomes and the maximization of benefits and that; therefore humans should abolish private ownership of capital (as opposed to property).

Both communism and some forms of socialism have also upheld the notion that private ownership of capital is inherently illegitimate. This argument centers on the idea that private ownership of capital always benefits one class over another, giving rise to domination through this privately owned capital. Communists do not oppose personal property that is "hard-won, self-acquired, self-earned" (as "The Communist Manifesto" puts it) by members of the proletariat. Both socialism and communism distinguish carefully between private ownership of capital (land, factories, resources, etc.) and private property (homes, material objects, and so forth).

=== Types of property ===
Most legal systems distinguish between different types of property, especially between land (immovable property, estate in land, real estate, real property) and all other forms of property—goods and chattels, movable property or personal property, including the value of legal tender if not the legal tender itself, as the manufacturer rather than the possessor might be the owner. They often distinguish tangible and intangible property. One categorization scheme specifies three species of property: land, improvements (immovable man-made things), and personal property (movable man-made things).

In common law, real property (immovable property) is the combination of interests in land and improvements thereto, and personal property is interest in movable property. Real property rights are rights relating to the land. These rights include ownership and usage. Owners can grant rights to persons and entities in the form of leases, licenses, and easements.

Throughout the last centuries of the second millennium, with the development of more complex theories of property, the concept of personal property had become divided into tangible property (such as cars and clothing) and intangible property (such as financial assets and related rights, including stocks and bonds; intellectual property, including patents, copyrights and trademarks; digital files; communication channels; and certain forms of identifier, including Internet domain names, some forms of network address, some forms of handle and again trademarks).

Treatment of intangible property is such that an article of property is, by law or otherwise by traditional conceptualization, subject to expiration even when inheritable, which is a key distinction from tangible property. Upon expiration, the property, if of the intellectual category, becomes a part of public domain, to be used by but not owned by anybody, and possibly used by more than one party simultaneously due to the inapplicability of scarcity to intellectual property. Whereas things such as communications channels and pairs of electromagnetic spectrum bands and signal transmission power can only be used by a single party at a time, or a single party in a divisible context, if owned or used. Thus far or usually, those are not considered property, or at least not private property, even though the party bearing right of exclusive use may transfer that right to another.

In many societies the human body is considered property of some kind or other. The question of the ownership and rights to one's body arise in general in the discussion of human rights, including the specific issues of slavery, conscription, rights of children under the age of majority, marriage, abortion, prostitution, drugs, euthanasia and organ donation.

== Related concepts ==
Of the following, only sale and at-will sharing involve no encumbrance.

		General meaning or description	Actor	Complementary notion	Complementary actor
Sale		Giving of property or ownership, but in exchange for money (units of some form of currency).	Seller	Buying	Buyer
Sharing		Allowing use of property, whether exclusive or as a joint operation.	Host	Accommodation	Guest
Sharing		Allowing use of property, whether exclusive or as a joint operation.	Host	Tenancy	Tenant
Sharing	Rent	Allowing limited and temporary but potentially renewable, exclusive use of property, but in exchange for compensation.	Renter	Tenancy	Tenant
Sharing	Rent	Allowing limited and temporary but potentially renewable, exclusive use of property, but in exchange for compensation.	Renter	Lease	Lessee
Sharing	Licensure	Allowing limited and temporary but potentially renewable, exclusive use of property, but in exchange for compensation.	Licensor	Lease	Lessee
Incorporeal division		Better known as nonpossessory interest or variation of the same notion, of which an instance may be given to another party, which is itself an incorporeal form of property. The particular interest may easily be destroyed once it and the property are owned by the same party.	—N/a		
Incorporeal division	Share	Aspect of property whereby ownership or equity of a particular portion of all property (stock) ever to be produced from it may be given to another party, which is itself an incorporeal form of property. The share may easily be destroyed once it and the property are owned by the same party.	—N/a		
Incorporeal division	Easement	Aspect of property whereby the right of a particular use of it may be given to another party, which is itself an incorporeal form of property. The easement or use-right may easily be destroyed once it and the property are owned by the same party.	—N/a		
Lien		Condition whereby unencumbered ownership of property is contingent upon completion of obligation; the property being collateral and associated with security interest in such an arrangement.	Lienor	Lieneeship	Lienee
Lien	Mortgage	Condition whereby while possession of property is achieved or retained, possession of it is contingent upon performance of obligation to somebody indebted to, and unencumbered ownership of it is contingent upon completion of obligation. The performance of obligation usually implies division of the principal into installments.	Mortgagor	Mortgage-brokering	Mortgage-broker
Lien	Pawn	Condition whereby while encumbered ownership of property is achieved or retained, encumbered ownership of it is contingent upon the performance of the obligation to somebody indebted to, and possession and unencumbered ownership of it is contingent upon completion of obligation.	Pledge	Pawnbrokering	Pawnbroker
Collision (Conflict)		Inability for property to be properly used or occupied due to scarcity or contradiction, the effective impossibility of sharing; possibly leading to eviction or the contrary, if the resolution is achieved rather than a stagnant condition; not necessarily involving or implying conscious dispute.	—N/a		
Security (Ward)		Degree of resistance to or protection from harm, use, or taking; the property and any mechanisms of protection of it being ward. (Alternately, in finance, the word as a countable noun refers to proof of ownership of investment instruments or as an uncountable noun to collateral.) There may be an involvement of obscurities, camouflage, barriers, armor, locks, alarms, booby traps, homing beacons, automated recorders, decoys, weaponry, or sentinels.: With land, moats, trenches, or entire buildings may be involved.; With buildings or certain forms of transport, turrets may be involved.; With information, encryption, steganography, or self-destruct capability may be involved.; With communications reliability, channel-hopping may be involved, like immunity or attempt thereat from jamming.; With devices of proprietary design, the respective compositions may be more mangled, more convoluted, and more complex than functionality warrants, hence confusing or obscure for protective purposes (though possibly to conceal unapproved copying instead).; With contractual rights, retentions of collateral and risks of jeopardy of collateral may be involved.	Securer	Protecteeship	Protectee
Security (Ward)			Warden	Ward	

=== Violation ===
	General meaning or description, the activities occurring in a way not beholden to the wishes of the owner	Committer
Trespassing	Use of physical and usually but not necessarily only immovable property or occupation of it.	Trespasser
Vandalism	Alteration, damage, or destruction of physical property or to the appearance of it.	Vandal
Infringement	(Incorporeal analogy to trespassing.) Alteration or duplication of an instance of intellectual property, and publication of the respectively alternate or duplicate; the sample being the information in a medium or a device for which a design plan predates and is the basis of fabrication.	Infringer
Violation	(Incorporeal analogy to trespassing.) Alteration or duplication of an instance of intellectual property, and publication of the respectively alternate or duplicate; the sample being the information in a medium or a device for which a design plan predates and is the basis of fabrication.	Violator
Theft	Taking of property in a way that excludes the owner from it, or functional alteration of the property ownership.	Thief
Piracy	The cognisant or incognisant reproduction and distribution of intellectual property and the possession of intellectual property that saw publication of its duplicates in the previous process.	Pirate
Piracy	Infringement with the effect of lost profits for the owner or infringement involving profit or personal gain.	Pirate
Plagiarism	Publication of a work, whether it is intellectual property (perhaps copyrighted) or not, whether it is in public domain or not, without credit being afforded to the creator, as though the work is original in publication.	Plagiarist

=== Miscellaneous action ===
	General meaning or description	Committer
Squatting	Occupation of property that is either unused and unkept or was abandoned, whether the property still has an owner. (If the property is owned and not left, then the squatting is trespassing if any usage not beholden to the wishes of the owner is done in the process.)	Squatter
Reverse engineering	Discovery of how a device works, whether it is an instance of intellectual property (perhaps patented) or not, whether it is in the public domain, and how to alter or duplicate it without access to or knowledge of the corresponding design plan.	Reverse engineer
Ghostwriting	Creation of a textual work, whereby another party is explicitly allowed to be credited as a creator in publication.	Ghostwriter

== Issues in property theory ==
=== Principle ===
The two major justifications are given for the original property, or the homestead principle, are effort and scarcity. John Locke emphasized effort, "mixing your labor" with an object, or clearing and cultivating virgin land. Benjamin Tucker preferred to look at the telos of property, i.e., what is the purpose of property? His answer: to solve the scarcity problem. Only when items are relatively scarce concerning people's desires, do they become property. For example, hunter-gatherers did not consider land to be property, since there was no shortage of land. Agrarian societies later made arable land property, as it was scarce. For something to be economically scarce, it must necessarily have the "exclusivity property"—that use by one person excludes others from using it. These two justifications lead to different conclusions on what can be property. Intellectual property—incorporeal things like ideas, plans, orderings and arrangements (musical compositions, novels, computer programs)—are generally considered valid property to those who support an effort justification, but invalid to those who support a scarcity justification, since the things don't have the exclusivity property (however, those who support a scarcity justification may still support other "intellectual property" laws such as Copyright, as long as these are a subject of contract instead of government arbitration). Thus even ardent propertarians may disagree about IP. By either standard, one's body is one's property.

From some anarchist points of view, the validity of property depends on whether the "property right" requires enforcement by the State. Different forms of "property" require different amounts of enforcement: intellectual property requires a great deal of state intervention to enforce, ownership of distant physical property requires quite a lot, ownership of carried objects requires very little. In contrast, requesting one's own body requires absolutely no state intervention. So some anarchists don't believe in property at all.

Many things have existed that did not have an owner, sometimes called the commons. The term "commons," however, is also often used to mean something entirely different: "general collective ownership"—i.e. common ownership. Also, the same term is sometimes used by statists to mean government-owned property that the general public is allowed to access (public property). Law in all societies has tended to reduce the number of things not having clear owners. Supporters of property rights argue that this enables better protection of scarce resources due to the tragedy of the commons. At the same time, critics say that it leads to the 'exploitation' of those resources for personal gain and that it hinders taking advantage of potential network effects. These arguments have differing validity for different types of "property"—things that are not scarce are, for instance, not subject to the tragedy of the commons. Some apparent critics advocate general collective ownership rather than ownerlessness.

Things that do not have owners include: ideas (except for intellectual property), seawater (which is, however, protected by anti-pollution laws), parts of the seafloor (see the United Nations Convention on the Law of the Sea for restrictions), gases in Earth's atmosphere, animals in the wild (although in most nations, animals are tied to the land. In the United States and Canada, wildlife is generally defined in statute as property of the State. This public ownership of wildlife is referred to as the North American Model of Wildlife Conservation and is based on The Public Trust Doctrine.), celestial bodies and outer space, and land in Antarctica.

The nature of children under the age of majority is another contested issue here. In ancient societies, children were generally considered the property of their parents. However, children in most modern communities theoretically own their bodies but are not regarded as competent to exercise their rights. Their parents or guardians are given most of the fundamental rights of control over them.

Questions regarding the nature of ownership of the body also come up in the issue of abortion, drugs, and euthanasia.

In many ancient legal systems (e.g., early Roman law), religious sites (e.g. temples) were considered property of the God or gods they were devoted to. However, religious pluralism makes it more convenient to have sacred sites owned by the spiritual body that runs them.

Intellectual property and air (airspace, no-fly zone, pollution laws, which can include tradable emissions rights) can be property in some senses of the word.

Ownership of land can be held separately from the ownership of rights over that land, including sporting rights, mineral rights, development rights, air rights, and such other rights as may be worth segregating from simple land ownership.

=== Ownership ===
Ownership laws may vary widely among countries depending on the nature of the property of interest (e.g., firearms, real property, personal property, animals). Persons can own property directly. In most societies legal entities, such as corporations, trusts and nations (or governments) own property.

In many countries women have limited access to property following restrictive inheritance and family laws, under which only men have actual or formal rights to own property.

In the Inca empire, the dead emperors, considered gods, still controlled property after death.

=== Government interference ===
In 17th-century England, the legal directive that nobody may enter a home (which in the 17th century would typically have been male-owned) unless by the owner's invitation or consent, was established as common law in Sir Edward Coke 's "Institutes of the Lawes of England". "For a man's house is his castle, et domus sua cuique est tutissimum refugium [and each man's home is his safest refuge]." It is the origin of the famous dictum, "an Englishman's home is his castle". The ruling enshrined into law what several English writers had espoused in the 16th century. Unlike the rest of Europe the British had a proclivity towards owning their own homes. British Prime Minister William Pitt, 1st Earl of Chatham defined the meaning of castle in 1763, "The poorest man may in his cottage bid defiance to all the forces of the crown. It may be frail – its roof may shake – the wind may blow through it – the storm may enter – the rain may enter – but the King of England cannot enter."

That principle was carried to the United States. Under U.S. law, the principal limitations on whether and the extent to which the State may interfere with property rights are set by the Constitution. The Takings clause requires that the government (whether State or federal—for the 14th Amendment's due process clause imposes the 5th Amendment's takings clause on state governments) may take private property only for a public purpose after exercising due process of law, and upon making "just compensation." If an interest is not deemed a "property" right or the conduct is merely an intentional tort, these limitations do not apply, and the doctrine of sovereign immunity precludes relief. Moreover, if the interference does not almost completely make the property valueless, the interference will not be deemed a taking but instead a mere regulation of use. On the other hand, some governmental regulations of property use have been deemed so severe that they have been considered "regulatory takings." Moreover, conduct is sometimes deemed only a nuisance, or another tort has been held a taking of property where the conduct was sufficiently persistent and severe.

== Theories ==
There exist many theories of property. One is the relatively rare first possession theory of property, where ownership of something is seen as justified simply by someone seizing something before someone else does. Perhaps one of the most popular is the natural rights definition of property rights as advanced by John Locke. Locke advanced the theory that God granted dominion over nature to man through Adam in the book of Genesis. Therefore, he theorized that when one mixes one's labor with nature, one gains a relationship with that part of nature with which the labor is mixed, subject to the limitation that there should be "enough, and as good, left in common for others." (see Lockean proviso)

In his encyclical letter Rerum novarum (1891), Pope Leo XIII wrote, "It is surely undeniable that, when a man engages in remunerative labor, the impelling reason and motive of his work is to obtain property, and after that to hold it as his very own."

Anthropology studies the diverse ownership systems, rights of use and transfer, and possession under the term "theories of property". As mentioned, western legal theory is based on the owner of property being a legal person. However, not all property systems are founded on this basis.

In every culture studied, ownership and possession are the subjects of custom and regulation, and "law" is where the term can meaningfully be applied. Many tribal cultures balance individual rights with the laws of collective groups: tribes, families, associations, and nations. For example, the 1839 Cherokee Constitution frames the issue in these terms:

Sec. 2. The lands of the Cherokee Nation shall remain common property. Still, the improvements made thereon, and in possession of the citizens respectively who made, or may rightfully own them: Provided, that the citizens of the Nation possessing the exclusive and indefeasible right to their improvements, as expressed in this article, shall possess no right or power to dispose of their improvements, in any manner whatever, to the United States, individual States, or individual citizens thereof; and that, whenever any citizen shall remove with his effects out of the limits of this Nation, and become a citizen of any other government, all his rights and privileges as a citizen of this Nation shall cease: Provided, nevertheless, That the National Council shall have power to re-admit, by law, to all the rights of citizenship, any such person or persons who may, at any time, desire to return to the Nation, on memorializing the National Council for such readmission.

Communal property systems describe ownership as belonging to the entire social and political unit. Common ownership in a hypothetical communist society is distinguished from primitive forms of common property that have existed throughout history, such as Communalism and primitive communism, in that communist common ownership is the outcome of social and technological developments leading to the elimination of material scarcity in society.

Corporate systems describe ownership as being attached to an identifiable group with an identifiable responsible individual. The Roman property law was based on such a corporate system. In a well-known paper that contributed to the creation of the field of law and economics in the late 1960s, the American scholar Harold Demsetz described how the concept of property rights makes social interactions easier:

In the world of Robinson Crusoe, property rights play no role. Property rights are an instrument of society and derive their significance from the fact that they help a man form those expectations which he can reasonably hold in his dealings with others. These expectations find expression in society's laws, customs, and more. An owner of property rights possesses the consent of fellowmen to allow him to act in particular ways. An owner expects the community to prevent others from interfering with his actions, provided that these actions are not prohibited in the specifications of his rights.

— Harold Demsetz (1967), "Toward a Theory of property Rights", The American Economic Review 57(2), p. 347.

Different societies may have other theories of property for differing types of ownership. For example, Pauline Peters argued that property systems are not isolable from the social fabric, and notions of property may not be stated as such but instead may be framed in negative terms: for example, the taboo system among Polynesian peoples.

== Property in philosophy ==
In medieval and Renaissance Europe the term "property" essentially referred to land. After much rethinking, land has come to be regarded as only a special case of the property genus. This rethinking was inspired by at least three broad features of early modern Europe: the surge of commerce, the breakdown of efforts to prohibit interest (then called "usury"), and the development of centralized national monarchies.

=== Ancient philosophy ===
Aristotle, in Politics, advocates "private property". He argues that self-interest leads to neglect of the commons.

Cicero held that there is no private property under natural law but only under human law. Seneca viewed property as only becoming necessary when men become avaricious. St. Ambrose later adopted this view and St. Augustine even derided heretics for complaining the Emperor could not confiscate property they had labored for.

=== Medieval philosophy ===
==== Thomas Aquinas (13th century) ====
The canon law Decretum Gratiani maintained that mere human law creates property, repeating the phrases used by St. Augustine. St. Thomas Aquinas agreed with regard to the private consumption of property but modified patristic theory in finding that the private possession of property is necessary. Thomas Aquinas concludes that, given certain detailed provisions,

- it is natural for man to possess external things
- it is lawful for a man to possess a thing as his own
- The essence of theft consists in taking another's thing secretly
- Theft and robbery are sins of different species, and robbery is a more grievous sin than theft
- theft is a sin; it is also a mortal sin
- it is, however, lawful to steal through stress of need:" in cases of need, all things are common property."

=== Modern philosophy ===
The principal writings of Thomas Hobbes appeared between 1640 and 1651—during and immediately following the war between forces loyal to King Charles I and those loyal to Parliament. In his own words, Hobbes' reflection began with the idea of "giving to every man his own," a phrase he drew from the writings of Cicero. But he wondered: How can anybody call anything his own?

A contemporary of Hobbes, James Harrington, reacted to the same tumult differently: he considered property natural but not inevitable. The author of "Oceana," he may have been the first political theorist to postulate that political power is a consequence, not the cause, of the distribution of property. He said that the worst possible situation is when the commoners have half a nation's property, with the crown and nobility holding the other half—a circumstance fraught with instability and violence. He suggested a much better situation (a stable republic) would exist once the commoners own most property.

Another member of the Hobbes/Harrington generation, Sir Robert Filmer, reached conclusions much like Hobbes', but through Biblical exegesis. Filmer said that the institution of kingship is analogous to that of fatherhood, that subjects are still, children, whether obedient or unruly and that property rights are akin to the household goods that a father may dole out among his children—his to take back and dispose of according to his pleasure.

In the following generation, John Locke sought to answer Filmer, creating a rationale for a balanced constitution in which the monarch had a part to play, but not an overwhelming part. Since Filmer's views essentially require that the Stuart family be uniquely descended from the patriarchs of the Bible, and even in the late 17th century, that was a difficult view to uphold, Locke attacked Filmer's views in his First Treatise on Government, freeing him to set out his own views in the Second Treatise on Civil Government. Therein, Locke imagined a pre-social world each of the unhappy residents which are willing to create a social contract because otherwise, "the enjoyment of the property he has in this state is very unsafe, very insecure," and therefore, the "great and chief end, therefore, of men's uniting into commonwealths, and putting themselves under government, is the preservation of their property." They would, he allowed, create a monarchy, but its task would be to execute the will of an elected legislature. "To this end" (to achieve the previously specified goal), he wrote, "it is that men give up all their natural power to the society they enter into, and the community put the Legislative power into such hands as they think fit, with this trust, that they shall be governed by declared laws, or else their peace, quiet, and property will still be at the same uncertainty as it was in the state of nature."

Even when it keeps to proper legislative form, Locke held that there are limits to what a government established by such a contract might rightly do.

"It cannot be supposed that [the hypothetical contractors] they should intend, had they a power so to do, to give anyone or more an absolute arbitrary power over their persons and estates, and put a force into the magistrate's hand to execute his unlimited will arbitrarily upon them; this were to put themselves into a worse condition than the State of nature, wherein they had a liberty to defend their right against the injuries of others, and were upon equal terms of force to maintain it, whether invaded by a single man or many in combination. Whereas by supposing they have given themselves up to the absolute arbitrary power and will of a legislator, they have disarmed themselves, and armed him to make a prey of them when he pleases..."

Both "persons" and "estates" are to be protected from the arbitrary power of any magistrate, including legislative power and will." In Lockean terms, depredations against an estate are just as plausible a justification for resistance and revolution as are those against persons. In neither case are subjects required to allow themselves to become prey. To explain the ownership of property, Locke advanced a labor theory of property.

David Hume's views on law and property were quite conservative. He did not believe in hypothetical contracts or the love of humanity in general and sought to ground politics upon actual human beings as one knows them. "In general," he wrote, "it may be affirmed that there is no such passion in the human mind, as the love of mankind, merely as such, independent of personal qualities, or services, or of relation to ourselves." Existing customs should not lightly be disregarded because they have come to be what they are due to human nature. With this endorsement of custom comes an endorsement of existing governments because he conceived of the two as complementary: "A regard for liberty, though a laudable passion, ought commonly to be subordinate to a reverence for established government." Therefore, Hume's view was that there are property rights because of and to the extent that the existing law, supported by social customs, secure them. He offered some practical home-spun advice on the general subject, though, as when he referred to avarice as "the spur of industry," and expressed concern about excessive levels of taxation, which "destroy industry, by engendering despair."

"Civil government, so far as it is instituted for the security of property, is, in reality, instituted for the defense of the rich against the poor, or of those who have property against those who have none at all."

— Adam Smith, The Wealth of Nations, 1776

"The property that every man has in his labour is the original foundation of all other property, so it is the most sacred and inviolable. The inheritance of a poor man lies in the strength and dexterity of his hands, and to hinder him from employing this strength and dexterity in what manner he thinks proper without injury to his neighbor, is a plain violation of this most sacred property. It is a manifest encroachment upon the just liberty of the workman and those who might be disposed to employ him. It hinders the one from working at what he thinks proper, so it hinders the others from employing whom they think proper. To judge whether he is fit to be employed may surely be trusted to the discretion of the employers whose interest it so much concerns. The affected anxiety of the law-giver lest they should employ an improper person is as impertinent as it is oppressive." — (Source: Adam Smith, The Wealth of Nations, 1776, Book I, Chapter X, Part II.)

By the mid 19th century, the industrial revolution had transformed England and the United States and had begun in France. As a result, the conventional conception of what constitutes property expanded beyond land to encompass scarce goods. In France, the revolution of the 1790s had led to large-scale confiscation of land formerly owned by the church and king. The restoration of the monarchy led to claims by those dispossessed to have their former lands returned.

Karl Marx notes that under Feudal Law, peasants were legally entitled to their land as the aristocracy was to its manors. Section VIII, "Primitive Accumulation" of Capital involves a critique of Liberal Theories of property rights. Marx cites several historical events in which large numbers of the peasantry were removed from their lands, then seized by the nobility. This seized land was then used for commercial ventures (sheep herding). Marx sees this "Primitive Accumulation" as integral to the creation of English Capitalism. This event created a sizeable un-landed class that had to work for wages to survive. Marx asserts that liberal theories of property are "idyllic" fairy tales that hide a violent historical process.

Charles Comte, in "Traité de la propriété" (1834), attempted to justify the legitimacy of private property in response to the Bourbon Restoration. According to David Hart, Comte had three main points: "firstly, that interference by the state over the centuries in property ownership has had dire consequences for justice as well as for economic productivity; secondly, that property is legitimate when it emerges in such a way as not to harm anyone; and thirdly, that historically some, but by no means all, property which has evolved has done so legitimately, with the implication that the present distribution of property is a complex mixture of legitimately and illegitimately held titles."

Comte, as Proudhon later did, rejected Roman legal tradition with its toleration of slavery. Instead, he posited a communal "national" property consisting of non-scarce goods, such as land in ancient hunter-gatherer societies. Since agriculture was so much more efficient than hunting and gathering, private property appropriated by someone for farming left remaining hunter-gatherers with more land per person and hence did not harm them. Thus this type of land appropriation did not violate the Lockean proviso – there was "still enough, and as good left." Later theorists would use Comte's analysis in response to the socialist critique of property.

In his 1840 treatise What is Property?, Pierre Proudhon answers with "Property is theft!". In natural resources, he sees two types of property, de jure property (legal title) and de facto property (physical possession), and argues that the former is illegitimate. Proudhon's conclusion is that "property, to be just and possible, must necessarily have equality for its condition." His analysis of the product of labor upon natural resources as property (usufruct) is more nuanced. He asserts that land itself cannot be property, yet it should be held by individual possessors as stewards of humanity, with the product of labor being the producer's property. Proudhon reasoned that any wealth gained without labor was stolen from those who labored to create that wealth. Even a voluntary contract to surrender the product of work to an employer was theft, according to Proudhon, since the controller of natural resources had no moral right to charge others for the use of that which he did not labor to create did not own. Proudhon's theory of property greatly influenced the budding socialist movement, inspiring anarchist theorists such as Mikhail Bakunin who modified Proudhon's ideas, as well as antagonizing theorists like Karl Marx.

Frédéric Bastiat 's main treatise on property can be found in his book "Economic Harmonies" (1850). In a radical departure from traditional property theory, he defines property, not as a physical object, but rather as a relationship between people concerning a thing. Thus, saying one owns a glass of water is merely verbal shorthand for "I may justly gift or trade this water to another person." In essence, what one owns is not the object but the object's value. By "value," Bastiat means "market value"; he emphasizes this is quite different from utility. "In our relations with one another, we are not owners of the utility of things, but their value, and value is the appraisal made of reciprocal services." Bastiat theorized that, as a result of technological progress and the division of labor, the stock of communal wealth increases over time; that the hours of work an unskilled laborer expends to buy e.g., 100 liters of wheat, decreases over time, thus amounting to "gratis" satisfaction. Thus, private property continually destroys itself, becoming transformed into communal wealth. The increasing proportion of communal wealth to private property results in a tendency toward equality of humanity. "Since the human race began in greatest poverty, that is, when there were the most obstacles to overcome, all that has been achieved from one era to the next is due to the spirit of property." This transformation of private property into the communal domain, Bastiat points out, does not imply that personal property will ever totally disappear. On the contrary, this is because man, as he progresses, continually invents new and more sophisticated needs and desires.

=== Contemporary views ===
Contemporary political thinkers who believe that natural persons enjoy rights to own property and enter into contracts espouse two views about John Locke. On the one hand, some admire Locke, such as William H. Hutt (1956), who praised Locke for laying down the "quintessence of individualism." On the other hand, those such as Richard Pipes regard Locke's arguments as weak and think that undue reliance thereon has weakened the cause of individualism in recent times. Pipes has written that Locke's work "marked a regression because it rested on the concept of Natural Law" rather than upon Harrington's sociological framework.

Hernando de Soto has argued that an essential characteristic of the capitalist market economy is the functioning state protection of property rights in a formal property system which records ownership and transactions. These property rights and the whole legal system of property make possible:

- Greater independence for individuals from local community arrangements to protect their assets
- Clear, provable, and protectable ownership
- The standardization and integration of property rules and property information in a country as a whole
- Increased trust arising from a greater certainty of punishment for cheating in economic transactions
- More formal and complex written statements of ownership that permit the more straightforward assumption of shared risk and ownership in companies, and insurance against the risk
- Greater availability of loans for new projects since more things can serve as collateral for the loans
- Easier access to and more reliable information regarding such things as credit history and the worth of assets
- Increased fungibility, standardization, and transferability of statements documenting the ownership of property, which paves the way for structures such as national markets for companies and the easy transportation of property through complex networks of individuals and other entities
- Greater protection of biodiversity due to minimizing of shifting agriculture practices

According to de Soto, all of the above enhance economic growth. Academics have criticized the capitalist frame through which property is viewed pointing to the fact that commodifying property or land by assigning it monetary value takes away from the traditional cultural heritage, particularly from first nation inhabitants. These academics point to the personal nature of property and its link to identity being irreconcilable with wealth creation that contemporary Western society subscribes to.

== See also ==
- Allemansrätten
- Anarchism
- Binary economics
- Buying agent
- Capitalism
- Communism
- Family patrimony
- Homestead principle
- Immovable property
- Inclusive Democracy
- International Property Rights Index
- Interpersonal relationship
- Labor theory of property
- Land (economics)
- Libertarianism
- Off plan
- Ownership society
- Personal property
- Propertarian
- Property is theft
- Property law
- Property rights (economics)
- Public liability
- Socialism
- Sovereignty
- Taxation as theft
- Unowned property
- Wealth

Property-giving (legal)

- Charity
- Essenes
- Gift
- Kibbutz
- Monasticism
- Tithe, Zakat (modern sense)

Property-taking (legal)

- Adverse possession
- Confiscation
- Eminent domain
- Fine of lands
- Jizya
- Nationalization
- Regulation
- Search and seizure
- Tariff
- Tax
- Turf and twig (historical)
- Tithe, Zakat (historical sense)
- RS 2477

Property-taking (illegal)

- Theft

== Bibliography ==
- Bastiat, Frédéric, 1850. Economic Harmonies. W. Hayden Boyers.
- Bastiat, Frédéric, 1850. "The Law", tr. Dean Russell.
- Bethell, Tom, 1998. "The Noblest Triumph: Property and Prosperity through the Ages." New York: St. Martin's Press.
- Blackstone, William, 1765–69. "Commentaries on the Laws of England", 4 vols. Oxford Univ. Press. Especially Books the Second and Third.
- De Soto, Hernando, 1989. "The Other Path". Harper & Row.
- De Soto, Hernando, and Francis Cheneval, 2006. Realizing Property Rights. Ruffer & Rub.
- Ellickson, Robert, 1993. ""Property in Land" (PDF). Archived from the original (PDF) on 2008-04-09. (6.40 MB)", Yale Law Journal 102: 1315–1400.
- Mckay, John P., 2004, "A History of World Societies". Boston: Houghton Mifflin Company
- Palda, Filip (2011) "Pareto's Republic and the New Science of Peace" 2011 chapters online. Published by Cooper-Wolfling. ISBN 978-0-9877880-0-9
- Pipes, Richard, 1999. "Property and Freedom". New York: Knopf Doubleday. ISBN 978-0-375-40498-6
