= Cash on cash return =

Real estate investing term

In real estate investing, the cash-on-cash return is the ratio of annual before-tax cash flow to the total amount of cash invested, expressed as a percentage.

$$\mbox{Cash-on-Cash Return} = \frac{\mbox{Annual Before-Tax Cash Flow}}{\mbox{Total Cash Invested}}$$

The cash-on-cash return, or "cash yield", is often used to evaluate the cash flow from income-producing assets, such as a rental property.

Generally considered a napkin test to quickly determine if the asset qualifies for further review and analysis, cash on cash analyses are often used by investors looking for properties where cash flow is paramount, however, some use it to determine if a property is undervalued, indicating instant equity in a property.

== Example ==
Suppose an investor purchases a $1,200,000 apartment complex with a $300,000 down payment. Each month, the cash flow from rentals, less expenses, is $5,000. Over the course of a year, the before-tax income would be $5,000 × 12 = $60,000, so the NOI (Net Operating Income)-on-cash return would be

$$\frac{\$\ \mbox{60,000}}{\$\ \mbox{300,000}}=0.20=20\%$$.

However, because the investor used debt to service a portion of the asset, they are required to make debt service payments and principal repayments in this scenario (I.E. mortgage payments). Because of this, the Cash-on-Cash return would be a lower figure which would be determined by dividing the NOI after all mortgage payment expenses were deducted from it, by the total cash invested.

For example: If the investor made total mortgage payments (principal+interest) of $2,000 a month in this scenario, then the Cash-on-Cash return on the investment would be as follows:

- $2,000 x 12 = $24,000
- $60,000 - $24,000 = $36,000

$\frac{\$\ \mbox{36,000}}{\$\ \mbox{300,000}}=0.12=12\%$.

== Limitations ==
- Because the calculation is based solely on before-tax cash flow relative to the amount of cash invested, it cannot take into account an individual investor's tax situation, the particulars of which may influence the desirability of the investment. However the investor can usually deduct enough Capital Cost Allowance to defer the taxes for a long time.
- The formula does not take into account any appreciation or depreciation. When some cash is a return of capital (ROC) it will falsely indicate a higher return, because ROC is not income.
- It does not account for other risks associated with the underlying property.
- It is essentially a simple interest calculation and ignores the effect of compounding interest. The implication for investors is that an investment with a lower nominal rate of compound interest may be superior, in the long run, to an investment with a higher cash-on-cash return.

It is possible to perform an after-tax Cash on Cash calculation, but accurate depictions of your adjusted taxable income are needed to correctly address how much tax payment is being saved through depreciation and other losses.

== See also ==
- Return of capital
- Capitalization rate
- Property Investment Calculator
- Equity Build Up Rate
