= Frieda Vizel =

American YouTuber, blogger and tour guide

- Born: Freidy Wertheimer; 1985 (age 40–41); New York, U.S.
- Occupations: Tour guide, YouTuber
- Website: friedavizel.com

Frieda Vizel (born 1985) is an American YouTuber, blogger and tour guide. Vizel offers tours of Williamsburg, a Hasidic neighborhood in the New York City borough of Brooklyn. Similarly, her YouTube focuses on informational videos about Hasidic life and customs.

== Early life ==
Vizel is of Polish and Hungarian-Jewish descent. Her paternal grandfather, a Polish Holocaust survivor, became Satmar after the Holocaust. Her father grew up in Williamsburg, Brooklyn, and holds Polish citizenship. Her mother also grew up in a Hasidic family. Her parents moved to upstate New York shortly before she was born.

Vizel was raised in Kiryas Joel, a Satmar Jewish community in New York. She was the fifth of 15 children in her family. She spoke Yiddish as her first language, and began learning English in first grade. Vizel struggled from a young age to fit in in the community, noting in 2022 that "the female space was very suffocating" to her. After completing 11th grade, and therefore school in Kiryas Joel, Vizel got a job with an insurance agency.

She became engaged at age 18, after meeting her fiancé once a few hours beforehand; the two married seven months later. She had her son when she was 20. As a young mother, Vizel began to buck against the community expectation of shaving her head after marriage, feeling it infringed on her personal autonomy and that it did not have a basis in scripture. She began to question other aspects of community life and custom following continued pressure from the community. She and her husband began watching films from outside the community, but he was unwilling to bend community rules farther, and refused when she asked him to move to Monsey, a less restrictive Satmar community.

When she was 25, she left the community with her son. In 2010, she divorced her husband, retaining custody of her son. The two moved to Monsey, later choosing to move to Brooklyn. Vizel has maintained relationships with her family.

== Career ==
In 2006, Vizel began writing a blog about Hasidic life under a pseudonym.

After leaving Kiryas Joel, Vizel obtained an undergraduate degree online. In 2011, Vizel became a student at Sarah Lawrence College in their women's history master's degree program.

Vizel has offered tours of Williamsburg professionally since 2013, and began giving tours full time in 2017. As of 2022, she was the only professionally licensed tour guide focusing on Williamsburg's Hasidic community. Her tours focus on "the Hasidic lifestyle and the reasons behind the community’s insular nature", and she purposefully tries to avoid critique or judgment of Hasidic culture. She begins her tours with a discussion of Hassidism's roots in Eastern Europe and the impact of the Holocaust on the community. Her tours also include visits to Hasidic-owned stores and delis.

In 2022, Vizel was interviewed in the first episode of the Shalom Hartman Institute's podcast Heretic in the House.

Vizel's YouTube channel offers explanations of Hasidic life and custom. She also films tours of Hasidic homes and interviews with Hasidim. Vizel has criticized media portrayals of Hasidic Jews, such as Netflix series Unorthodox, arguing they are sensationalist and ignore the complexities of Hasidic communities.

== Personal life ==
In 2017, Vizel moved to Flatbush, Brooklyn with her son. After leaving Kiryas Joel, Vizel joined another Orthodox community, but has since left Orthodox Judaism altogether. She also anglicized her birth name, Freidy, to Frieda. She has described the extent of her religious practices as doing "a little bit of shabbos".
