= Minimum lease payments =

Minimum lease payments are rental payments over the lease term including the amount of any bargain purchase option, premium, and any guaranteed residual value and excluding any rental relating to costs to be met by the lessor and any contingent rentals. Leased asset is depreciated in books of lessee over its useful life if lessee intends to avail bargain purchase option otherwise depreciable period will be lease term. Cost of leased asset in books of lessee for depreciation purposes will include bargain purchase option But will exclude the Guaranteed residual value as the case maybe.

Lessee will record the leased asset in his books at cost that will include present value of : lease payments, any directly attributable cost (incremental costs), bargain purchase option, guaranteed residual value, Dismentling cost.

Every lease payment made by lessee will include a portion of principal amount and accrued interest (if any).

== Treatment under modern lease accounting ==
The term "minimum lease payments" was commonly used in older lease accounting guidance, but modern lease standards generally focus on the measurement of lease payments, lease liabilities, and right-of-use assets. Under IFRS 16, a lessee recognises a right-of-use asset and a lease liability for leases with a term of more than 12 months, unless the underlying asset is of low value. Under U.S. GAAP, Accounting Standards Codification Topic 842 similarly requires lessees to recognise assets and liabilities for the rights and obligations created by leases.

Lease payments used to measure a lease liability generally include fixed payments, certain variable payments linked to an index or rate, amounts expected to be payable under residual value guarantees, and payments related to purchase, extension, or termination options when the relevant exercise conditions are met. The shift from minimum lease payments to lease-liability measurement reflects the broader move toward recognising most lease obligations on the balance sheet.
