= No-go zone =

no-go zone may refer to:

- A no-go area, a region where the ruling authorities have lost control and are unable to enforce the rule of law
- In real estate investing, suburbs or localities considered unsuitable for investment due to poor growth prospects, oversupply, or unfavorable development conditions; a usage prominent in Australian property investment commentary
- Areas where fishing is made illegal due to overfishing
- Protected areas for the preservation of environmental, biological, or historical value
- A free-fire zone, in U.S. military parlance
