= Off-plan property =

Property before a structure has been constructed upon it

Off-plan property is a property before a structure has been constructed upon it. Pre-constructions are usually marketed to real estate developers and to early adopters as developments so that the purchaser can secure more favorable finance terms from their lenders.

Property investors or property speculators purchase off-plan property with the aim of making substantial capital gains. This financial return may occur because developers who sell off-plan property often offer financial incentives or discounts to early adopters. In addition, there may be an opportunity for capital growth in a rising market and with a development cycle of typically 12–24 months.

Off-plan property is typically deemed attractive if there is a high level of infrastructure in the immediate area such as a new university or expresses roads, either already built or due to be built within the next few years.

Properties sold before they are constructed or completed are referred to as pre-sale properties or pre-sales in Canada. In Malaysia & Singapore, these properties are colloquially known as ‘new launches’.

== Advantages of buying off-plan ==
In a rapidly rising real estate economics housing market, buying off-plan enables investors and homebuyers to buy a property at a lower price than if they wait for the construction of their chosen property to commence or when it eventually is completed. In addition, buying off-plan may be the only way to get a property with a specific location or set of features as the choice may be limited once construction starts or finishes.

== Risks of buying off-plan ==
Buying a property off-plan, whether to use as a home or as an investment, incurs more risks than buying a property that has already been built.

1. If property values start to fall before construction is completed, the financing house may reduce the value of the loan or even deny financing, particularly if the buyer is buying the property as an investment rather than as a home. The buyer may be contractually obliged to buy the property at the original price and so must make up the shortfall from other sources or risk being sued if the buyer pulls out and the promoter sells the property at a lower price.
2. The constructor may go out of business before construction of the property is completed and the buyer may not be able to recover the monies advanced. There have been many cases of this happening in Spain, as the construction sector has been particularly hard hit by Spain's recession. Today, new-build property developments in Spain are more likely to be backed by bank guarantees (aval bancarios) that protect buyers from a builder going bankrupt.
3. During 2015 media attention in NSW, Australia exposed a loophole in state legislation that allowed developers to back out of an off-the-plan buying contract at the final hour. Dubbed the "sunset clawback" the practice involves developers taking buyers' initial deposit and holding it for a significant length of time while construction is carried out. Then, when the project is almost finished they rescind the deal and sell the property off at a higher price. Following the introduction of section 66ZL to the Conveyancing Act 1919 (NSW) purchasers now have some protection.
4. Another issue with the off-plan property is that the finished property may not meet the buyer's original expectations, either because of subjective reasons or because of material defects. A new-build home in the UK may contain up to 80 small defects.
