= Capitalization rate =

Real estate valuation measure

Capitalization rate (or "cap rate") is a real estate valuation measure used to compare different real estate investments. Although there are many variations, the cap rate is generally calculated as the ratio between the annual rental income produced by a real estate asset to its current market value. Most variations depend on the definition of the annual rental income and whether it is gross or net of annual costs, and whether the annual rental income is the actual amount received (initial yields), or the potential rental income that could be received if the asset was optimally rented (ERV yield).

== Basic formula ==
The rate is calculated in a simple fashion as follows:

$\mbox{Capitalization Rate} = \frac{\mbox{annual net operating income}}{\mbox{current value}}$

Some investors may calculate the cap rate differently.

In instances where the purchase or market value is unknown, investors can determine the capitalization rate using a different equation based upon historical risk premiums, as follows:

$\mbox{Capitalization Rate} = \frac{\mbox{risk free rate}+\mbox{historical real estate risk premium}-\mbox{expected net operating income growth rate}}{1-\frac{\mbox{annual capital expenditures}}\mbox{net operating income}}$

== Explanatory examples ==
For example, if a building is purchased for $1,000,000 sale price and it produces $100,000 in positive net operating income (the amount left over after fixed costs and variable costs are subtracted from gross lease income) during one year, then:

- $100,000/ $1,000,000 = 0.10 = 10%

The property building's capitalization rate is 10% percent, or in other words, one-tenth of the building's cost is paid by the net proceeds earned in the year.

If the owner bought the building twenty years ago for $200,000 that is now worth $400,000, his cap rate is:

- $100,000/ $400,000 = 0.25 = 25%.

The investor must take into account the opportunity cost of keeping their money tied up in this investment. By keeping this building, they are losing the opportunity of investing $400,000 (by selling the building at its market value and investing the proceeds).

For that reason, the current value of the investment, not the actual initial investment, should be used in the cap rate calculation. Most real estate transactions are financed using borrowed capital, such as mortgage loans.

Thus, for the owner of the building who bought it twenty years ago for $200,000, the real cap rate is twenty-five percent, not fifty percent, and they have $400,000 invested, not $200,000.

As another example of why the current value should be used, consider the case of a building that is given away (as an inheritance or charitable gift). The new owner divides the annual net income by the initial cost, say,

- income/cost = $100,000/ 0 → UNDEFINED

Anybody who invests any amount of money at an undefined rate of return very quickly has an undefined percent return on his investment.

From this, we see that as the value of an asset increases, the amount of income it produces should also increase (at the same rate), in order to maintain the cap rate.

Capitalization rates are an indirect measure of how fast an investment will pay for itself. In the example above, the purchased building will be fully capitalized (pay for itself) after ten years (100% divided by 10%). If the capitalization rate were 5%, the payback period would be twenty years.

Note that a real estate appraisal in the U.S. uses net operating income. Cash flow equals net operating income minus debt service. Where sufficiently detailed information is not available, the capitalization rate will be derived or estimated from net operating income to determine cost, value or required annual income.

An investor views his money as a "capital asset". As such, he expects his money to produce more money. Taking into account risk and how much interest is available on investments in other assets, an investor arrives at a personal rate of return he expects from his money. This is the cap rate he expects. If an apartment building is offered to him for $100,000, and he expects to make at least 8 percent on his real estate investments, then he would multiply the $100,000 investment by 8% and determine that if the apartments will generate $8,000, or more, a year, after operating expenses, then the apartment building is a viable investment to pursue.

== Use for valuation ==
In real estate investment, real property is often valued according to projected capitalization rates used as investment criteria. This is done by algebraic manipulation of the formula below:

- Capital Cost (asset price) = (Net Operating Income)/( Capitalization Rate)

For example, in valuing the projected sale price of an apartment building that produced a net operating income of $10,000 last year, if we set a projected capitalization rate at 7%, then the asset value (or the price paid to own it) is $142,857 (= $10,000/ .07).

This real estate appraisal method using the formula directly above is known as direct capitalization or capitalization rate valuation and is commonly used for valuing income generating property.

One advantage of capitalization rate valuation is that it is separate from a "market-comparables" approach to an appraisal (which compares 3 valuations: what other similar properties have sold for based on a comparison of physical, location and economic characteristics, actual replacement cost to re-build the structure in addition to the cost of the land and capitalization rates). Given the inefficiency of real estate markets, multiple approaches are generally preferred when valuing a real estate asset. Capitalization rates for similar properties, and particularly for "pure" income properties, are usually compared to ensure that estimated revenue is being properly valued.

=== Cash flow defined ===
The capitalization rate is calculated using a measure of cash flow called net operating income (NOI), not net income. Generally, NOI is defined as income (earnings) before depreciation and interest expenses:

- NOI = (Net income) − (operating expenses)

i.e., tax write-offs. depreciation, and mortgage interest are not factored into NOI; whereas:

- Levered Pre-Tax Cash Flow = NOI − (Debt service)

Note that one distinction for real estate properties is that operating expenses include property taxes, as such provisions are part of the business model.

Moreover, the annual debt service is the sum of a property's interest burden and principal amortization.

Depreciation in the tax and accounting sense is excluded from the valuation of the asset, because it does not directly affect the cash generated by the asset. To arrive at a more careful and realistic definition, however, estimated annual maintenance expenses or capital expenditures will be included in the non-interest expenses.

Although NOI is the generally accepted figure used for calculating cap rates (financing and depreciation are ignored), this is often referred to under various terms, including simply income.

== Use-case of cap rates ==
Capitalization rates are a tool for investors to use for estimating the value of a property based on its net operating income (NOI). For example, if a real estate investment provides $160,000 a year in NOI and similar properties have sold based on 8% cap rates, the subject property can be roughly valued at $2,000,000 because $160,000 divided by 8% (0.08) equals $2,000,000. A comparatively higher cap rate for a property would indicate greater risk associated with the investment (decreasing demand for the product, and the corresponding value), and a comparatively lower cap rate for a property might indicate less risk (increased demand for the product). Some factors considered in assessing risk include creditworthiness of a tenant, term of lease, quality and location of property, and general volatility of the market.

== Factors of determination ==
Cap rates are determined by three major factors; the opportunity cost of capital, growth expectations, and risk.

Commercial real estate investments compete with other assets (e.g. stocks and bonds) for investment dollars. If the opportunity cost of capital is too high, investors will use their capital to purchase other assets and the resulting decreased demand will drive prices down and cap rates up. If the inverse is true, cap rates will be driven down by the increased demand stemming from lower opportunity cost of capital.

The primary source of income in commercial real estate is rent. Rental rates are driven by a variety of supply and demand factors which make up a separate market for rentable space. As investors consider an acquisition, they must project future movements of this market as it relates to the specific asset. If the space market is expected to yield future increases in rental rates, investors will pay a higher price for the current income stream, pushing the cap rate down. If the space market projects a weak outlook, investors will want to pay less, and cap rates will rise.

Being a simplified rate of return measure, cap rates are subject to the same risk/return trade-off as other measures. In short, cap rates move in tandem with risk, real or perceived. While risk aversion varies from person to person, generally, investors are willing to pay more for less risky assets. As such, assets with less risk will carry lower cap rates than assets with higher risk.

== Reversionary ==
Property values based on capitalization rates are calculated on an "in-place" or "passing rent" basis, i.e. given the rental income generated from current tenancy agreements. In addition, a valuer also provides an Estimated Rental Value (ERV). The ERV states the valuer's opinion as to the open market rent which could reasonably be expected to be achieved on the subject property at the time of valuation.

The difference between the in-place rent and the ERV is the reversionary value of the property. For example, with passing rent of $160,000, and an ERV of $200,000, the property is $40,000 reversionary. Holding the valuers cap rate constant at 8%, we could consider the property as having a current value of $2,000,000 based on passing rent, or $2,500,000 based on ERV.

Finally, if the passing rent payable on a property is equivalent to its ERV, it is said to be "Rack Rented".

== Change in asset value ==
The cap rate only recognizes the cash flow a real estate investment produces and not the change in value of the property.

To get the unlevered rate of return on an investment, the real estate investor must add (or subtract) the percentage increase or decrease from the cap rate. For example, a property with a cap rate of 8%, which is projected to rise in value by 2%, delivers a 10% overall rate of return. The actual realised rate of return will depend on the amount of borrowed funds, or leverage, used to purchase the asset.

The most common metric used to quantify the percentage of leverage used to finance a real estate investment is the loan to value ratio (LTV), which compares the total loan amount to the appraised property value.

In the commercial real estate (CRE) market, the typically maximum LTV ratio around 75%.

== Historical trends ==
According to a national survey conducted by CBRE in early 2021, typical cap rates in the US varied across geographical regions and urban market, but generally ranged between 4.5% and 6.5% for urban office properties, between 6.5% and 8.0% for suburban office properties, and between 3.5 and 5.0% for multifamily housing properties. Typical cap rates for industrial properties showed a somewhat greater range, from 2.5% to 6.0%. According to the same survey, cap rates for retail properties in early 2021 typically ranged from 5.0 to 7.0%.

The National Council of Real Estate Investment Fiduciaries (NCREIF) in a Sept 30, 2007 report reported that for the prior year, for all properties income return was 5.7% and the appreciation return was 11.1%.

A Wall Street Journal report using data from Real Capital Analytics and Federal Reserve showed that from the beginning of 2001 to end of 2007, the cap rate for offices dropped from about 10% to 5.5%, and for apartments from about 8.5% to 6%. At the peak of the real estate bubble in 2006 and 2007, some deals were done at even lower rates: for instance, New York City's Stuyvesant Town and Peter Cooper Village apartment buildings sold at a cap rate of 3.1% based on highly optimistic assumptions. Most deals at these low rates used a great deal of leverage in an attempt to lift equity returns, generating negative cashflows and refinancing difficulties.

As U.S. real estate sale prices have declined faster than rents due to the economic crisis, cap rates have returned to higher levels: as of December 2009, to 8.8% for office buildings in central business districts and 7.36% for apartment buildings.

== See also ==
- Internal rate of return
- Property investment calculator
- Real estate investing
- Real estate investment trust (REIT)
- Yield (finance)
