= Protest paradigm =

Media unfavorably reporting on protests

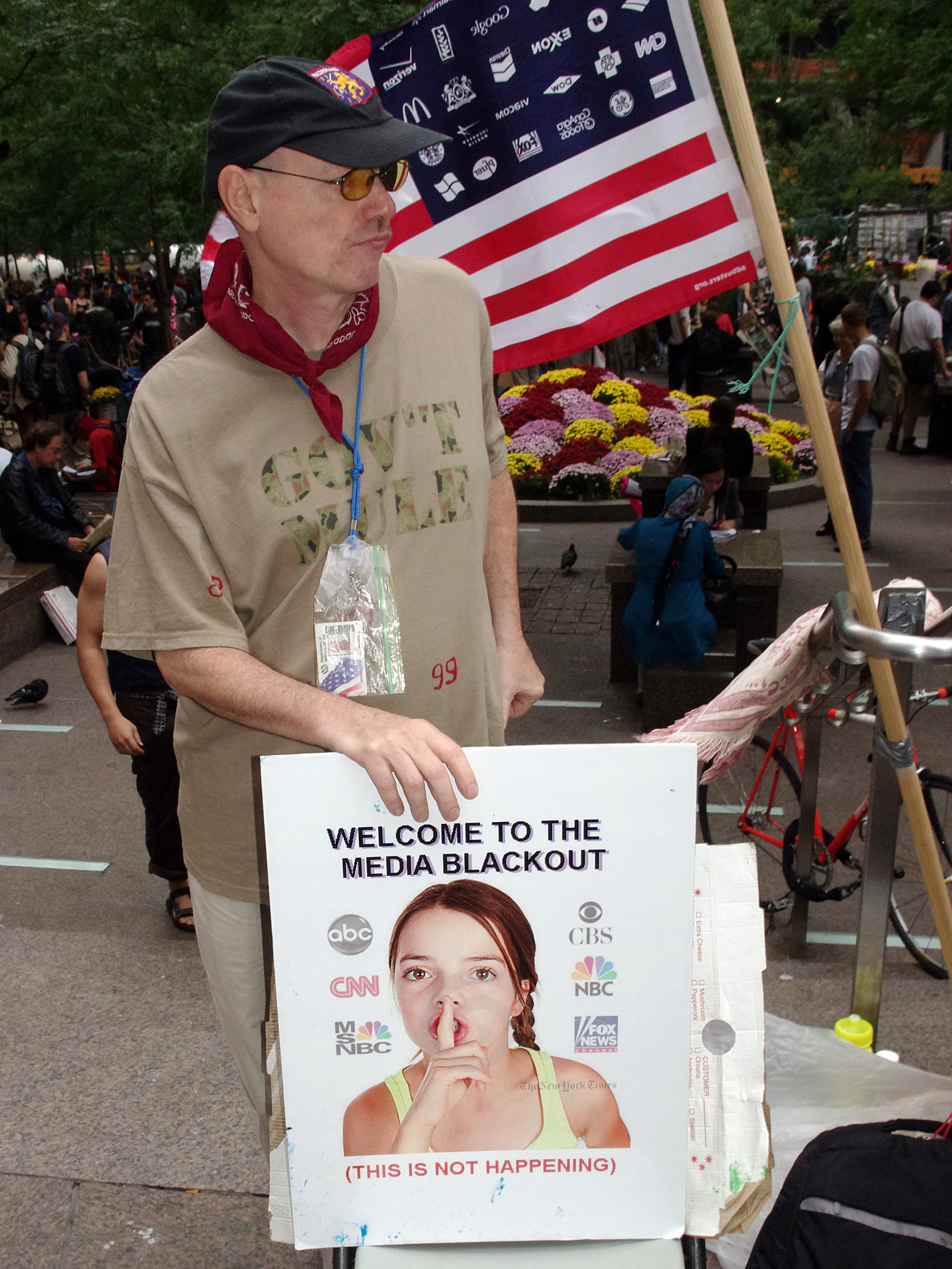
Protester holds sign accusing mainstream media outlets of refusing to cover the Occupy Wall Street protests.

The protest paradigm is a set of propagandistic news coverage patterns common in the mainstream media that delegitimizes, downplays, and unfavorably represents protesters. Outlets that use the paradigm often fail to cover nonviolent protests altogether or favor "pro-establishment" narratives when they do. The paradigm is theorized by scholars to be largely driven by ad revenue incentives in countries with a commercial media model and by partisan politics. It is more prevalent in the United States than in many other countries.

== Characteristics ==
The primary characteristics of paradigm, according to the model, include the following:

- Narrative framing: When news outlets frame protesters under a pre-existing narrative, such as by using the "criminals," "riot," or "carnival" narratives.
- Reliance on authorities: When news outlets over-rely on official sources, statements, and definitions, such as by treating police statements as definitive without balancing against statements from protesters.
- No public support: When news outlets compare public opinion polling against issues advocated by protesters or draw attention to low turnout, making protesters look like an "isolated minority."
- Delegitimization: When news outlets fail to explain the meaning and context of protest actions in order to delegitimize them, such as by giving no mention to the protest's goals and downplaying what it will realistically accomplish.
- Demonization: When news outlets exaggerate threats and focus disproportionately on the negative consequences of protests, such the effects of traffic congestion caused by a march.
- Omission: When news outlets fail to report on protests unless they engage in violent "newsworthy" conflicts, or only cover the most extreme aspects of a protest while omitting the peaceful majority.

== Driving forces ==
According to the Herman-Chomsky propaganda model, the reason commercial media systems "prioritize privileged groups over the minoritized" is largely because media outlets overwhelmingly favor advertisement-based models for generating revenue. Because revenue generation in media outlets is driven by ads, media outlets are incentivized to promote news cycle narratives that are likely to be perceived positively by "affluent" audiences, who are more likely to purchase ads compared with "down-scale" audiences.

Narratives in news cycles are usually pro-establishment when affluent individuals feel threatened and more progressive when goals of affluent individuals align with the objectives of a protest. For example, according to the propaganda model, the reason why there was negative press coverage during the Occupy Wall Street protests was because affluent individuals felt threatened by how the protests opposed economic inequality, so in order to appeal to their affluent audiences, mainstream media outlets such as The New York Times, The Boston Globe, and USA Today portrayed these protests negatively. However, according to a professor who studied the protest paradigm, when a movement is less likely to harm affluent individuals, it is less likely to be reported on negatively, such as during the Great American Boycott protests which received positive press from the Los Angeles Times largely because the protests aligned with the interests of the "wealthy elite in terms of meeting their needs for a large labor force to staff businesses and provide residential services."

According to the propaganda model, media outlets that do not tailor narratives toward affluent audiences tend to make less money than those who do, often resulting in outlets that do not follow the protest paradigm being driven out of the mainstream. Consequently, non-mainstream media outlets are more likely than mainstream outlets to give positive news coverage to protests. News outlets in the mainstream are also more likely to follow the protest paradigm in countries with a commercial media model.

In issues with a partisan divide, a driving factor of the protest paradigm in the US has been found by studies to be the political party with which a media outlet aligns, often leading to use of the paradigm to discredit protests aligned with opposing political views.

== Factors ==
Sociologists Edwin Amenta, Neal Caren and Weijun Yuwan identified two dimensions of news coverage: substance (low- or high-depth of coverage of protester action and demands) and sentiment (favorable or unfavorable framing).

Four types of news coverage
	Unfavorable	Favorable
High substance	Hard news "Police issue repeated warnings to protesters violating campus space rule 123"	Good news "Students picket on campus to protest Senate Bill 123, police threaten arrest"
Low substance	Bad news "Controversial demonstrations are harmful to campus atmosphere"	Soft news "Protesters appear on campus"

=== Good news ===
Good news in the US is more likely to occur when journalists cover engagement in bipartisan electoral politics. Good news is also more likely when journalists engage "deeply and frequently with a community," and scholars claim that student journalism and non-mainstream media outlets tend to do this better than mainstream media outlets.

=== Bad news, hard news, and soft news ===
Bad news coverage is more likely when protesters engage in violence or when protesters are investigated or charged with crimes; hard news coverage is more likely when there are labor strikes; and soft news coverage is more likely when covering civic action or third party candidates in electoral politics. The more radical a protest group is, the more likely they are to receive bad or hard news coverage. Bad and hard news is also more likely when protests are critical of media coverage.

News outlets often focus on how protests violate social norms, such as through drawing attention to protesters who dress in unusual ways, violate laws, or hold minority views in public opinion polling. Outlets also often draw attention to the idea that protesters who violate the status quo are "politically deviant."

Some scholars argue mainstream media framing of violent protests in a negative way without examining whether violence is acceptable on a case-by-case basis undermines the idea that violence is in some cases a morally legitimate action against oppressive systems. Othersargue the protest paradigm "weakens the influence of social protest in public opinion," making the general public perceive them as "illegitimate troublemakers," wasting their time, and "a threat to social order."

=== Violent and nonviolent protests ===
The type of coverage a nonviolent protest receives depends significantly on the issue being covered. Nonviolent protests are less likely to receive any news coverage at all because they are often deemed "not newsworthy," and one study found a high correlation between the number of arrests at Occupy Wall Street and the number of New York Times stories per week.

As a result of how nonviolent protests often receive little news coverage, protesters are more likely to engage in violence in order to secure media attention, thereby endangering themselves. For example, the Women Against Pornography movement in Minneapolis was largely ignored until protesters "ransacked an adult bookstore," anarchists in Minneapolis only received attention after demolishing a TV set and smashing a Marine recruiting station's windows, and the 1999 Seattle WTO protests only received national coverage after protesters engaged in street violence with riot police. When news coverage emerges after nonviolent protests turn violent, it is usually in the form of bad or hard news and often focuses on details of the conflict rather than the issues being advocated by protesters.

=== Political alignment ===
When good news explains "the goals and background of a protest" in order to legitimize and humanize protesters, those in the US with conservative political beliefs tend to perceive such news as less credible, whereas those with liberal political beliefs tend to perceive such news as more credible.

The protest paradigm is more likely to be utilized in politically conservative newspapers. For example, right-wing media outlets are more likely to invoke the protest paradigm than left-wing outlets regarding Black Lives Matter protests in order to discredit the movement.

=== Different countries ===
The mainstream media is more likely in the US than in other countries to "delegitimize coverage of protests that relate to racism or colonialism," whereas countries like China and India are less likely to do so. US media was also more likely to use the protest paradigm than United Kingdom media when covering the Iraq war protests. US media is more likely than the Belgian press to use the protest paradigm.

== Examples ==
=== United States ===
==== Tea Party protests ====
Eric Alterman, writing in 2011 for the Center for American Progress, contrasted 2009 Tea Party protests with coverage of Occupy Wall Street, finding that the Tea Party received more favorable press coverage, despite enjoying far lower levels of public support and much smaller protest turnouts.

==== Occupy Wall Street ====
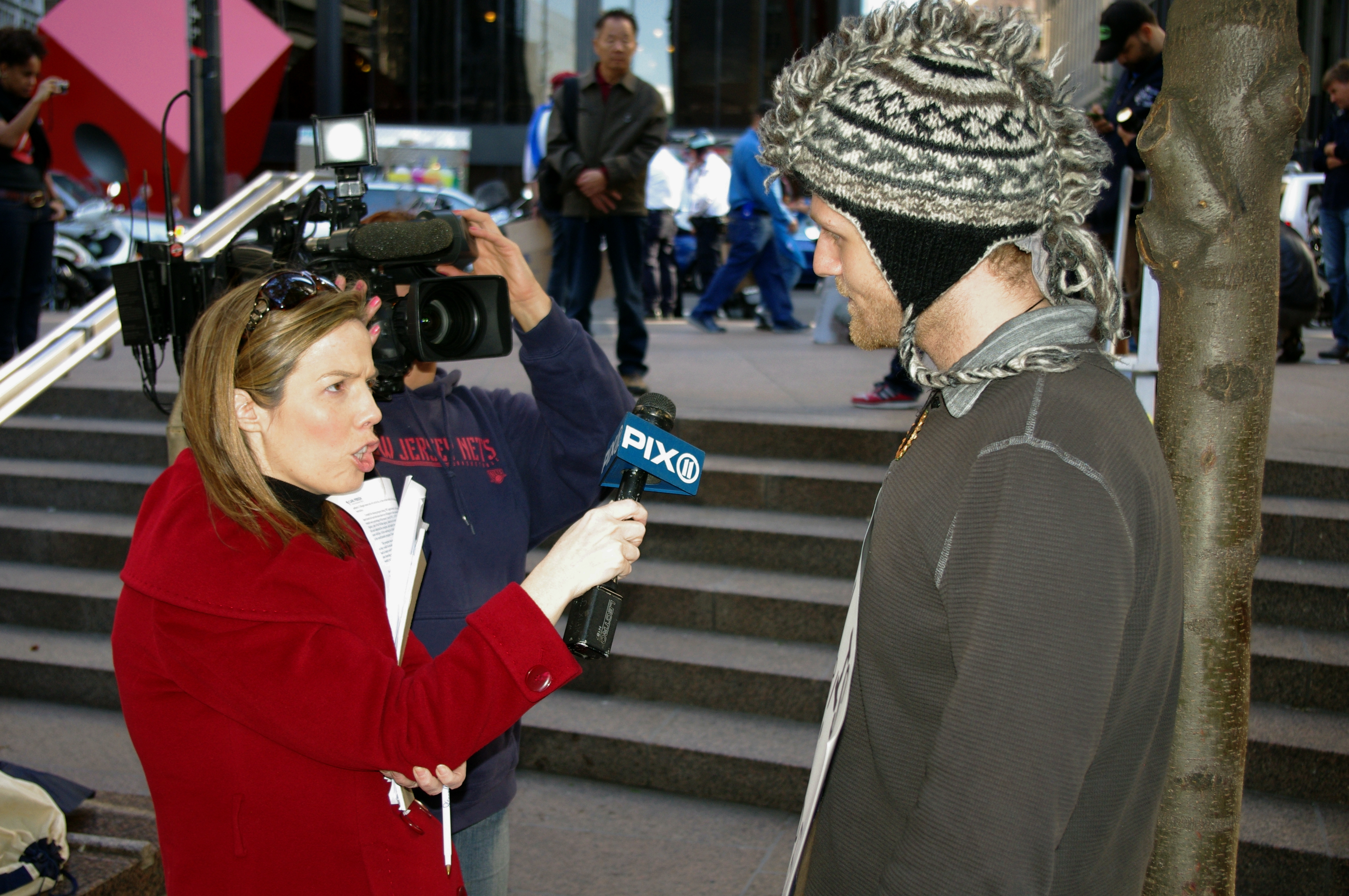
WPIX reporter interviews Occupy Wall Street protester.

Occupy Wall Street (O.W.S.) was a left-wing populist and progressive movement against economic inequality, capitalism, corporate greed, big finance, and the influence of money in politics. It began in Zuccotti Park, located in New York City's Financial District, and lasted for fifty-nine days—from September 17 to November 15, 2011.

A study found that five marginalization devices account for 66% of the variability in tone of mainstream media coverage of OWS (in order from most to least important): public disapproval, negative impact, show, ineffective goals, and lawlessness. Another study found that while mainstream media characterized OWS as "lackluster," "confusing," and using a dismissive tone, non-mainstream news sources were more likely to emphasize "the strength and diversity of its protesters and demonstrators." A third study found news coverage peaked during conflict between police and protesters and that there were periods of public disinterest between each conflict.

Specific examples

Kaibin Xu of Temple University gives several examples of the protest paradigm in various newspapers:

- USA Today invoked the protest paradigm in multiple articles, including one (now syndicated to ABC News) titled "Wall Street rallies become new brand of tourism," where they characterized OWS as a "carnival," downplayed its turnout, and extensively quoted a passerby who implied the movement was out of touch and unrealistic. (Note: USA Today: The park's carnival atmosphere, complete with balloons and bongos, has sometimes seemed to attract as many media and passersby as actual protesters. [...] Meanwhile, visitor Lewis is entertained — if not convinced — by Occupy Wall Street's message. Interrupting Steyert's harangue comparing the current U.S. movement to recent protests in Cairo, she tells him, "You can't equate a dictator who tortured people and shut down democracy with what's happening here." "They're not very specific in their demands, are they?" Lewis asks with a bemused smile. But on this sunny Sunday in New York, the protesters' earnestness is enough for her. [End of article.])
- Ginia Bellafante of The New York Times wrote an article titled "Gunning for Wall Street, With Faulty Aim" which, among other NYT articles, invoked the protest paradigm, characterizing OWS as a "carnival," drawing attention to low initial turnout, and extensively quoting a Wall Street trader who made condescending remarks about protesters. (Note: Ginia Bellafante: "I've been waiting for this my whole life," Ms. Tikka, 37, told me. "This", presumably was the opportunity to air societal grievances as carnival. Occupy Wall Street, a diffuse and leaderless convocation of activists against greed, corporate influence, gross social inequality and other nasty byproducts of wayward capitalism not easily extinguishable by street theater, had hoped to see many thousands join its protest and encampment, which began Sept. 17. According to the group, 2,000 marched on the first day; news outlets estimated that the number was closer to several hundred. [...] One day, a trader on the floor of the New York Stock Exchange, Adam Sarzen, a decade or so older than many of the protesters, came to Zuccotti Park seemingly just to shake his head. "Look at these kids, sitting here with their Apple computers," he said. "Apple, one of the biggest monopolies in the world. It trades at $400 a share. Do they even know that?" [End of article.])

Joanna Weiss of The Boston Globe invoked the protest paradigm in an article titled "The right way to get heard" in which she characterized OWS as a "circus," said "too many Americans have jobs" for OWS to be realistic, and advocated Elizabeth Warren as a better alternative to the movement. (Note: Joanna Weiss: This is the problem with overstated expectations, and with confusing high emotion with effectiveness. The protesters' stated goal was to turn Wall Street into Tahrir Square, but too many Americans do have jobs to make an Arab-Spring-style uprising even possible. It's hard to take a protest fully seriously when it looks more like a circus – some participants seem to have taken a chute straight from Burning Man – and when it's organized by a Canadian magazine and a computer-hacking group. (Also, organizers first declared that they would draw 20,000 protesters, but only 1,000 showed up. That's not a media conspiracy. It's math.) All of which explains why, when it comes to channeling liberal rage – or liberal sarcasm, which sometimes works just as well – Elizabeth Warren has a much better shot. Indeed, in a race that's getting national attention, she may have found the perfect medium for her corporate-accountability message.)

==== Black Lives Matter protests ====
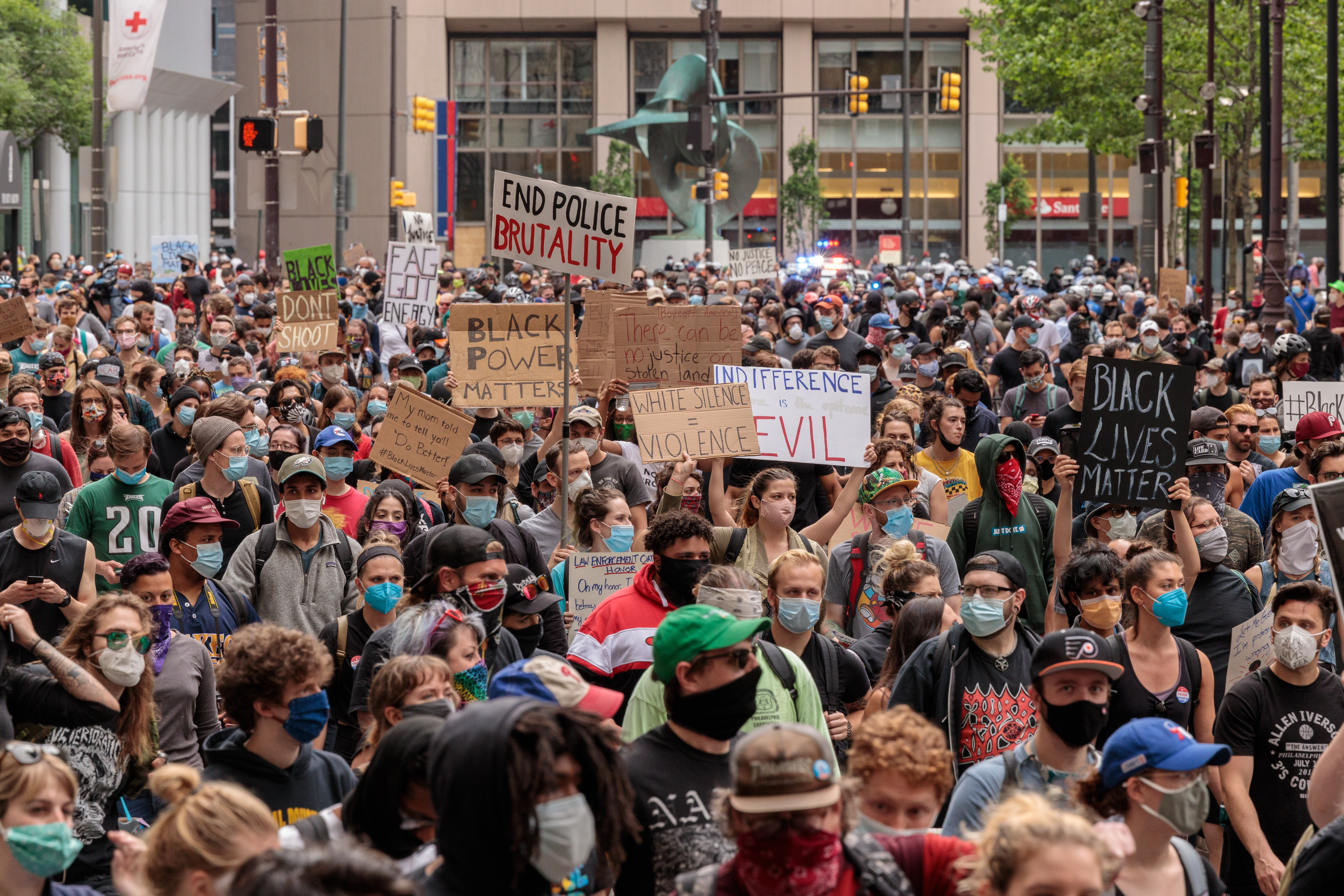
Overhead view of George Floyd protests

Black Lives Matter (BLM) is a decentralized political and social movement that aims to highlight racism, discrimination and racial inequality experienced by Black people in the United States, and to promote anti-racism. Its primary concerns are police brutality and racially motivated violence against Black people. The movement began in response to the killings of Trayvon Martin, Michael Brown, Eric Garner, and Rekia Boyd, among others. BLM and its related organizations typically advocate for various policy changes related to Black liberation and criminal justice reform. While there are organizations that label themselves "Black Lives Matter", such as the Black Lives Matter Global Network Foundation, the overall movement predates those, and is a decentralized network with no formal hierarchy. As of 2021, there are about 40 chapters in the United States and Canada. The slogan "Black Lives Matter" itself has not been trademarked by any group.

Protests, riots, and demonstrations against police brutality began in Minneapolis in the United States on May 26, 2020 as reactions to the murder of George Floyd, a 46-year-old unarmed African American man, by city police during an arrest. They spread nationally and internationally. Veteran officer Derek Chauvin was recorded as kneeling on Floyd's neck for 9 minutes and 29 seconds; Floyd complained of not being able to breathe, but three other officers looked on and prevented passersby from intervening. Chauvin and the other three officers involved were fired and later arrested. In April 2021, Chauvin was found guilty of second-degree murder, third-degree murder, and second-degree manslaughter. In June 2021, Chauvin was sentenced to 22 1/2 years in prison.

Studies examined the amount of times different news outlets used the word "riot" to describe BLM protests (which were overwhelmingly peaceful) and found a partisan divide: left-wing outlets such as CNN and MSNBC used the term "riot" to describe BLM 0.46 times and 0.24 times per story respectively, whereas right-wing outlets like Fox News used the term 1.15 times per story. Studies found a similar divide among the same news sources when examining the use of the word "rioters" to describe BLM protesters and when examining positive versus negative framing of BLM protests.

Another study rated news organizations by how likely they were to characterize the movement as riots instead of protests; in order from most to least, these were Fox News, The Washington Post, Wall Street Journal, New York Times, CNN, New York Post, MSNBC, and Al Jazeera. It also found that among articles written by these news outlets, between 2% (Fox News) and 7% (Al Jazeera) of paragraphs mentioned police brutality, between 10% (Fox News) and 35% (The Washington Post) of paragraphs mentioned racial elements (like the protests being anti-racist), and between 4% (Al Jazeera) and 19% (Fox News) of paragraphs mentioned Donald Trump's response.

One study found that Associated Press, CNN, and Fox News frequently engaged in the protest paradigm, whereas MSNBC produced less coverage overall but was more legitimizing.

A report by multiple groups including the Annenberg School at the University of Pennsylvania found that among three newspapers (Minneapolis Star-Tribune, the Louisville Courier-Journal, and the Philadelphia Inquirer), police sources were more common than community-based sources; dehumanizing language such as "suspect," "juvenile," and "offender" were used to portray civilians targeted by police; protests were often framed as threats to public order; police violence was described with "distancing" language such as by describing officer force as an "officer-involved shooting"; outlets did not make a lacking connection between police violence and police accountability; and the rallying cry "defund the police" (used frequently by protesters) received little explanation in terms of its policy implications.

Even though conservative outlets were more likely to engage in the protest paradigm, both liberal and conservative outlets engaged in the protest paradigm, such as by disproportionately focusing on violent demonstrations even though they were overwhelmingly peaceful. Studies have indicated this has contributed to a "decline in public support for the BLM movement," especially among the white population.

==== Gaza war protests ====
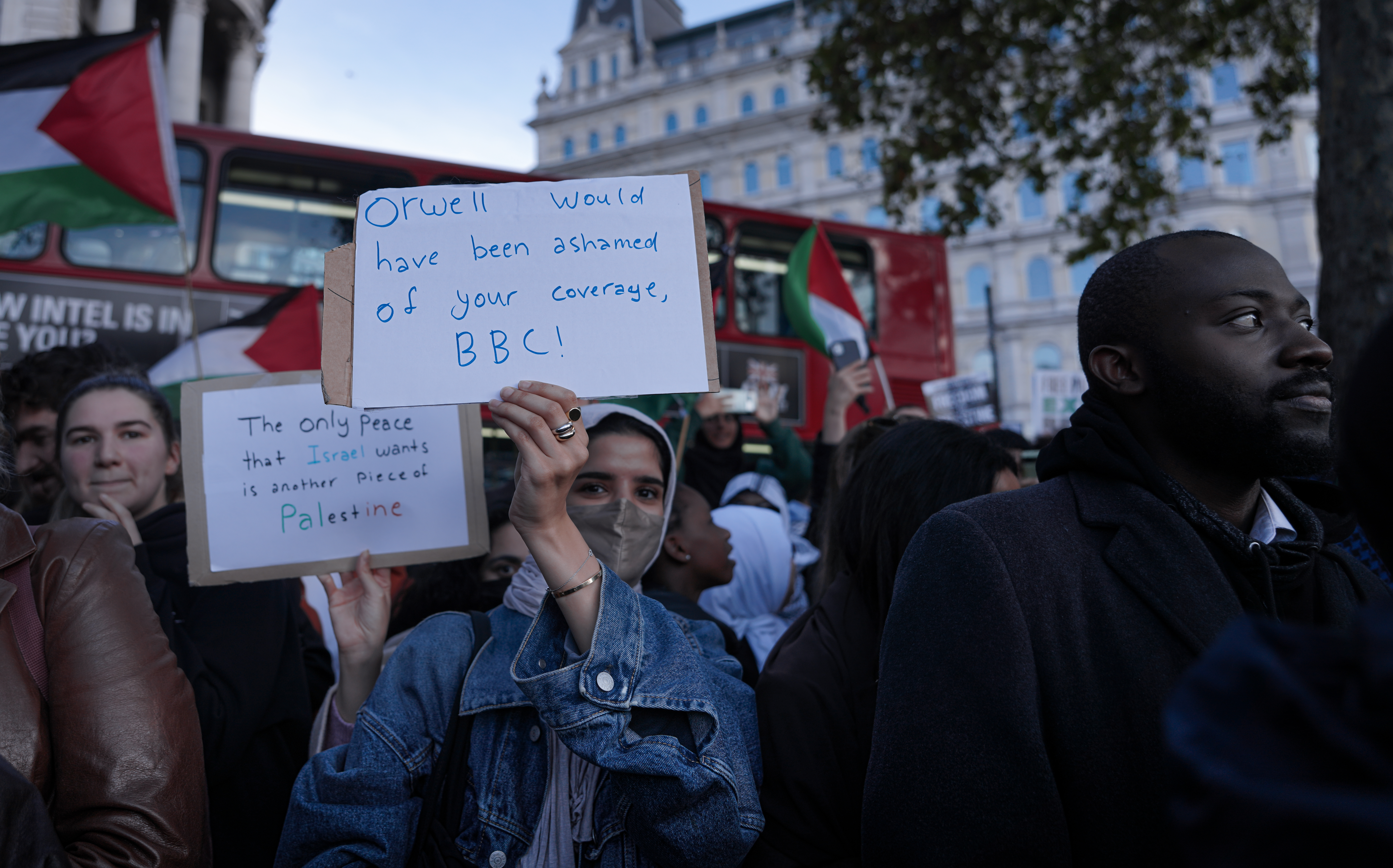
Protester holds sign accusing BBC of being Orwellian over coverage of the Gaza war.

The Gaza war has sparked protests, demonstrations, and vigils around the world. These protests focused on a variety of issues related to the conflict, including demands for a ceasefire, an end to the Israeli blockade and occupation, return of Israeli hostages, protesting war crimes, ending US support for Israel and providing humanitarian aid to Gaza. Since the war began on 7 October 2023, the death toll has exceeded 70,000.

According to Danielle K. Brown of Michigan State University in an article called "'Protest Paradigm' Shows What’s Wrong with Media Coverage of Student Activism", the protesters are, in the words of one protester, focused on "uplifting the voices of Gazans, of Palestinians facing genocide." She claims core elements in nearly all Gaza war protests include "grievances, demands, disruption, confrontation and spectacle," but that confrontation and spectacle are covered extensively by media outlets whereas grievances and demands are neglected. She also claims official statements are much more commonly cited than those protesters.

=== Serbia ===
During the 2024–present Serbian anti-corruption protests, SNS-aligned media outlets such as RTS, Pink, and TV Informer covered the ongoing anti-corruption protests in a negative light, including false claims that the protests were backed by Kosovo.

=== International ===
==== Greta Thunberg ====
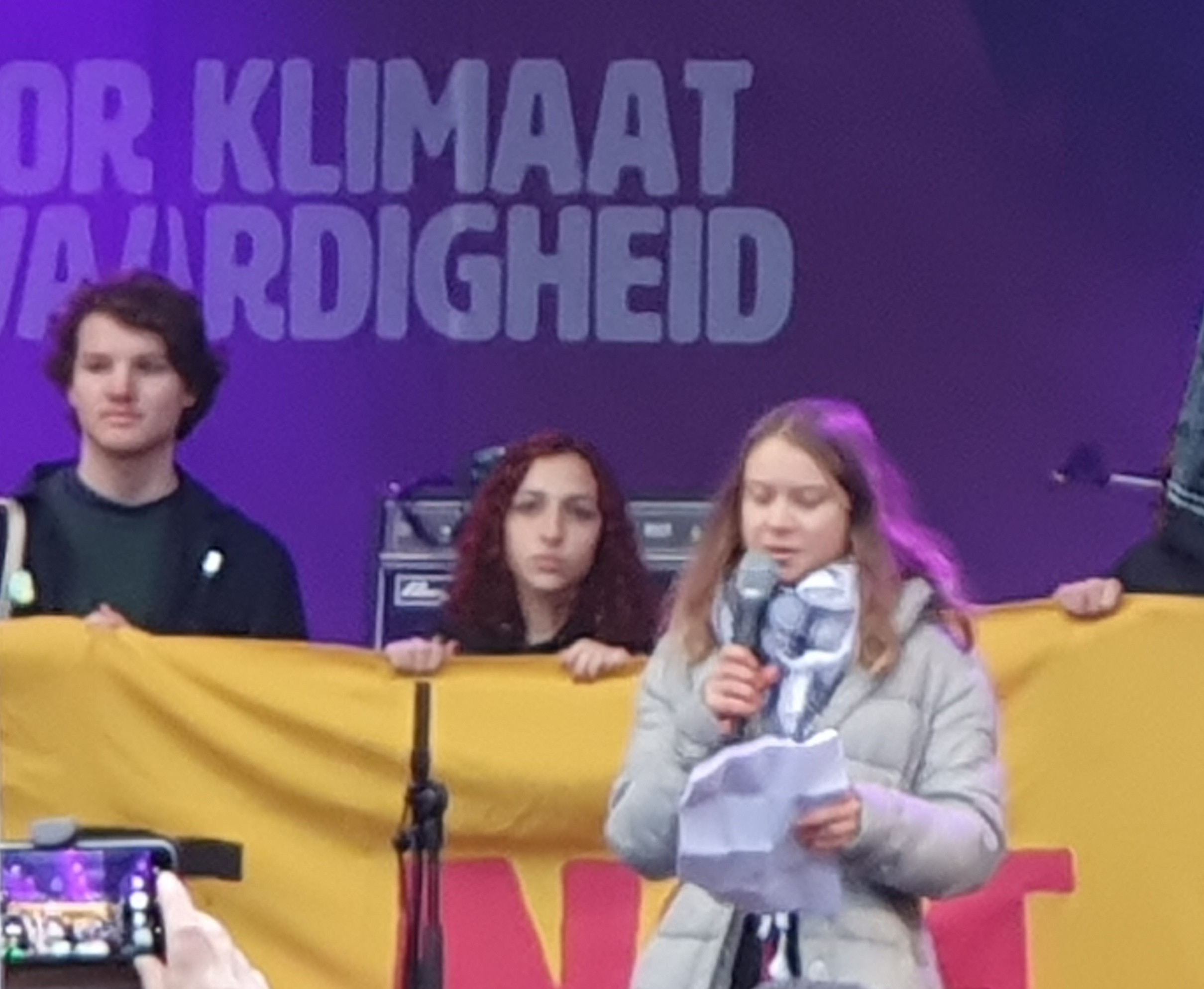
Thunberg wearing a keffiyeh in solidarity with Palestine at an event in Amsterdam in 2023

Greta Tintin Eleonora Ernman Thunberg (Note: Swedish: [ˈɡrêːta ˈtʉ̂ːnbærj]) (born 3 January 2003) is a Swedish activist known for pressuring governments to address climate change and social issues. She gained global attention in 2018, at age 15, after starting a solo school strike outside the Swedish parliament, which inspired the worldwide Fridays for Future movement.

Multiple media outlets have engaged in personal attacks against Thunberg. Scott Walsman wrote in Scientific American that Thunberg's detractors have "launched personal attacks," "bash [her] autism," and "increasingly rely on ad hominem attacks to blunt her influence." Writing in The Guardian, Aditya Chakrabortty said that columnists including Brendan O'Neill, Toby Young, the blog Guido Fawkes, as well as Helen Dale and Rod Liddle at The Spectator and The Sunday Times, had been making "ugly personal attacks" on Thunberg. According to Jakob Guhl, a researcher for the Institute for Strategic Dialogue, Germany's right-wing populist party Alternative for Germany (AfD) has attacked Thunberg "in fairly vicious ways."

== See also ==
- Propaganda
  - Propaganda model
  - Propaganda techniques
  - Propaganda in the United States
- Mass media
- Media blackout
- Media bias in the United States
- Mainstream media
- Yellow journalism
- Sensationalism
