= Murders of Haile Kifer and Nicholas Brady =

2012 murders in Little Falls, Minnesota

- Location of Little Falls within the state of Minnesota
- Location: Little Falls, Minnesota, U.S.
- Date: November 22, 2012; 13 years ago
- Attack type: Double-murder, child murder, execution-style murder, shooting
- Weapons: High Standard Double Nine Convertible .22-caliber revolver; Ruger Mini-14
- Deaths: 2
- Victims: Haile Kifer, aged 18; Nicholas Brady, aged 17
- Perpetrator: Byron David Smith
- Verdict: Guilty on all counts
- Convictions: Premeditated first-degree murder (2 counts); Second-degree murder (2 counts)
- Sentence: Life imprisonment without the possibility of parole

The murders of Haile Kifer and Nicholas Brady occurred on Thanksgiving Day of 2012, when Haile Kifer, 18, and her cousin, Nicholas Brady, 17, broke into the home of 64-year-old Byron David Smith in Little Falls, Minnesota, in the United States. Smith shot the teens separately 10 minutes apart as they entered the basement where he was, later stating to police he was worried about them being armed. After already shooting them once, he repeatedly taunted them while they were injured and also as he shot them both until they were dead. He did not report that he had killed Kifer and Brady until the day after the murders, keeping their bodies in his basement. On April 29, 2014, he was found guilty of two counts of premeditated first-degree murder. He was sentenced to life in prison without the possibility of parole.

The case sparked debate over the "castle doctrine", which allows homeowners to defend their homes with lethal force. The prosecution alleged that Smith's actions and a recording he made himself while the incidents were unfolding showed premeditation (lying in wait) and that he used excessive force after having neutralized the threat. He was convicted by a jury after three hours of deliberation and sentenced to life in prison.

== Background ==
Smith (born June 11, 1948) was retired from the U.S. State Department. He was never married and lived alone. His brother described him as a retired security engineering officer.

Smith claimed at trial that prior to the murders he had been burglarized at least half a dozen times over the preceding few months. He had reported only one previous burglary to police, and investigators found evidence of only two previous burglaries (one of which occurred in his detached garage and of which he appeared to have no knowledge when it was brought up by police). Among the items stolen were four thousand dollars in cash, his father's POW watch, coins from a collection, and a chainsaw. Smith began routinely wearing a holster with a loaded gun inside his home, as well as stashing bottles of water and granola bars in his basement.

== Murders ==
On November 22, 2012, Smith drove his vehicle down the road, parking it in front of a neighbor's home. About an hour later, Kifer and Brady broke into Smith's home. Video surveillance captured the teens casing the property prior to the break-in.

By his own account to police, Smith had been visiting neighbors when he saw Kifer, whom he suspected was responsible for the burglaries, driving past his home. He commented that he needed to get ready for her and went back to his home. Upon entering his home, Smith turned on a recording device he owned. He removed the light bulbs from the ceiling lights and positioned himself in a chair that was obscured from view. He heard the window upstairs break and Brady climb in (captured on audio). Smith then waited in silence for 12 minutes, until Brady began to descend into the basement. Smith shot Brady twice on the stairs, and once in the head after he fell to the bottom of the stairs. Smith then made taunting remarks to Brady's body, wrapped it in a tarp and dragged him into another room. He went upstairs, and 10 to 15 minutes later, he ran back down into the basement, reloaded his weapon and took up his previous position in the obscured chair. Minutes later, Kifer entered the home and could be heard calling her cousin's name. As she made her way down the stairs, Smith shot her. Wounded, she fell down the stairs, and Smith can be heard on the recording sarcastically saying "Oh, sorry about that", followed by Kifer saying "Oh, my God" very quickly; Smith shot her again multiple times in the torso—in the midst of which she screams. Smith yells "You're dying!" in response, and shoots her once again, next to her left eye. He repeatedly called her derogatory names and then dragged her into the other room, tossing her body on top of her cousin's, and shot her one final time under the chin, murdering her. Audio and video of the events were recorded by Smith's security system.

An autopsy report showed that Brady had been shot three times, and Kifer had been shot six times.

== Investigation ==
The deaths were not immediately reported to police. Smith waited until the next day to notify police of the shootings. Morrison County Sheriff Michel Wetzel has acknowledged that Brady and Kifer were there to burglarize Smith's residence. Brady's sister claimed he stole drugs from her home on August 28, a case that was still under investigation at the time of Brady's killing. Evidence recovered from the car driven by Brady was linked to a burglary of the residence of a retired teacher the night before he and Kifer were killed by Smith.

Smith's statements to police describe delivering the fatal shots to the heads of both teens after he had shot them on the stairs and they lay wounded on the basement floor. In his statement, Smith said that Kifer had let out a short laugh after she fell down the stairs, saying: "If you're trying to shoot somebody and they laugh at you, you go again." The audiotape did not record Kifer laughing; instead, she cries "Oh, my God!" very rapidly in fear. In police interviews Smith acknowledged "firing more shots than I needed to" and that he fired "a good clean finishing shot" into Kifer's head.

== Castle doctrine debate ==
Legal analysts have stated that the initial shootings most likely would have been justified under Minnesota's laws, but that the subsequent shots were not justified once any threat had been removed. Sheriff Wetzel said that "The law doesn't permit you to execute somebody once a threat is gone." Hamline University School of Law professor Joseph Olson said, "I think the first shot is justified. After the person is no longer a threat because they're seriously wounded, the application of self-defense is over."

In addition to his home surveillance system, Smith also recorded at least six hours of audio on a digital recorder in the basement of the residence. Prior to the break-in, he is heard saying "In your left eye" and "I realize I don't have an appointment but I would like to see one of the lawyers here". The prosecution noted that Kifer was later shot in the left eye by Smith and alleged that the other statement was a rehearsal of what he would say after the shooting—an indication that he knew he would soon need an attorney.

Following the shootings, Smith made a number of statements, including: "I am not a bleeding heart liberal. I felt like I was cleaning up a mess—not like spilled food, not like vomit, not even like... not even like diarrhea—the worst mess possible. And I was stuck with it ... in some tiny little respect. I was doing my civic duty. If the law enforcement system couldn't handle it, I had to do it. I had to do it. The law system couldn't handle her and it fell into my lap and she dropped her problem in my lap ... and she threw her own problem in my face. And I had to clean it up." Smith's recorded statements, the evidence indicating he had planned the shootings, along with the excessive number of shots fired, led to Smith being charged with second-degree murder. Smith was initially charged with two counts of second-degree murder; however, in April 2013, he was indicted on two counts of first-degree murder. Bail was later set at US$50,000 (equivalent to $69,107 in 2025), which Smith posted.

Hamline law professor emeritus Joseph Daly commented that the laws surrounding the case were dividing the Little Falls community. Daly said: "In some states, somebody breaks into your home you are allowed to shoot them dead. Period". He pointed to other states, such as Florida, having a "stand your ground" law but Minnesota has what is known as a reasonable person doctrine. Arguing that summary execution is reasonable, Daly said: "If a reasonable person would see if you are in fear of great bodily harm or death. That's our statute. It comes down to, what would a reasonable person see in this situation for Mr. Smith?"

== Trial ==
On April 21, 2014, Smith's jury trial commenced in Morrison County. Smith was represented by attorneys Steven J. Meshbesher and Adam T. Johnson. On April 29, 2014, Smith was found guilty on two counts of first-degree murder with premeditation and on two counts of second-degree murder after three hours of jury deliberations. He was immediately sentenced to life in prison without the possibility of parole. The audio recordings were named by the jurors as the biggest influence on their decision. Wes Hatlestad, one of 12 jurors, following the trial said: "That was the most damning piece of evidence in my mind. That audio recording of the actual killings and the audio recording of Mr. Smith's interview immediately after his arrest ... pretty much convinced me that we were dealing with a deranged individual."

== Law ==
Under Minnesota state statute, "reasonable force may be used upon or toward the person of another without the other's consent when the following circumstances exist or the actor reasonably believes them to exist...when used by any person in lawful possession of real or personal property ... in resisting ... unlawful interference with such property." Unlawful interference with Smith's property was ended by Smith's initial shots, which disabled Brady and then Kifer; these shots constituted reasonable force. The jury believed the actions Smith undertook to kill Brady and Kifer after disabling them were not an act of reasonable force to resist unlawful interference.

Another state statute states: "The intentional taking of the life of another is not authorized ... except when necessary in resisting or preventing an offense which the actor reasonably believes exposes the actor or another to great bodily harm or death, or preventing the commission of a felony in the actor's place of abode." The jury found that the potential offense which exposed Smith to great bodily harm was ended by the disabling shots to Brady and Kifer; the potential felonies on Smith's abode were ended at this point. The further acts Smith committed to end Brady and Kifer's lives were not necessary to prevent or resist the offenses committed. The jury's findings were also based on an application of existing law to reflect the fact that any threat to Smith's person and property presented by Brady and Kifer had been sufficiently neutralized by the Smith's initial, disabling shots. According to another state statute, "[i]n criminal trials, the court shall decide questions of law, except in cases of criminal defamation, and the jury shall decide questions of fact."

== Appeals ==
Following his conviction and sentence of life imprisonment, Smith appealed to the Minnesota Supreme Court. On March 9, 2016, the Minnesota Supreme Court affirmed Smith's conviction and sentence. In November 2018, Smith's attorneys filed a federal appeal, citing a brief closure of the trial to the public as grounds for Smith's conviction to be set aside, which, if granted, would necessitate a new trial. The federal district court denied relief, and the United States Court of Appeals for the Eighth Circuit affirmed. On November 20, 2020, Smith's lawyers filed a petition for writ of certiorari in the United States Supreme Court, which was denied on March 22, 2021. Smith is currently incarcerated at Oak Park Heights Prison.
