= Derek Chauvin =

American murderer and former police officer (born 1976)

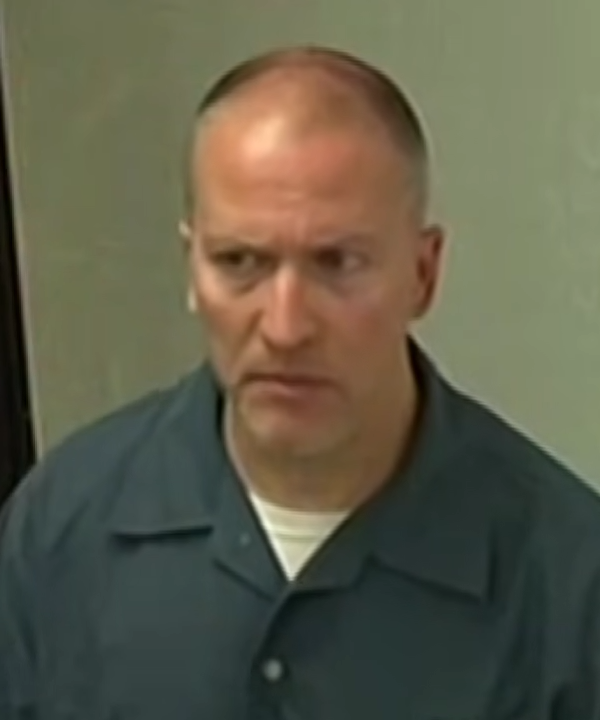
- Chauvin in federal custody, 2023
- Born: Derek Michael Chauvin; 1976 (age 49–50)
- Education: Dakota County Technical College, Metropolitan State University (BS)
- Known for: Murder of George Floyd
- Status: Incarcerated
- Convictions: Deprivation of rights under color of law (2 counts); Unintentional second-degree murder; Third-degree murder; Second-degree manslaughter; Tax evasion (2 counts)
- Trial: State v. Chauvin
- Penalty: Federal sentence: 21 years imprisonment; State sentence: 22 1/2 years imprisonment

Details
- Victims: George Floyd (murdered); Unnamed juvenile (unreasonable force)
- Date: May 25, 2020 (murder of Floyd); September 4, 2017 (unreasonable force to juvenile)
- Country: United States
- State: Minnesota
- Date apprehended: May 29, 2020
- Imprisoned at: FCI Big Spring
- Police career
- Department: Minneapolis Police Department
- Service years: 2001–2020

Derek Michael Chauvin (/ˈʃoʊvən/ SHOH-vən; born 1976) is an American former police officer who was convicted for the murder of George Floyd in Minneapolis, Minnesota in 2020.

On May 25, 2020, Floyd was arrested after a store clerk alleged that he made a purchase using a counterfeit $20 bill. In the course of the arrest, Chauvin knelt on Floyd's neck for about nine minutes while Floyd was handcuffed and lying face down on the street and calling out "I can't breathe". The murder set off a series of protests in Minneapolis, across the United States, and around the world, in support of the Black Lives Matter movement.

In early 2021, Chauvin was put on trial for unintentional second-degree murder, third-degree murder, and second-degree manslaughter and convicted on all of the charges. He was sentenced to 22 1/2 years in prison. Appeals to the Minnesota Supreme Court and the Supreme Court of the United States for review were denied.

== Early life and education ==
Derek Michael Chauvin was born in 1976. His mother was a housewife and his father was a certified public accountant. During his early years, Chauvin grew up in West Saint Paul. When he was seven, his parents divorced and were granted joint custody of him.

Chauvin attended Park High School in Cottage Grove, Minnesota, but did not finish and later obtained a GED certificate in 1994. He earned a certificate in quantity food preparation at Dakota County Technical College and worked jobs as a prep cook. He served in the United States Army Reserve from 1996 to 2004, including two stints in the military police between 1996 and 2000 (first in Rochester, Minnesota, and later Hohenfels, Bavaria, in Germany). During that time, he also attended Inver Hills Community College from 1995 to 1999, and later transferred to Metropolitan State University, where he graduated with a bachelor's degree in law enforcement in 2006.

== Career ==
Chauvin applied to the Minneapolis Police Department (MPD) in September 2000 and joined the MPD in 2001. While on the force, he was involved in three police shootings, one of which was fatal.

=== Commendations ===
Chauvin received a medal for valor in 2006 for being one of several officers who fired 43 shots on Wayne Reyes who pointed a shotgun at them, and another in 2008 for a domestic violence incident in which he broke down a door and shot Ira Latrell Toles who reached for Chauvin's gun, according to police. He received a commendation medal in 2008 after he and his partner tackled a fleeing suspect holding a pistol. In 2009, Chauvin received another commendation medal after apprehending a group of gang members while working as an off-duty security guard at a Minneapolis nightclub.

=== Misconduct episodes ===
Chauvin had 18 complaints on his official record, two of which ended in discipline, specifically letters of reprimand.

On October 29, 2006, Chauvin was one of a group of six officers who opened fire on Wayne Reyes, shooting 43 rounds in four seconds, killing him. Police reported that he had pulled out a shotgun when they stopped his vehicle, responding to a report that he had stabbed his girlfriend and a friend and fled in his truck. Reyes was a member of the Leech Lake Ojibwe Band. The officers were placed on administrative leave for one week; a grand jury in 2007 decided against charging any of the officers, determining that the police use of force in the case was justified.

On May 24, 2008, Chauvin was responding to a domestic violence call about 21-year-old Black man Ira Latrell Toles by the mother of his child. After Toles locked himself in a bathroom, Chauvin forced his way in and attempted to hit Toles's head with the butt of his gun. Police reports stated that Toles reached for an officer's gun and then Chauvin shot him twice in the stomach. Toles told The Daily Beast that he fought back in self-defense but was too disoriented to reach the gun.

On August 8, 2011, Chauvin was involved in the shooting of 23-year-old Alaskan Native American man Leroy Martinez in the torso by fellow officer Terry Nutter. Eyewitness accounts contradicted the police's claim that Martinez was armed when he was shot. According to them and Martinez himself, Martinez had already dropped his gun and held his arms in the air but the police shot him nonetheless. The three officers returned to work after a standard three-day administrative leave. After investigating the incident, the then Minneapolis Police Chief Timothy Dolan stated that the police officers acted "appropriately and courageously".

On September 4, 2017, Chauvin was among officers responding to a complaint by the mother of two young children. Videos from the scene were said to show Chauvin hitting a 14-year-old Black boy in the head with a flashlight so hard he required stitches, and then holding him down with his knee for nearly 17 minutes, ignoring the boy's complaints that he could not breathe. In order to avoid prejudice, the judge in the Floyd trial prohibited the prosecutors from raising this episode.

According to the former owner of El Nuevo Rodeo, a Latin nightclub where Chauvin had worked off duty as security, George Floyd was also working there as security, but it was not certain that they knew each other. The owner has been critical of Chauvin since his arrest, describing Chauvin's methods as "overkill" and saying "Chauvin was unnecessarily aggressive on nights when the club had a Black clientele, quelling fights by dousing the crowd with pepper spray and calling in several police squad cars as backup".

In 2023, the City of Minneapolis agreed to pay almost $9 million to settle lawsuits brought against Chauvin by Zoya Code and John Pope Jr., Black residents who both claimed that in 2017, Chauvin had "pressed his knee into their necks", the same tactic that killed Floyd in 2020. According to a Minneapolis City Council announcement, Code and Pope were expected to receive $1.4 and $7.5 million, respectively.

In May 2024, a former City of Minneapolis employee filed a lawsuit against the city, accusing Chauvin and another MPD officer of throwing her to the ground during a January 2020 drunk-driving arrest and restraining her with a knee. In January 2025, the lawsuit concluded with the city paying a $600,000 settlement fee.

== Murder of George Floyd ==
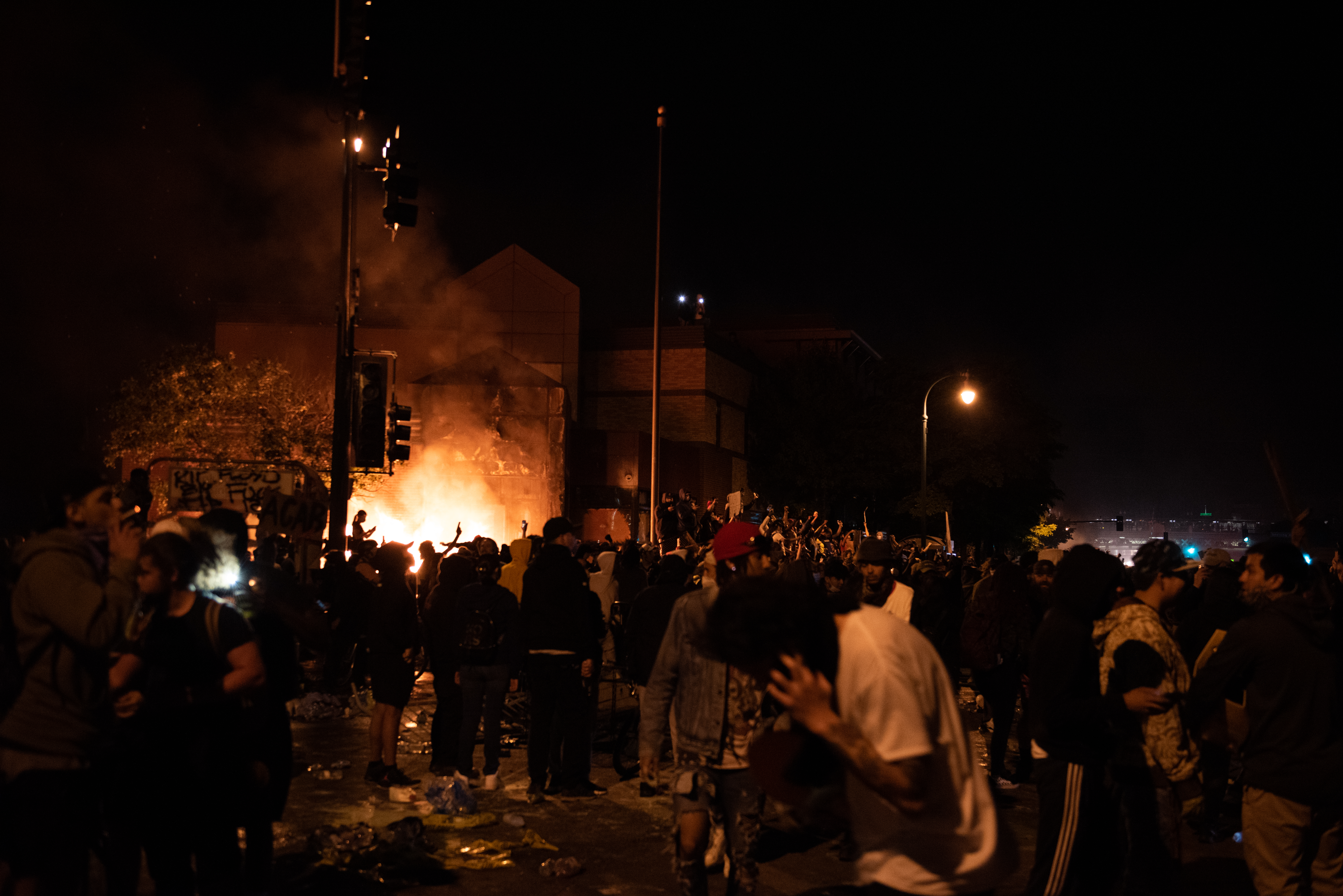
The Minneapolis Police Department's third precinct station where Chauvin was assigned to was overrun by demonstrators and set on fire on May 28, 2020

On May 25, 2020, Chauvin was one of four officers involved in arresting George Floyd on suspicion of using a counterfeit $20 bill at a market and was the field training officer for one of the other officers involved. Security camera footage from a nearby business did not show Floyd resisting the arrest. The criminal complaint stated that, based on body camera footage, Floyd repeatedly said he could not breathe while standing outside the police car, resisted getting in the car and fell down; he went to the ground face down. While Floyd was handcuffed and lying face down on the street, Chauvin knelt on Floyd's neck for more than nine minutes. After Chauvin placed his knee on Floyd's neck, Floyd repeatedly said "I can't breathe", "Mama", and "please". For part of the time, two other officers knelt on Floyd's back. During the final two minutes Floyd was motionless and had no pulse. Several bystanders took videos which were widely circulated and broadcast. Chauvin and the other officers involved were fired the day following the incident. While knee-to-neck restraints were allowed in Minnesota under certain circumstances, in the days that followed, Chauvin's use of the technique was widely criticized by law enforcement experts as excessive. Public outrage over the incident and other issues of racial injustice led to mass protests in Minneapolis, the United States, and across the world.

=== Failed plea bargain ===
On May 28, 2020, state and federal prosecutors held a press conference at a regional FBI office in Brooklyn Center, a Minneapolis suburb, to make an announcement in the case against the officers at the scene of Floyd's murder. However, officials at the press conference said they needed more time to review the case. On June 9, it was revealed that state and federal prosecutors had discussed a plea deal with Chauvin and his attorney that would have included state murder charges and federal civil rights charges, but the deal fell apart when United States Attorney General William Barr rejected it. As part of the failed deal, Chauvin was expected to plead guilty to third-degree murder and agree to a ten-year prison sentence. As he would have gone to federal prison, the federal government was involved, but Barr worried that protesters might view the agreement as too lenient and opted for a full investigation.

=== Arrest and charges ===
May 29, 2020, criminal complaint against Chauvin

Chauvin was arrested on May 29, 2020. Hennepin County Attorney Mike Freeman charged him with third-degree murder, and the lesser included offense of second-degree manslaughter, making him the first White police officer in Minnesota to be charged in the death of a Black civilian. Under Minnesota law, third-degree murder is defined as causing another's death without intent to kill, but "evincing a depraved mind, without regard for human life". Second-degree manslaughter also does not imply lethal intent, but that the perpetrator created "an unreasonable risk" of serious harm or death.

On May 31, Minnesota Attorney General Keith Ellison took over the case at the request of Governor Tim Walz. On June 3, Ellison amended the charges against Chauvin to include unintentional second-degree murder under the felony murder doctrine, alleging that Chauvin killed Floyd in the course of committing assault in the third degree; Minnesota sentencing guidelines recommend 12 1/2 years' imprisonment on conviction of that charge. Bail for Chauvin was set at $1.25 million. Additionally, Ellison also charged the three other officers with aiding and abetting second-degree murder with bail set at $1 million.

On June 23, Minneapolis Police Chief Medaria Arradondo said that Chauvin had been trained in the dangers of positional asphyxiation and characterized Floyd's death as murder.

=== Pre-trial ===
Chauvin was released on conditional bail on October 7, 2020, after posting a bond of $1 million. On October 22, 2020, Hennepin County Judge Peter Cahill dismissed the third-degree murder charge, but also denied Chauvin's motion to dismiss the other, more serious murder charges. On November 5, 2020, Judge Cahill ruled that Chauvin and all three of the others charged would be tried together in Hennepin County. However, on January 13, 2021, Judge Cahill reversed his earlier ruling, deciding that Chauvin would be tried separately from the other three officers. On March 11, 2021, Cahill reinstated the third-degree murder charge against Chauvin.

=== Trial ===
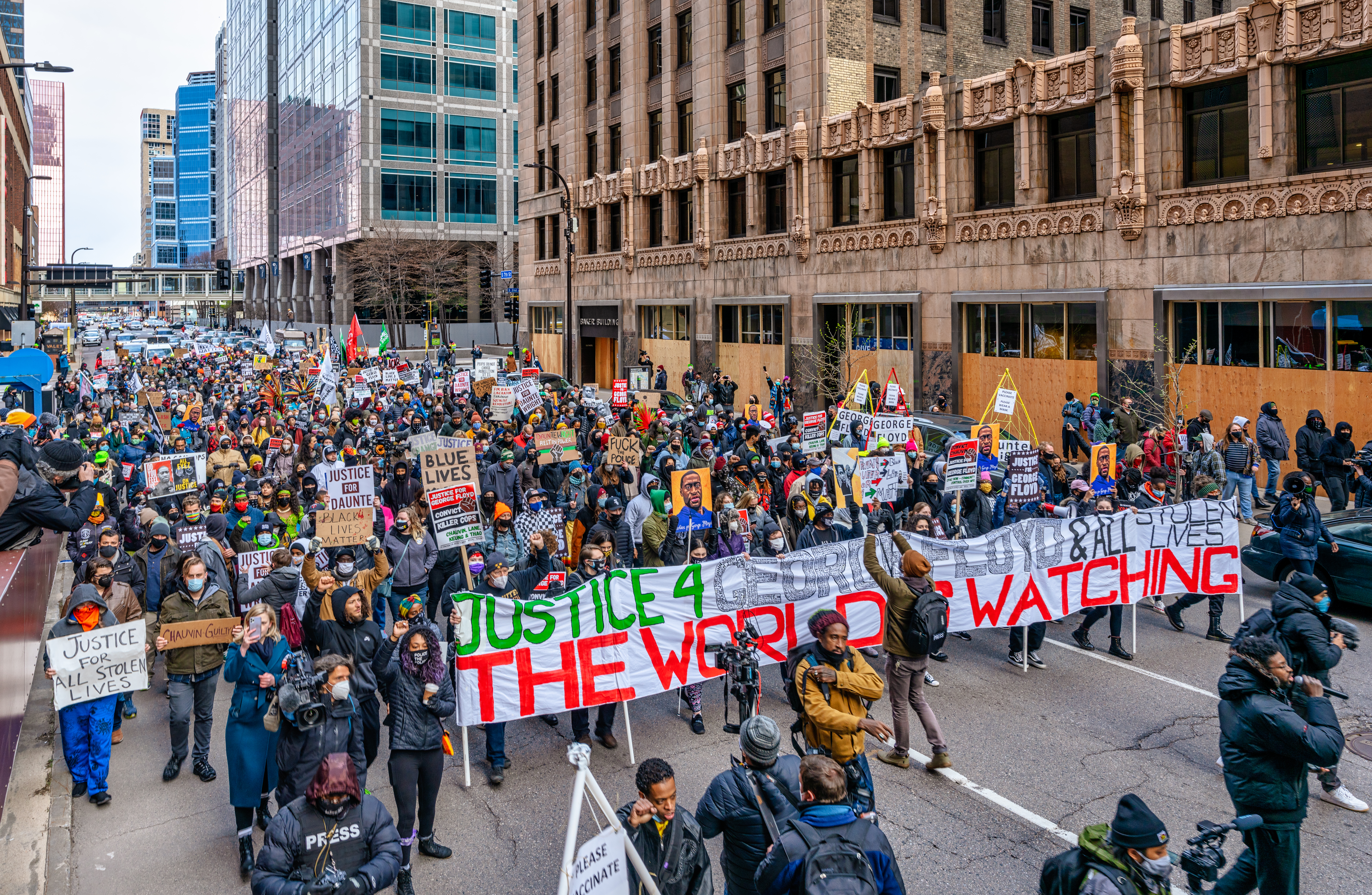
A march through downtown Minneapolis calling for justice for George Floyd on April 19, 2021

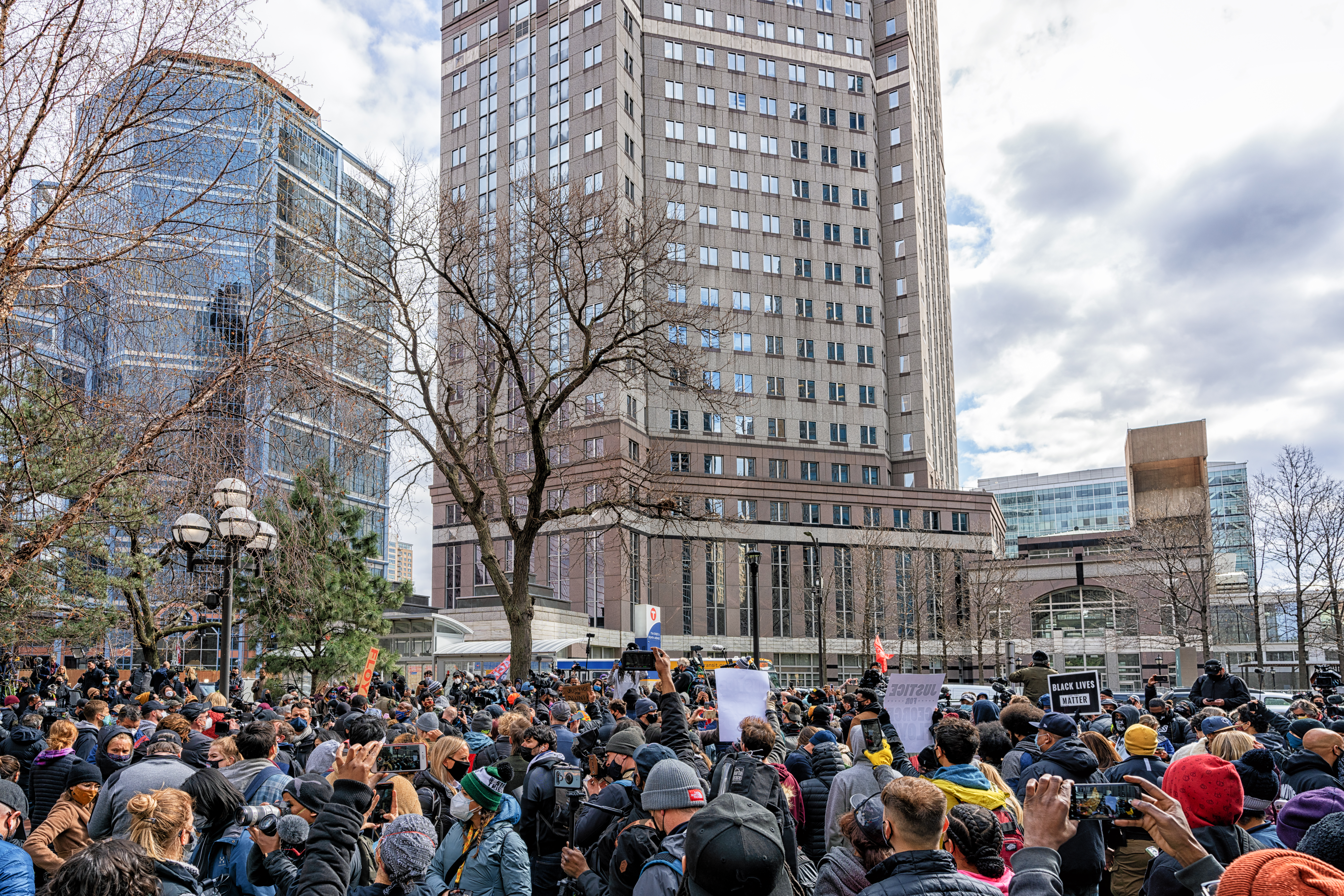
A crowd outside the court venue awaits the verdict announcement, April 20, 2021.

Chauvin's trial began on March 8, 2021, at the Hennepin County Government Center. It marked the first time that a judge in Minnesota authorized cameras to show a full criminal trial. On April 20, 2021, a jury, consisting of six White people and six people of color, found Chauvin guilty on three counts: unintentional second-degree murder, third-degree murder, and second-degree manslaughter. He was the first White Minnesotan police officer to be convicted of murdering a Black person. It was only the second time an officer has been convicted of murder in Minnesota, the first being the third-degree murder conviction of Somali-American officer Mohamed Noor in the killing of Justine Damond, a White woman. Following Chauvin's conviction, Judge Cahill revoked Chauvin's bail and he was taken back into police custody.

=== Appeal ===
Chauvin appealed his second-degree murder conviction and requested a public defender to represent him on appeal. The Minnesota Supreme Court denied Chauvin's request for a public defender, ruling that his financial state rendered him ineligible. Chauvin later hired attorney William Mohrman to represent him. In April 2022, Chauvin appealed to the Minnesota Court of Appeals, asking the court to reverse his conviction and order a new trial, in a new venue, claiming that the jury of the case in the state had been "intimidated by excessive pre-trial publicity". Chauvin's lawyer further stated that the settlement reached between the city of Minneapolis and the Floyd family for $27 million during jury selection amounted to prejudice. In April 2023, a three-judge panel of the Court of Appeals issued a 50-page decision affirming the conviction. Chauvin asked the Minnesota Supreme Court to review the case, but was denied in July 2023.

Chauvin's lawyer asked the Supreme Court of the United States to review the case. The appeal centered on the claim by Chauvin that he did not receive a fair trial due to pre-trial publicity and that potential civil unrest if he was acquitted may have influenced the jury. In an interview from prison for a documentary released on November 16, 2023, by the right-wing media organization Alpha News, Chauvin said, "At the end of the day, the whole trial including sentencing was a sham." The Supreme Court declined to hear Chauvin's case on November 20, 2023, which left in place the state court rulings that affirmed his conviction and for his sentence of 22 1/2 years in prison.

=== Sentence ===
Following his conviction, Chauvin's bail was revoked and he was remanded into custody by the Hennepin County Sheriff's Office, which transferred him into the custody of the Minnesota Department of Corrections. He was then booked into the Oak Park Heights prison, where he had been incarcerated following his 2020 arrest. At Oak Parks, Chauvin was held in solitary confinement for 23 hours a day in an isolated wing of the prison, where he was under constant watch "for fears for his safety". Chauvin was held at Oak Park Heights until his sentencing hearing on June 25, 2021. On May 12, 2021, Hennepin County District Judge Peter Cahill allowed for the prosecution to seek a greater prison sentence after finding that Chauvin treated Floyd "with particular cruelty".

State prosecutors sought a sentence of 30 years' imprisonment for Chauvin based on the extreme cruelty he exhibited when he murdered Floyd, which "shocked the conscience". Chauvin sought probation instead of incarceration. On June 25, 2021, Chauvin was sentenced to 22 1/2 years in prison (with credit given for the 199 days he had already served) on the second-degree murder charge, while the second-degree manslaughter and third-degree murder charges remain not adjudicated. The earliest Chauvin is eligible for release on parole is 2035, when he will be 59 years old. Under Chauvin's federal plea agreement, he will serve his state and federal sentences concurrently and be subject to five years of parole after release.

As part of his guilty plea deal in the federal civil rights case against him, Chauvin opted to serve his concurrent federal and state sentences in a federal prison. On August 24, 2022, Chauvin was transferred from the state correctional facility at Oak Park Heights, Minnesota, to FCI Tucson, a medium-security federal facility in Arizona. He was later transferred to FCI Big Spring, a low-security prison in Texas, after being stabbed.

== Civil rights violations case ==
The United States Department of Justice (DOJ) convened a grand jury in February 2021 to investigate whether Chauvin violated Floyd's civil rights as well as another incident in September 2017 when Chauvin restrained a 14-year-old boy for several minutes, using his knee to lean into the boy's back and hitting him with a flashlight several times. During the restraint, Chauvin ignored the boy's pleas that he could not breathe and the boy briefly lost consciousness. The 2017 incident was deemed inadmissible as evidence in Chauvin's murder trial. Following Chauvin's murder conviction, the investigation was still underway, with the DOJ reportedly weighing whether to bring criminal charges against Chauvin for the 2017 incident.

Federal investigators planned to charge Chauvin and the other three officers for federal civil rights violations, and intended to ask the grand jury to indict him for both the 2017 and 2020 incidents. On May 7, 2021, the U.S. Department of Justice indicted Chauvin, alongside his three co-officers, for constitutional civil rights violations for their involvement in the murder of George Floyd. These indictments caused the state court trial for the three other officers to be pushed back to start on March 7, 2022, from August 23, 2021. Chauvin, also on May 7, 2021, was indicted by the same grand jury for violating the civil rights of the 14-year-old boy he arrested in the aforementioned September 2017 incident. The federal charges were to be prosecuted by Justice Department attorneys in Minnesota and Washington, D.C. On September 16, 2021, Chauvin pleaded not guilty to the charges related to the 2017 incident indictment.

=== Guilty plea ===
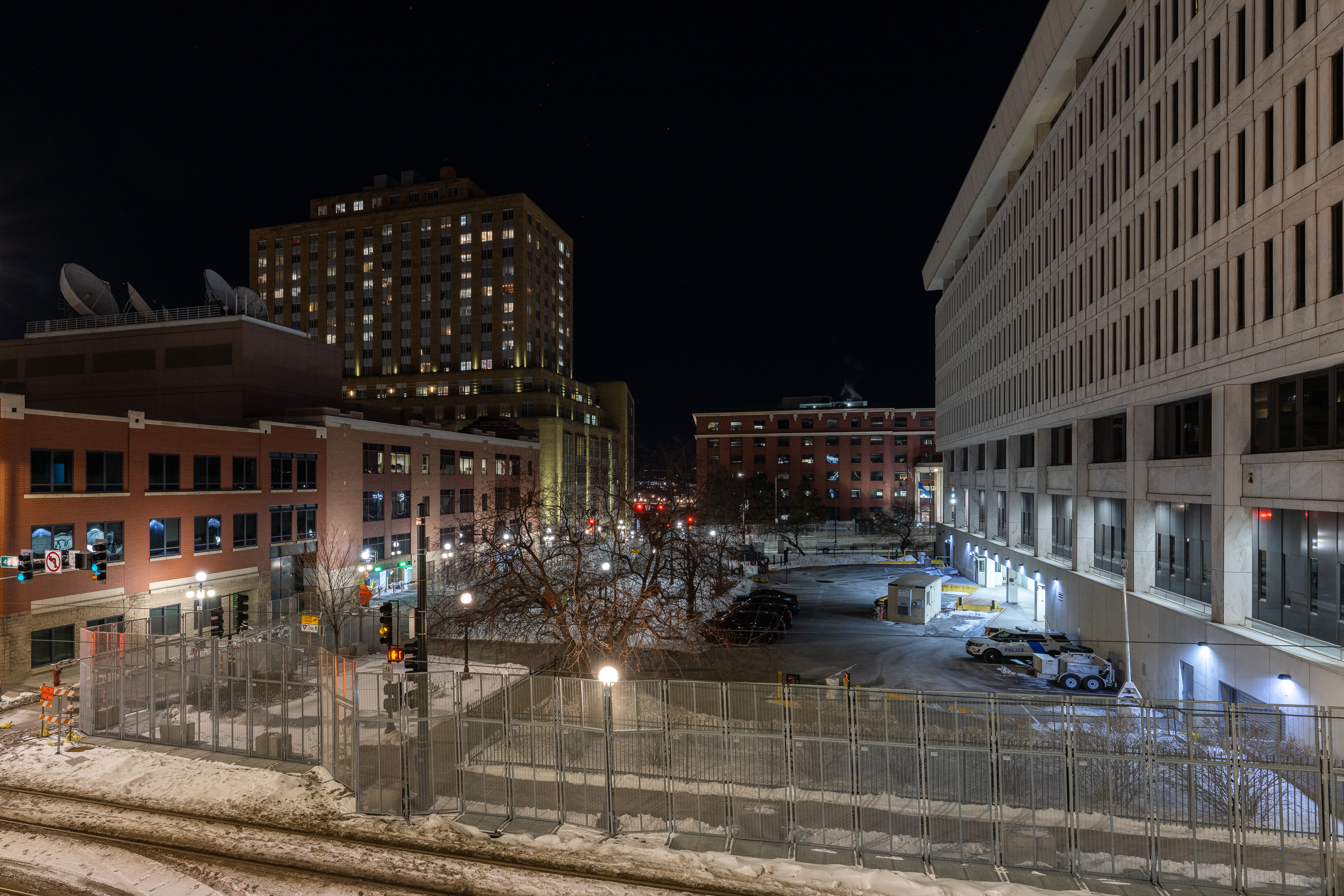
Security fencing at the Warren E. Burger Federal Building in Saint Paul in preparation for the civil rights trial, January 19, 2022

Three months after initially entering a plea of not guilty to the federal charges, Chauvin requested a hearing to offer a revised plea. On December 15, 2021, Chauvin pleaded guilty to the federal charges of violating the rights of Floyd and to violating the rights of the 14-year-old boy in the 2017 incident. Chauvin admitted for the first time that he willfully violated Floyd's constitutional right to be free from unreasonable seizure, which includes the right to be free from the use of unreasonable force by a police officer, by continuously kneeling on Floyd's neck even though Floyd was handcuffed and not resisting at the time. Chauvin also admitted willfully violating Floyd's constitutional right not to be deprived of liberty without due process of law, including the right to be free from a police officer's deliberate indifference to Floyd's serious medical needs. Chauvin admitted that his knee had remained on Floyd's neck even after Floyd became unresponsive. In the plea, Chauvin also admitted violating the 14-year old's constitutional right to be free from the unreasonable force by a police officer stemming from a 2017 incident when he held the boy by the throat, hit him in the head with a flashlight, and knelt on the upper back of the boy who was prone, handcuffed, and not resisting.

According to The Wall Street Journal, a plea deal was reached whereby federal prosecutors would request a 300-month (25-year) sentence to be served concurrently with the State of Minnesota sentence instead of the maximum life in prison. On May 4, 2022, the judge presiding over the federal case accepted the plea deal, paving the way for a sentence of between 20 and 25 years in prison, to be served concurrently with his state sentence. On July 7, 2022, Chauvin was sentenced to 21 years in prison on the charges of violating the civil rights of George Floyd and the boy. In the aftermath of the criminal and civil rights cases against him, Chauvin claimed that other evidence not presented at the criminal trial showed that a tumor may have contributed to Floyd's death and that he would not have pleaded guilty to federal charges had he been aware of it. Chauvin filed a motion in federal court in mid-November 2023 attempting to vacate the civil rights conviction.

In December 2024, US District court accepted Chauvin's demand to have Floyd's tissue remains tested again to check for alternative causes of deaths.

== Tax-evasion case ==
On July 22, 2020, after he was charged with murder, Chauvin and his wife were separately charged in Washington County, Minnesota, with nine counts of felony tax evasion related to allegedly fraudulent state income tax returns from 2014 to 2019. Prosecutors said the couple had under-reported their joint income by $464,433, including more than $95,000 from Chauvin's security work. The complaint also alleges failure to pay proper sales tax on a $100,000 BMW purchased in Minnesota in 2018, failure to declare income from Chauvin's wife's business, and improper deductions for a rental home. Chauvin first appeared in Washington County District Court for his tax-evasion case (number 82-CR-20-2813) on September 8, 2021. The pre-trial hearing was scheduled for January 21, 2022. Chauvin pleaded guilty on March 17, 2023, and was sentenced to 13 months in prison, to run concurrently with his murder sentence with credit given for time already served.

== Ramsey County jail discrimination complaint ==
Following his arrest on May 29, 2020, Chauvin was booked and processed at Ramsey County's Adult Detention Center in Saint Paul. In June 2020, eight correctional officers who work at the jail filed a discrimination complaint against their supervisors with the Minnesota Department of Human Rights. They alleged that during Chauvin's brief stay before his transfer to a state prison, non-White guards were not allowed to work on the fifth floor where Chauvin was being held. The complaint also alleged that a guard had witnessed a White lieutenant sit on Chauvin's bed and that she permitted Chauvin to use her cellphone. Responding to the complaint, the Minnesota Department of Human Rights said that it was opening an investigation to determine whether discrimination took place.

Following a complaint that their charge never gained traction, in February 2021 the Star Tribune reported that the group pursued legal action and filed discrimination charges with the state Department of Human Rights. Their attorney said that his clients sued to hold Superintendent Steve Lydon and Ramsey County "responsible for the discrimination that occurred under their watch." The suit alleges the officers were informed that they would be reassigned because of Chauvin's arrival. One of the plaintiffs said that while he regularly processed and booked high-profile inmates, he was in the middle of patting down Chauvin when the superintendent told him to stop and replaced him with a White officer. The attorney for the group said that they felt "deeply humiliated and distressed" due to the discrimination they had experienced. The suit also says two other officers saw security camera footage that showed that a White female lieutenant "was granted special access" wherein she sat on Chauvin's bed and patted his back "while appearing to comfort him" and let Chauvin use a cellphone. In a statement provided to the Star Tribune by the sheriff's office, Lydon said he "was trying to 'protect and support' minority employees by shielding them from Chauvin".

A $1.5 million settlement was reached with the Ramsey County board in 2022. Ramsey County board chair Trista MatasCastillo apologized, stating that the sheriff’s department was “more than just wrong — they were racist, heinous, highly disrespectful and completely out of line with Ramsey County’s vision and values.”

== Prison attack ==
While serving his concurrent state and federal sentences at the FCI Tucson prison, Chauvin was stabbed 22 times with a shank by another inmate while in the facility's law library at about 12:30 p.m. local time on November 24, 2023. Prison employees performed "life-saving" measures on Chauvin who suffered serious bodily injury and was taken to a hospital for further evaluation and treatment. Prior to the assault, Chauvin's lawyer had advocated for keeping him away from other inmates for his own protection. The stabbing attack on Chauvin was compared to the July 2023 prison assault on Larry Nassar and it raised further scrutiny of inmate safety in the federal prison system. Minnesota Attorney General Keith Ellison denounced the attack, stating that Chauvin "was duly convicted of his crimes and, like any incarcerated individual, he should be able to serve his sentence without fear of retaliation or violence."

Federal prosecutors charged John Turscak, a 52-year old inmate, with attempted murder, assault with intent to commit murder, assault with a dangerous weapon, and assault resulting in serious bodily injury. According to charging documents, the suspect told FBI agents he attacked Chauvin because he was a high-profile inmate and as a symbolic connection to the Black Lives Matter movement with the attack occurring on Black Friday and with other reference to the Mexican Mafia. The suspect was a former FBI informant and gang member who had been featured in a book about organized crime leader Rene Enriquez.

== Commemoration ==
On May 30, 2026, the Republican Party of Minnesota held a moment of silence for Chauvin at the request of a delegate. The decision to do so was criticized by Minnesota Attorney General Keith Ellison as "disturbing."
