= Murder of George Floyd =

2020 police murder in Minneapolis, Minnesota, US

- Frame from Darnella Frazier's video, showing Derek Chauvin kneeling on George Floyd's neck
- Location: 44.93433°N 93.26244°W; Minneapolis, Minnesota, U.S.
- Date: May 25, 2020; 6 years ago c. 8:08–9:25 pm (CDT; UTC−05:00)
- Attack type: Murder by suffocation, police brutality
- Victim: George Perry Floyd Jr.
- Perpetrators: Derek Michael Chauvin; J. Alexander Kueng; Thomas Kiernan Lane; Tou Thao
- Verdict: Federal: Chauvin: Pleaded guilty; Lane, Kueng, Thao: Guilty on all counts; State: Chauvin: Guilty on all counts; Lane and Kueng: Pleaded guilty; Thao: Guilty
- Convictions: Federal: Chauvin, Kueng, Lane, Thao: Deprivation of rights under color of law resulting in death; Kueng, Thao: Willfully failing to intervene to stop use of unreasonable force; State: Chauvin: Unintentional second-degree murder, third-degree murder, and; second-degree manslaughter; Lane, Kueng, and Thao: Aiding and abetting second-degree manslaughter (Note: Lane and Kueng were originally charged with aiding and abetting both unintentional second-degree murder and second-degree manslaughter, but the former charges were dropped after plea deals. Thao was also charged with aiding and abetting murder, but the charge was dropped after his manslaughter conviction.)
- Sentence: Federal: Chauvin: 21 years in prison; Kueng: 3 years in prison; Lane: 2½ years in prison; Thao: 3½ years in prison; State: Chauvin: 22½ years in prison; Kueng: 3½ years in prison; Lane: 3 years in prison; Thao: 4¾ years in prison

On May 25, 2020, George Floyd, a 46-year-old Black American man, was murdered by Derek Chauvin, a 44-year-old White police officer, in Minneapolis, Minnesota, United States. Floyd had been arrested after a store clerk reported that he made a purchase using a counterfeit $20 bill. Chauvin knelt on Floyd's neck for over nine minutes while Floyd was handcuffed and lying face-down. Two other police officers, J. Alexander Kueng and Thomas Lane, assisted Chauvin in restraining Floyd. Lane had also pointed a gun at Floyd's head before he was handcuffed. A fourth officer, Tou Thao, prevented bystanders from intervening.

Before being placed on the ground, Floyd had exhibited signs of anxiety, complaining about claustrophobia and being unable to breathe. After being restrained, he became more distressed, still complaining of breathing difficulties, the knee on his neck, and fear of imminent death. After several minutes, Floyd stopped speaking. For the last few minutes, he lay motionless, and Kueng found no pulse when urged to check. Chauvin ignored bystanders' pleas to lift his knee from Floyd's neck. The next day, after videos recorded by witnesses and security cameras became public, the Minneapolis Police Department fired all four officers. Two autopsies and one autopsy review found Floyd's death to be a homicide.

On March 12, 2021, Minneapolis agreed to pay US$27 million to settle a wrongful death lawsuit brought by Floyd's family. On April 20, Chauvin was convicted of unintentional second-degree murder, third-degree murder, and second-degree manslaughter, and on June 25 he was sentenced to 22 1/2 years in prison. All four officers faced federal civil rights charges. In December 2021, Chauvin pleaded guilty to federal charges of violating Floyd's civil rights by using unreasonable force and ignoring his serious medical distress. The other three officers were later convicted of violating Floyd's civil rights. Lane pleaded guilty in May 2022 to a state charge of aiding and abetting second-degree manslaughter and was sentenced on September 21, 2022, to three years in prison to be served concurrently with his federal sentence of 2 1/2 years. Kueng pleaded guilty on October 24, 2022, to state charges of aiding and abetting manslaughter and was sentenced to 3 1/2 years in prison, to be served concurrently with his federal sentence. Thao waived his right to a jury trial on the state charge in lieu of a review of the evidence by a judge. He was found guilty of aiding and abetting manslaughter in a written verdict delivered on May 2, 2023, and sentenced to 4 3/4 years in prison.

Floyd's murder led to worldwide protests against police brutality, police racism, and lack of police accountability.

== People involved ==
=== George Floyd ===
George Perry Floyd Jr. was a 46-year-old Black American born in Fayetteville, North Carolina, and raised in the Third Ward of Houston, Texas. In 2014, he moved to the Minneapolis area. He resided in the suburb of St. Louis Park, and was a frequent customer at the Cup Foods convenience store in Powderhorn Park, Minneapolis.

=== Derek Chauvin ===
At the time of Floyd's murder, Derek Michael Chauvin, a White American, was a 44-year-old police officer who had served in the Minneapolis Police Department since 2001. Chauvin and Floyd sometimes worked overlapping shifts as security guards for a local nightclub, but the club's former owner was unsure of the extent of their acquaintance.

=== Tou Thao ===
Tou Thao, a Hmong-American, was 34 at the time of Floyd's murder. He had started as a part-time community service officer in 2008. He graduated from the police academy in 2009. After a two-year layoff, he resumed police work in 2012. Six complaints had been filed against Thao, none resulting in disciplinary action. In 2014, a man claimed Thao handcuffed him without cause, threw him to the ground, and punched, kicked, and kneed him; the man's teeth were broken and he was hospitalized. The resulting lawsuit was settled for $25,000. During the Floyd arrest, Thao kept bystanders away. He was found guilty of violating Floyd's civil rights.

=== J. Alexander Kueng and Thomas Lane ===
J. Alexander Kueng, a Black American then aged 26, and Thomas Kiernan Lane, a White American then aged 37, were licensed as law enforcement officers in August 2019. They had trained together. Chauvin was the superior officer responsible for most of Kueng's field training. On May 3, 2020, video of an arrest incident in Minneapolis showed Chauvin, Kueng, Lane, and another officer roughly detaining a man on the ground as bystanders pleaded for them to show mercy. Kueng and Lane were with Chauvin as the day was part of their field training. The man, whom they detained wrongfully, said he had trouble breathing, and the incident was later said to be similar to Floyd's arrest. Kueng and Lane were in their first week as Minneapolis police officers when Floyd was murdered. Lane's application to join the police department had portions covering his criminal history redacted, including convictions for obstructing legal process and damaging property when he was 18. Kueng and Lane helped Chauvin hold Floyd down; both were found guilty of violating Floyd's civil rights. In October 2022, Kueng pleaded guilty to aiding and abetting second-degree manslaughter and in December 2022 he was sentenced to three and a half years in jail.

== Arrest and murder ==
=== Initial events ===
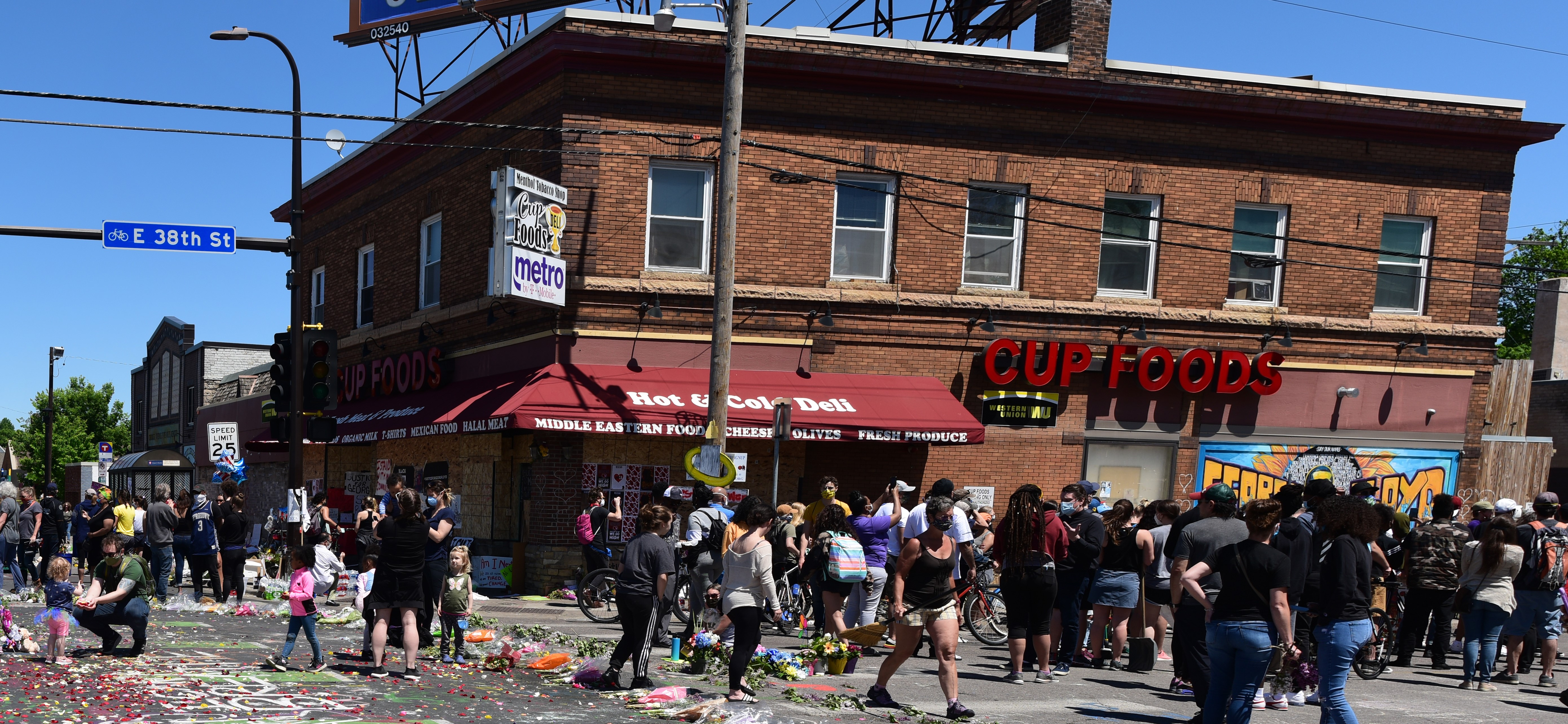
The intersection of Chicago Avenue and E. 38th Street on May 30, where Floyd was murdered just left of the awning

On the evening of May 25, 2020, sometime before 8:00 pm, Floyd purchased cigarettes at Cup Foods, a grocery store at the intersection of East 38th Street and Chicago Avenue in Minneapolis's Powderhorn Park neighborhood. A Cup Foods employee believed Floyd had paid with a counterfeit $20 bill. Other employees approached Floyd while he was in his vehicle and demanded that he return the cigarettes, which he refused to do. Another employee called the police to report that Floyd had passed "fake bills" and was "awfully drunk" and "not in control of himself". The store owner later said that most patrons who pay in counterfeit bills do not know they are fake, and that the store called the police to "make sure there is no crime being committed". The store's security camera recorded the interaction between Floyd and the employees. (Note: Footage begins at 7:50 pm The timestamp on the video is 24 minutes ahead of actual time, according to the restaurant's owner.)

External videos
- Raw police bodycam footage beginning at approximately 8:09 p.m. on YouTube (1 hr 5 mins)

At 8:08, Kueng and Lane arrived, briefly entering Cup Foods before crossing the street to Floyd's SUV, parked in front of a restaurant, Dragon Wok. Lane tapped his flashlight on the window, startling Floyd. He asked Floyd to show his hands, and tapped again when he did not obey. Floyd apologized as he opened the car door. Lane instructed him three more times to show his hands. Seconds after the door opened, he drew his gun and ordered Floyd to show his hands. When Floyd complied, Lane holstered his weapon. Someone parked behind Floyd's SUV began recording a video at 8:10. They briefly struggled, and Lane pulled Floyd from the SUV and handcuffed him. Two other people in the car with Floyd, including 45-year-old Shawanda Hill, were interrogated. At 8:12, Kueng sat Floyd on the sidewalk against the wall in front of the restaurant.

Lane asked Floyd if he was "on something right now", and Floyd replied "No, nothing". Kueng told Floyd he was acting "real erratic" and Floyd said he was scared. Kueng asked Floyd about foam around his mouth, to which Floyd responded that he had been "hooping" (Note: The Washington Post, the Star Tribune, and the Associated Press suggest "hooping" is a reference to basketball. The Los Angeles Times, The Sunday Times, and USA Today suggest "hooping" is a reference to drug use.) earlier. Floyd then said he was calming down, and remarked, "I'm feeling better now".

At 8:13, Kueng and Lane told Floyd he was under arrest and walked him to their police car across the street. The officers then leaned him against the car's door. Floyd told the officers that he was not resisting, but that he was recovering from COVID-19, that he was claustrophobic and had anxiety, and that he did not want to sit in the car. While Kueng and Lane attempted to put him in the car, Floyd begged them not to, repeatedly saying "I can't breathe" and offering to lie on the ground instead. A Minneapolis Park Police officer arrived and guarded Floyd's vehicle (across the street by the restaurant) and the two people who had been in it with Floyd.

At 8:17, Chauvin and Thao arrived in a third police car, joining Kueng and Lane, with Chauvin assuming command. He asked if Floyd was going to jail, and Kueng replied that he had been arrested for forgery. Floyd said, "I can't fucking breathe" twice. Cup Foods security footage shows Kueng struggling with Floyd for at least a minute around 8:18 in the driver's side backseat while Thao watches. According to The New York Times, at 8:19, Chauvin pulled Floyd across the backseat from the driver's side to the passenger side. Then, according to NPR, Floyd exited the vehicle while being pulled out by police and fell to the pavement.

=== Chauvin kneels on Floyd's neck ===
While Floyd lay on his chest with his cheek to the ground, Chauvin knelt on his neck. Floyd stopped moving around 8:20, though he was still conscious. Multiple witnesses began to film the encounter, and their videos circulated widely on the internet. At 8:20, a witness across the street began recording a video showing Chauvin kneeling on Floyd's neck, Kueng applying pressure to Floyd's torso, and Lane applying pressure to Floyd's legs, while Thao stood nearby. This witness stopped filming when one of the officers ordered him to leave. Also at 8:20, a second person, standing near the Cup Foods entrance, began recording the incident. Floyd can be heard repeatedly saying "I can't breathe", "Please", and "Mama"; Lane then asked for an ambulance for Floyd, "for one bleeding from the mouth". Floyd repeated at least 16 times that he could not breathe. At one point, a witness said: "You got him down. Let him breathe." After Floyd said, "I'm about to die", Chauvin told him to "relax". Kueng asked Floyd, "What do you want?"; Floyd answered, "Please, the knee in my neck, I can't breathe."

At approximately 8:22, the officers called for an ambulance on a non-emergency basis, escalating the call to emergency status a minute later. Chauvin continued to kneel on Floyd's neck. A passerby yelled to Floyd, "Well, get up, get in the car, man", and Floyd, still handcuffed and face down on the pavement, responded, "I can't", while Chauvin's knee remained on his neck. Floyd said, "My stomach hurts, my neck hurts, everything hurts", requested water, and begged, "Don't kill me". One witness pointed out that Floyd was bleeding from the nose. Another told the officers that Floyd was "not even resisting arrest right now". Thao countered that Floyd was "talking, he's fine"; a witness replied that Floyd "ain't fine ... Get him off the ground ... You could have put him in the car by now. He's not resisting arrest or nothing. You're enjoying it. Look at you. Your body language explains it." As Floyd continued to cry for help, Thao said to witnesses: "This is why you don't do drugs, kids".

By 8:25, Floyd appeared unconscious, and bystanders confronted the officers about his condition. Chauvin pulled out mace to keep bystanders away as Thao moved between them and Chauvin. Bystanders repeatedly yelled that Floyd was "not responsive right now" and urged the officers to check his pulse. Kueng checked Floyd's wrist but found no pulse; the officers did not attempt to provide Floyd with medical assistance while he was on the ground. According to the criminal complaint against Chauvin, Lane asked Chauvin twice if they should move Floyd onto his side, and Chauvin said no.

=== Medical response and death ===
At 8:27, a Hennepin County ambulance arrived. Shortly thereafter, a young relative of the owner of Cup Foods attempted to intervene, but was pushed back by Thao. Emergency medical technicians checked Floyd's pulse. Chauvin kept his knee on Floyd's neck for almost a minute after the ambulance arrived, despite Floyd being silent and motionless.

Around 8:29, paramedics lifted Floyd onto a stretcher, then loaded him into an ambulance. Lane boarded the ambulance and checked Floyd's pulse at his neck, and a medic instructed him to perform cardiopulmonary resuscitation. A medical device was placed on Floyd's chest to provide mechanical chest compressions, and the ambulance departed for Hennepin County Medical Center.

En route, the ambulance requested assistance from the Minneapolis Fire Department. At 8:32, firefighters arrived at Cup Foods; according to their report, the police officers gave no clear information about Floyd's condition or whereabouts, which delayed their ability to find the ambulance. Meanwhile, the ambulance reported that Floyd was entering cardiac arrest and again requested assistance, asking firefighters to meet it at the corner of 36th Street and Park Avenue. Five minutes later, the fire department reached the ambulance; two fire department medics who boarded the ambulance found Floyd unresponsive and pulseless.

Floyd was pronounced dead at 9:25 at the Hennepin County Medical Center emergency room.

== Investigations and criminal charges ==
=== Minneapolis police response ===
Early on May 26, the Minneapolis Police Department issued a statement that said nothing about Chauvin kneeling on Floyd's neck: "After Floyd got out of his car, he physically resisted officers. Officers were able to get the suspect into handcuffs and noted he appeared to be suffering medical distress." Hours later, witness and security camera video circulating on the internet showed Chauvin kneeling on Floyd's neck. The department updated its statement, saying "new information" had "been made available" and that the Federal Bureau of Investigation (FBI) was joining the investigation. The four officers were briefly placed on paid administrative leave before being fired later that day.

=== Autopsies ===
Two autopsies—one by a local government official and one by doctors working for Floyd's family—determined that his death was a homicide. Released on June 1, 2020, they differed over whether there were contributing factors and whether the agreed cause, restraint and neck compression, was combined with subdual or asphyxiation.

Andrew Baker, a pathologist and Hennepin County's chief medical examiner since 2004, performed an autopsy examination at 9:25 a.m. on May 26. Prosecutors summarized portions of Baker's preliminary findings in charging documents that were released publicly on May 29. Baker's final autopsy findings, issued on June 1, found that Floyd's heart stopped while he was being restrained and that his death was a homicide caused by "cardiopulmonary arrest complicating law enforcement subdual, restraint, and neck compression".

Fentanyl intoxication and recent methamphetamine use may have increased the likelihood of death. Other significant conditions were arteriosclerotic heart disease and hypertensive heart disease, including an enlarged heart, one artery 90% blocked, and two others 75% narrowed. The report said that on April 3, Floyd had tested positive for SARS-CoV-2, the virus that causes COVID-19, but did not list it as a fatal or other significant condition.

Attorneys for Floyd's family announced on May 29 that they would commission a second autopsy. It was carried out on May 31 by Michael Baden, a pathologist and former New York City chief medical examiner, and Allecia Wilson, a pathologist and director of autopsy and forensic services at the University of Michigan Medical School. They announced their results on June 1, a few hours before Baker's final findings were issued. From the evidence available to them, which did not include a toxicology report or unspecified bodily samples, they found that Floyd's death was a homicide caused by asphyxia due to neck and back compression. Also, Floyd had no underlying medical problem that contributed to his death. They said that neck compression affected blood flow to the brain, that ability to speak does not imply ability to breathe, and that Floyd apparently died at the scene.

It was revealed in August 2020 that the United States Department of Justice (DOJ) had the Hennepin County Medical Examiner's official autopsy results reviewed by the Office of the Armed Forces Medical Examiner, which agreed with them. The Office of the Armed Forces Medical Examiner added that the police "subdual and restraint had elements of positional and mechanical asphyxiation".

=== FBI investigation ===
On May 26, the FBI announced it was reviewing the incident at the Minneapolis Police Department's request. On May 28, the DOJ released a joint statement with the FBI, saying that their investigation into Floyd's murder was "a top priority" and outlining the investigation's next steps: a "comprehensive investigation will compile all available information and thoroughly evaluate evidence and information obtained from witnesses... If it is determined that there has been a violation of federal law, criminal charges will be sought".

=== Failed plea bargain ===
On May 28, state and federal prosecutors held a press conference at a regional FBI office in Brooklyn Center, a Minneapolis suburb, in what was anticipated to be a major development in the case against the officers at the scene of Floyd's murder. Hennepin County Attorney Michael O. Freeman, the local official with jurisdiction to bring criminal charges for police misconduct, said his office needed more time to investigate. In explaining the anticipation of the media briefing and its two-hour delayed start, U.S. Attorney Erica MacDonald said, "I thought we would have another development to talk to you about, but we don't". On June 9, it was revealed that state and federal prosecutors had discussed a plea deal with Chauvin that would have included state murder charges and federal civil rights charges, but the deal fell apart when United States Attorney General William Barr rejected it. Chauvin believed his prospects of winning at trial could be poor, and was willing to plead guilty to third-degree murder for a ten-year prison sentence. As he would have gone to federal prison, the federal government was involved. Barr worried that protesters might view the agreement as too lenient and prefer a full investigation.

=== State criminal charges ===
Chauvin's criminal indictment, May 29, 2020

On May 29, Chauvin was charged with third-degree murder and second-degree manslaughter and held at Oak Park Heights state prison. According to the criminal complaint, police are trained that the neck restraint that he applied "with a subject in prone position is inherently dangerous". He was the first officer in Minnesota to be charged in the death of a Black civilian. On June 3, the charge against Chauvin was upgraded to second-degree murder, and the three other officers were charged with aiding and abetting second-degree murder as well as aiding and abetting second-degree manslaughter. (Note: According to Mitchell Hamline law professor Ted Sampsell-Jones, Chauvin was charged with second-degree felony murder, not second-degree intentional murder, which is possible because Minnesota is one of two jurisdictions that rejects the merger doctrine and allows the use of assault as a predicate felony. Though a charge of second-degree intentional murder could have exposed Chauvin under state sentencing guidelines to the possibility of a presumptive sentence as long as 306 months, second-degree felony murder carries the same presumptive sentence as the previous charge of third-degree murder: 180 months. Minnesota law allows the trial court judge to make the requisite finding that the predicate felony posed a "special danger to human life", while federal case law requires every fact essential to a criminal sentence to be submitted to the jury at trial.) The officers were held in jail after the state criminal charges were filed. Before the trials, the four officers were released on bail. Lane was released on June 10, Kueng on June 19, and Thao on July 4. Chauvin was released on October 7 after posting a $1 million bond.

=== State civil rights action ===
On June 2, the Minnesota Department of Human Rights opened an investigation into the Minneapolis Police Department's practices. On June 5, the Minneapolis City Council authorized the mayor to enter a restraining order with the State of Minnesota banning chokeholds and neck restraints, requiring police officers to intervene against other officers' use of excessive force, and requiring authorization from the police chief or designate before using crowd-control weapons such as chemical agents and rubber bullets. On June 8, a Hennepin County Court judge ordered the Minneapolis Police Department to cooperate with a civil rights investigation, and extended the restrictions on the department to require that the chief make discipline decisions in a timely and transparent manner, and that civilian analysts and investigators in the city's Office of Police Conduct Review be given authority to audit body-worn camera footage and to file or amend complaints on behalf of the Minneapolis Civil Rights Department.

In April 2022, the state investigation into the Minneapolis Police found that the city and the police department engaged in a "pattern or practice of race discrimination" and that the police department's organizational culture had "flawed training and emphasized a paramilitary approach" with a lack of accountability.

=== Federal civil rights charges ===
In February 2021, the DOJ empaneled a grand jury in Minneapolis as part of a federal investigation into Chauvin. On May 7, 2021, all four officers were indicted on federal charges of civil rights violations. Chauvin was indicted for violating Floyd's civil rights, along with those of a teenager who survived a similar restraint in 2017. The other three officers also faced charges for violating Floyd's civil rights. Thao, Lane, and Kueng appeared at a hearing virtually, and each posted $25,000 bond. Chauvin did not appear at this hearing, and remained in jail while awaiting sentencing for his state charges.

== Civil litigation and settlement ==
In July 2020, Floyd's family filed a wrongful death lawsuit in federal court against the City of Minneapolis and the four officers involved in the murder. The complaint said Floyd's Fourth Amendment rights were violated by "excessive use of unjustified, excessive, illegal, and deadly force". The lawsuit did not specify the amount of monetary damages the family sought.

On March 12, 2021, the City of Minneapolis announced a settlement with Floyd's family for $27 million. The City Council approved it unanimously. Family lawyer Ben Crump called it the "largest pre-trial settlement in a civil rights wrongful death case in U.S. history" (it was surpassed by a settlement in San Diego in 2025). The settlement surpassed the previous record for Minneapolis of $20 million, paid in 2019 in the killing of Justine Damond. The city allocated $500,000 "for the benefit of the community around 38th and Chicago", the intersection where Floyd was murdered.

== Trials and plea agreements ==
=== Criminal trial of Chauvin ===
External videos
- Pioneer Press Live Stream of Derek Chauvin trial on YouTube (1 hr 44 min 58 s)

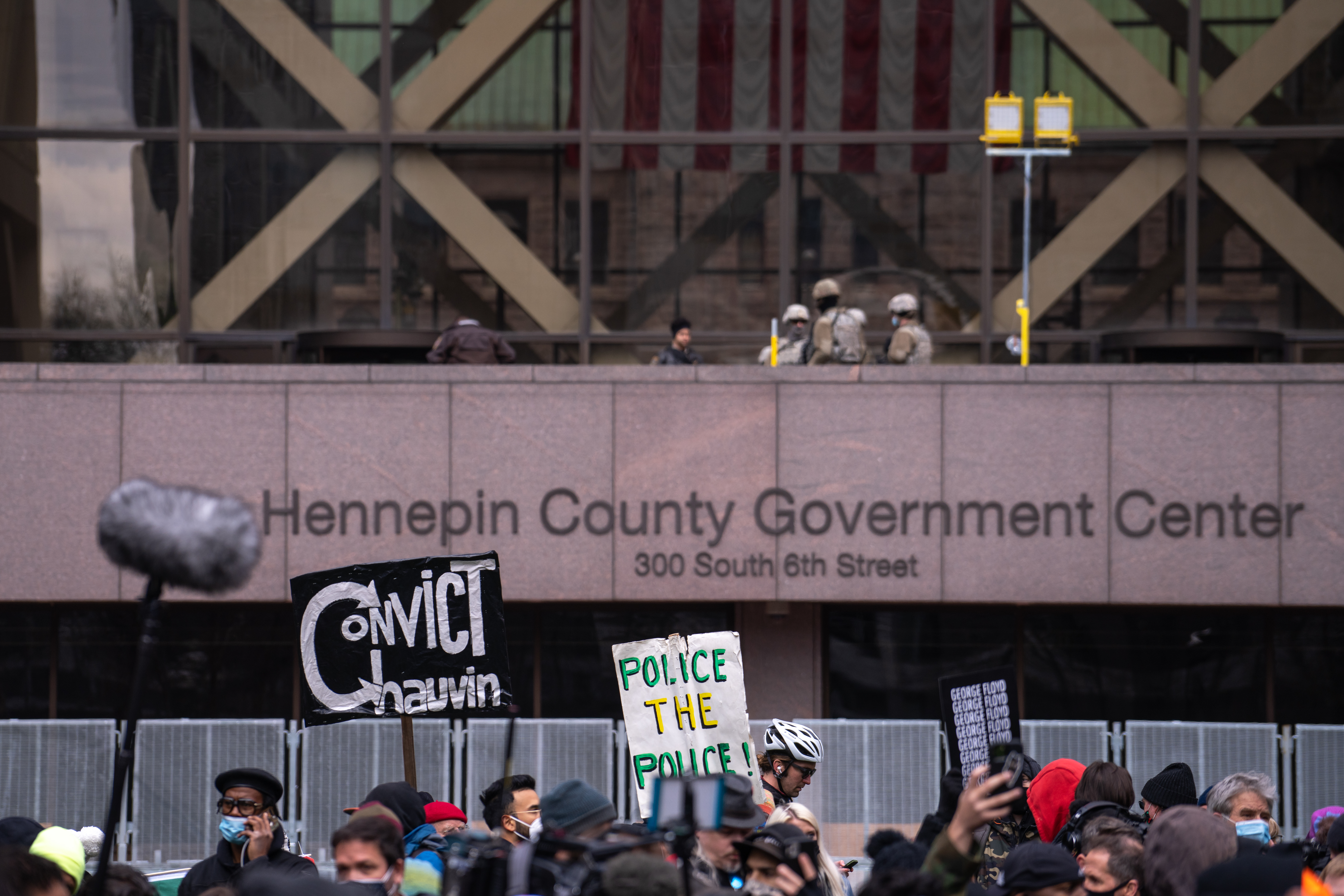
Hennepin County Government Center, the venue of the Chauvin trial, April 20, 2021

Chauvin's trial commenced in Minneapolis on March 8, 2021, in Hennepin County District Court. Opening statements occurred on March 29, 2021, and closing arguments on April 19, 2021.

On April 20, 2021, the jury found Chauvin guilty of all charges, including second-degree unintentional murder, third-degree murder, and second-degree manslaughter. He was the first White Minnesota police officer to be convicted of murdering a Black person. It was only the second time an officer has been convicted of murder in Minnesota, the first being the third-degree murder conviction of Somali-American officer Mohamed Noor in the shooting of Justine Damond, a White woman. Following Chauvin's conviction, Judge Cahill revoked his bail and Chauvin was taken back into custody.

Chauvin was given a sentence of 22.5 years imprisonment. On May 12, 2021, Judge Cahill allowed for the prosecution to seek a greater prison sentence than the 12.5-year state guideline after finding that Chauvin treated Floyd "with particular cruelty".

Chauvin filed an appeal requesting a new trial. On April 17, 2023, a three-judge panel for the Minnesota Court of Appeals affirmed the original criminal conviction. Chauvin petitioned for review by the Minnesota Supreme Court, which denied the petition in an order issued on July 19, 2023. Attorneys for Chauvin filed a petition to the United States Supreme Court for review, but it was rejected on November 20, 2023.

=== Federal criminal civil rights charges ===
The federal civil rights trial was initially scheduled to include all four officers—Chauvin, Kueng, Lane, and Thao—and begin in January 2022 with U.S. District Judge Paul A. Magnuson presiding. The four officers were charged federally with abusing their positions as police officers, depriving Floyd of his constitutional rights to be "free from the use of unreasonable force", and failing to give medical aid. All four officers pled not guilty to the charges at a September 14, 2021, arraignment hearing. Chauvin faced an additional federal charge for a 2017 arrest incident of a 14-year old in Minneapolis that he initially pled not guilty to. In late 2020, prior to the trial, lawyers for Thao, Lane, and Kueng had sought to sever their case from Chauvin's. In a hearing on November 29, 2021, Magnuson ruled that all four officers would stand trial together.

==== Chauvin pleads guilty ====
Chauvin requested a hearing in December 2021 to offer a revised plea to the federal charges, a legal move that did not apply to the other three officers. He pled guilty on December 15, 2021, to the federal charges of violating the rights of Floyd and for the charge related to the 2017 incident. Chauvin admitted to willfully violating Floyd's constitutional right to be free from unreasonable seizure, including the right to be free from unreasonable force by a police officer. Chauvin also admitted to willfully violating Floyd's constitutional right not to be deprived of liberty without due process of law, including the right to be free from a police officer's deliberate indifference to Floyd's serious medical needs. On July 7, 2022, Judge Magnuson sentenced Chauvin to 21 years, with roughly 17 incarcerated and 5 under supervised release, that will be served concurrently with his state criminal sentence. In mid-November 2023, Chauvin filed a motion in federal court to vacate his guilty plea.

==== Trial of Kueng, Lane, and Thao ====
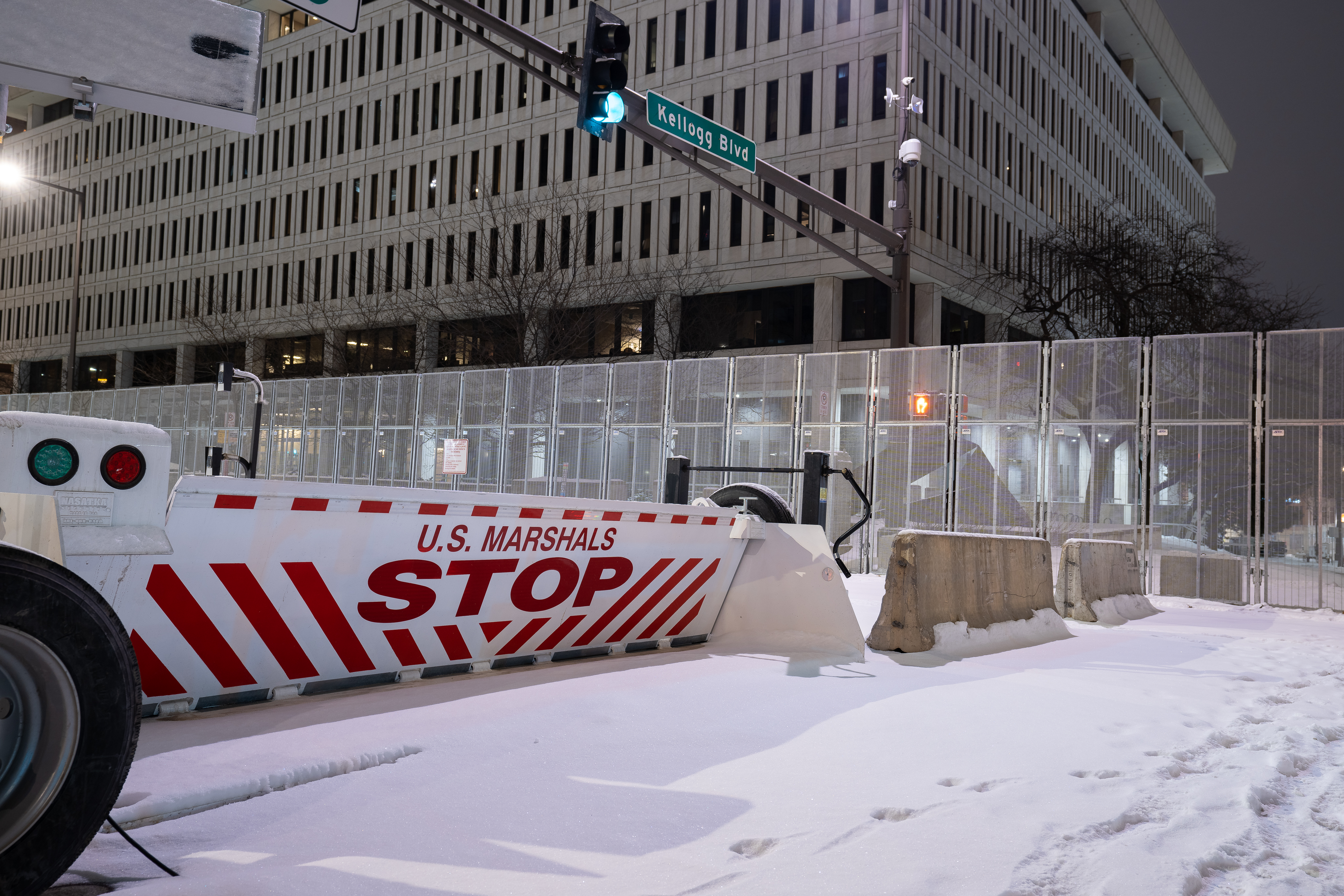
Security fencing at the Warren E. Burger Federal Building in Saint Paul, Minnesota, January 23, 2022

The federal civil rights trial of Kueng, Lane, and Thao was held at a courtroom in the Warren E. Burger Federal Building in Saint Paul, Minnesota. Jury selection began on January 20, 2022, and opening statements were given by both sides on January 24. The 12-person jury seated for the trial was drawn from across Minnesota. The racial makeup of the jury was described by The New York Times as appearing to be all-White, a contrast to the more racially diverse jury during Chauvin's criminal trial.

The prosecution's first witness, Katie Blackwell, testified for three days about the department's training and policies regarding use of force. During her testimony, Blackwell stated that the officers should have moved Floyd onto his side to prevent him having a cardiac arrest. Andrew Baker, who performed Floyd's autopsy, also took the stand to repeat his testimony from Chauvin's trial. The court postponed trial proceedings until February 7, after Lane tested positive for COVID-19.

When the trial resumed, officer Nicole Mackenzie testified that Kueng and Lane were in a medical training course that she instructed, and that her course included lessons in first aid. Dr. David Systrom, a pulmonologist, testified that Floyd's chances of survival could have "doubled or tripled" if the officers performed CPR on him. Use-of-force expert Tim Longo testified that Chauvin was acting outside of department protocol and the other officers should have intervened to save Floyd, although Lane's defense questioned this view. Testimony was also heard from Darnella Frazier, who filmed the initial arrest and Floyd's subsequent murder. The prosecution rested with this testimony.

Tou Thao took the stand to testify in his own defense. Thao claimed that he was not aware that Floyd was suffering medical problems until he was taken into the ambulance, and that the technique of kneeling on a detainee's neck was "not uncommon", although he denied having ever done so. He admitted that neither Chauvin nor any other officers had administered CPR to Floyd, but claimed he took this to indicate Floyd was breathing. Thao also stated that his main role at the scene was "crowd control" rather than to assess Floyd's condition.

Closing arguments were heard on February 22. Prosecutor Manda Sertich stated that Kueng, Lane, and Thao "chose to do nothing" while Floyd was dying. Defense attorneys stated that the former officers were inexperienced, improperly trained, and that they did not willfully violate Floyd's civil rights. After deliberating for 13 hours over two days, the jury on February 24 found the former officers guilty on all counts they faced at trial. All three officers were convicted of willfully violating Floyd's constitutional rights by not providing medical care when he lost a pulse. Kueng and Thao were also found guilty of failing to intervene to stop Chauvin from using unreasonable force. After finding them guilty, the jury concluded that the cause of Floyd's death was Chauvin's restraint, which permitted the judge to consider a lengthier sentence than the recommended three to four years in prison. The three officers remained free on bond while they awaited a sentencing hearing.

In July 2022, Judge Magnuson sentenced Lane to 2.5 years in prison, Kueng to three years in prison, and Thao to 3.5 years in prison. (Note: In the Minnesota corrections system, inmates often serve two-thirds of a sentence incarcerated and the remaining one-third on parole. This is in contrast to the federal corrections system where inmates may be able to reduce the length of their sentence for good behavior, but there is not parole.) Lane was ordered to report to federal prison on August 30, 2022. By October 2022, Kueng and Thao had both reported to federal prison.

Thao filed an appeal, but on August 4, 2023, the United States Court of Appeals for the Eighth Circuit affirmed his federal conviction.

=== State criminal proceedings for Kueng, Lane, and Thao ===
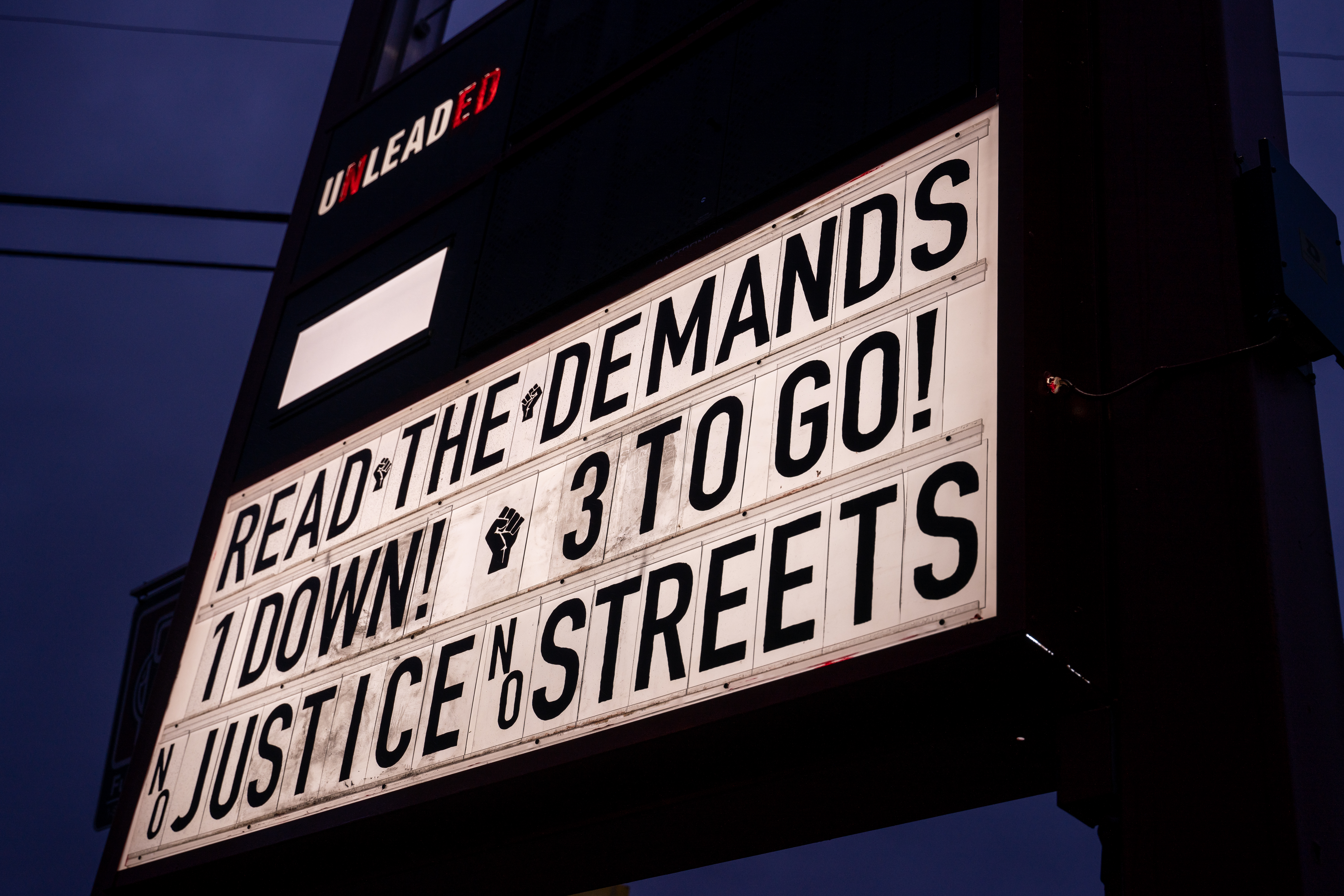
A protest sign at George Floyd Square on May 18, 2021, referencing the three other officers

==== Kueng and Lane plead guilty ====
The state criminal trial of Kueng, Lane, and Thao was delayed several times to allow the federal civil rights case to proceed first. In a ruling on April 26, 2022, Judge Peter Cahill, who also presided over Chauvin's trial, ordered that the proceedings of the trial would not be livestreamed, a move that media organizations criticized.

Lane pleaded guilty in Hennepin County District Court on May 18, 2022, to the charge of aiding and abetting manslaughter related to the murder of George Floyd. The charge against Lane for aiding and abetting second-degree murder was dismissed. Lane agreed to a three-year sentence, with two years in prison, to be served concurrently with his civil rights federal conviction. On September 21, 2022, Lane was formally sentenced by the Hennepin County District Court to three years in prison. In the plea agreement, Lane admitted he knew from his training that the manner of Floyd's restraint created a risk of death, that he heard Floyd say he could not breathe, and that he was aware of Floyd's deteriorating condition. Lane completed both sentences and was released from prison on August 20, 2024.

At a pre-trial hearing on June 21, 2022, Judge Cahill rejected a motion by attorneys for Kueng and Thao for a change in venue, and the judge set a trial start date in Hennepin County for October 24, 2022. The state offered Kueng and Thao the same plea deal they offered Lane. In exchange for pleading guilty to the state charge of aiding and abetting manslaughter, the state would drop the abetting second-degree murder charge and the pair would receive a three-year prison sentence to be served consecutively with their federal sentence, but they rejected it at a court hearing on August 15, 2022. In preparation for the trial, unlike the previous criminal trial of Chauvin and the civil rights trial of the other three officers at the scene of Floyd's death, local officials had not surrounded the courtroom building with barbed-wire security fencing and National Guard troops.

The morning of October 24, 2022, a few hours before the jury selection proceedings were set to begin, Kueng pleaded guilty to the criminal state charges of aiding and abetting manslaughter with a recommendation of 3 1/2 years, to be served concurrently with his federal sentence at a federal prison. On December 9, 2022, Cahill formally sentenced Kueng to the agreed-upon sentence, to be served concurrently to his federal sentence.

==== Evidentiary trial of Thao ====
The same day Kueng pleaded guilty, on October 24, 2022, Thao waived his right to a jury trial in lieu of a trial by stipulated evidence. The legal move required attorneys to submit evidence to the court for review by Peter Cahill, the same judge as in Chauvin's criminal trial. Thao was held in a Hennepin County jail while awaiting the outcome. If found guilty, he faced a potential state sentence from three to five years.

Attorneys for the state and Thao submitted closing arguments to the court on January 31, 2023. The state argued that Thao knew the restraint on Floyd was dangerous and that he encouraged the other officers' actions by holding concerned onlookers back. Attorneys for Thao argued that his role was to control the crowd and that he was unaware that Floyd was not breathing and did not have a pulse. Under Minnesota law, Cahill had 90 days to review evidence agreed to by sets of attorneys—transcripts and exhibits from the criminal trial of Chauvin and the civil rights trial of Kueng, Lane, and Thao—and issue a determination on Thao's guilt.

In a written verdict issued on May 2, 2023, Cahill found Thao guilty of aiding and abetting manslaughter. Cahill wrote, "Thao actively encouraged his three colleagues' dangerous prone restraint of Floyd while holding back a crowd of concerned bystanders" and that Thao knew "Floyd had stopped talking and fallen silent, had stopped moving altogether, and had become totally unresponsive". Thao's guilty verdict was the last case to be prosecuted in state or federal court for the four Minneapolis police officers who had varying roles in Floyd's murder.

After the verdict was issued, Thao remained under custody. His attorney said he planned to appeal the verdict. On August 7, 2023, Cahill sentenced Thao to the maximum of 4 3/4 years, to run concurrently with his federal sentence. He was given slightly less than a year of credit for time served in a county jail facility while awaiting the state trial. Cahill said he believed Thao was less culpable than Chauvin, but more than Lane and Kueng, and that he had hoped Thao would be more remorseful in statements before the court.

=== Releases ===
Lane was released from prison in August 2024 and Kueng in January 2025. Thao was released in November 2025.

== Reaction ==
=== Protests ===
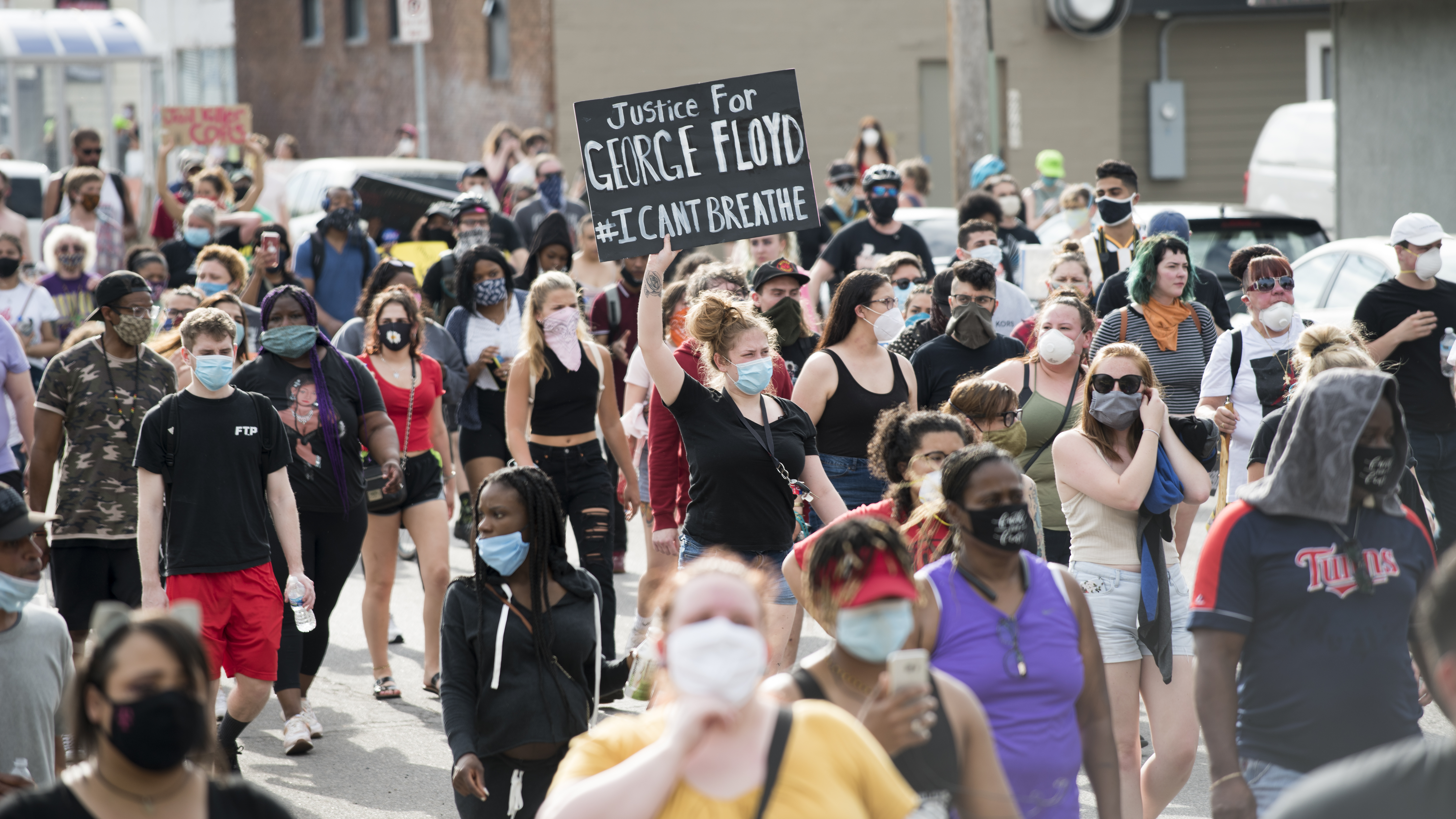
A protest march in Minneapolis, May 26, 2020

Floyd's murder resulted in a global protest movement against historic racism and police brutality. In the United States, protests of racial injustice in mid-2020 were the largest since the Civil Rights movement of the 1960s, and gave way to widespread civil unrest. Protests began locally on May 26 in the Minneapolis–Saint Paul metropolitan area before quickly, within a few days, spreading nationwide and in over 60 countries internationally supporting Black Lives Matter. Over 2,000 cities in the United States had seen demonstrations as of June 13. Many of the demonstrations involved die-ins, with protestors lying down for 8 minutes and 46 seconds, the length of time initial reports said Chauvin knelt on Floyd's neck. While the majority of protests were peaceful, demonstrations in some cities descended into riots and looting, with more being marked by street skirmishes and significant police brutality, notably against peaceful protesters and reporters. At least 200 cities in the U.S. had imposed curfews by June 3, while more than 30 states and Washington, D.C., activated over 62,000 National Guard personnel due to the mass unrest.

The protests were initially peaceful, but later there was vandalism of stores. At the 3rd Precinct police station in Minneapolis, windows were broken, a fence was pulled down, and the front entrance was broken into, causing police officers to fire less-than-lethal rounds at the crowd from the building's roof. After staff evacuated the building, it was set on fire. A six-story, 200-unit apartment building under construction was also burned. Police in riot gear used tear gas, flash grenades, rubber bullets and smoke bombs, and some protesters threw rocks at the police. The media highlighted the apparent differences in aggression between the police response to these protests versus the more restrained response to the 2020 United States anti-lockdown protests featuring gun-wielding White protesters. This sentiment also spread on social media by groups such as Black Lives Matter.

While peaceful protests continued, others again became violent after sundown, with the pattern repeating for several days. More than 1,500 businesses were vandalized or destroyed in the Minneapolis–Saint Paul area, including 67 destroyed by fire.

Following the rioting, a nighttime curfew in Minneapolis–Saint Paul and Dakota County was established on May 29. 500 Minnesota National Guard soldiers were later dispatched to the area to enforce the curfew, but to little effect, with about 1,000 protesters being able to march peacefully on Interstate 35 well into curfew.

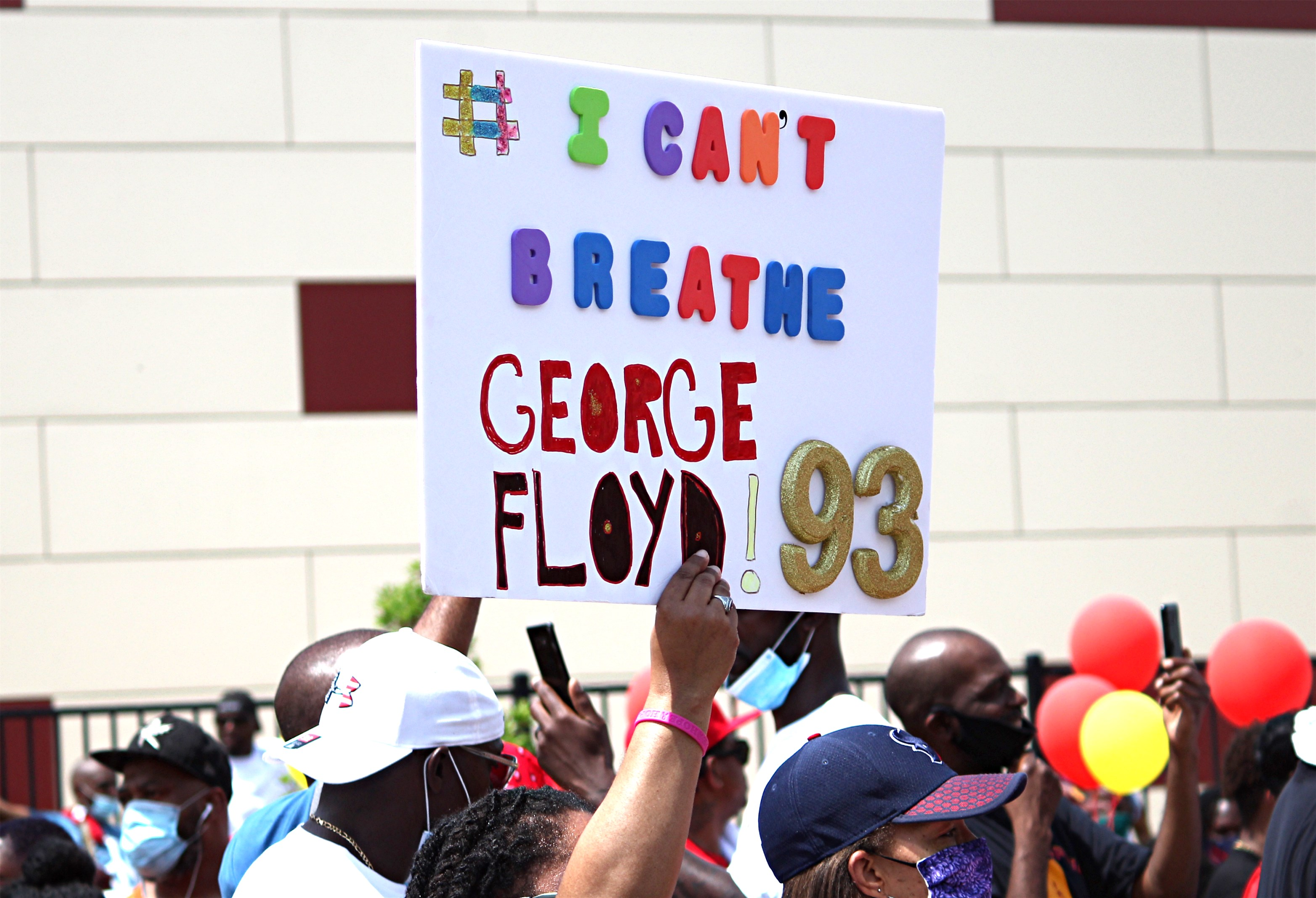
A memorial vigil at Yates High School, from which Floyd graduated, in Houston, Texas

Mass protests demanding justice for George Floyd, in some cases also to demonstrate against issues with police brutality in their own countries, took place in over 2,000 cities in the United States and around the world, By May 30, 12 U.S. states called up the National Guard, and at least 12 major cities imposed curfews that weekend. By June 14, protests had extended into a third week after Floyd's murder in many cities, accompanied by calls to reform and defund police departments throughout the United States.

=== Memorials ===
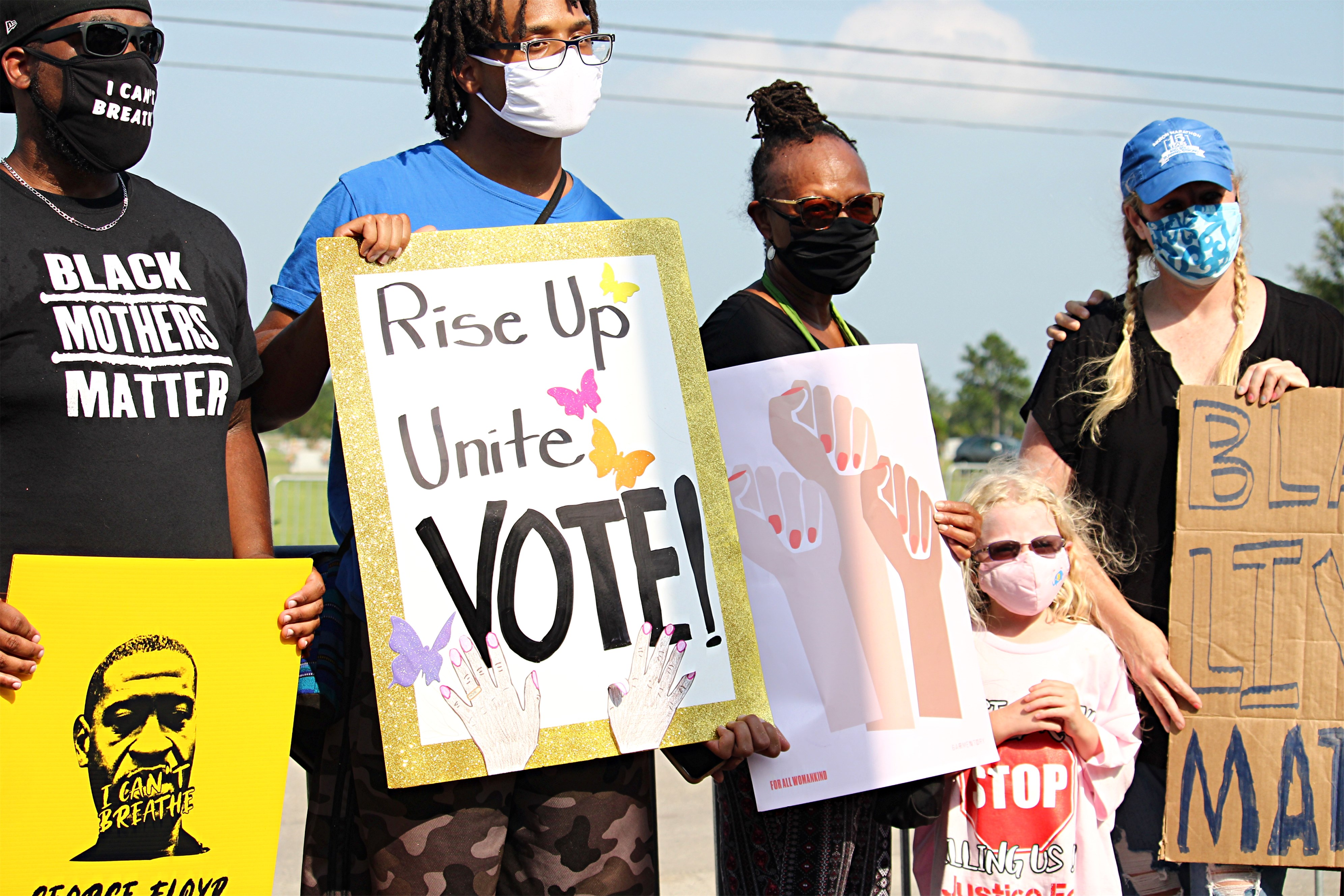
Along Floyd's funeral procession route in Pearland, Texas, on June 9

The area near the location where Floyd was murdered became a makeshift memorial throughout May 26, with many placards paying tribute to him and referencing the Black Lives Matter movement. As the day progressed, more people came to demonstrate against Floyd's murder. Hundreds of people then marched to the 3rd Precinct of the Minneapolis Police. Participants used posters and slogans with phrases such as "Justice for George", "I can't breathe", and "Black Lives Matter". On September 18, the Minneapolis City Council approved designating the section of Chicago Avenue between 37th and 39th Streets as George Perry Floyd Jr. Place, with a marker at the intersection with 38th Street where the incident took place. The intersection has been closed and occupied by demonstrators who said they will not leave until their demands regarding anti-racism and property tax are met.

A public memorial, with Al Sharpton delivering the eulogy, was held June 4 at North Central University in Minneapolis. A public viewing and a family memorial was held in Raeford, North Carolina on June 6, near Floyd's hometown. Floyd's family held a public memorial in Houston on June 8, and a private service on June 9. The family said professional boxer Floyd Mayweather paid for the services. Floyd's body was on public view on June 8 in his hometown of Houston. Former Vice President and the 2020 presumptive and eventual Democratic nominee, Joe Biden, met with the Floyd family privately and gave a video message at the funeral. Floyd is buried next to his mother in Pearland, Texas.

The length of time that Chauvin was originally reported to have had his knee on Floyd's neck, 8:46, was widely commemorated as a "moment of silence" to honor Floyd. It was also used in chants, protest signs, and messages, as were the words "I can't breathe".

=== Other reactions ===
A variety of people and organizations reacted to Floyd's murder. Numerous statues and monuments honoring persons or events associated with slavery and racism were vandalized, removed, or destroyed during the protests in the U.S. and elsewhere.

== Aftermath ==
=== Media ===
Darnella Frazier, who, as a 17-year-old, filmed Floyd's restraint on her cell phone, received the 2020 PEN/Benenson Courage Award from PEN America. The award was presented to her at an awards ceremony in December 2020 by film director Spike Lee. PEN America CEO Suzanne Nossel said that Frazier's act sparked a "bold movement demanding an end to systemic anti-Black racism and violence at the hands of police". In June 2021, Frazier also received a special citation from the Pulitzer Prize committee in 2021 for her video. The staff of the Star Tribune received the prize for Breaking News Reporting for their coverage of protests.

=== Policing ===
Chokeholds and other neck restraints were banned or restricted by at least 17 state legislatures in the year after Floyd's murder. In some states, police disciplinary records have become public.

=== Justice Department review ===
As a result of Floyd's murder, the United States Department of Justice conducted a federal review of the Minneapolis Police Department. Its report, released in June 2023, found that the city's police had a pattern and practice of using deadly and other force excessively, of disproportionately searching and stopping Black and Native American people, of violating the free-speech rights of protesters, and of discriminating against people with behavior health disabilities during emergency responses. About the report, Attorney General Merrick Garland said that "the patterns and practices we observed made what happened to George Floyd possible". It was characterized as a call to change by several politicians, including President Joe Biden, U.S. Senator for Minnesota Amy Klobuchar, U.S. Representative for Minnesota's 5th district (which includes Minneapolis) Ilhan Omar, Minnesota Attorney General Keith Ellison, and Minneapolis Mayor Jacob Frey.

Along with its findings, the Department of Justice announced that Minneapolis and the Minneapolis Police Department agreed "in principle" to negotiate a court-enforced consent decree with the DOJ, the city's second consent decree regarding policing after it entered one with the Minnesota Department of Human Rights.

== See also ==
- List of unarmed African Americans killed by law enforcement officers in the United States
- 2020 American athlete strikes
- 2020–2023 Minneapolis–Saint Paul racial unrest
- Killing of Renée Good, 2026 homicide that occurred around one mile from Floyd's murder
- Killing of Tony Timpa, who died in a similar way while in police custody (Dallas, 2016)
- List of killings by law enforcement officers in Minnesota
- Lists of killings by law enforcement officers in the United States
- List of law enforcement officers convicted for an on-duty killing in the United States
- Death of Abisay Cruz
