= Murder in Minnesota law =

Aspect of Minnesota criminal law

Murder in Minnesota law constitutes the killing, under circumstances defined by law, of people within or under the jurisdiction of the U.S. state of Minnesota.

The United States Centers for Disease Control and Prevention reported that in the year 2021, the state had a murder rate somewhat below the median for the entire country.

== Definitions ==
=== First-degree murder ===
Minnesota law specifies five levels of homicide in total, with first-degree murder being the most serious form of homicide. First-degree murder constitutes the killing of an individual under one of the following circumstances.

- **The murder was premeditated**
- **The murder was committed while the perpetrator was committing or attempting to commit criminal sexual conduct in the first or second degree with force or violence**
- The murder was committed while the perpetrator was committing or attempting to commit burglary, aggravated robbery, arson in the first or second degree, a drive-by shooting, tampering with a witness in the first degree, escape from custody, or the unlawful sale of a controlled substance
- **The murder was of a peace officer, prosecuting attorney, judge, or a guard employed at a Minnesota state or local correctional facility, with intent to effect the death of that person or another, while the person is engaged in the performance of official duties**
- The murder was of a minor while the perpetrator was committing child abuse, when the perpetrator has engaged in a past pattern of child abuse upon a child and the death occurs under circumstances manifesting an extreme indifference to human life
- The murder was committed while the perpetrator was committing domestic abuse, when the perpetrator has engaged in a past pattern of domestic abuse upon the victim or upon another family or household member and the death occurs under circumstances manifesting an extreme indifference to human life
- **The murder was committed while the perpetrator was committing, conspiring to commit, or attempting to commit a felony crime to further terrorism and the death occurs under circumstances manifesting an extreme indifference to human life**
- **The murder was committed during a kidnapping**
- **The perpetrator had been previously convicted of another "heinous crime"**

The factors in bold are factors that warrant a sentence of life imprisonment without parole. Without one of the circumstances in bold, the standard sentence for first-degree murder is life-with-parole after 30 years. The only exception for life-without-parole sentences are for first-degree murders where the perpetrator was under the age of 18, as Minnesota abolished juvenile life-without-parole sentences in May 2023.

=== Second-degree murder ===
Second-degree murder in Minnesota is split into two types: intentional and unintentional. Intentional second-degree murder constitutes the intentional murder of a person without premeditation. Unintentional second-degree murder is defined as a murder in which the prosecution is not required to prove intent, (Note: This does not mean there is no possibility that intent was present, just that it is not a burden for the prosecution to prove.) but only that the defendant committed a felony causing another person's death. Unintentional second-degree murder is Minnesota's felony murder rule; unlike most other states that have the felony murder rule, Minnesota punishes felony murder as second-degree murder rather than first-degree. Minnesota's rule is unique in the sense that it does not require an independent felony from the elements of murder, so a felony such as assault causing someone's death can result in a defendant being charged with second-degree murder.

The maximum sentence for second-degree murder is 40 years in prison, and the recommended sentencing guidelines suggest 12 1/2 years for a first-time offender. There is no mandatory minimum, so hypothetically someone could serve no prison time for second-degree murder.

Derek Chauvin, a White police officer who murdered George Floyd, an unarmed black man, was convicted of second-degree murder under the state's felony murder rule in a highly publicized trial in 2021, with the underlying felony being assault. Chauvin received a sentence of 22 1/2 years in prison.

=== Third-degree murder ===
Third-degree murder in Minnesota is defined as when a perpetrator engages in an act eminently dangerous to others and evinces a depraved mind, without regard for human life, or engages in a drug deal resulting in someone's death. The recommended sentencing guideline for third-degree murder is 10 to 15 years in prison for a first-time offender, and the maximum is 25 years in prison. There is no minimum, so a defendant could hypothetically serve no prison time.

=== First-degree manslaughter ===
First-degree manslaughter in Minnesota is defined as the manslaughter of an individual under one of the following circumstances:

- Intentionally causing the death of another person in the heat of passion provoked by such words or acts of another as would provoke a person of ordinary self-control under like circumstances, provided that the crying of a child does not constitute provocation;
- Violating section 609.224 and causing the death of another or causing the death of another in committing or attempting to commit a misdemeanor or gross misdemeanor offense with such force and violence that death of or great bodily harm to any person was reasonably foreseeable, and murder in the first or second degree was not committed thereby;
- Intentionally causing the death of another person because the actor is coerced by threats made by someone other than the actor's coconspirator and which cause the actor reasonably to believe that the act performed by the actor is the only means of preventing imminent death to the actor or another;
- Proximately causing the death of another, without intent to cause death by, directly or indirectly, unlawfully selling, giving away, bartering, delivering, exchanging, distributing, or administering a controlled substance classified in Schedule III, IV, or V; or
- Causing the death of another in committing or attempting to commit a violation of section 609.377 (malicious punishment of a child), and murder in the first, second, or third degree is not committed thereby.

=== Second-degree manslaughter ===
Second-degree manslaughter in Minnesota is defined as causing the death of an individual under one of the following circumstances:

- By the person's culpable negligence whereby the person creates an unreasonable risk, and consciously takes chances of causing death or great bodily harm to another; or
- By shooting another with a firearm or other dangerous weapon as a result of negligently believing the other to be a deer or other animal; or
- By setting a spring gun, pitfall, deadfall, snare, or other like dangerous weapon or device; or
- By negligently or intentionally permitting any animal, known by the person to have vicious propensities or to have caused great or substantial bodily harm in the past, to run uncontrolled off the owner's premises, or negligently failing to keep it properly confined; or
- By committing or attempting to commit a violation of section 609.378 (neglect or endangerment of a child), and murder in the first, second, or third degree is not committed thereby.

== Penalties ==
The sentences for homicide offenses in Minnesota are listed below.

Offense	Mandatory sentence
Second-degree manslaughter	Up to 10 years in prison
Vehicular homicide	Up to 10 years in prison
First-degree manslaughter	Up to 15 years in prison
Third-degree murder	Up to 25 years in prison
Second-degree murder	Up to 40 years in prison
First-degree murder	For adults: Life imprisonment with the possibility of parole after 30 years, or life-without-parole For juveniles: Life-with-parole after 15 years
