= Crime in Minnesota =

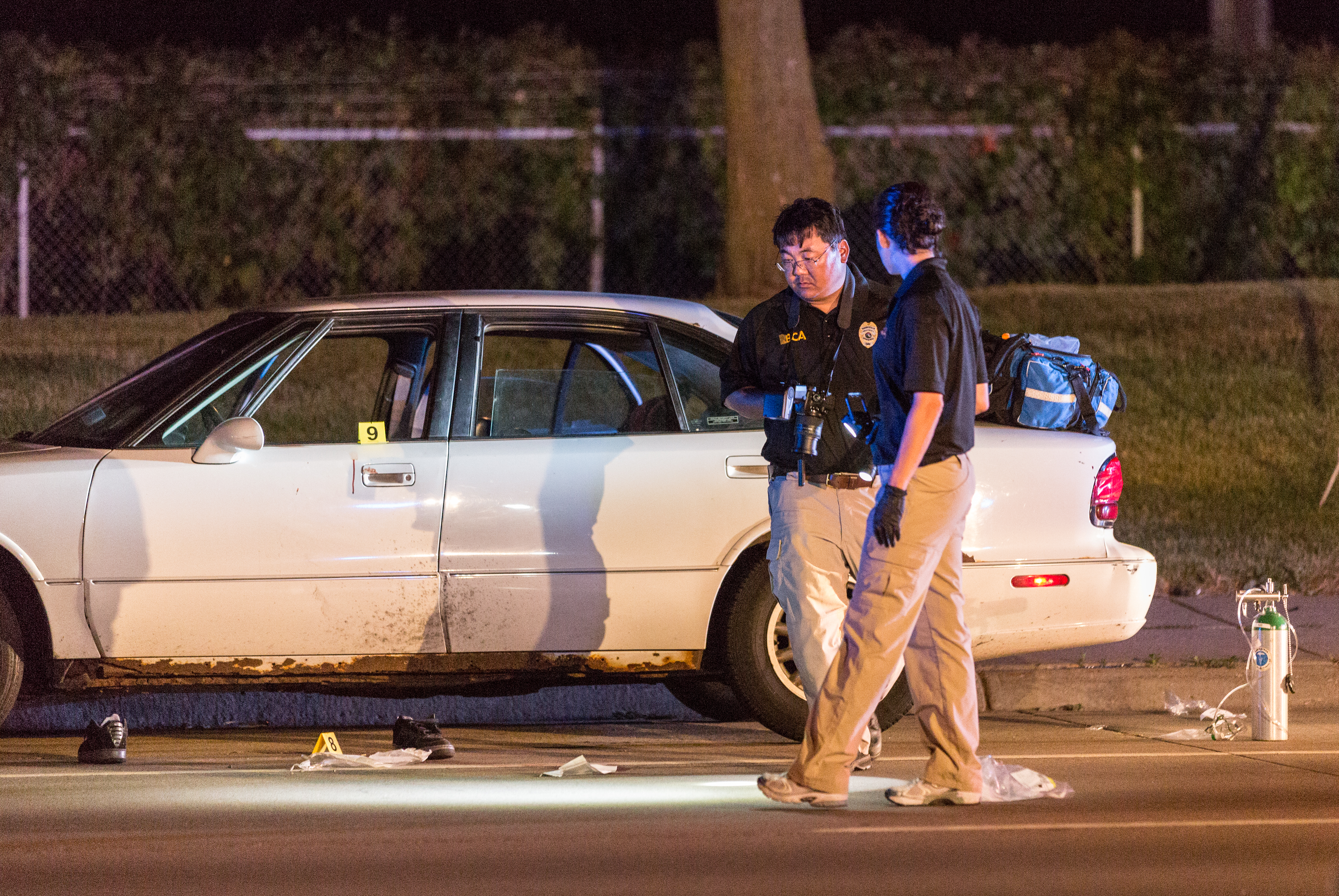
Minnesota Bureau of Criminal Apprehension (BCA) investigators at the shooting of Philando Castile crime scene

Crime in Minnesota encompasses a wide range of unlawful activities that occur within the state, regulated by both state and federal laws. While crime rates in Minnesota are generally below the national average, certain areas and types of crime have garnered public attention.

== Notable incidents ==
The historical development of crime in Minnesota has been influenced by factors including immigration patterns, economic fluctuations, and social changes. During the early 20th century, organized crime, primarily related to prohibition, was a notable issue. Over the decades, the types and rates of crime have evolved.

=== The gangster era ===
During the Great Depression, Minnesota gained notoriety as a haven for gangsters. Among the most infamous were Ma Barker and her son Fred Barker, along with Alvin Karpis, who were part of the Barker-Karpis gang. They were responsible for a series of robberies, kidnappings, and murders. In 1933, they kidnapped William Hamm, a millionaire brewer, and secured a ransom for his release.

=== Wetterling case ===
One of the most high-profile cases was the kidnapping and murder of 11-year-old Jacob Wetterling in 1989. Wetterling's disappearance remained unsolved for nearly 27 years, with his remains finally discovered in 2016. The case had a profound impact on Minnesota and the entire nation, leading to the establishment of the Jacob Wetterling Crimes Against Children and Sexually Violent Offender Registration Act, requiring states to implement a sex offender and crimes against children registry.

=== Minneapolis Police Department controversies ===
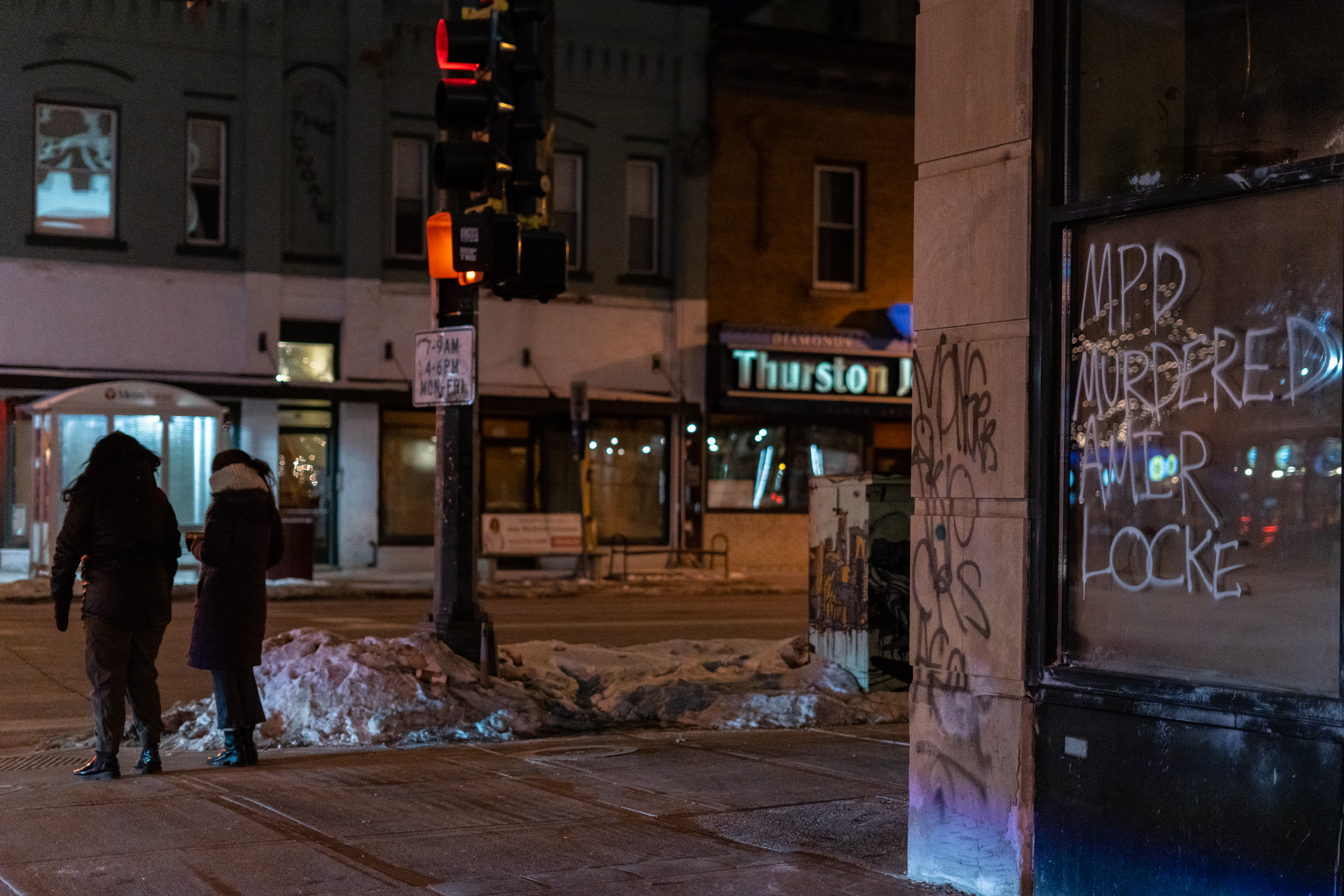
Graffiti in Minneapolis on February 2, 2022, states, "MPD murdered Amir Locke".

In recent years, the Minneapolis Police Department has been at the center of national attention for instances of police brutality, most notably the murder of George Floyd in 2020. The incident sparked nationwide protests including rioting and led to an ongoing debate on police reform. The event prompted the Minneapolis City Council to consider dismantling the police department, a move that voters rejected in 2021.

=== Timeline of incidents ===
- 1918: Lynching of Olli Kinkkonen
- 1920: Duluth lynchings
- 1965: Murder of Dennis Jurgens
- 1972: Virginia Piper kidnapping
- 1982: Minneapolis Thanksgiving Day fire
- 1989: Murder of Jacob Wetterling
- 1993: Murder of Brian Glick
- 1998:Khoua Her
- 2003: Rocori High School shooting
- 2005: Red Lake shootings
- 2007: Murder of Katherine Ann Olson
- 2011: Killing of Dean Schmitz
- 2012:
  - Minneapolis firm shooting
  - Murders of Haile Kifer and Nicholas Brady
- 2014:
  - Death of Andrew Sadek
  - University of Minnesota rape case
- 2016:
  - Minneapolis shooting
  - Murder of Alayna Ertl
  - St. Cloud, Minnesota knife attack
- 2017:
  - Killing of Justine Damond
  - Bloomington mosque bombing
- 2020:
  - Murder of George Floyd (Arson)
- 2021:
  - Buffalo, Minnesota clinic attack
  - Killing of Daunte Wright
  - Killing of Winston Boogie Smith
  - Killing of Deona Marie Knajdek
  - Killing of Leneal Frazier
  - Killing of America Thayer
- 2022:
  - Killing of Amir Locke
  - Feeding Our Future (part of 2020s Minnesota fraud scandals)
- 2023:
  - Killing of Ricky Cobb II
- 2024:
  - Burnsville shooting
  - Whittier, Minneapolis shooting
- 2025:
  - 2025 shootings of Minnesota legislators
  - Annunciation Catholic Church shooting
  - Killing of Amber Czech

== Crime rates ==
Violent crime and prison incarceration rate per 100,000 population from 1960 to 2014

According to the FBI's Uniform Crime Reporting (UCR) program, Minnesota's crime rates have generally remained below the national average. However, fluctuations occur year-to-year, and some cities, such as Minneapolis and St. Paul, experience higher crime rates compared to other parts of the state.

In 1990, Minnesota reported a violent crime rate of 291 incidents per 100,000 residents. By 1994, this number peaked at 356 before stabilizing somewhat in the 2000s. However, the rate surged again to 311 by 2021.

Property crime in Minnesota has shown a more consistent trend of reduction. In 1990, the state had a property crime rate of 4,265 per 100,000 residents, which decreased to 2,078 by 2021. This decline is in line with national trends.

=== Crime rates in Minneapolis ===
As of 2023, the overall crime rate in Minneapolis, the state's largest city, stands at approximately 5,713 crimes per 100,000 residents. This rate is approximately 138% higher than the state average and 143% higher than the national average. While this number represents a decrease from the peak reached in 2021, it still paints a picture of Minneapolis as a city with significantly higher crime rates than the average American city.

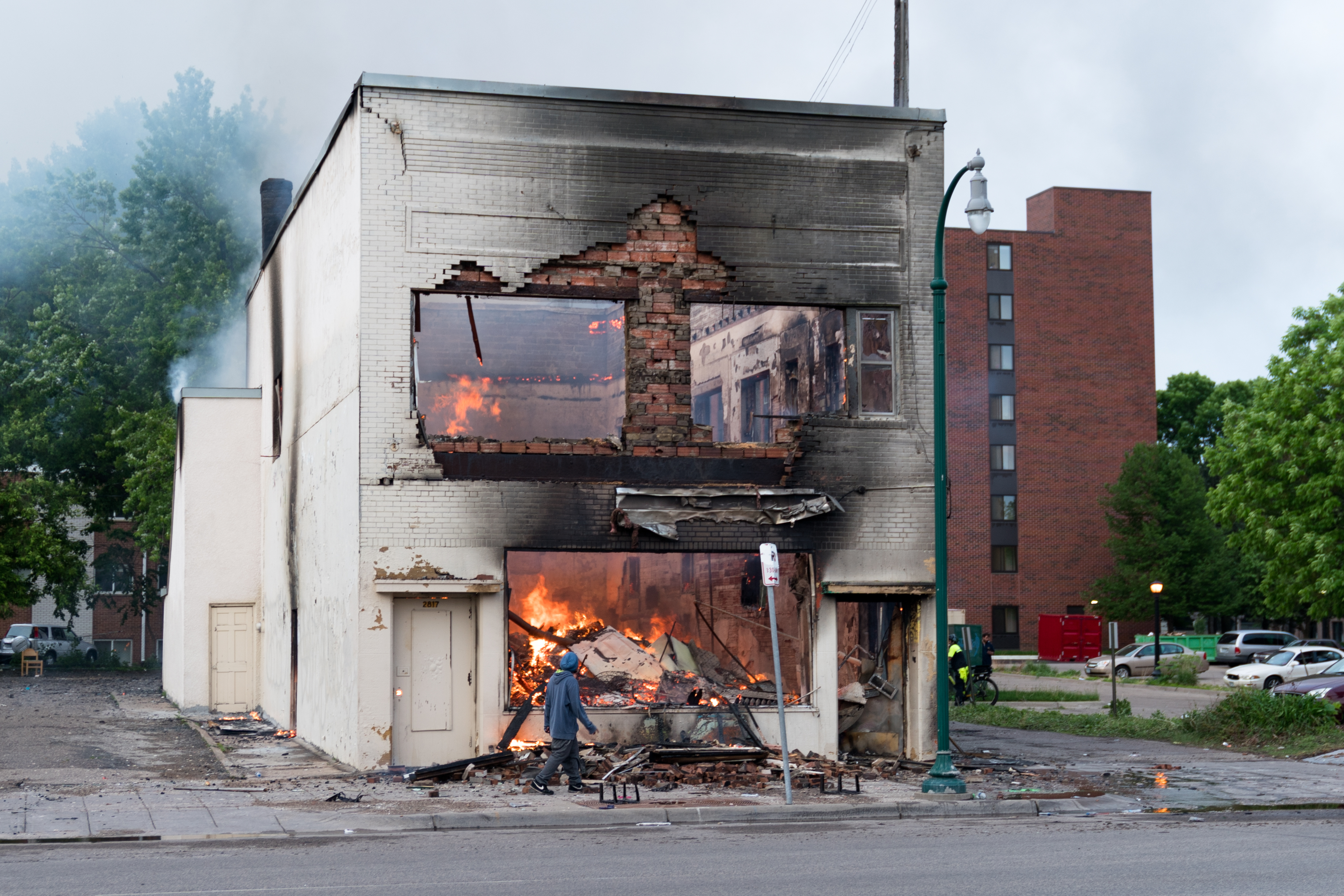
A burning building after a night of rioting in Minneapolis in 2020

Violent crime statistics present a particularly concerning aspect of the city's crime landscape. Minneapolis's violent crime rate of 1,155 crimes per 100,000 residents is more than three times higher than the state average and nearly twice the national average. From 2008 to 2023, there were a total of 73,702 violent crime reported. This included 783 homicides, 7,376 rapes, 27,841 robberies, 37,702 aggravated assaults, and 12,900 domestic assaults. The homicide rate, while fluctuating year to year, remains persistently higher than the national average, increasing significantly in 2020 following the murder of George Floyd.

While black Americans make up 18 percent of Minneapolis' population, they were 77 percent of the city's homicide victims in 2022. Similarly, in 2020, 61 percent of the victims (107 out of 175 victims of whom the race of the victim is known) were African-American (the same report states African-Americans make up less than 10 percent of Minnesota’s total population). During the same year, there were 189 perpetrators of murder for whom a race was identified. Of that total, 66 percent of offenders (125) were identified as being African-American.

In 2023, there were a total of 72 homicides, 303 carjackings, and 413 gunshot wound victims.

Property crime accounts for roughly 80% of all reported offenses in Minneapolis. This includes burglaries, thefts, and motor vehicle thefts. Similar to violent crime, Minneapolis's property crime rate exceeds both the state and national averages. In 2023, there were 7,868 reported motor vehicle thefts reported, up significantly from the previous 3 year average.

From 1 January 2017 to 31 December 2024, Minneapolis Police made a total of 169,187 stops. About 14% resulted in a citation and 9.5% resulted in a vehicle check. 38.6% of those checked were African American, 25.4% were white, 5.8% were East African, 4.8% were Latino, 3.2% were Native American, 1.4% Asian, 3.3% other, and 15.6% of stops did not report race.

Selected crimes in Minneapolis by year
Type	2019	2020	2021	2022	2023	2024
Animal cruelty	33	22	21	19	21	24
Assault	8,964	8,919	8,522	9,410	8,919	9,760
Burglary	3,360	3,971	2,546	2,611	2,617	2,624
Drug-related crime	2,305	1,550	964	1,144	1,351	978
Homicide	54	87	102	87	72	76
Human trafficking	33	25	11	7	14	11
Motor vehicle theft	2,990	4,099	4,263	6,283	7,868	6,666
Robbery	1,321	1,830	2,221	1,798	1,447	1,599

== Types of crime ==
=== Violent crimes ===
Violent crimes include offenses like homicide, assault, and robbery. Violent crimes have shown an increase in recent years. Aggravated assaults surged from 7,131 cases in 2009 to 10,967 in 2021. Murders also increased, albeit at a smaller volume, from 69 in 2009 to 201 in 2021.

=== Property crimes ===
Property crimes such as burglary, theft, and motor vehicle theft are more prevalent but generally less reported. Property crimes like burglary and larceny have mostly declined. Burglaries dropped from 25,165 in 2009 to 14,429 in 2021. Larcenies decreased from 103,695 in 2009 to 88,644 in 2021. However, motor vehicle theft has seen an increase, climbing from 8,379 cases in 2009 to 14,829 in 2021.

== Law enforcement ==
Law enforcement in Minnesota is a collaborative effort between local police departments, county sheriff's offices, and state agencies like the Minnesota Bureau of Criminal Apprehension (BCA). The state also collaborates with federal agencies, such as the FBI and DEA, for more complex investigations.

== Judicial system ==
Minnesota's judicial system operates on a three-tier model, consisting of District Court, the Minnesota Court of Appeals, and the Minnesota Supreme Court. The system is tasked with interpreting and applying the law in criminal cases.

Capital punishment is not used in Minnesota.

== Incarceration ==
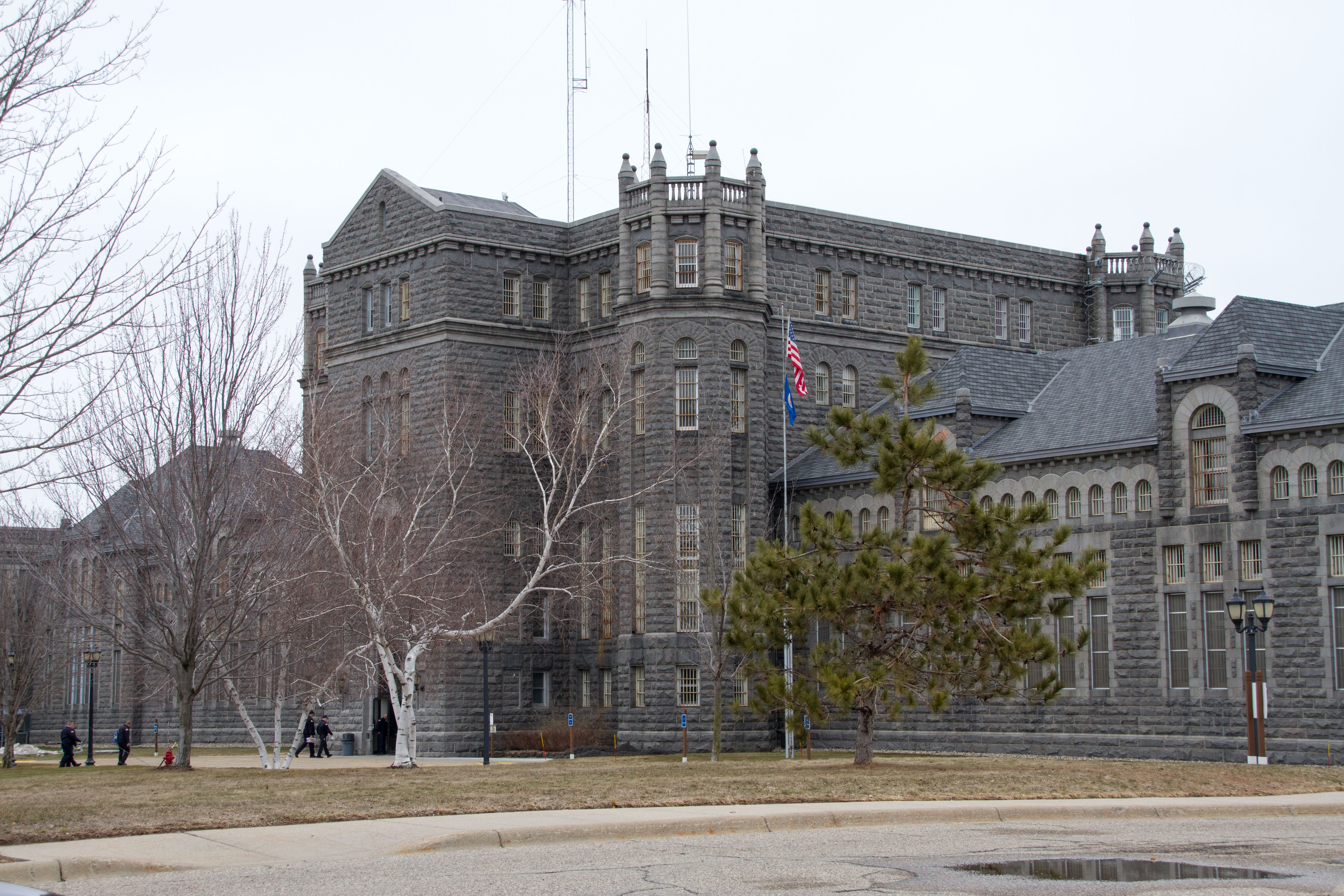
Entrance to the Minnesota Correctional Facility – St. Cloud

Minnesota's prison system is managed by the Minnesota Department of Corrections, overseeing several facilities across the state. In recent years, there has been a focus on reducing recidivism rates through various rehabilitative programs.

=== Prison population ===
As of June 2023, the adult prison population in Minnesota stands at 8,274 individuals, the majority of whom are male (92.7%). The racial composition is diverse, with concentrations of White (50.6%), Black (37.2%), and Native American (9.2%) inmates. When it comes to offenses, the top categories are homicide, criminal sexual conduct, and drug-related crimes, comprising a significant portion of the incarcerated population. Specifically, homicide accounts for 19.2% and criminal sexual conduct for 18.8%. The average age of inmates is approximately 39.6 years, with a significant number (1,526) aged 50 or older.

In terms of educational background, the majority have a high school diploma (67.2%), and most are single (71.0%) by marital status. A plurality identify as Christians (44.2%). During the fiscal year 2023, the prison system admitted 4,871 new individuals. Most admissions were new commitments (68.6%), followed by individuals returning without a new sentence (24.6%). Releases were mostly into supervised release or parole programs, constituting 78.4% of all releases. Among the facilities, Faribault and Stillwater are the largest, housing 23.6% and 14.3% of the population, respectively.

== Crime prevention programs ==
Several crime prevention programs exist within Minnesota, targeting various aspects of criminal activity. Initiatives like neighborhood watch programs, educational campaigns, and drug treatment programs are aimed at reducing both violent and non-violent crimes.

== See also ==
- 2020s Minnesota fraud scandals
- Law of Minnesota
- Organized crime in Minneapolis
- List of law enforcement agencies in Minnesota
- List of United States cities by crime rate
