= Nick Shirley =

American YouTuber (born 2002)

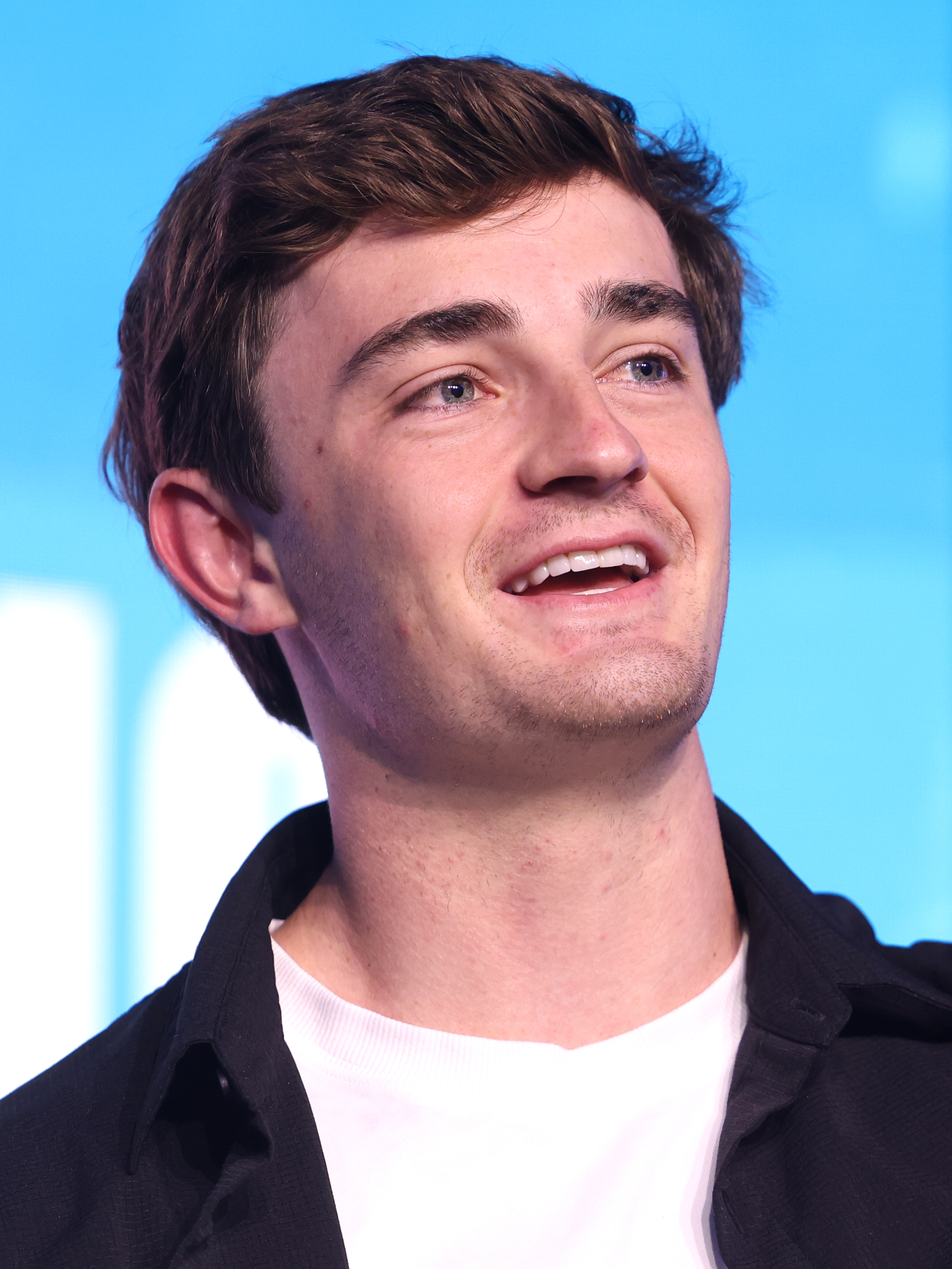
- Shirley in 2026
- Born: April 4, 2002 (age 24)
- Occupations: YouTuber; content creator

X information
- Handle: @nickshirleyy
- Years active: 2017–present
- Followers: 1.5 million

YouTube information
- Channel: @NickShirley
- Years active: 2015–2021; 2023–present
- Subscribers: 1.8 million
- Views: 327 million
- Shirley's voice Shirley testifying on the 2020s Minnesota fraud scandals in the U.S. Congress. Recorded January 21, 2026
- Last updated: May 3, 2026

Nick Shirley (born April 4, 2002) is an American YouTuber and influencer known for street interviews and political videos. In December 2025, his video alleging fraud at Somali-run child care centers in Minnesota went viral. The video showed him visiting facilities that appeared empty or inactive, interviewing bystanders who said they had not seen children at the locations, and citing public payment records. Shirley's central claims that members of the Somali community were operating fake childcare centers or inflating attendance numbers were unsubstantiated. (Note: Sources reporting that Shirley's central claims in the video were unsubstantiated or could not be independently verified include: Treisman, Rachel (December 31, 2025). "What to know about Nick Shirley, the YouTuber alleging daycare fraud in Minnesota". NPR.; Marquez, Alexandra (December 31, 2025). "Trump targets Rep. Ilhan Omar in post attacking Somali immigrants over Minnesota fraud claims". NBC News.; Sottile, Zoe; Rose, Andy; Lybrand, Holmes; Mascarenhas, Lauren (December 30, 2025). "Trump administration freezes child care payments to Minnesota amid federal investigation into alleged fraud". CNN.; Kaplan, Jonah (December 30, 2025). "How a viral video prompted investigations into alleged fraud at day care centers in Minnesota". CBS News.; Meitrodt, Jeffrey; Winter, Deena (December 31, 2025). "We went to the day cares Nick Shirley visited. Here's what we found". Minnesota Star Tribune.; Balingit, Moriah; Kramon, Charlotte (February 1, 2026). "Somali-run child care centers targeted after Minneapolis video". Associated Press.; Ibrahim, Mohamed; Vancleave, Mark; Durkin Richer, Alanna (April 28, 2026). "Federal agents serve search warrants in Minnesota fraud probe". PBS NewsHour.; Christensen, Laerke (May 22, 2026) [December 30, 2025]. "Nick Shirley's investigation into alleged Minnesota day care 'fraud scandal': What we know". Snopes.)

== Early life and education ==
Shirley was raised in Utah, by a family affiliated with the Church of Jesus Christ of Latter-day Saints. He attended Farmington High School in Farmington, Utah, graduating in 2020.

== Career ==
=== Early activities ===
Shirley started his YouTube career as an amateur vlogger and prankster at age 16. Most of his pranks involved his high-school friends, while others included publicity stunts such as disrupting celebrity weddings. He also offered to sell some of his own recorded footage, including of the January 6 attack, to media companies such as CNN and HuffPost. In late 2021, Shirley said he would cease his YouTube activities in order to participate in a religious mission in Chile for the Church of Jesus Christ of Latter-day Saints. He returned to the platform two years later and began producing political content exclusively.

=== Political videos ===
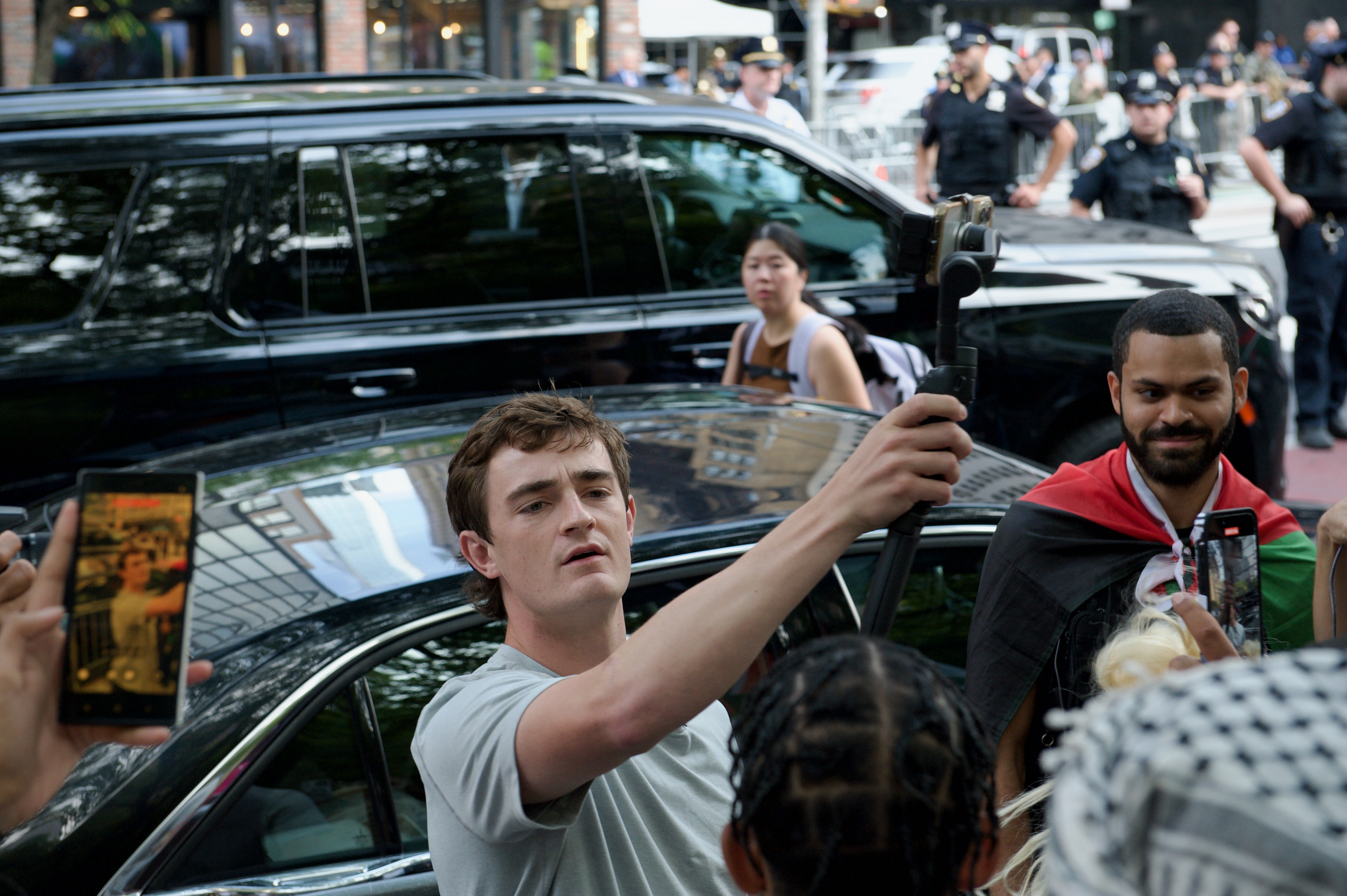
Shirley documenting pro-Palestinian protestors near the opening of the eightieth session of the United Nations General Assembly in September 2025

Shirley's YouTube channel has over 1.1 million subscribers and more than 200 million total views. He is best known for street interviews and direct questions. Some media outlets have described Shirley as right-wing. According to Semafor, Shirley is part of Trump's "new media", a right-wing creator class whose posts have become influential within the second Trump administration, whereas conservative institutional media was more influential during Trump's first term.

Shirley has described himself as an independent journalist. He has received "pushback from some traditional members of the media" for claiming to be a journalist. Statements by Republican lawmakers saying they had "worked with" Shirley on his Minnesota video raised questions about whether he acted independently. Republican legislators had provided information that appeared in the video; one Republican floor leader said they were "ready and willing to provide information ... including some of the information that ended up in that video".

Shirley made multiple videos in support of then-presidential candidate Donald Trump in the months preceding the 2024 U.S. presidential election. He paid a number of Hispanic men $20 each to hold pro-Joe Biden and pro-immigration signs in front of the White House as part of a publicity stunt to support Trump. When asked by Reuters whether he had exploited participants in the video, he said he "wanted to give the migrants an opportunity to voice their opinions". Also in 2024, Shirley released footage from inside the Salvadorian maximum-security prison CECOT, which he praised. In September 2025, Shirley recorded an interview with British political activist Tommy Robinson in which he repeated a false claim that "40,000 British Muslims" on terror watchlists lived in the United Kingdom. Although MI5 maintains a list of 40,000 terror suspects, it does not capture information about their religious affiliation. Shirley has falsely implied that Ukraine had used U.S.-backed funds to buy luxury cars and a Ferris wheel. He has also amplified Trump's false claim that Haitian immigrants were eating pets in Springfield, Ohio.

Shirley at a "Roundtable on ANTIFA"

In October 2025, Shirley participated in a White House roundtable discussion with Trump and other right-wing figures, such as Andy Ngo and Jack Posobiec, on topics including antifa. Shirley claimed in the title of one of his videos that Portland had "fallen" and antifa had "taken control". ICE arrested several people selling watches on Canal Street in Lower Manhattan after he made a video in which he called them "illegal scammers". The Intercept called Shirley's video titles "sensationalized" and wrote that he has platformed "individuals who spread xenophobic and Islamophobic beliefs." CNN has called some of his videos anti-immigrant and anti-Muslim. In an interview with Fox News, Shirley defended his videos, saying, "fraud is fraud—it doesn't matter if it's a Black person, white person, Asian person, Mexican ... and we work too hard simply just to be paying taxes and enabling fraud to be happening." In response to media coverage of his Minnesota fraud video, Shirley wrote on X (formerly Twitter), "I am not an enemy of the people, they are", referring to the mainstream media.

In February 2026, Shirley shared a post by YouTuber Tyler Oliveira promoting an antisemitic video titled "New Jersey's Jewish Invasion", writing, "EXPOSE IT ALL". After some Republicans criticized his support of Oliveira's video, he called out what he described as the "double standards and hypocrisy of half of the 'republican influencer' space" due to their reluctance to support allegations of fraud carried out by Jews but not other ethnic groups. Shirley's support of Oliveira's documentary was published a day after he attended Trump's 2026 State of the Union Address, to which he was invited by Minnesota representative Pete Stauber. In June 2026, Politico reported that references to Polymarket (a prediction market) had begun to appear in Shirley's content "after Shirley started to receive money from Polymarket's chief marketing officer, Matthew Modabber".

=== Allegations of daycare and healthcare fraud in Minnesota ===
On December 26, 2025, Shirley published a video, filmed on December 16, in which he alleged widespread fraud at Somali-run childcare centers and healthcare companies in Minnesota. The video showed him visiting facilities that appeared empty or inactive, interviewing bystanders who said they had not seen children at the locations, and citing public payment records. News organizations and state investigators found no evidence substantiating Shirley's claims that members of the Somali community were operating fake childcare centers. As of December 2025, investigations by state officials had not found evidence of fraud at the sites Shirley visited. On January 30, 2026, state officials said they had "no public information to share" about ongoing fraud investigations into over 100 childcare centers. On February 19, three daycare centers featured in the video sued the Minnesota Department of Children, Youth and Families, alleging that the agency withheld funds and conducted investigations without evidence. Somali-owned businesses reported a surge in harassment and threats after the video came out. The Trump administration cited Shirley's video as justification for increasing ICE enforcement activity in Minnesota under an initiative known as Operation Metro Surge.

After the video's release, the U.S. Department of Homeland Security and Federal Bureau of Investigation increased their presence in the state and federal funding for the childcare centers was frozen. In April, federal agents raided 20 childcare centers in the Twin City Metro area, including those covered in the video. The move was promoted by state officials who said they were working with federal agencies. On May 20, 2026, federal prosecutors charged the owner of the Future Leaders Early Learning center with one count of wire fraud and one count of conspiracy to defraud the United States through Minnesota's Child Care Assistance Program. The business was one of the centers shown in Shirley's video. In July 2026, one daycare owner featured in the video, Fahima Mahamud, pleaded guilty to $4.6 million in daycare fraud and $850,000 in the Feeding Our Future scam. Prosecutors did not accuse Mahamud of inflating attendance figures. She admitted to failing to collect required family co-payments while collecting reimbursement through the childcare-assistance program.

=== California reporting and lawsuit ===
After his reporting in Minnesota, Shirley began using undercover video to investigate taxpayer-funded programs in California. He alleged fraud involving migrant crisis resources, voter systems, and immigrant-run hospice and daycare facilities. In August 2026, Governor Gavin Newsom signed California Assembly Bill 2624, which its opponents dubbed the "Stop Nick Shirley Act". The legislation, officially known as the Safe at Work Act, was intended to protect immigration support service providers from doxxing, harassment, and threats. It allows eligible participants to keep their personal information confidential in public records. On September 4, 2026, Shirley filed a federal lawsuit against Attorney General Bonta and Secretary of State Shirley Weber, alleging that AB 2624 is an unconstitutional, content-based restriction on speech that violates the First and Fourteenth Amendments and could impose civil liability for publishing lawfully obtained information.

=== Seattle fraud accusation and retraction ===
In October 2026, Shirley published a video in which he falsely accused the Seattle-based Lam's Seafood Asian Market of EBT fraud. After publishing the video, he called for the FBI, the Department of Justice and the White house to investigate the store. In the following month, he published a video in which he said: "I have not uncovered any evidence that Lam's itself engaged in EBT fraud. It was never my intention to make incorrect claims that Lam's engaged or has engaged in EBT fraud."

According to the company, Shirley's video, which had garnered millions of views before it was taken down, caused them to lose customers and partnerships. The company said that Shirley's retraction came after it sent him a cease and desist letter, after which Washington law would allow him to publish a retraction within 30 days to mitigate any future defamation claims. The company said Shirley had published his retraction exactly 30 days after receiving their letter.

== Media appearances ==
On December 30, 2025, CNN correspondent Whitney Wild interviewed Shirley outside a Minneapolis daycare center for Anderson Cooper 360, questioning his investigative methods and asking how he knew his allegations were true. Shirley responded, "We showed you guys what was happening, and then you guys can go ahead and make your own analysis."
