= Burnsville shooting =

Burnsville shooting may refer to:

- 2024 Burnsville shooting
- Murder of Katherine Ann Olson, actually shot in neighboring Savage but whose body was found in Burnsville
