= Donald Blom =

American convicted murderer and suspected serial killer (1949–2023)

- Born: Donald Albin Pince; February 5, 1949; Minnesota, U.S.
- Died: January 10, 2023 (aged 73); Oak Park Heights Prison, Oak Park Heights, Minnesota, U.S.
- Other names: Donald Aubin Hutchinson, Donald Albin Prince, Timothy Edward Whitmore, John Fitzgerald Koppel, John Koppels, Dennis Allen Franklin
- Convictions: First-degree murder; Criminal possession of a weapon; Five convictions for sex offenses that involved kidnapping or sexual assault
- Penalty: Life imprisonment without the possibility of parole plus 19 years

Details
- Victims: 1 convicted, 2–4+ suspected
- Span of crimes: 1970s–1999
- Country: United States
- State: Minnesota (confirmed)
- Date apprehended: For the final time on June 22, 1999

Donald Albin Blom (born Donald Albin Pince, February 5, 1949 – January 10, 2023) was an American man convicted of the murder of Katie Poirier in 1999. A registered sex offender involved in five cases of kidnapping and sexual assault prior to Poirier's murder, he was suspected of being a serial killer by case investigators.

Starting in 2021, Blom served his prison sentence at MCF-Oak Park Heights, a maximum-security facility in Stillwater, Minnesota. Before that he spent about 4 years at medium-security prison MCF-Faribault after having been transferred there from maximum-security facility SCI Greene in Pennsylvania.

== Early life ==
Donald Blom's father abused him from the time Blom was very young until he was around 13 years old. By the time he reached adolescence, Blom was a heavy drinker and exhibited behavioral problems. In the 10th grade, he went to a reform school, where he often skipped classes.

In 1975, Blom kidnapped a 14-year-old girl, gagged her and raped her. He locked her in his car trunk, but she managed to escape and turn him in. Blom was tried and convicted. In 1978, he committed aggravated assault. In 1983, he was arrested for criminal sexual conduct. The same year, he threatened two teenage girls at knifepoint in a remote area, tied them to a tree and put socks in their mouths. He choked and revived one of them several times and said he was going to rape them. The girls were rescued when a police officer saw their car parked the wrong way and investigated. Blom fled into the woods and later changed his appearance by dyeing his hair. He was arrested two months later when one of the girls recognized him. He pleaded guilty to the crime.

During an examination in 1992, a psychologist predicted that if Blom was not closely monitored, he would probably engage in additional antisocial behavior; however, Blom managed to change his name, get a job and get married. By May 1999, he had six felony convictions, five of which involved kidnapping and sexual assault.

== Katie Poirier's murder ==
On May 26, 1999, 19-year-old Katie Elizabeth Poirier went missing from D. J.'s Expressway Conoco convenience store in Moose Lake, Minnesota, where she worked nights as a clerk. A passer-by, who noticed that there was no attendant present in the store, reported the incident. A grainy black-and-white surveillance video showed Poirier being forced out of the store around 11:40 pm by a man wearing jeans, a backwards baseball cap and a New York Yankees baseball jersey with the number 23 on the back. The man's hand was at the back of Poirier's neck, and from the way she touched her throat, there might have been a cord tied around her neck. The video was sent to imaging specialists at NASA who were able to enhance the image so more details of the suspect could be seen. The police estimated that the abductor was 5'10" and weighed around 170 pounds, had long light-colored hair and appeared to be around 25 years old.

Witnesses reported that they had seen a black pick-up truck circling the area around the convenience store that evening. One of the witnesses gave a partial license plate number (three numbers and a letter). Another witness reported seeing a suspicious man leering at female passersby outside a Subway restaurant in the same building as the convenience store earlier that night. The suspect was allegedly driving the same black pick-up truck other witnesses had described. Based on this and three other witness statements, a composite sketch of the abductor was broadcast by local media.

=== Blom's arrest ===
Blom was investigated soon after Poirier's disappearance since he was the registered owner of a pickup truck with a license plate number matching the partial number provided by a witness.

Blom was working at the Minnesota Veteran's Home under the name "Donald Hutchinson" prior to Poirier's death. On June 18, his former co-worker, Darrel Brown, called the police tip line and said Donald Hutchinson looked similar to the man in the composite sketch provided by police. Brown said Hutchinson was absent on the day after Poirier's abduction, had recently cut his hair, had stopped driving his black pick-up truck and without notice quit his job as a janitor.

Blom owned a 20-acre property in Moose Lake, 12 miles from the convenience store from which Poirier was abducted. Investigators learned of Blom's prior convictions for abducting seven young girls. They also learned from Blom's neighbors that Blom spent a lot of time at the property before Poirier's abduction, but had not been there since.

Blom was spending time with his family at a campground 140 miles from his home in Richfield, Minnesota, when initially questioned by agents from Minnesota's Bureau of Criminal Apprehension on June 22. He was arrested later that day while driving home. Blom was friendly and cooperative, but refused to give a statement and requested an attorney. He was initially held in a county facility, but was placed in solitary confinement after his plans to escape from the facility were discovered.

Investigators obtained search warrants and searched Blom's Richfield residence and Moose Lake property. The search in Moose Lake was supported by over 100 National Guardsmen and several hundred local volunteers who were initially unable to find any trace of Poirier. They did find some firearms, which Blom was not allowed to carry given his prior convictions.

On the second day of the search, investigators found what appeared to be bone fragments in a fire pit on Blom's property. The fragments were sent to a lab, where they were identified as human bone and a charred portion of a human tooth. DNA tests proved inconclusive, but an examination by dental experts established that the filling on this tooth matched that of a very rare filling material used by Poirier's dentist. The examination showed the tooth belonged to a young female and was likely Poirier's.

On September 8, Blom confessed to abducting Poirier, strangling her and burning her body in the fire pit on his Moose Lake property, an account which was somewhat inconsistent with the evidence. Surveillance video from the convenience store showed a man with his hand on the back of Poirier's neck. Blom stated that he walked out of the store with Poirier and said she asked him to let her go several times, but did not fight with him until he started choking her at his property. Blom also said that he killed Poirier with his bare hands and burned her body with wood and paper. According to investigators, wood and paper alone would not have been sufficient to reduce a human body to ash. Blom denied sexually assaulting Poirier and said he did not know why he had committed the crime. When asked whether the remains in the fire pit were those of Poirer, he said, "I guess so". When pressed, he said he "didn't know the answer to this question." When asked whose remains they were, Blom replied, "Well, I was asking that myself, man."

Blom soon recanted, saying that the stress of the solitary confinement and hallucinations due to "ten medications" had prompted him to make a false confession.

=== Trial ===
Blom's trial began in June 2000. Over 50 witnesses were called to testify during the case. Video surveillance, witness reports, testimonies from two women who Blom kidnapped in 1983 and his confession were presented as evidence against him.

Blom said he never owned a New York Yankees jersey with the number 23 on the back like the one worn by the man in the surveillance video; however, Blom's brother testified that he had given the Blom family a box of old clothing which included a Yankees jersey. The two women who Blom kidnapped in 1983 and who resembled Poirier as children testified about what he had done to them. Forensic odontologist Dr. Ann Norrlander testified that the tooth portion recovered from Blom's property was consistent with Poirier's age, gender and dental work. Blom's barber confirmed that Blom's hair had blond tips at the time of the abduction, making him appear younger (the man in the surveillance video was assumed to be around 25 years old while Blom was 50 at the time of the crime).

Blom's defense attorney, Rodney Brodin, presented Blom's wife, Amy, as his first witness on August 7. She testified that Blom returned home at 9:30 on the night of Poirier's disappearance, they went to bed and when she woke up in the morning, a pot of coffee had been made; therefore, she believed, Blom had been home the entire night. She also accused the police of threatening to take her children away if she did not answer questions the way they wanted. She also denied seeing any baseball jersey in the clothing given to the family by Blom's brother. Brodin restated to the jurors that only one of six witnesses was able to identify Blom in a line-up. He also called upon his own odontologist to counter the testimony of the prosecution's dental experts. He stated that Blom's earlier confession was a mistake and should not be taken into account. He claimed that another man had confessed to the crime, but was not arrested.

During his trial, Blom expressed angrily to Poirier's family that he was not guilty and had a heated exchange of words with Poirier's mother. On August 10, he denied kidnapping Poirier. He said his wife had threatened to commit suicide due to media pressure and that he confessed to the kidnapping in order to get out of his cell. He said he had been fishing at Moose Lake on the evening of the kidnapping and returned home by 10:00 pm, well before the time of Poirier's abduction.

The prosecutor, Thomas Pertler, cross examined Blom about his confession, but Blom gave only "yes" or "no" answers. Blom also said he had never seen the baseball jersey before and that people who claimed to have seen him wear it were mistaken.

After much deliberation, Blom was convicted of first-degree murder and sentenced to life without parole. He was also given a 19-year sentence for possession of firearms found at his property.

=== Aftermath ===
By the time of Blom's conviction, over $200,000 had been spent on the case. The state legislature strengthened Minnesota sex offender laws with longer prison terms for repeat offenders, a bill informally known as "Katie’s Law."

Blom appealed his conviction. His wife emailed two Minnesota legislators, stating that she believed him to be Poirier's murderer and that Blom abused her for seven years. She said she did not know when she married Blom that he had been married twice before, and that when Blom adopted her surname, she was flattered, not knowing he did so to conceal his past. She said Blom went to the Moose Lake property frequently and told her little. She believed that he had committed other crimes, including murder. No longer under his domination, she said she could tell the truth: he was not home on the night of Poirier's kidnapping. Blom's sons confirmed the violent abuse, describing his wife's injuries.

In 2004, an appeals court upheld Blom's conviction. In 2006, Blom expressed his willingness to answer questions about unsolved local crimes in exchange for transfer to a prison closer to his relatives. When detectives arrived with the transfer letter, Blom talked about other matters for three days and a confession never materialized.

In December 2007, the Minnesota Supreme Court rejected Blom's third petition for a new hearing.

== Possible links to other crimes ==
Investigators believe Blom may have been involved in a series of murders, possibly dating back to the 1970s. They believe that his modus operandi was to change his name and appearance after each incident. Dennis Fier, a Minnesota Bureau of Criminal Apprehension agent, has long suspected Blom to be a serial killer. According to Fier, Blom admitted that he "often would leave for entire nights, would be using alcohol and drugs and would not remember when he came home the next day, where he had been or what he did."

At the time of his arrest, investigators were looking at similar crimes, including the murder of 19-year-old Wisconsin student Holly Spangler. In 1993, Spangler's decomposed body was found in the woods of a Bloomington, Minnesota, park. Blom was living in the area under the name "Donald Pince," was a registered sex offender and was one of the top suspects in the case.

Another case studied by investigators was the strangulation of Wilma Johnson, whose body was found near St. Paul Cathedral in 1983. Blom admitted to being at the crime scene, but denied killing Johnson.

Blom told investigators he might have killed a man near St. Paul's High Bridge, but a body was never found.

== In popular culture ==
The story of Poirier's murder has been the subject of many television true crime documentaries. Court TV documented the story in the Forensic Files series episode "Tooth or Consequences". The Discovery Channel reported the case via The New Detectives series episode "Fatal Abductions". In 2010, the case was featured in the "Out of the Ashes" episode of the Investigation Discovery series Extreme Forensics. In 2013, a second Investigation Discovery series On the Case with Paula Zahn aired the "Tip 1960" episode about the crime. In 2016, a third Investigation Discovery series See No Evil episode titled "Snatched on Camera" reported on Poirier's murder.

== See also ==
- Crime in Minnesota
- List of murder convictions without a body
