= 2020s Minnesota fraud scandals =

Scandals and allegations about US state programs

A series of fraud scandals and allegations concerning federal funds to Minnesota state-administered social services programs occurred during the 2020s. The largest and earliest case is the Feeding Our Future case, in which charges were first brought in 2022. Feeding Our Future was a nonprofit that claimed to provide meals to schoolchildren during the COVID-19 pandemic. By July 2026, out of 80 suspects indicted in the case, 69 had been convicted, including more than 60 via plea deals. Seven had been convicted at trial, while many others awaited trial. Estimates of the total Feeding Our Future losses range from $250 million to $350 million.

Amid ongoing investigation into the Feeding Our Future case, potential fraud was identified and investigated in a number of other state-run social services schemes, including emergency housing, autism therapy for children, home health assistance, and Medicaid. State lawmakers passed some bipartisan anti-fraud measures in the 2025 Minnesota legislative session. By late 2025, Minnesota had shut down its housing stabilization system and paused payments in 14 Medicaid programs, including autism therapy, while launching an audit. In 2026, the state created a fully independent Office of Inspector General in Minnesota to investigate fraud, as well as funding additional inspectors and other anti-fraud measures.

In December 2025, a viral video by YouTuber Nick Shirley, which includes limited evidence for the allegations, ignited new allegations of social services frauds at Somali-American daycare centers and health care companies. Shirley previously built a following with anti-immigrant videos. The Department of Health and Human Services froze all federal childcare payments to Minnesota, and new state and federal investigations and legal proceedings were initiated in response to the video's publicity. Citing a lack of time and a need to focus on his work, Tim Walz, the governor of Minnesota who had been seeking reelection in 2026, withdrew his bid for a third term, and later accepted responsibility for state agencies he oversaw failing to stop fraud sooner.

== Fraud cases ==
=== Feeding Our Future ===
Feeding Our Future was founded by Aimee Bock in 2016. It repeatedly applied for grants from the state of Minnesota but was denied due to allegations of mismanagement and abuses. In July 2019, months before the COVID-19 pandemic, Minnesota Department of Education (MDE) officials identified early signs of fraud, including meal claims they considered implausible. According to former state employees, Bock pressured workers who raised questions within weeks of the organization's first submissions, and officials began documenting her "concerning behavior". Before the pandemic, Feeding Our Future billed the state for approximately $3.4 million.

The IRS revoked Feeding Our Future's tax status as a nonprofit in February 2020. After the onset of the pandemic and a large increase in the amount of federal aid available, Feeding Our Future applied for funding to provide meals to schoolchildren, as schools were closed. Some experienced MDE employees, suspicious of potential fraud, sought to investigate meal sites. The employees felt that their efforts were stymied by MDE leadership, which they called reluctant to take action for fear of litigation. MDE began giving Feeding Our Future substantial grants after it threatened legal action against the state.

After MDE began delaying responses to Feeding Our Future's grant applications, the organization sued the state in November 2020, arguing that it was being discriminated against "because of race, national origin, color, and religion". Katherine Theisen, a senior employee of Minnesota's Office of the Legislative Auditor, later called MDE's response "a systemic failure." Feeding Our Future's political supporters, including both Democratic and Republican state senators, advocated for the organization to receive funding or passed along constituent concerns that MDE was blocking grants. MDE raised concerns about fraud with the United States Department of Agriculture (USDA), and the FBI began investigating in February 2021. Bock maintained ties with local politicians, including Minneapolis mayor Jacob Frey and state senator Omar Fateh. An aide to Frey, Abdi Salah, pleaded guilty to wire fraud; Frey said he was unaware of Salah's activities. Another supporter was Minneapolis council member Jamal Osman, whose wife operated a Feeding Our Future meal site that received more than $400,000 in funding. In December 2021, a group of Feeding Our Future operators met with Minnesota Attorney General Keith Ellison, saying they were facing discrimination by state agencies. Ellison told them he would look into their claims, but took no further action; he later released a statement saying they had "tried to exploit [his] good faith engagement, but they were not successful."

In March 2021, Feeding Our Future sued MDE to resume payments. In April, Ramsey County District Judge John Guthmann ruled that MDE acted too quickly in halting payments and lifted the payment freeze. MDE and Governor Walz decided that the court ruling forced them to resume payments to Feeding Our Future. MDE said, "the court made it clear that if MDE were to continue the legal fight to withhold payments, MDE would incur sanctions and legal penalties". Guthmann issued a rare public rebuke in response to Walz's statements, saying he never ordered MDE to resume payments to Feeding our Future and that MDE had itself determined that Feeding Our Future had resolved "serious deficiencies" that justified its initial payment freeze. After Guthmann's ruling, MDE continued to reject applications for new meal sites from Feeding Our Future and contacted the FBI. In June 2021, state senator Omar Fateh praised Bock and Feeding our Future for securing funding against MDE's payment freeze. A witness in a Feeding our Future trial testified that Fateh called Attorney General Ellison on behalf of Feeding Our Future. Also in 2021, Frey met with MDE to push MDE Commissioner Heather Mueller into restarting funding. Bock had prepared talking points for the meeting, which were delivered to Frey through Salah, although Frey denied using them during the meeting.

In January 2022, FBI raids began targeting Feeding Our Future, which finally stopped payments to the organization. Politicians who received donations from suspects implicated in Feeding Our Future, including Frey, Fateh, and U.S. Representative Ilhan Omar, returned or donated their contributions. By July 2026, of 80 suspects indicted in the fraud, 69 had been convicted, including 62 via plea deals. Seven had been convicted at trial, while many others awaited trial. Although more than $250 million is alleged to have been stolen, only around $75 million had been recovered as of early 2025, as much of the money was spent on unrecoverable expenses like luxury meals and hotels or was transferred to overseas investments that the U.S. cannot seize. Joe Thompson, the lead federal prosecutor, estimated that total fraud from the case could approach $500 million. As most perpetrators, excluding Bock, were Somali Americans, the scandal increased attention on the community, including from the second Trump administration. In May 2026, Bock was sentenced to more than 41 years imprisonment (500 months) and ordered to pay over $240 million in restitution.

Merrick Garland, attorney general during the Biden administration, called it the country's largest pandemic relief fraud scheme. The nonpartisan state legislative auditor's office later found that Feeding our Future's threats to accuse MDE of racism had affected the agency's judgment. An investigator from the state's fraud investigation office (who was himself Somali) said that concerns over being portrayed as racist made the Walz administration reluctant to pursue fraud allegations. Federal officials began investigations into Early Intensive Developmental and Behavioral Intervention (EIDBI) (Note: Early Intensive Developmental and Behavioral Intervention (EIDBI) is a Minnesota Department of Human Services program which funds services for children diagnosed with autism spectrum disorder, including early intensive behavioral intervention.) providers in December 2024, in connection with Feeding our Future investigations. At least a dozen defendants suspected of fraud related to Feeding our Future also owned or were associated with autism centers in Minnesota. Federal officials charged several defendants in connection with EIDBI fraud in 2025. In December 2025, Asha Farhan Hassan pleaded guilty to stealing $14 million in EIDBI funding.

=== Integrated Community Supports ===
Minnesota's Integrated Community Supports (ICS) program launched in 2021, intended to aid adults with disabilities. It initially cost the state $4.6 million a year when it launched in 2021, but "explosively grew" to nearly $180 million in 2025. Fraudulent providers for ICS were suspected of failing to provide services that they billed to Minnesota. Lack of care has been connected to the death of at least one participant in ICS. Rick Clemmer, an ICS enrollee, died in 2025 from a medical emergency with nobody around to call for emergency services. His ICS provider, Abdul Ibrahim of Ultimate Home Health Services LLC, claimed he only checked on Clemmer once a day, despite Ultimate Home Health Services billing Minnesota for 12 hours of one on one care daily. In 2025, at least 17 providers were suspended by DHS due to credible allegations of fraud.

In December 2025, the FBI raided Ultimate Home Health Services LLC, alleging that it billed for services that were never provided. In May 2026, federal prosecutors indicted the owner of Ultimate Home Health on fraud charges of $1.4 million.

=== Substance use disorder services ===
Evergreen Recovery, a substance use disorder services provider, billed for 203 hours of services provided by a single employee in a day. KARE11, a local TV station, broke the story in May 2024 after a whistleblower contacted them after she received no response from reporting Evergreen to DHS for months. Evergreen's CEO and CFO plead guilty to conspiracy to commit wire fraud in October 2025.

Kyros, a for-profit company, was Minnesota's largest provider for addiction peer recovery services. It was founded by Daniel Larson, who also founded the nonprofit Refocus Recovery. For-profit companies like Kyros may not bill Medicaid for peer recovery services, but nonprofits like Refocus Recovery are able to. While nominally independent, 96% of Refocus Recovery's revenue went to subsidiaries of Kyros in 2022, effectively allowing Kyros to bill Medicaid through Refocus Recovery. The Alliance for Recovery Centered Organizations (ARCO) reported irregularities between Kyros and Refocus Recovery in 2022, but DHS granted certification for Refocus to continue billing Medicaid after the nonprofit directly appealed to DHS commissioner Jodi Harpstead. A March 2024 KARE11 investigation found that Refocus Recovery also billed for services never provided and questionable services, like watching movies. DHS halted payments to Refocus Recovery in September 2024 and Kyros subsequently shut down.

Nuway Alliance, a nonprofit that served as one of the state's largest addiction treatment providers, was accused of obtaining tens of millions of excess Medicaid payments by exploiting billing rules which allowed any amount over 30 minutes of services to be billed as an hour, resulting in double-billing of services in overlapping periods of time. Nuway would provide services for 35 minutes, bill for an hour, then provide another 35 minutes of services after a 10-minute break. Internal records from Nuway indicated that officials identified the billing practices as problematic. It was also alleged to have used illegal kickbacks by providing free housing as an incentive to recruit patients into its addiction recovery services. DHS halted payments to Nuway in February 2025. In June 2025, Nuway paid $18.5 million in a settlement to the US Attorney's Office, without admitting guilt.

=== Home and Community Based Services ===
In January 2023, the offices of Home and Community Based Services (HCBS) provider Bridges MN were investigated by DHS for fraudulently billing $4 million in Medicaid funds. Prior to the investigation, Bridges had received two years of warning notices that its practices could be considered fraudulent, since they provided in-home health care to client who were living in residences that Bridges or its affiliates owned or had financial interests in, when Medicaid required that clients live in their own home. DHS investigators discovered that Bridges also had wide discrepancies between what they billed and the services they provided, including instances of 24 hours of services being billed in a day.

In June 2024, the Minnesota Attorney General's office charged two defendants, Abdifatah Yusuf and his wife Lul Ahmed, of defrauding $7.2 million through a fake HCBS company called Promise Health Services LLC. The two were accused of overbilling, billing for services not provided, forging documentation, and recruiting HCBS clients through kickbacks. The couple allegedly spent Medicaid funds on personal luxury items. Yusuf was convicted by a jury in August 2025, but his conviction was subsequently overturned by Hennepin County Judge Sarah West. Judge West stated that while she was "troubled by the manner in which fraud was able to be perpetuated at Promise Health", she issued the acquittal because the state's case "relied heavily on circumstantial evidence" and there could be other "reasonable inferences". The jury foreperson in the trial expressed shock at the decision, stating, "It was not a difficult decision whatsoever. The deliberation took probably four hours at most. Based off of the state's evidence that was presented, it was beyond a reasonable doubt".

=== Personal Care Assistance ===
In August 2023, 18 people involved in a Personal Care Assistance (PCA) company were charged in what the Attorney General's Office described as the largest case of fraud brought forward by its Medicaid Fraud Control Unit, which involved $9.5 million in stolen Medicaid funds through a fraudulent company, MN Professional. MN Professional was accused of billing Medicaid for services that were not provided and providing services without a nurse or qualified professional present. Prosecutors described the fraud as being concealed through an "elaborate cash-checking scheme" in which checks were written in the names of legitimate PCAs, whose identities were used to bill fraudulently by suspects that kept the money for themselves.

In October 2023, several other PCA companies came under investigation by the Attorney General's office. They were found to have ties to Abdirashid Said, a PCA provider who was convicted in 2021 of theft by swindle. The companies were frequently located in the same buildings as each other and were typically run by individuals with family connections. KARE11 reported that the PCA fraud investigation was predominantly centered on Minneapolis's Somali community.

In June 2024, the Attorney General's office charged Abdiweli Mohamud for PCA fraud in connection with Abdifatah Yusuf and Lul Ahmed's HCBS scheme. Mohamud operated Minnesota Home, which was accused of fraudulently billing Medicaid for $1.8 million.

== Viral video and national attention ==
=== YouTube video ===
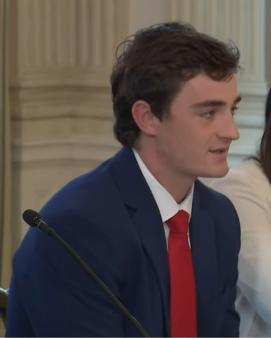
Nick Shirley, who filmed the viral video alleging fraud at Somali-run daycare centers

On December 26, 2025, YouTuber Nick Shirley published a video in which he alleged fraud at Somali-American-run child care centers. His video shows him visiting facilities that appeared empty or inactive, interviewing bystanders who said they had not seen children at the locations, and citing public payment records. Shirley had previously created anti-immigrant and anti-Muslim videos. In the video, he visits the sites with David Hoch, a right-wing lobbyist who has run unsuccessfully for Minnesota governor and attorney general.

In the video, Shirley and Hoch also enter a business plaza in the Ventura Village neighborhood and enter several businesses "asking for healthcare". The video included limited evidence for the allegations. In December 2025, state officials visited the centers featured in Shirley's video and found that they all had children present and had an active license with the state. Shirley and Hoch alleged that childcare centers have defrauded the government of millions of dollars by not holding their established capacity of children. Most childcare centers do not enroll up to capacity.

Hoch's inclusion in the video as a primary source was questioned; the Minnesota Star Tribune and The Intercept later reported that Hoch had a history of posting racist and anti-immigrant content on Instagram, including a post reading "Even the Blacks have had enough of the demon Muslims". NBC News called the allegations "unsubstantiated", while CNN said the video includes limited evidence for its allegations and that Shirley had created anti-immigrant and anti-Muslim videos in the past. Shirley defended his videos, saying, "fraud is fraud". Minnesota House speaker Lisa Demuth said the Republican caucus had been "working with Nick Shirley and agency whistleblowers" to hold Governor Walz "accountable". State representative Harry Niska said the party had given Hoch information. Hoch told CNN he obtained the information from publicly available websites, not from Republican politicians.

=== Quality Learning Center ===
At Quality Learning Center, Shirley cited locked doors, a misspelled sign, and a nearly empty parking lot. A bystander told him he had never seen children at the facility. "This is Quality 'Learing' Center", Shirley said, pointing to the sign. "They spelled 'learning' wrong." The center's manager, Ibrahim Ali, published a video claiming that Shirley's video was dishonest. He said the video was recorded outside operating hours; the center is open Monday through Thursday from 2 to 10 p.m., and he alleged Shirley arrived around 11 a.m. Ali said the center serves 50 to 80 children daily and employs about 25 people. On December 31, KSTP observed "a steady stream of kids and parents" at Quality Learning Center. By January 7, the center voluntarily ceased operations. According to Minnesota House Speaker Lisa Demuth, the center had already been mentioned by the House fraud committee in February 2025 as an "apparently vacant site". The center received $1.9 million of the state's funding in fiscal year 2025 and nearly $10 million since 2019.

=== Other centers ===
Minnesota childcare workers Umi Hassan and Ahmed Hasan said Shirley's video was politically motivated. Mini Childcare Center manager Ayan Jama said Shirley had visited the facility early in the morning, before it opened at noon; that the facility had received a bomb threat, which police confirmed; and that a suspect attempted to break into the facility.

Many Minnesota childcare employees reported receiving threatening phone calls after the video's publication. Washington State Attorney General Nick Brown said he had received reports of Somali-run "daycare providers being harassed and accused of fraud with little to no fact-checking" in his state. Police in Columbus, Ohio, responded to at least three reports of people attempting to visit Somali-operated daycare centers. Mayor Andrew Ginther called it a "trend" of trespassing and harassment and warned residents to report any more unlawful behavior.

Nokomis Daycare Center in Minneapolis, which was not among the facilities featured in Shirley's video, reported a break-in on December 30. Manager Nasrulah Mohamed said documents related to children and employees were stolen and attributed the incident to backlash from the video. He said the center had reported the incident to police and continued to receive threatening messages.

=== State government and media investigations ===
In January 2025, KSTP reported that the Minnesota Department of Human Services's Office of the Inspector General had 62 active investigations into childcare centers in the state's Child Care Assistance Program. Five of the 10 childcare centers featured in Shirley's video had operated as meal distribution sites for Feeding Our Future, receiving nearly $5 million between 2018 and 2021. None of them had been accused of wrongdoing in the Feeding Our Future case.

Minnesota Department of Children, Youth, and Families Commissioner Tikki Brown said officials "do take the concerns that the video raises about fraud very seriously" while questioning "some of the methods that were used in the video". She said all the daycare centers in the video had been inspected in the previous six months and that children were present during those inspections; that ongoing investigations into several of the centers had not uncovered evidence of fraud; and that two centers had closed, including Quality Learning Center. A DCYF spokeswoman later said Quality Learning Center had notified the state it planned to close but then reversed that decision; the department also clarified that the second center, Mako Childcare Center, had closed in 2022. On January 30, 2026, state officials said they had "no public information to share" about ongoing fraud investigations into over 150 facilities.

State records showed Sweet Angel Child Care had an unannounced inspection on December 4, 2025; a CBS News review found safety and cleanliness violations but no evidence of fraud. On December 30, journalists from the Minnesota Star Tribune visited all 10 childcare centers featured in Shirley's video. They found children inside four facilities that allowed them entry, including "about 50" at Minnesota Child Care Center. The remaining six were either closed or did not open their doors. A KSTP review of state licensing records found all the facilities Shirley visited had active licenses except for two that appeared to be permanently closed. The records showed the centers had between three and 10 safety violations; licensing records do not document fraud allegations or attendance. At the state-licensed ABC Learning Center, security camera footage shared with CBS News showed "various people throughout the day dropping off young children" on the same day Shirley had visited and said it was empty. At another center, a CNN camera crew filmed caregivers arriving with children while interviewing Shirley outside; he dismissed them as "showing face".

== Government responses ==
=== State government ===
In 2023, state lawmakers created an Office of Inspector General within the Minnesota Department of Education, describing it as having the "investigatory power" that was lacking during the Feeding Our Future case. They also enacted regulatory changes increasing documentation requirements for social services providers. State lawmakers also passed some bipartisan anti-fraud measures in the 2025 legislative session. In January 2025, Walz announced a task force to combat fraud, saying that his administration "had a culture of being a little too trusting". In October 2025, Walz's administration ordered that 14 "high-risk" Medicaid programs be audited and paused for up to 90 days "only if anomalies are found". Shireen Gandhi, the temporary Minnesota DHS commissioner, wrote to the federal government that these programs had been identified due to "vulnerabilities, evidence of fraudulent activity, or data analytics that revealed potentially suspicious patterns, claim anomalies, or outliers". By late 2025, Minnesota had shut down its housing stabilization system and paused payments in 14 Medicaid programs, including autism therapy, while launching an audit.

Deputy Secretary of Health and Human Services Jim O'Neill announced a freeze on $185 million in federal child care funding to Minnesota. On December 31, the Department of Health and Human Services announced it would freeze childcare funding for all 50 states until each state could "prove" the funds were "being spent legitimately". In February 2026, the Minnesota Department of Human Services announced it was recruiting over 150 temporary employees to help perform a comprehensive check of all 5,800 providers in the high-risk Medicaid-funded programs, including unannounced site visits, screening reviews, and other actions. The department's deputy commissioner announced the "revalidation" program as a significant change from the usual cadence of revalidation every 3–5 years and also instituted a general system of prepayment review.

In 2026, the state created a fully independent Office of Inspector General in Minnesota to investigate fraud, as well as funding additional inspectors and other anti-fraud measures.

=== Governor Tim Walz ===
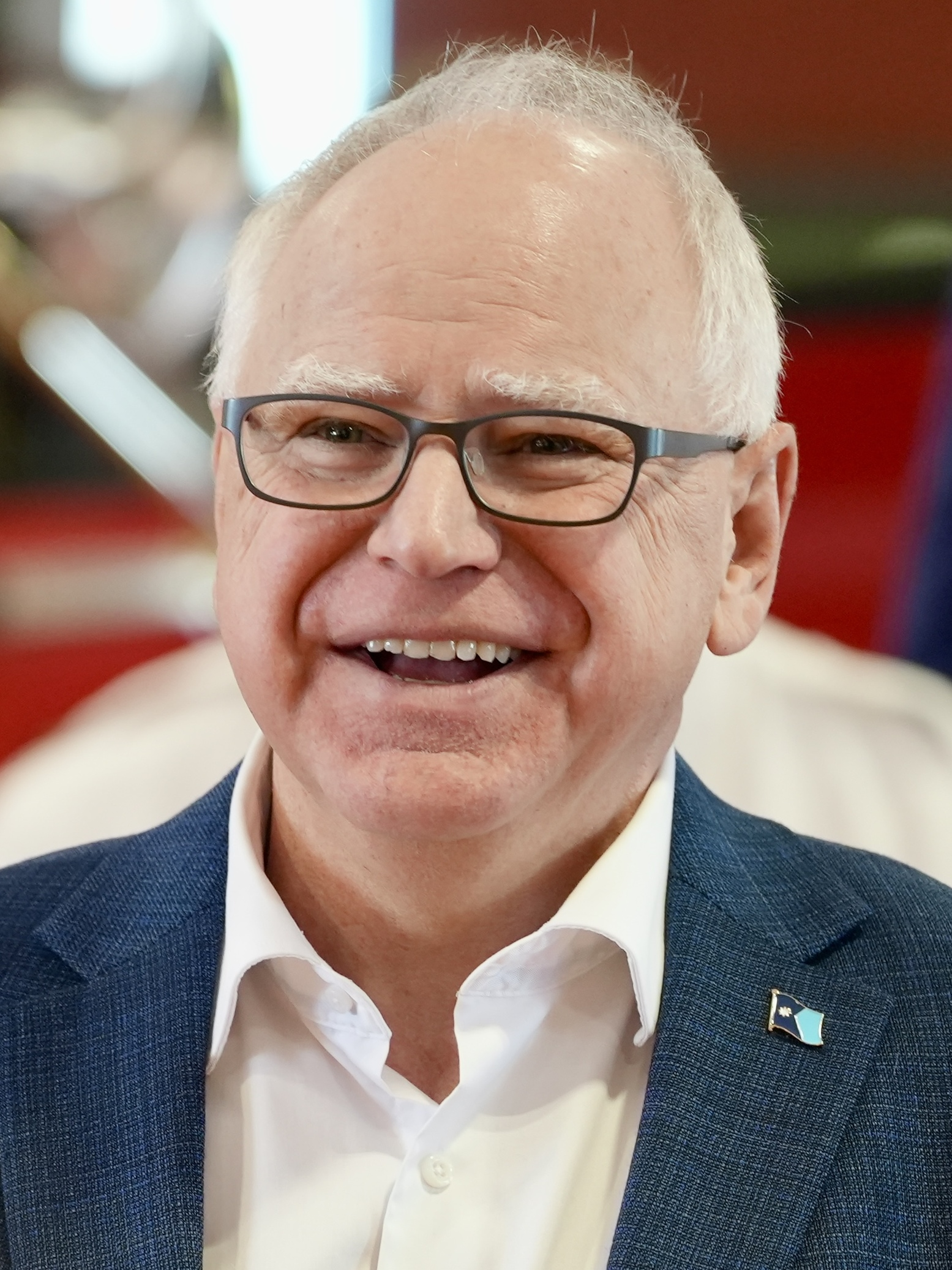
Tim Walz, the Governor of Minnesota since 2019

Minnesota governor Tim Walz faced criticism for a lack of state oversight. The editorial board of The Washington Post accused him of "refusing to take accountability". Political analyst Ember Reichgott Junge said that Walz's reelection (and potential future presidential) prospects had dimmed. Polling showed Walz's approval rating at its lowest since the beginning of his second term.

Members of the Minnesota Legislature's Republican caucus called on Walz to resign. Walz responded by saying that he had "strengthened oversight", citing his creation of an anti-fraud task force and investigations already launched by his office into several sites, including one featured in Shirley's video. His office and the state attorney also disputed federal claims that overall fraud losses were $9 billion. On December 31, 2025, Walz and a group of Republican state legislators were invited to testify before the U.S. House Oversight Committee. The Washington Examiner reported that Walz had received "nearly $10,000 in campaign contributions from supporters connected to Somali-operated day care centers". At the Oversight Committee hearing on January 7, 2026, Minnesota representative and chair of a Minnesota House fraud prevention committee Kristin Robbins alleged that Walz and his administration retaliated against whistleblowers and "have willfully turned a blind eye to crime in the face of countless whistleblower and auditor reports". Walz said the Trump administration was "politicizing the issue to defund programs that help Minnesotans".

On January 5, 2026, Walz announced he would withdraw his bid for reelection to a third term due to the fraud scandals. In a statement, he wrote, "Every minute I spend defending my own political interests would be a minute I can't spend defending the people of Minnesota against the criminals who prey on our generosity and the cynics who prey on our differences." The withdrawal was a surprise, as Walz faced no major primary challengers. In an exit interview later that year, Walz said he accepted responsibility for not stopping the fraud sooner, but contrasted the scandal with corruption during the second Trump presidency.

=== Federal government ===
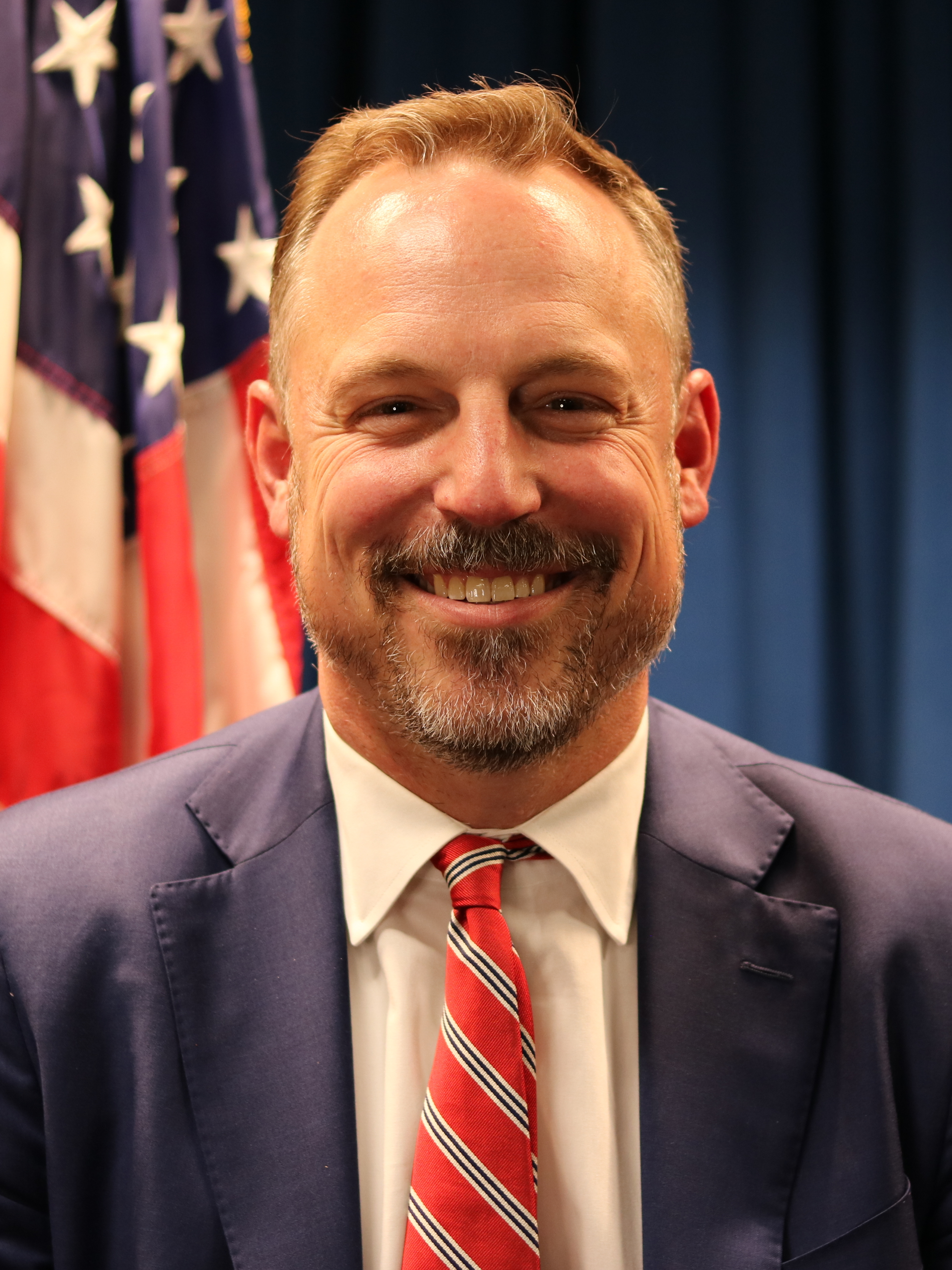
Joseph H. Thompson, Acting U.S. Attorney for Minnesota from June to October 2025; Thompson continued to be involved in fraud investigations following his term

In July 2025, Acting U.S. Attorney for Minnesota Joseph H. Thompson told KSTP that fraud in Minnesota public programs exceeded $1 billion in ongoing investigations. In November, The New York Times reported that federal prosecutors had found more than $1 billion of fraud in three separate schemes. Earlier exposés of fraud in COVID-19–era child-feeding programs and other safety-net benefits had largely been treated as one-off crimes. According to prosecutors, multiple front companies were registered to participate in state and federal programs and successfully billed for services they never delivered.

On November 19, conservative magazine City Journal alleged that some of the stolen funds had been sent abroad to fund the Somali terrorist group Al-Shabaab. The magazine cited three law enforcement officials, two of whom were anonymous. The single official named as a source in the article later claimed to have been misquoted and disputed the allegation. In December, Thompson alleged that among 14 different "high-risk" Medicaid programs run by the state, which provided $18 billion in funding since 2018, fraudulent payouts consisted of "half or more" of all funding. Thompson also said there was no evidence to support the direct transfer of state funds to Al-Shabaab, but that it could have indirectly acquired some of the money by taxing businesses in Somalia.

Vice President JD Vance shared Shirley's video, writing that he had "done far more useful journalism than any of the winners of the 2024 Pulitzer Prizes". Two days later, President Trump announced on Truth Social that he would revoke the Temporary Protected Status of Somalis residing in Minnesota, writing, "Somali gangs are terrorizing the people of that great State." This was condemned by leaders of the Minnesota Democratic–Farmer–Labor Party, including Representative Omar, who argued that targeting a single state by revoking such statuses was illegal. After the video's release, federal authorities increased their presence in Minnesota and federal funding for the childcare centers was frozen. Trump "signaled an interest in increasing his deportation efforts in the state by focusing on Somali immigrants" earlier in December. Immigration and Customs Enforcement increased enforcement activity in Minnesota under Operation Metro Surge.

FBI director Kash Patel said: "the FBI believes this is just the tip of a very large iceberg. We will continue to follow the money and protect children, and this investigation very much remains ongoing." The Department of Homeland Security announced its own investigation into alleged fraud, while Small Business Administration head Kelly Loeffler suspended agency funding to Minnesota to "investigate $430 million in suspected PPP fraud across the state".

In April 2026, federal agents raided 20 childcare centers in the Minneapolis–Saint Paul area, including the Future Leaders Early Learning center featured in Shirley's video. In May, federal prosecutors charged 15 people with approximately $90 million worth of fraud involving seven programs, including Child Care Assistance, Great Start Compensation Support, Housing Stabilization Services, Integrated Community Supports, and EIDBI. The owner of the Future Leaders Early Learning Center, Fahima Mahamud, was indicted on one count of wire fraud and one count of conspiracy to defraud the United States through Minnesota's Child Care Assistance Program.

== See also ==
- Mississippi welfare funds scandal
- Crime in Minnesota
