= Oak Park Heights Prison =

Maximum security prison in Minnesota, United States

Minnesota Correctional Facility – Oak Park Heights (MCF-OPH)
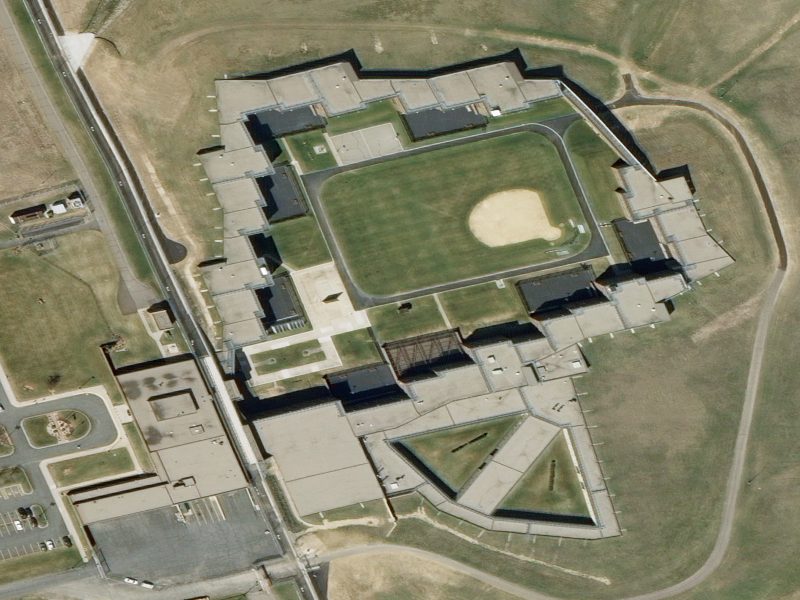
- Interactive map of Minnesota Correctional Facility – Oak Park Heights (MCF-OPH)
- Location: Oak Park Heights, Minnesota; 45.025°N 92.803°W
- Status: Operational
- Security class: Level 5 "Maximum"
- Capacity: 482
- Population: 407 (January 1st 2020)
- Opened: 1982
- Managed by: Minnesota Department of Corrections
- Warden: Jami Doeden

Minnesota Correctional Facility – Oak Park Heights (MCF-OPH) is Minnesota's only Level Five maximum security prison. The facility is located near the cities of Bayport and Stillwater. The facility is designed and employed with trained security officers to handle not only Minnesota's high-risk inmates but other states' as well. They also have the largest contract to house federal inmates with serious, violent histories. The prison has never had an escape, and only one homicide.

== History ==
The prison was designed by New York-based Gruzen & Partners with Minnesota-based Winsor/Faricy Architects, and was featured in the April 1980 issue of Progressive Architecture, then the largest magazine on architecture.

Frank Wood, the warden of Minnesota Correctional Facility – Stillwater prison, offered input for the plan. Wood was also the first warden of the prison from 1982 until 1996 when he retired. After serving as warden at the Stillwater Prison, he was named the first warden at the Oak Park Heights Prison in 1980. At the time, it was still being built. He oversaw staffing and planning for the site, which opened two years later.

In 2008, the Religious Resource Center at the Oak Park Heights Prison was named for Wood. Dennis Benson, Wood's Associate Warden, replaced him until he was appointed to the Warden of Stillwater Correctional facility in 1995. Eric Skon was then briefly promoted to Warden of Oak Park Heights. Wood's old Deputy Commissioner, James Bruton, became the warden from 1996 until 2001. Constructed in 1981 and opened in 1982 at a cost of $31.5 million, Oak Park Heights is home to approximately 481 offenders. According to the Minnesota Department of Corrections, the prison's nine complexes are "specialized uniquely to help facilitate a safe, secure, and humane environment for the offenders incarcerated as well as the staff who work at Oak Park Heights".

Constructed in 1981, MCF-OPH is the state's only Level-Five (Maximum) Custody Level prison for men, with an inmate population just under 350. The facility is home to some of the state's most violent offenders, as well as many out-of-state commits and a few federal inmates.

== Design ==
The prison is architecturally designed into the side of a hill to accommodate 481 inmates on a 160-acre (0.65 km^{2}) site, which is connected by two corridors on separate levels. One of the corridors is used only for the staff, while the other corridor is used primarily for offenders and staff traffic, while the other 60 acres (0.24 km^{2}) of this site are securely fenced in, with a large courtyard and baseball field in the center. The design places the cells on several underground levels. Inmate cells measure 7 by 10 feet (2.1 by 3.0 m). Each cell contains a bed, table, toilet, and sink. The bed is a cement slab topped by a thin mattress. The toilet and sink are made of steel so they can't be broken. Each cell also has one rectangular window that's tall and thin. It is too narrow to escape through if the inmate could break the reinforced glass, and tests have proven it would take approximately twelve thousand hacksaw blades to cut through the steel bars of the prison. Not only does the prison provide a courtyard with a baseball field, but also includes an administration building, a religious resource room, gymnasium, security control center, staffed training fitness area, warehouses, a loading dock, and indoor firing range.

The prison is composed of nine self-sustaining living units, referred to as complexes. The first six complexes each house 52 offenders and include shower facilities and a common area used for recreation and meals. Offenders in these complexes range from those serving segregation time, to those who are in education toward a GED, or working full-time in the facility as cooks, janitors, painters, or workers in the institution's industry units. MCF-OPH is home to the Minnesota Department of Corrections Commissary program. Inmates who qualify for these work programs are employed to process and package commissary orders from the other state correctional facilities.

Two of the three remaining complexes house the mental health unit (MHU) and the transitional care unit (TCU). The MHU and TCU both handle inmates from the entire Minnesota DOC who require the unique services of those units. The TCU serves inmates who need intensive nursing care, such as postsurgical care, and also serves as a hospice. The MHU works with individuals who are in a mental health crisis or individuals who have been civilly committed as mentally ill in addition to their criminal commitment.

The ninth unit, completed in 2001, is the state's administrative control unit (ACU), sometimes referred to as "Super-Seg". It houses the most violent offenders in an environment nearly completely free of physical contact with staff. Many of the offenders in the ACU have attempted to assault prison staff, or have engaged in a deadly assault on another inmate. Each cell is a self-contained living unit that includes sink, toilet, and shower. Each cell is accessed through two sets of doors, creating a sally port for each cell. Offenders are typically given access to an exercise room that is open to outside air for one hour each day.

The MCF-OPH facility, together with the H Unit of Oklahoma State Penitentiary in McAlester, Oklahoma, was featured in a one-hour TV documentary titled "Maximum Security Prisons", produced by Alan Hall (Beyond Productions) for the "On the Inside" series of the Discovery Channel. National Geographic has also produced an episode of America's Hardest Prisons on the Oak Park Heights Facility.

== Security ==
Security in each complex is controlled from a two-story security glassed-in "bubble" that allows officers to open and close doors throughout the unit on both cell blocks and in the programming space on the level above the cell blocks. While the electronic controls in the bubble were state of the art in 1982, they were due to be replaced in 2010 with modern computer controlled updates. Another system that was to be updated in 2010 is the vibration sensors on the exterior fence. The original fence used high tech vibration sensing technology from Israel that is no longer manufactured or supported.

Because each complex is sectioned off from the rest of the prison by a bubble controlled sally port, only small numbers of offenders can enter the hallway connecting the complexes at any one time. The hallway itself has large steel "sliders" that can quickly close off each section of hallway should a complex need to be isolated.

The "yard" is fully within the walls of the prison, and armed officers patrol the top of the walls whenever prisoners are out. Outside of the prison building is a field surrounded by a double set of fences topped with razor wire. No prisoner has ever escaped.

== Notable inmates ==
=== Current ===
Inmate Name	Register Number	Status	Details
Michael John Anderson	228994	Serving a life sentence.	Convicted of the 2007 murder of Katherine Ann Olson, which occurred after she was interested in a babysitting ad from Craigslist and went to Anderson's home to enquire about more details.
Byron David Smith	243835	Serving a life sentence without parole.	Convicted of the 2012 Murders of Haile Kifer and Nicholas Brady in which he lay in wait in his basement and then killed both of them.
Anthony John Sawina	254476	Serving a 39-year sentence. Scheduled for release in 2042.	Perpetrator of the 2016 Minneapolis shooting in which he injured two.

=== Former ===
- Donald Blom (1949–2023), convicted in the murder of Katie Poirier
- Christopher John Boyce (born 1953), former defense industry worker convicted of espionage; served some of his sentence at MC-OPH; released in 2002
- Derek Chauvin (born 1976), former Minneapolis police officer convicted in the murder of George Floyd
- Richard Lee McNair (born 1958), murderer known for escaping three prisons
- Mohamed Noor (born 1985), former Minneapolis police officer convicted of killing Justine Damond; served some of his sentence at MCF-OPH; released in 2022
- Mark Profit (1963–2001), murderer and suspected serial killer convicted of killing Renee Bell in 1996
- John Paul Scott (1927–1987), bank robber known for escaping Alcatraz Federal Penitentiary
- Paul Michael Stephani (1944–1998), serial killer; died of skin cancer
