= Law of Minnesota =

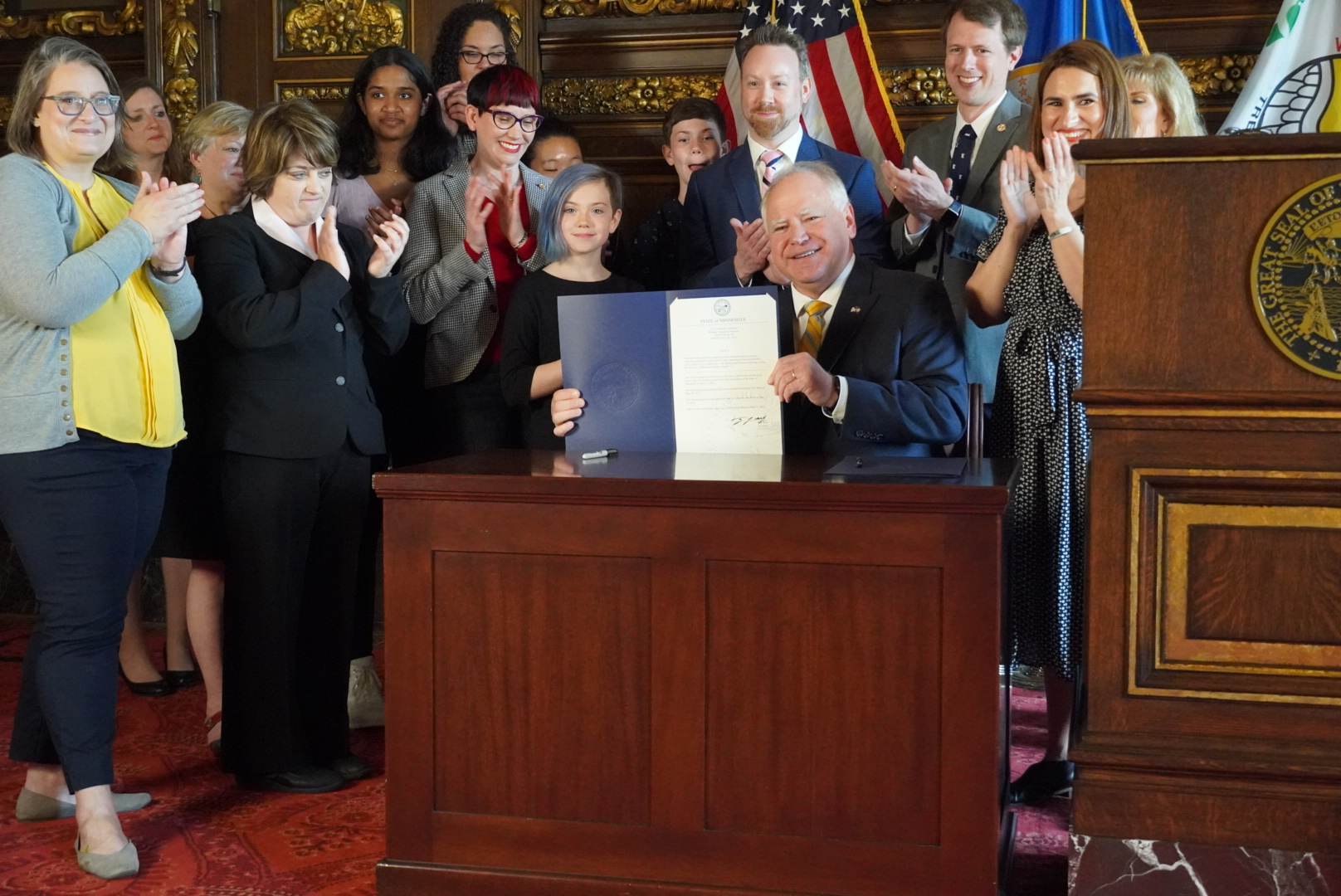
Governor Tim Walz signing a bill into law in 2022

The law of Minnesota refers to the legal framework that governs the U.S. state of Minnesota. It is a combination of the federal legal system, applicable throughout the United States, and state-specific laws and regulations. Minnesota has its own constitution, first ratified in 1857, which provides the fundamental structure and guidance for the state's legal processes.

== History ==
Minnesota became the 32nd state of the United States on May 11, 1858. The first constitution was ratified a year prior, in 1857. The legal system of Minnesota, like that of other states, has evolved over time to adapt to the changing social, economic, and political landscape, while also incorporating the federal legal framework set by the United States Constitution.

== Sources of law ==
=== Minnesota Constitution ===
The Minnesota Constitution serves as the foundational legal document for the state. The constitution establishes the structure of Minnesota's government and outlines the basic rights and freedoms of its citizens. Any law enacted in Minnesota must comply with both the United States Constitution and the Minnesota Constitution.

=== Statutory law ===
Statutory laws in Minnesota are enacted by the Minnesota Legislature, which consists of the House of Representatives and the Senate. These laws are codified in the Minnesota Statutes, a comprehensive collection of laws organized by subject matter. Statutory law addresses a broad array of topics, from criminal and civil law to administrative, corporate, and tax law.

=== Administrative regulations ===
Administrative agencies in Minnesota are empowered to create rules and regulations that provide more detailed guidelines on the implementation of statutory laws. These agencies, boards, and commissions focus on specialized areas such as healthcare, transportation, and environmental protection. Administrative law is compiled in the Minnesota Administrative Rules.

=== Case law ===
Minnesota's judicial system contributes to the development of law through the decisions made by its courts. Courts interpret statutes, regulations, and constitutional provisions, creating what is known as case law. This body of law is particularly important for clarifying ambiguities in statutes or for addressing issues not explicitly covered by statutory law.

=== Local ordinances ===
In addition to state-level laws and regulations, local governments in Minnesota, such as cities and counties, have the authority to enact ordinances. These typically pertain to issues like zoning, public safety, and local governance.

=== Federal law ===
Federal law, including the United States Constitution, federal statutes, and regulations, also applies within Minnesota. Where federal and state laws conflict, federal law takes precedence, according to the Supremacy Clause of the U.S. Constitution.

== See also ==
- Minnesota Supreme Court
- Governor of Minnesota
- LawMoose
- United States energy law
