= Joseph H. Thompson (attorney) =

American attorney

Joseph Thompson
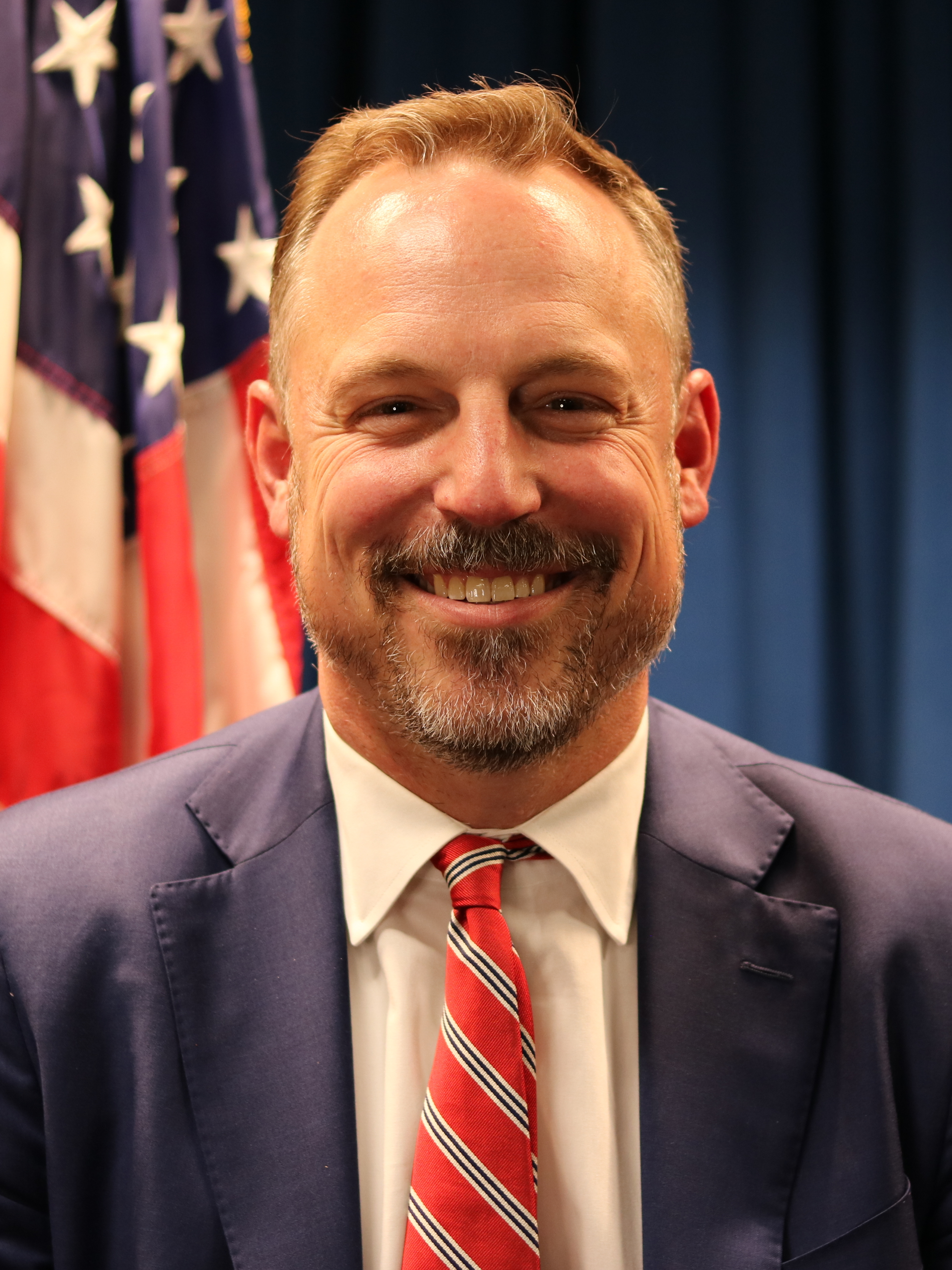
- Official portrait, 2025

United States Attorney for the District of Minnesota
- Acting
- In office June 2, 2025 – October 10, 2025
- President: Donald Trump
- Preceded by: Lisa Kirkpatrick
- Succeeded by: Daniel N. Rosen

Personal details
- Born: Minnesota, U.S.
- Education: Gustavus Adolphus College (BA); Stanford University (JD)

Joseph H. Thompson is an American lawyer who served as the acting United States attorney for the District of Minnesota from June 2 to October 10, 2025. From 2014 to 2025, he served as a federal prosecutor in that office.

Thompson was chief of the Fraud & Public Corruption section in the U.S. Attorney's Office, prosecuting fraud against state and federal government programs. He resigned from that position in January 2026 when he refused to comply with pressure from the Department of Justice under the second Donald Trump administration to launch an investigation into the widow of Renée Good, a Minneapolis resident shot and killed by an ICE agent.

== Education ==
Thompson attended Gustavus Adolphus College and received his Juris Doctor degree from Stanford Law School.

== Career ==
After graduating, Thompson served as a prosecutor in Chicago from 2009 to 2014, working on a wide variety of cases. In 2014, he joined the United States attorney's office in the District of Minnesota. Thompson served as chief of the Fraud & Public Corruption section in the U.S. Attorney's Office, prosecuting fraud against state and federal government programs. He was the lead prosecutor in the Feeding Our Future case and led prosecutions in other prominent fraud cases.

=== U.S. attorney for the District of Minnesota ===
On June 2, 2025, President Donald Trump appointed Thompson to be the United States attorney for the District of Minnesota. Thompson succeeded Lisa Kirkpatrick as acting U.S. Attorney, and Andrew M. Luger as U.S. Attorney.

Thompson was serving as U.S. attorney for the District of Minnesota during the 2025 shootings of Minnesota legislators. The U.S. Attorney's Office investigated the shootings in partnership with the Hennepin County Attorney's Office, the FBI, the Minnesota Bureau of Criminal Apprehension, and other agencies. On June 16, 2025, Thompson led a press conference announcing the apprehension of Vance Luther Boelter in the case. On July 15, 2025, Thompson announced six federal grand jury indictments against Boelter.

On January 13, 2026, Thompson and five other prosecutors resigned their positions in the District of Minnesota, reportedly due to disagreement with the Trump administration's push to investigate the widow of Renée Good, a Minneapolis resident shot and killed by an ICE agent, along with the department's unwillingness to investigate the agent who killed her.
