= Mark Profit =

American murderer and suspected serial killer

- Born: Mark Antonio Profit; 1963; Minneapolis, Minnesota, U.S.
- Died: September 27, 2001 (aged 38); Oak Park Heights Prison, Minnesota, U.S.
- Other name: "The Theodore Wirth Park Killer"
- Convictions: Murder; Assault
- Penalty: Life imprisonment (2 sentences)

Details
- Victims: 1–4
- Span of crimes: May 23 – July 20, 1996
- Country: United States
- State: Minnesota
- Date apprehended: October 4, 1996

Mark Antonio Profit (1963 – September 27, 2001) was an American murderer and rapist who was convicted of the 1997 murder of prostitute Renee Bell in Minneapolis, Minnesota. Bell was one of four victims attributed to a serial killer called The Theodore Wirth Park Killer, named for the fact that all were killed in Minneapolis' Theodore Wirth Park.

Although never charged in any of the murders besides Bell's, Profit remained the prime suspect and was widely considered responsible for all four killings. He died behind bars in 2001, still protesting his innocence.

== Early life and crimes ==
Mark Profit was born in 1963 in an impoverished area of Minneapolis, Minnesota. His father left the family in the late 1960s, leaving Profit's mother to raise him and his sister by herself. The young boy showed no interest in studying, and by the mid-1970s, he dropped out of school and turned to a life of crime.

By 1978, Profit had been arrested about 30 times on various felony charges, and often committed burglaries. The following year, the then-16-year-old was arrested for robbing a woman with a sawed-off shotgun whom he had tied up and gagged, for which he would later be convicted and sentenced to 2 years imprisonment. Profit was released in 1981, and within six weeks of his release, he assaulted three girls at knifepoint and attempted to bind his victims on two occasions.

=== 1981 assaults ===
On September 2, Profit threatened a 15-year-old girl in northeast Minneapolis with a knife and forced her to follow him to his apartment, where he undressed her, tied her up, and raped her. On September 10, Profit attacked a woman at a day care center in northern Minneapolis - during the attack, he tore off her clothes, tied her up, and raped her. The final attack occurred on the following day, where he committed a similar attack on a 16-year-old girl.

Profit was convicted for these crimes in 1982 and, as a repeat violent felon, was sentenced to 21 years imprisonment. However, he was paroled in January 1996 after serving 14 years. Initially, he was ordered to reside at a social rehabilitation facility for former prisoners until May 6, when he was allowed to return to live at his mother's house.

== Serial murders ==
The series of murders began on May 23, 1996, when the body of 30-year-old Renee Bell was found in Bassett Creek at Theodore Wirth Park. She was last seen alive on May 21, and was strangled with a tan elastic band, one end of which was in her mouth and used as a gag. Bell was a prostitute who looked for customers on Broadway Avenue in Minneapolis, and an autopsy determined that she had used crack cocaine hours before her death. The forensic examiner found no signs of sexual assault or biological traces from the perpetrator, but did not rule out the possibility that Bell may have been raped, as her corpse had been in the waters of the creek for a long time.

On June 3, the charred remains of a woman were discovered on the grounds of Theodore Wirth Park, with an autopsy later determining that the decedent was 43-year-old Deborah LaVoie. An exact date and cause of death could not be established, but it was concluded that LaVoie was last seen alive on May 23.

On June 19, the body of 36-year-old Avis Warfield, a homeless woman who engaged in prostitution, was found near Profit's home. The woman had been stabbed in the heart, after which her killer had made an unsuccessful attempt to set her on fire to destroy evidence. While examining the crime scene, officers found a cigarette butt which they surmized likely belonged to the perpetrator. Warfield's acquaintances later gave conflicting testimony regarding when they had last seen her alive, as some claimed that it was on the day prior to her body being found, while others said that they had seen her alive and well long after her body was found. Due to this, the exact date of her disappearance and death could not be established.

On July 20, the charred remains of another woman were discovered in Theodore Wirth Park, later identified as 21-year-old transsexual Keooudorn Photisane, who was last seen alive in the early hours of that day. An autopsy concluded that she had been stabbed in the neck, after which her killer doused her in gasoline and set the body on fire. Officers located three children as potential witnesses, with them stating that they saw a suspicious-looking, middle-aged black male setting a fire in the park, exactly where the victim's body would later be found. From their testimony, an identikit was developed of the suspect.

On August 31, a woman named Phynice Johnson was attacked in Theodore Wirth Park. Like all previous victims, she was a drug addict who prostituted herself on Broadway Avenue. She later claimed that a man, later identified as Mark Profit, stopped next to her at around 11 PM and offered to have sex with her. Johnson said that they smoked crack cocaine for 20 minutes, after which Profit drove her to Theodore Wirth Park, where he sexually assaulted her. During the struggle, he ripped off her T-shirt, but Johnson managed to get out of the car - Profit followed after her, demanding that she return the drugs and threatening to kill her. He eventually caught up with her and pulled down her pants, but at that time, a married couple - Joan Demeules and George Barrett - were driving through the park when they noticed the attack. The pair got out of the car and went to help her, with Demeules saying that she hit the attacker with an ice scraper while Barrett hit him with a bag full of tomatoes. Profit eventually let go of Johnson, fled back to his car, and sped away. Demeules and Barrett were later awarded a Citizen Medal of Valor for their actions.

== Arrest ==
Since almost all of the victims had been burned post-mortem, Minneapolis police assumed that they had all been killed by the same perpetrator and that they had a serial killer on the loose. A task force was formed to investigate the murders, consisting of investigators from Minneapolis, Golden Valley and the Hennepin County Sheriff's Department. While investigating the Bell crime scene, investigators found a wallet belonging to a man named Mark Profit, who soon became the prime suspect and was put under surveillance.

In the middle of summer, police were contacted by a man named Paul Kelly Jr., who was the boyfriend of Profit's sister. He said that Profit had asked to borrow a gas can from him on July 20, after which he disappeared for an hour and a half to two hours. Upon returning home, Kelly said that Profit immediately began washing his clothes and temporarily wore some of Kelly's own clothing, as well as requesting that he help him clean the interior of his car. Ultimately, Kelly claimed that Profit had confessed to him in private, saying that he had killed all the girls in Theodore Wirth Park.

Based on the circumstantial evidence, Profit was arrested on October 4, 1996. Following his arrest, the police searched the house where he lived in and the interior of his mother's car, a Pontiac Grand Am. After vacuuming the interior upholstery and analyzing some debris, it was revealed that the purple-colored fiber from the car's upholstery matched that of the elastic bandniquet used to strangle Renee Bell. Not long after, Profit was charged with the murder of Bell and the rape of Phynice Johnson, who by then had positively identified him as her assailant. He was initially charged with second-degree murder, which was later upgraded to first-degree murder.

== Trial ==
The trial began on April 14, 1997. During the trial, Profit maintained that he was innocent, with him and one of his attorneys, Charles Amdahl, claiming that Kelly was the actual killer, and that he had planted the wallet found near Bell's body and the cigarettes that Profit smoked near Warfield's body. The attorneys also claimed that the police sketch did not resemble their client at all, and that it more closely matched Kelly. Profit himself claimed that the two spent a lot of time in his car and that Kelly often went to his house on numerous occasions, during which he socialized with his mother and had access to his belongings, including documents and ashtrays. The attorneys then requested the court to examine potential motives for Kelly to wanted Profit to be prosecuted instead, arguing that the witness testimony was unreliable.

As evidence, they cited claims from Kelly's acquaintances who characterized him as a pathological liar and manipulator, and well as supposedly sending a letter to the KARE-TV station in which he confessed to murdering Keooudorn Photisane. A graphological examination revealed that the handwriting was indeed that of Kelly, who claimed that he done it under threat by Profit.

Profit was unable to provide an alibi for the time of Renee Bell's murder, but his attorneys provided the court with documents showing that a week before the murder, he had been in a car accident and sustained injuries that left him unable to leave the house. In addition, the attorneys pointed out that their client regularly met with his parole officer and had restrictions on his liberty, making it supposedly impossible for him to engage in criminal behavior without alarming law enforcement. To counter this, the prosecution provided the court with witness testimonies from two of Profit's acquaintances, in which they claimed that he had discussed at various times a variety of methods to commit the perfect murder.

One of these acquaintances said that he was serving a term in the same jail as Profit, who was alleged to closely follow the O. J. Simpson trial in 1995 and came to the conclusion that all sperm traces should be destroyed to make DNA analysis impossible. The other acquaintance claimed that Profit had confessed to him that he chose girls and women of low social status intentionally, as he believed that law enforcement were negligent in investigating violent acts committed against these types of people. Profit himself initially claimed that he stayed at home with his wife during the murders, but was later forced to admit under the pressure of evidence that he despite being married, he had casual sex with other women and occasionally used the services of prostitutes.

== Verdict and incarceration ==
On May 7, 1997, Profit was found guilty via jury verdict on all counts against him. As a result, on June 2, he was sentenced to two life terms with a chance of parole after serving 60 years. Following his conviction, he was transferred to the Oak Park Heights Prison to serve out his sentence. During his imprisonment there, he started making photo albums, studied law and frequently read the Bible, claiming that his favorite verse was John 8:32.

In June 1999, Profit and attorney Robert Miller requested that he be brought to trial for the murder of Avis Warfield, arguing that although DNA evidence extracted from the cigarette butt showed that his genotypic profile matched Profit, there was evidence that would have him acquitted and cast further doubt about his conviction in the Bell murder. Their argument was that Profit was in jail for a parole violation at the time her body had been discovered, but as the exact date of death was never established due to the severe decomposition of her corpse, the Hennepin County Prosecutor's Office never brought Profit to trial for this murder.

== Death ==
On September 27, 2001, Mark Profit was found inside his cell at the Oak Park Heights Prison. The cause of death was determined to be a drug overdose, but the exact manner of how it happened was never concretely established. His wife, Sherri, claimed that he had been depressed for the last few months of his life and often talked about killing himself, suggesting that Profit most likely died by suicide.

A week before his death, he had been found guilty of assaulting a prison guard and another inmate, and likely faced an additional 20 years imprisonment to be served concurrently with his two life sentences.
