= Killing of Amber Czech =

Homicide in Cokato, Minnesota, United States

- Location: Cokato, Wright County, Minnesota, U.S.
- Date: November 11, 2025
- Attack type: Homicide
- Weapon: Sledgehammer
- Accused: 1
- Charges: Second-degree intentional murder

On November 11, 2025, 20-year-old welder Amber Mary Czech was fatally bludgeoned with a sledgehammer at her workplace, Advanced Process Technologies, in Cokato, Minnesota. Prosecutors in Wright County charged her co-worker, 40-year-old David Bruce Delong of Watkins, Minnesota, with second-degree intentional murder, alleging that he attacked her at her welding station inside the food-processing equipment plant. The killing drew regional and national attention as an instance of workplace violence and prompted widespread discussion of safety and harassment facing women in the skilled trades.

== Background ==
Amber Mary Czech was born on July 11, 2005, in Hutchinson, Minnesota, to Peter and Angela Czech. She attended St. Anastasia Catholic School in Hutchinson through sixth grade and graduated from Hutchinson High School with the class of 2023. During high school, she played basketball for the Hutchinson Tigers.

Czech completed a 10-month welding technology program at Alexandria Technical & Community College, graduating with honors in May 2024. In July 2024, she began working as a welder at Advanced Process Technologies in Cokato, and was known as a hardworking tradeswoman who took pride in her craft. She also taught welding at her former high school on days off from the plant.

== Homicide ==
On November 11, 2025, around 6 a.m., the Wright County Sheriff's Office responded to Advanced Process Technologies in Cokato after an adult woman was found at her workstation with significant head trauma. First responders attempted life-saving measures, but she was pronounced dead at the scene and was later identified as 20-year-old Amber Mary Czech of Hutchinson.

Advanced Process Technologies, located in an industrial area of Cokato, Minnesota, manufactures equipment for food and dairy processing. A criminal complaint and subsequent reporting state that surveillance footage from inside the plant showed co-workers walking past each other on the shop floor shortly before the attack, after which a man left his station, picked up a sledgehammer and walked back toward Czech's workstation, where she was struck repeatedly. The medical examiner later determined that Czech died from blunt force trauma to the head.

== Investigation ==
Deputies took a male co-worker, identified as David Bruce Delong of Watkins, Minnesota, into custody at the plant without incident. The criminal complaint states that the assault was captured on plant surveillance cameras and describes a series of forceful swings with a sledgehammer at Czech's head.

According to the complaint, Delong told a co-worker after the assault that he had struck Czech with the co-worker's hammer and that she was "gone," and later gave a custodial statement in which he admitted intending to kill her. Prosecutors and media reports summarizing the complaint state that Delong said he did not like Czech, claimed she had once given him a "bad look," and said he had been thinking about killing her for some time.

Advanced Process Technologies paused production for the remainder of the week following the killing and stated that it was cooperating with investigators and providing support to employees.

== Legal proceedings ==
On November 13, 2025, the Wright County Attorney's Office charged David Bruce Delong in Wright County District Court with one count of second-degree intentional murder in connection with Czech's death. Prosecutors stated that they would evaluate the case for a possible first-degree premeditated murder charge, which under Minnesota law would require convening a grand jury.

Delong was booked into the Wright County Jail and held on $2 million bail. Following an appearance in court on November 24, 2025, a judge ordered that Delong must undergo a test of mental competency, scheduled for January 15, 2026. As of late November 2025, he had not entered a plea and no trial date had been set.

On February 23, 2026 Wright County District Judge Kari Willis issued the incompetency ruling, suspending further criminal proceedings against Delong until he is restored to competency. The ruling came after a competency evaluation by a forensic phsycologist determined Delong lacks the ability to understand the proceedings against him due to ongoing mental illness. 14

== Media coverage and public response ==
News of Czech's killing and the details described in the criminal complaint received widespread coverage in Minnesota and nationally, including reporting by local outlets in Hutchinson and Wright County, statewide television stations, national cable networks and magazines. Coverage framed the case within broader debates about workplace violence, gender-based harassment and safety for women in traditionally male trades.

Czech's visitation and funeral were held at St. Anastasia Catholic Church in Hutchinson, where lines of mourners from the city and surrounding communities attended services in late November 2025. A Culver's restaurant in Hutchinson dedicated a night of sales to the "Amber Czech Memorial Fund," drawing long lines and raising about $1,800 in three hours.

Czech's death resonated among women in construction and manufacturing trades across the United States. The National Association of Women in Construction scheduled an emergency virtual meeting after the killing, where hundreds of members shared experiences of gender-based harassment and concerns about safety. Tradeswomen and allies organized symbolic actions such as wearing blue to work, posting messages under the tag of a "blue collar sisterhood," and donating to the family's fundraising efforts. Advocacy groups and labor writers used the case to call for stronger workplace violence prevention measures, clearer reporting mechanisms for harassment and threats, and more robust safety standards for workers in manufacturing and construction.
