= Murder of Brian Glick =

1993 murder in Bloomington, Minnesota

The murder of Brian Glick by Dennis Tate and Michael Olson who were robbing a sandwich store in Bloomington, Minnesota occurred on October 25, 1993. The murder was a shock to the Twin Cities community, and his death and the subsequent court proceedings of his murderers received widespread attention in the Twin Cities press. Glick was 21 years old.

== Brian Glick's life ==
Glick was born on April 25, 1972 in Duluth, Minnesota. He grew up in Minneapolis. His parents were divorced in 1978. His family moved to Bloomington and in 1990 Glick graduated from Bloomington Kennedy High School. In 1992 he began working at a Subway store on Old Shakopee Road East, a block away from where he lived with his mother, stepfather and teenage sister, Tammy. At the time of his death Glick had been working to save enough money to marry his fiancée Katie Long. Glick was interested in aviation, but his plans to become an aircraft mechanic were thwarted when it was discovered that he was color-blind. Instead, Glick returned to school and completed the necessary course work to become a paramedic.

In the year before his death, it was discovered that Glick had a large benign brain tumor, and in May 1992 he underwent surgery to have it removed. At the time of his death Glick was still recovering, but his prognosis was positive. However, the operation that saved his life contributed to his death. Shortly after surgery Glick returned to work at Subway. On the last day his boss saw him he commented "You're really bouncing around here tonight. You really look good." Glick responded that he was feeling the best he had since the surgery and he was going to make it.

== The killing ==
On the night of Monday October 25, 1993, Glick was working alone at the Subway shop. He spoke with his fiancée by telephone around 11 p.m., and fifteen minutes later, at around 11:15 p.m., went out back to empty the trash. Glick was unaware that Dennis Tate (b. 04/27/1977), 16, and Michael William Olson (b. 03/05/1974), 19, were waiting for him behind the store. Olson was a former employee at the store, but had been fired, and knew both Glick and the layout of the store. As Glick headed back into the shop after emptying the trash, Tate and Olson jumped him and brutally choked and beat him until he was unrecognizable. The two then entered the store, vandalized surveillance cameras, and stole a cashbox containing $152. Glick's fiancée went to the store about 11:30 p.m. to pick him up. When she found the store empty she called police, who arrived shortly before midnight. Glick was found behind the store and immediately taken by ambulance to Hennepin County Medical Center. Glick died at 4:50 a.m. Tuesday, October 26, 1993, with his parents at his bedside. Doctors noted that a piece of skull that was healing from the recent brain tumor operation had been pushed up and back into his brain, contributing to Glick's death.

== Arrests and interview ==
Michael Olson was arrested on October 27 after police found a bloody shirt at his home. Dennis Tate was apprehended the following day. The two confessed to killing Glick, and told the police that they had intended to double the money stolen with the purchase and sale of drugs - a plan that went awry when they were ripped off by a drug dealer.

== Court proceedings ==
Olson and Tate pleaded guilty in a Hennepin County District Court. Olson's proceedings were overseen by Judge Kevin Burke. Olson was sentenced in March 1994 to 27 years and two months in prison for second-degree murder. Glick's father, Stephen; mother; and fiancée provided victim statements at the proceedings. At Olson's sentencing Glick's father said:

His [Olson's] prison is now measured by walls. Mine is measured in sadness, loneliness and anger. For the rest of my life, my relationship with my son has been dictated by him. I hate him for making this prison for me. I hate him for taking it upon himself to decide how I will relate to my son.

Tate's proceedings took over a year because his defense argued he was not yet sixteen years old therefore he could not be tried as an adult. His birth certificate showed he was born over sixteen years prior, and the motion was denied by the judge. Tate's team appealed the order to the Minnesota Supreme Court, which denied Tate's petition. Tate was ordered to stand trial as an adult, but he pleaded guilty to second-degree murder. In January 1995, Tate was sentenced to 25½ years in prison by Judge John M. Stanoch. At Tate's sentencing, Minneapolis Imam Matthew Ramadan spoke on Tate's behalf and stated Tate's fate was "the same situation of so many other African-American males. I expect the courts to judge him more harshly because he killed a white man. Justice is not blind." Glick's mother was quoted in the Star Tribune saying, "I'm the one who lost a son. Why did he [Ramadan] try to turn it into a racial thing?"

== Imprisonment and release ==
While in prison, Tate changed his name to Mujahid Ghazi Muhammad. He was released from prison under supervised custody in a work release program in Ramsey County in 2010.

In 2011, Olson was released from prison under supervised custody in a work release program in Hennepin County.
