= LawMoose =

LawMoose, launched in September 2000, is believed to have been the first U.S. regional legal search engine operating its own independent web crawler.

Initially LawMoose provided a searchable index drawn from Minnesota law and government sites. Later, it added a similar capability for Wisconsin law sites and select general legal reference starting point sites.

LawMoose has since evolved into a hybrid bi-level public and subscription legal knowledge environment, featuring a thesaurus-based topical map of legal and governmental web resources (which spans the U.S. and globe and adds non-legal resources in a subscriber edition), a list of the largest one hundred Minnesota law firms, ranked by number of Minnesota lawyers, the Minnesota Legal Periodical Index, listing and topically categorizing more than 39,000 thousand articles published in Minnesota legal publications from 1984 to the present (in the public edition), and a densely interconnected, constantly evolving legal words, phrases, concepts and resources knowledge graph (in a subscriber edition).

LawMoose's legal words, phrases, concepts and resources knowledge graph consists of more than 337,000 legal, governmental, business, insurance, and popular terms, interconnected through more than 1,425,000 semantic relationships. Interconnections are based on a relationships vocabulary of 300 relationship types. This multi-dimensional intellectual network functions as a navigable intellectual model of law and law practice.

This semantic, intellectual network-based approach to organizing legal knowledge, legal diagnostic and problem solving concepts, law practice processes, and conceptually locating legal and law practice resources is a significant departure from traditional hierarchical, case law-specific legal taxonomies, such as the taxonomy utilized by the West American Digest System and from collections of searchable primary law.

The Minnesota Legal Periodical Index has been continuously maintained by the Minnesota State Law Library since 1984. Since 2002, it has appeared on LawMoose through a collaboration with LawMoose publisher, Pritchard Law Webs, Minneapolis, Minnesota.

== See also ==
- FindLaw
