= Murder of Alayna Ertl =

2016 child murder in Minnesota, U.S

Alayna Ertl
- Photograph of Alayna Ertl provided by local authorities
- Born: Alayna Jeanne Ertl; October 31, 2010
- Disappeared: August 20, 2016
- Died: August 20, 2016 (aged 5); Cass County, Minnesota, U.S.
- Cause of death: Strangulation and blunt-force trauma
- Resting place: Saint Anthony Catholic Church Cemetery
- Parents: Matt Ertl (father); Kayla Ertl (mother)

Alayna Jeanne Ertl was a 5-year-old girl from Watkins, Minnesota who was murdered after being kidnapped from her home on August 20, 2016. She was last seen alive at 2 a.m. Central Daylight Time and discovered missing 6 hours later. Following an investigation by local authorities and the Minnesota Bureau of Criminal Apprehension (BCA) she was found deceased at Wilderness Park in Cass County.

The perpetrator was Zachary Todd Anderson. He pled guilty to first-degree murder while committing criminal sexual conduct and was sentenced to life in prison without possibility of parole.

== Background ==
=== Zachary Todd Anderson ===
Anderson was born on November 26, 1990. In May 2006, Anderson (then aged 15) lived in a townhouse with his mother in Monticello, Minnesota. According to court documents released by Wright County in 2016, in the summer of 2006, one of Anderson's neighbors reported to authorities that he was leaving love notes on her car. They were stated to include compliments on the woman's appearance and a phone number to call if she was interested in dating him. In December, court documents describe Anderson going to the neighbor's home and demanding the woman have sex with him, and after being repeatedly denied, he fled once the woman's boyfriend went to the door. In June 2007, Anderson broke into the woman's home by removing a window screen and then stole the woman's cell phone. As a result, he was charged with first-degree burglary and theft, and later pled guilty to third-degree burglary with a sentence of mandatory community service.

According to a cousin of Matt Ertl — Alayna's father — Anderson had been friends with the Ertl family for years before the murder. She described Anderson as playing on Matt's softball team every Friday and spending the night at the Ertl residence regularly. Anderson and Matt also worked together at the company Vannguard Utility Partners. Their job was to find and mark underground utility lines.

== Disappearance and investigation ==
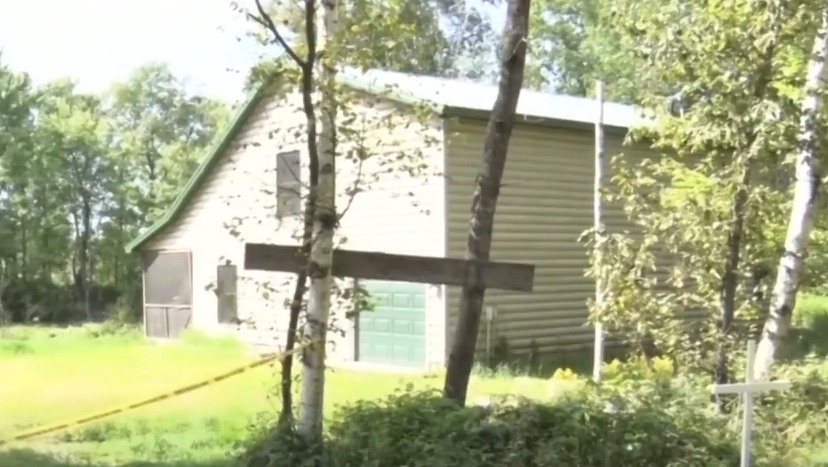
The Anderson family cabin, located near the body of Alayna Ertl.

On August 19, 2016, Anderson played softball with Matt in the evening. The two later returned to the Ertl residence where they spoke until 4 a.m. on August 20, after which Matt went to bed. At 2 a.m., Alayna was put to bed by her mother, Kayla Ertl. At 8 a.m., both parents discovered that Alayna, Anderson, and Matt's 2002 GMC Sierra were missing. The parents filed a missing persons report with the Meeker County Sheriff's office two hours later.

Following the report, the sheriff's office canvassed the Watkins area without success. The BCA then joined the investigation, canvassed a larger area, and reviewed security camera footage from local businesses, none of which bore progress. An amber alert was issued for Alayna at 1:30 p.m. While searching, authorities traced the Sierra by tracking a cell phone that Matt left inside it. It was determined that Anderson was in Todd County from 6:30 a.m. until 9 a.m., at which point the cell phone was turned off. Anderson was also spotted at a convenience store in Browerville at 8:30 a.m., seemingly alone.

According to court documents, at roughly 2 p.m. the Cass County Sheriff's office received a tip from a caller claiming to be Anderson's father. They reported that Anderson asked to use their family's cabin in Motley, and then permitted authorities to search the area. Two pairs of officers responded. One pair went to the cabin and found the Sierra in a nearby ravine, court documents alleging that Anderson parked it there to conceal it. When they searched the cabin, they found a 20-gauge shotgun, appropriate ammunition, and a suicide note. The other pair alongside a K-9 followed footsteps outside the cabin that led into the woods. At 4:30 p.m. Anderson was found standing knee-deep in a swamp with a cut on his left wrist. He was unarmed and did not resist arrest. When asked where Alayna was, he indicated he did not know and that he did not want to talk. When pressured further, he admitted that Alayna was in the swamp and led officers to her body at 6:02 p.m.

Alayna's body was found unclothed and submerged in water roughly 80 miles (130 km) away from Watkins. She was pronounced dead on scene, and Anderson was charged and booked into Crow Wing County jail. Alayna's autopsy revealed her cause of death was strangulation and blunt force trauma with evidence of sexual assault.

== Criminal proceedings ==
On October 25, 2017, Anderson was indicted by a grand jury on 19 charges including first and second-degree murder, first and second-degree criminal sexual conduct, interference with a dead body, kidnapping, and motor vehicle theft. Anderson pled not guilty. Anderson's bail was set at $1 million with conditions and $2 million without conditions.

In a motion to dismiss the indictment, Anderson's attorney argued that there was insufficient probable cause for the arrest since the information was obtained after Anderson invoked his fifth amendment right to remain silent. Judge Jana Austad ruled in May that investigators improperly questioned Anderson. As a result, Anderson's first statement to police, the fact he knew Alayna was in the swamp, and the fact he led officers to her body was deemed inadmissible.

Another motion was filed to make the details of Alayna's discovery, including clothing and personal effects in her vicinity, inadmissible for the same reason. The prosecution argued that the information would have been obtained independent of Anderson's statement due to the resources deployed in the area, such as the K-9 and a helicopter with infrared radar. Judge Austad did not grant that motion. According to the prosecutor assigned to the case, Benjamin Lindstrom, the state aimed for the maximum punishment of life imprisonment without release, stating "If people are going to hurt our kids, we will do everything we can by law to make it right. This doesn’t make it right but it’s the most we can do under the law."

On March 2, 2018, Anderson pled guilty to one count of first-degree murder while committing criminal sexual conduct with the remaining counts dismissed. Anderson was then sentenced to life in prison without possibility of parole, the minimum sentence for the crime in Minnesota. As part of the guilty plea, Anderson was asked questions in court about the crime, where he admitted to kidnapping Alayna, sexually assaulting her, and then "leaving her for dead in Cass County". Victim impact statements from Alayna's family were read the same day. Lindstrom commented that he was surprised Anderson took the plea since there was no incentive to do so, claiming that if the case went to jury trial the result would have been the same.

== Aftermath ==
A GoFundMe page was launched on August 21, 2016, to raise money for Alayna's family to help with memorial expenses. The goal was set at $10,000. Roughly $14,000 was raised in eight hours, and it would exceed $40,000 two days later.

On August 23, 2016, community members placed angel figurines and flowers in front of the Ertl residence. On the same day, a candle-lit vigil was held with hundreds of attendees at the St. Anthony Church of Watkins. Alayna was buried at St. Anthony on August 26 after a two-day visitation period at the Ertl Funeral Home.

On September 10, 2023, as part of a two-year collaboration between various businesses, a life-size statue of Alayna Ertl was erected in McCarthy Park in Watkins.

=== Sharing Alayna Ertl's Love charity ===
On the Halloween of the same year of Alayna's disappearance, Kayla Ertl hosted a public event that doubled as a celebration of Alayna's birthday. This event would later be repeated annually and inspire the creation of the "Sharing Alayna Ertl's Love" charity. The charity collects donations during the annual Halloween party, typically in the form of toys or money, and then distributes them throughout the year to sick children and families in need. The charity has reportedly donated to the St. Cloud Hospital and a Litchfield family who had experienced a loss near the time of the donation. The Halloween party is funded through a separate memorial all-terrain vehicle run event that is based out of a tavern in Forest City.
