= Feeding Our Future =

Defunct Minnesota nonprofit

- Established: 2016
- Founder: Aimee Bock
- Dissolved: 2022
- Type: Nonprofit 501(c)(3) until 2020
- Purpose: Hunger relief

Feeding Our Future was a Minnesota nonprofit founded in 2016. During the COVID-19 pandemic, it claimed to distribute many thousands of meals to schoolchildren, but instead stole hundreds of millions of dollars while providing few or no meals at most of its locations. Merrick Garland, attorney general during the Biden administration, called it the country’s largest pandemic relief fraud scheme.

Although the state agency responsible for monitoring the school meal program repeatedly tried to cut off funds, the organization was not shut down until FBI raids and federal indictments in 2022. As of early 2026, out of 80 suspects indicted in the fraud, 62 had pled guilty. Another seven individuals were found guilty at trial, including the leader of the scheme, Aimee Bock, while others awaited trial. Bock was sentenced to more than 41 years imprisonment. Including Bock, 23 of those convicted have been sentenced.

As most of the individuals charged or convicted in the case were Somali Americans (excluding Bock, a White American), the Somali community in Minnesota was subsequently targeted by the administration of Donald Trump. Citing the Feeding Our Future case, Trump's administration launched an immigration operation in Minnesota in late 2025 called Operation Metro Surge.

== History ==
The organization was founded by Aimee Bock in 2016, and repeatedly applied for grants from the state of Minnesota, but was rejected due to allegations of mismanagement and abuses. In July 2019, months before the COVID-19 pandemic, Minnesota Department of Education (MDE) officials identified early signs of fraud, including meal claims they considered implausible. According to former state employees, Bock pressured workers who raised questions within weeks of the organization's first submissions, and officials began documenting her "concerning behavior". Before the pandemic, Feeding Our Future billed the state for approximately $3.4 million. The organization's tax status as a nonprofit was revoked by the IRS in February 2020.

After the onset of the coronavirus pandemic and a large increase in the amount of federal aid available, Feeding Our Future applied to receive funding to provide meals to school children, as schools were closed. Some experienced MDE employees, suspicious of potential fraud, sought to conduct investigation of meal sites. The employees felt that their efforts were stymied by MDE leadership, which they described as reluctant to take action for fear of litigation. MDE began giving the organization substantial grants after Feeding Our Future threatened legal action against the state. Katherine Theisen, a senior employee of Minnesota's Office of the Legislative Auditor, later described MDE's response as "a systemic failure." The MDE eventually raised concerns of fraud with the United States Department of Agriculture (USDA), and the FBI began investigating in February 2021.

Feeding Our Future's political supporters, including both Democratic and Republican state senators, advocated for the organization to receive funding or passed along constituent concerns that grants were being blocked by MDE. Bock maintained ties with local politicians, including Minneapolis mayor Jacob Frey and state senator Omar Fateh. An aide of Frey's, Abdi Salah, ultimately pled guilty to wire fraud; Frey stated he was unaware of Salah's activities. Another supporter was Minneapolis council member Jamal Osman, whose wife operated a Feeding Our Future meal site which received more than $400,000 in funding. In December 2021, a group of Feeding Our Future operators met with Keith Ellison, the Minnesota's attorney general, stating that they were facing discrimination by state agencies. Ellison told them he would look into their claims, but took no further action; he later released a statement saying they had "tried to exploit [his] good faith engagement, but they were not successful." Also in 2021, Frey met with MDE to push MDE Commissioner Heather Mueller into restarting funding. Bock had prepared talking points for the meeting, which were delivered to Frey through Salah, although Frey denied using them during the meeting.

After MDE began delaying responses to Feeding Our Future's grant applications, the organization sued the state in November 2020, arguing that it was being discriminated against "because of race, national origin, color, and religion." In December 2020, MDE denied Feeding Our Future's ongoing grant applications and labeled the organization "severely deficient", leading to an attempt by MDE to terminate the partnership fully. Minnesota judge John Guthmann found in the spring of 2021 that there was no legal basis for stopping payments, and informed MDE that there could be a "real problem" if it did not resume processing Feeding Our Future's grant applications, although he did not formally order MDE to resume giving grants. Several months later, Guthmann held MDE in contempt of court for processing grant applications slowly and ordered the state agency to pay a fine of $47,500 to Feeding Our Future. After the fraud was uncovered, a report by Minnesota's Office of the Legislative Auditor found that the lawsuit had a chilling effect on MDE's oversight functions, and that MDE's "inadequate oversight 'created opportunities for fraud'". Years later, Guthmann and MDE traded statements blaming one another for the resumption of grants to Feeding Our Future.

Federal prosecutors allege that only around 3% of the funding granted to Feeding Our Future meal sites was spent on food, while the remainder was funneled to the individual conspirators involved in the fraud. At its peak, the organization listed 299 "meal sites", which purported to have served 90 million meals in less than 2 years (more than 120,000 meals per day). One site surveilled by the FBI claiming to serve 6,000 meals per day actually averaged around 40 visitors.

== Federal charges and legal proceedings ==
In January 2022, the FBI raided a number of Feeding Our Future locations, and the nonprofit was disestablished shortly thereafter. That fall, U.S. Attorney Andrew M. Luger announced federal charges against 47 former Feeding Our Future employees and contractors for their involvement in fraud. By October 2024, the number of indicted individuals had reached 70. One suspect was arrested just before boarding a flight out of the United States at Minneapolis–Saint Paul International Airport.

In the spring of 2024, a group of seven defendants were the first to go to trial. Near the end of the trial, an attempt was made to bribe a juror to vote to acquit with $120,000 in cash. The juror reported the incident and was dismissed to avoid the appearance of impropriety, along with another who heard about the incident from a relative. The jury was sequestered for the remainder of the trial. Of the first seven defendants, five were convicted on most charges against them, while two were acquitted. Several weeks later, five suspects, including three of the defendants from the first trial, were indicted on charges related to the bribery. One of the individuals indicted for bribery had been acquitted of fraud during the trial. All five suspects in the bribery case had pleaded guilty to the resultant charges by May 2025.

The second trial in the case began in February 2025 for Bock, the ringleader of the scheme, and a leading co-conspirator, Salim Said. On March 19, 2025, Bock and Said were both found guilty on all counts. In May 2026, Bock was sentenced to more than 41 years imprisonment (500 months) and ordered to pay more than $240 million in restitution.

By July 2026, out of 80 suspects indicted in the fraud, 69 had been found guilty, including 62 via plea deals. Seven had been found guilty at trial, while a number of others awaited trial. 23 perpetrators, including Bock, have been sentenced. Although more than $250 million is alleged to have been stolen, only around $75 million had been recovered as of early 2025, as much of the money was spent on unrecoverable expenses like luxury meals and hotels, or was transferred to overseas investments which the United States cannot seize. Joe Thompson, the lead federal prosecutor, estimated that total fraud from the case may approach $500 million.

== Responses ==
Most, though not all, of those charged and convicted in the case were members of Minnesota's Somali American community. The case led to internal debate and discussion in the Minnesota Somali American community and broader political arena. Bock, the leader of Feeding our Future, accused state agencies of discrimination against the Somali community in the months before charges were filed. A report by Minnesota's Office of the Legislative Auditor found that the threat of "negative press" had an impact on regulation by the state. A former fraud investigator for the Attorney General of Minnesota's office, Kayseh Magan, suggested that state agencies were hesitant to take action against Feeding Our Future for fear of political backlash or being perceived as prejudiced. U.S. Attorney Thompson told the New York Times that "allegations of racism can be a reputation or career killer."

In 2023, state lawmakers created an Office of Inspector General within MDE, describing it as having the "investigatory power" that was lacking during the Feeding Our Future case. They also enacted regulatory changes increasing documentation requirements for social services providers. Amidst ongoing investigation into the Feeding Our Future case, potential fraud was identified and investigated in a number of other state-run social services schemes, including emergency housing, autism therapy for children, home health assistance, and Medicaid. Minnesota drew media attention in 2025 for the set of fraud scandals, with U.S. Attorney Thompson writing that the state had become "a national poster child for public corruption". State lawmakers, who had been working on the issue legislatively for several years, responded to the national spotlight in varied ways. Rep. Kristin Robbins (R) said that "most of the fraud is in the Somali community, and some of my best whistleblowers are in the Somali community". In 2026, the state created a fully independent Office of Inspector General in Minnesota to investigate fraud.

In 2025, the Feeding Our Future case was cited by President Donald Trump as a reason to cut off temporary protected status for some Somali refugees in Minnesota. Trump's administration launched an immigration operation in Minnesota in late 2025. The immigration operation, initially targeting the Somali American community, was called Operation Metro Surge, although about 92% of those with Somali descent in the United States are American citizens. Despite more than 3700 arrests in the operation, only 106 arrestees were Somali (fewer than 3%), and none had ties to Feeding our Future or other frauds under investigation. Following the killing of Renée Good by a federal agent in January 2026, amidst Operation Metro Surge, the prosecution of Feeding Our Future faced setbacks due to the resignation of six federal prosecutors, including Thompson. Law professor Mark Osler described the resignations as a "very big blow" to the case. Another eight prosecutors in the office departed shortly thereafter, limiting "the number and complexity of new cases" that the office could prosecute.

== See also ==
- 2020s Minnesota fraud scandals
- Crime in Minnesota
- Impact of the COVID-19 pandemic on crime
- School meal programs in the United States
