= Murder of Katherine Ann Olson =

2007 murder in Savage, Minnesota

- Location: Savage, Minnesota, U.S.
- Date: October 25, 2007
- Attack type: Murder by shooting
- Weapon: .357 Magnum
- Deaths: 1
- Injuries: 0
- Victim: Katherine Ann Olson
- Perpetrator: 1
- Verdict: Guilty of First-degree murder
- Convictions: First degree murder
- Convicted: Michael John Anderson
- Litigation: Supreme Court of Minnesota affirmed the verdict in October 2014.

Michael John Anderson (born October 16, 1988, in Savage, Minnesota) was convicted of having murdered Katherine Ann Olson in October 2007. Because Anderson met Olson through Craigslist, a popular classified advertising website, the media dubbed him a Craigslist Killer, a generic term for murderers who find victims by placing or responding to ads on Craigslist. Anderson was the first killer given this title in news accounts.

== The crime ==
Michael John Anderson, age 19, murdered Katherine Ann Olson (September 16, 1983–October 25, 2007), a 24-year-old theater and Hispanic studies graduate of St. Olaf College and temporary nanny, on October 25, 2007, in Savage, Minnesota, after seeing an ad for her services as a nanny on Craigslist.

The prosecution charged that Anderson created and posted a fake advertisement on Craigslist "in order to lure a woman to his home so he might experience what it felt like to kill."

Posing as a married woman named "Amy" who was looking for nanny services, Anderson exchanged emails with Olson. When she arrived at his parents' house for an interview, he shot her in the back with a .357 Magnum and put her body into the trunk of her car. He then drove to Burnsville Nature Preserve, where he abandoned it. The car containing Olson's body was discovered on October 26, 2007.

== Conviction ==
Psychiatrists hired by the defense diagnosed Anderson with Asperger syndrome, a form of autism. Anderson's attorneys contended that the disorder played a key role in the shooting and explained Anderson's behavior after the shooting. The judge refused to allow evidence of the diagnosis to be presented in court, ruling there was no proof the disorder was connected to the crime and that it could invite jurors to speculate about diminished capacity, which is "not recognized in Minnesota."

Anderson, who was the first murderer referred to by the media as a "Craigslist Killer", was found guilty of first degree murder and received a life sentence without parole on April 1, 2009.

Alan Margoles, the lead attorney arguing in Anderson's defense, stated that the killing of Olson was "accidental" and that he plans an appeal because during the trial he had not been allowed to present evidence that Anderson has Asperger syndrome. The Supreme Court of Minnesota affirmed the verdict and sentence on appeal in October 2014.

Anderson is currently incarcerated at Oak Park Heights prison.
