= List of pubs in London =

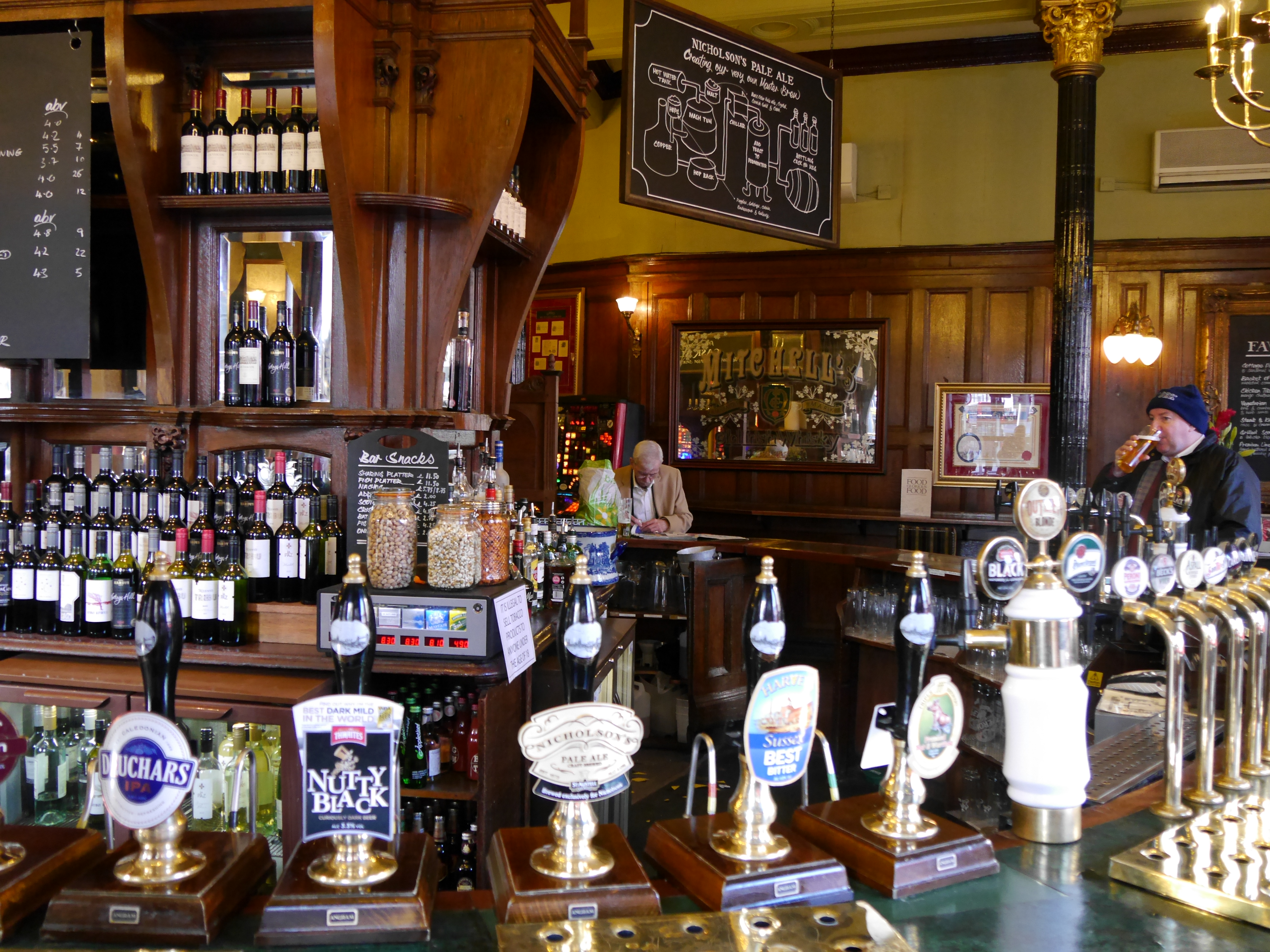
Typical interior. The Falcon Inn, Battersea

This is a list of notable pubs in the boroughs of Greater London, England. Pubs are drinking establishments licensed to serve alcohol, and can be a focal point for a local community. There were 4,835 pubs in London in 2001; by 2016 this had fallen to 3,615.

== London pubs by borough ==
=== Barking and Dagenham ===
| Image | Name | Owner | Date | Listing? | Notes |
|---|---|---|---|---|---|
| | Cross Keys, Dagenham | | 15th century | II | Crown St, Dagenham |
| | Eastbrook | | 1938 | II* | Dagenham Rd, Dagenham |

=== Barnet ===
| Image | Name | Owner | Date | Listing? | Notes |
|---|---|---|---|---|---|
| | Mitre Inn, Chipping Barnet | | 1633 | II | 58 High St, Chipping Barnet |
| | The Red Lion, Chipping Barnet | | | | High St, Chipping Barnet |
| | Rising Sun, Mill Hill | | 17th century | II | 137 Marsh Lane, Mill Hill |
| | Spaniards Inn | | 17th century | II | Spaniards Rd |
| | The Tally Ho, Finchley | Stonegate Pub Company | 1927 | | High Rd, North Finchley |

=== Bexley ===
| Image | Name | Owner | Date | Listing? | Notes |
|---|---|---|---|---|---|
| | Black Prince | | | | Now the Holiday Inn |
| | King's Head, Bexley | | 16th/17th century | II | 65 Bexley High Street, Bexley |
| | Royal Oak, Bexleyheath | | 19th century | II | Mount Road, Bexleyheath |

=== Brent ===
| Image | Name | Owner | Date | Listing? | Notes |
|---|---|---|---|---|---|
| | Windermere, South Kenton | Courage | 1938 | | Windermere Avenue, South Kenton |

=== Bromley ===
| Image | Name | Owner | Date | Listing? | Notes |
|---|---|---|---|---|---|
| | The Bull, Chislehurst | | 18th century | II | Main Road, Chislehurst, |
| | The Daylight Inn | | 1935 | II | Station Square, Petts Wood |
| | Kings Arms, Leaves Green | | 18th century | II | Leaves Green Road, Leaves Green |
| | Old Jail, Biggin Hill | | 18th century | II | Jail Lane, Biggin Hill, Westerham |

=== Camden ===
| Image | Name | Owner | Date | Listing? | Notes |
|---|---|---|---|---|---|
| | Assembly House, Kentish Town | | 1898 | II | 292 Kentish Town Rd |
| | The Black Cap | | | | Gay bar, now closed. |
| | The Boot, Cromer Street | | 1801 | | Headquarters of the Gordon rioters and mentioned in Charles Dickens' Barnaby Rudge. Rebuilt 1810 |
| | Black Lion, Kilburn | | 1898 | II* | 274 Kilburn High Rd |
| | Bull & Gate | | 1871 | II | 389 Kentish Town Rd |
| | The Camden Head | | 1787 | | Camden High St |
| | Cittie of Yorke | | 1430 | II | High Holborn. Rebuilt 1920s |
| | Cross Keys, Covent Garden | | 1848 | II | 31 Endell St |
| | Crown and Anchor, Euston | Mitchells and Butlers | 19th century | II | 137 Drummond St |
| | Dublin Castle, Camden | | c.1856 | | 94 Parkway |
| | The Duke of Hamilton | | | | 23 New End |
| | Duke of York, Bloomsbury | | 1938 | II | 7 Roger St |
| | The Duke of York, Fitzrovia | Greene King | 1791 | | 47 Rathbone St |
| | The Falcon, Camden | | | | 234 Royal College Street. Closed in 2002, converted to flats. |
| | The Flask, Hampstead | Young's Brewery | 1874 | II | 14 Flask Walk. Rebuilt 1874 |
| | Freemasons' Tavern | | 18th century | | 61–65 Great Queen Street. Hosted first meeting of the Football Association. Now demolished. |
| | George and Dragon, Fitzrovia | | c.1850 | II | 151 Cleveland St |
| | Greene Man | Greene King | 18th century | | 383 Euston Road |
| | The Holly Bush, Hampstead | Fuller's Brewery | c.1797 | II | Holly Mount |
| | Jack Straw's Castle, Hampstead | | 1964 | II | Rebuilt 1964. Now an apartment block. |
| | The Lamb, Bloomsbury | | 1720s | II | 94 Lamb's Conduit Street |
| | The Magdala | | | | Scene of murder by Ruth Ellis. Converted to flats. |
| | Museum Tavern | | 1864 | II | 49 Great Russell Street, Bloomsbury, |
| | The Old Bull and Bush | Mitchells and Butlers | | II | Near Hampstead Heath. Gave name to music-hall song. |
| | Old Red Lion, Holborn | | 1899 | | 72 High Holborn |
| | Old White Bear | | 1704 | | 1 Well Road, Hampstead. Saved from closure by petition |
| | Ye Olde Mitre | Fuller's Brewery | 1773 | II | 1 Ely Court, Ely Place, Holborn |
| | The Perseverance | | 18th century | II | 63 Lamb's Conduit Street, Bloomsbury. Refronted 19th century. |
| | The Pineapple, Kentish Town | | c.1868 | II | 51 Leverton Street, Kentish Town |
| | Prince of Wales, Euston | | 1860s | II | 119 Hampstead Road, Euston. Now a cocktail bar |
| | Princess Louise, Holborn | Samuel Smith Old Brewery | 1872 | II* | High Holborn |
| | The Punch Tavern | | c.1895 | II | 98–100 Fleet Street, Holborn. Rebuilt 1894–1897 |
| | Queen's Hotel, Primrose Hill | Young's | 1855 | | Regent's Park Road, Primrose Hill |
| | Rising Sun, Euston | Mitchells and Butlers | 1899 | II | 120 Euston Road, Euston. Now renamed The Rocket |
| | Rising Sun, Fitzrovia | Taylor Walker Pubs | 1896 | II | 46 Tottenham Court Road, Fitzrovia |
| | Seven Stars, Holborn | | 17th century | II | 53-54 Carey Street, Holborn |
| | Ship Tavern, Holborn | | 1549 | | Lincoln's Inn Fields. Rebuilt 1923 |
| | Sir Richard Steele (public house) | | | | Haverstock Hill |
| | The Tipperary | | 1667 | II | 66, Fleet St |
| | Upper Flask | | | | Hampstead Hill. Demolished |
| | The Washington, Belsize Park | | 1865 | II | 50, Englands La. |
| | Wells Tavern, Hampstead | | 1849 | II | 30, Well Walk |
| | The Wheatsheaf, Fitzrovia | | | | 25, Rathbone Place |
| | The Winchester, Highgate | | 1881 | | 206, Archway Rd, Closed 2016. |
| | The World's End, Camden | | | | 174 Camden High St |
| | The Yorkshire Grey | | 1676 | II | 29 Grays Inn Rd |

=== City of London ===
| Image | Name | Owner | Date | Listing? | Notes |
|---|---|---|---|---|---|
| | Bell Savage Inn | | 15th century | | Ludgate Hill. Demolished. |
| | The Black Friar, Blackfriars | Nicholsons | 1875 | II* | Queen Victoria St, Blackfriars |
| | Boar's Head Inn, Eastcheap | | 16th century | | Eastcheap. Demolished. |
| | Dirty Dicks | | | | Bishopgate |
| | East India Arms | Shepherd Neame | 1829 | | Fenchurch St |
| | The Fortune of War Public House | | | | Cock Lane, Smithfield. Demolished 1910. |
| | George and Vulture | Samuel Smith Old Brewery | 1748 | II | Lombard St. Frequented by Charles Dickens and mentioned in his writings. |
| | Hand and Shears | | 19th century | II | Middle St, Smithfield |
| | Hoop and Grapes | | 17th century | II* | 46-47 Aldgate High St |
| | Hoop and Grapes | | 18th century | II | 80 Farringdon St |
| | Jamaica Wine House | Shepherd Neame | | II | St Michael's Alley, Cornhill. Locally known as The Jampot. Was the first coffeehouse in London. Frequented by Samuel Pepys. |
| | The Old Bank of England | Fullers | 1886 | II | 194 Fleet St |
| | Old Bell | | 17th century | II* | 95 Fleet St |
| | Ye Olde Cheshire Cheese | Samuel Smith Old Brewery | 1538 | II | 145 Fleet St. Once frequented by Charles Dickens, G.K. Chesterton and Mark Twain. |
| | Ye Olde Cock Tavern | Taylor Walker | Earlier than C17th | II | 22 Fleet St. Once frequented by Samuel Pepys, Alfred Tennyson and Charles Dickens |
| | Viaduct Tavern | | 1875 | II | 126 Newgate St, Holborn |

=== Croydon ===
| Image | Name | Owner | Date | Listing? | Notes |
|---|---|---|---|---|---|
| | Dog & Bull | Laine (Punch Pubs) | 18th century | II | On site of 12/13th century The Bell |

=== Ealing ===
| Image | Name | Owner | Date | Listing? | Notes |
|---|---|---|---|---|---|
| | The Drayton Court | Fullers Brewery | 1894 | | 2 The Avenue |
| | Duke of Kent, Ealing | | 1929 | | 2 Scotch Common |
| | The Forester, Ealing | | 1909 | II | Leighton Road, Northfields, |
| | The Fox Inn, Hanwell | | 1848 | | Green Lane, Hanwell |
| | Half-Way House, West Ealing | | | | Closed. |
| | Kings Arms, Hanwell | | 1830 | | 110 Uxbridge Road, Hanwell. Rebuilt 1930. |
| | Three Horseshoes, Southall | | 1922 | | Uxbridge Road and South Road. Closed. |

=== Enfield ===
| Image | Name | Owner | Date | Listing? | Notes |
|---|---|---|---|---|---|
| | Bell Inn, Enfield | | 19th century | II | Hertford Road |
| | The Crown and Horseshoes | | | II | Horseshoe Lane |
| | Fallow Buck Inn | | | II | Clay Hill |
| | The Fox, Palmers Green | | 1682 | | Green Lanes, Palmers Green. Rebuilt 1904. Featured in the film Harry Potter and the Prisoner of Azkaban. |
| | Ye Olde Cherry Tree | | | II | The Green, Southgate |
| | The Rose and Crown, Clay Hill | | | II | Clay Hill |
| | The White Horse, Enfield | | | II | Green St |

=== Greenwich ===
| Image | Name | Owner | Date | Listing? | Notes |
|---|---|---|---|---|---|
| | Cutty Sark, Greenwich | | 19th century | II | 6–7 Ballast Quay |
| | Kings Arms, Woolwich | | | | 1 Frances St. Bombed by the IRA in 1974. Now [2018] closed (to be demolished). |
| | The Mitre, Greenwich | Convivial London Pubs | c.1840 | II | 291 Greenwich High Road |
| | Spanish Galleon, Greenwich | Shepherd Neame | 1836 | II | 1 College Approach |
| | Sun in the Sands | | 1745 | | Between Blackheath and Shooter's Hill |
| | Trafalgar Tavern | | 1837 | II | Park Row, on the south bank of the River Thames |

=== Hackney ===
| Image | Name | Owner | Date | Listing? | Notes |
|---|---|---|---|---|---|
| | Army and Navy, Stoke Newington | | 1936 | II | 1–3 Matthias Road, Stoke Newington |
| | Baxter's Court, Hackney | Wetherspoons | 2003 | | 282 Mare Street, Hackney. For sale (September 2025). |
| | The Dolphin, Hackney | | c.1850 | II | 165 Mare Street, Hackney |
| | George and Dragon, Shoreditch | | | | 2-4 Hackney Road, Shoreditch. LBGT bar. Closing. |
| | The Globe in Morning Lane | Craft Union | 1960 | | 20 Morning Lane, Hackney |
| | The Joiners Arms | | | | 118 Hackney Road, Shoreditch. LGBT pub and nightclub. |
| | Pub on the Park | | 1855 | | 19 Martello Street, Hackney (formerly Eleanor Road) |
| | Rose and Crown, Stoke Newington | | 1932 | II | 199 Stoke Newington Church Street |
| | Stag's Head, Hoxton | | 1936 | II | 55 Orsman Road, Hoxton |
| | The Wenlock Arms | | 1836 | | between Old Street and Angel.Saved from demolition by petition, 2010. |

=== Hammersmith and Fulham ===
| Image | Name | Owner | Date | Listing? | Notes |
|---|---|---|---|---|---|
| | Aragon House | | 1805 | II | 247 New King's Road, Fulham |
| | Black Lion, Hammersmith | | 18th century | II | South Black Lion Lane, Hammersmith |
| | Blue Anchor, Hammersmith | Property Trust Group | 1722 | | 13 Lower Mall, Hammersmith. Gustav Holst composed his Hammersmith Suite here. |
| | The Brown Cow, Parsons Green | | | | 676 Fulham Rd, Fulham |
| | The Cock, Fulham | Young's | 19th century | II | 360 North End Road, Fulham. Now Cock Tavern. |
| | The Cross Keys, Hammersmith | Fuller's Brewery | | | 57 Black Lion Lane, Hammersmith |
| | The Dove, Hammersmith | | 18th century | II | 19 Upper Mall, Hammersmith. Listed in the Guinness Book of Records as the smallest public bar in the UK. |
| | Duke of Cumberland, Fulham | Young's | 1892 | | 235 New King's Road, Fulham. Now called Duke on the Green. |
| | Eight Bells, Fulham | | | | Fulham High Street |
| | The George, Hammersmith | Belushi's | 1911 | | 28 Hammersmith Broadway |
| | Golden Lion, Fulham | | c.1820 | | Fulham High Street |
| | Hampshire Hog | | 1883 | | 227 King Street |
| | The Hop Poles | | 1857 | II | 17–19 King Street |
| | Hope and Anchor, Hammersmith | | 1936 | II | 20 Macbeth Street. Closed. |
| | The King's Head, Fulham | | | II | 4 Fulham High Street, Fulham |
| | Laurie Arms | | c.1881 | | 238 Shepherd's Bush Road |
| | The Queen Adelaide | | c.1900 | II | 412 Uxbridge Road, Shepherd's Bush |
| | Queen's Head, Brook Green | | 1796 | | 13 Brook Green. Frequented by Dick Turpin. |
| | Princess Victoria, Uxbridge Road | Three Cheers Pub Company. | 1829 | | Uxbridge Road, Shepherd's Bush |
| | Rutland Arms, Hammersmith | | 1849 | | 15 Lower Mall |
| | Salutation, Hammersmith | Fuller's Brewery | 1910 | II | 154 King Street |
| | The Swan, Hammersmith | | | II | 46 Hammersmith Broadway |
| | Temperance Billiard Hall, Fulham | | 1910 | II | Fulham High Street. Now called the Temperance |
| | The White Horse, Fulham | | | | Parson's Green. Known as the "Sloaney Pony" |

=== Haringey ===
| Image | Name | Owner | Date | Listing? | Notes |
|---|---|---|---|---|---|
| | Great Northern Railway, Hornsey | | 1900 | II | High Street, Hornsey |
| | Queens, Crouch End | | 1902 | II* | Elder Avenue/Tottenham Lane, Crouch End |
| | The Salisbury | | 1899 | II* | Grand Parade, Harringay |

=== Harrow ===
| Image | Name | Owner | Date | Listing? | Notes |
|---|---|---|---|---|---|
| | The Castle, Harrow | | 1901 | II | West Street, Harrow-on-the-Hill |
| | Queen's Head, Pinner | | 16th century | II | 31 High Street, Pinner |
| | Rayners, Rayners Lane | | 1937 | II | 23 Village Way East, Rayners Lane. Closed. |
| | Seven Balls | | 17th century | II | Kenton Lane, Harrow Weald |

=== Havering ===
| Image | Name | Owner | Date | Listing? | Notes |
|---|---|---|---|---|---|
| | The Golden Lion, Romford | | 17th century | II | 2 High Street, Romford |

=== Hillingdon ===
| Image | Name | Owner | Date | Listing? | Notes |
|---|---|---|---|---|---|
| | The Angel, Hayes | Fuller's Brewery | 1926 | II | 697 Uxbridge Road, Hayes, |
| | Black Horse, Eastcote | | 19th century | II | High Rd, Eastcote |
| | Case is Altered, Eastcote | | 16th century | II | Southill Lane, Eastcote |
| | Crown and Treaty | | 1576 | II* | Oxford Road, Uxbridge. Treaty of Uxbridge negotiated here. |
| | The Crown, Cowley | | 16th century | II | High St, Cowley |
| | Queen's Head, Uxbridge | | 19th century | | 54 Windsor Street, Uxbridge |
| | Red Lion, Hillingdon | | 16th century | II | Royal Lane, Hillingdon. Refronted c.1800. |
| | The Shovel, Cowley | | Early 19th century | | Iver Lane, Cowley. Now called the Malt Shovel. |
| | The Swan Inn, Ruislip | | 16th century | II | High Street, Ruislip. Closed. |
| | Three Tuns, Uxbridge | | 16th/17th century | II | 24 High Street, Uxbridge |

=== Hounslow ===
| Image | Name | Owner | Date | Listing? | Notes |
|---|---|---|---|---|---|
| | Bull's Head, Strand-on-the-Green | | 18th century | II | 15 Strand-on-the-Green, Chiswick |
| | Coach and Horses, Isleworth | | 18th century | II | London Road, Isleworth. Mentioned in Charles Dickens Oliver Twist |
| | George and Devonshire | | 18th century | II | Burlington Lane, Chiswick |
| | London Apprentice, Isleworth | | 18th century | II* | 62 Church Street, Isleworth |
| | Mawson Arms | | | II* | 110 Chiswick Lane South, Chiswick |
| | Old Packhorse | | | II | Chiswick High Road, Chiswick |
| | Rose and Crown, Isleworth | | 18th century | II | London Road, Isleworth, |
| | The Tabard, Chiswick | | 1880 | II* | Bedford Park, Chiswick |

=== Islington ===
| Image | Name | Owner | Date | Listing? | Notes |
|---|---|---|---|---|---|
| | The Angel, Islington | J D Wetherspoon | 1998 | | Islington High Street and Pentonville Road |
| | The Crown, Islington | | 19th century | II | 116 Cloudesley Road, Islington |
| | Fox and Anchor | | 1898 | | 115 Charterhouse Street, Farringdon |
| | Flying Scotsman, Kings Cross | | 1901 | | 2–4 Caledonian Road, Kings Cross. Now the Scottish Stores. |
| | The Hope | | 19th century | II | 94 Cowcross Street, Smithfield |
| | The Hope and Anchor, Islington | Greene King | 1880 | II | 207, Upper St |
| | The Island Queen | | 1851 | II | 87 Noel Road |
| | The Old Queens Head | The Columbo Group | | II | Essex Rd |
| | The Old Red Lion, Islington | | | II | The Angel, Islington. Pub fringe theatre. |
| | Peacock Inn, Islington | | | | 11 Islington High Street. Closed. Mentioned in Tom Brown's Schooldays and Nicholas Nickleby. |
| | Slug and Lettuce, Islington | | 19th century | II | Islington Green, Previously The Fox. |
| | The White Bear, Clerkenwell | | 1899 | II | 57 St John Street, Clerkenwell |

=== Kensington and Chelsea ===
| Image | Name | Owner | Date | Listing? | Notes |
|---|---|---|---|---|---|
| | Anglesea Arms | | 19th century | II | 15 Selwood Terrace, South Kensington, |
| | Bunch of Grapes | | Mid-19th century | II | 207 Brompton Road, Knightsbridge |
| | Chelsea Potter | | 1842 | | 119 King's Road, Chelsea. Previously the Commercial Tavern. |
| | Coleherne, Earls Court | | 1866 | | 261 Old Brompton Road, Earls Court. Now The Pembroke gastropub. |
| | Crocker's Folly | | 1898 | II* | 24 Aberdeen Place, St John's Wood |
| | The Cross Keys, Chelsea | | 1708 | | 1 Lawrence Street, Chelsea. |
| | Drayton Arms, Earls Court | | 19th century | II | 153 Old Brompton Road, Earls Court, |
| | Elgin, Ladbroke Grove | | Mid-19th century | II | 96 Ladbroke Grove |
| | Fitzroy Tavern | Samuel Smith Old Brewery | 1883 | | 16 Charlotte Street |
| | Fox and Pheasant | James Blunt | 1848 | | 1 Billing Road, Chelsea |
| | Goat in Boots | | | | 333 Fulham Road, Chelsea. Now the Goat, an Italian restaurant and cocktail bar |
| | The Goat, Kensington | | 1695 | | 3a Kensington High Street |
| | The Hansom Cab | | | II | 84–86 Earls Court Road, Kensington |
| | Hollywood Arms, Chelsea | | 1865 | II | 45 Hollywood Rd, Chelsea |
| | The King's Head and Eight Bells | | Early 19th century | II | 50 Cheyne Walk, Chelsea |
| | Lord High Admiral, Pimlico | | 1967 | II* | 43 Vauxhall Bridge Road, Pimlico |
| | Newman Arms | | 1730 | | 23 Rathbone Street, Fitzrovia |
| | The Punch Bowl, Mayfair | | c.1750 | II | 41 Farm Street, Mayfair |
| | The Phene | The City Pub Company | Mid-19th century | | 9 Phene Street, Chelsea |
| | Prince of Teck, Earl's Court | | 1868 | | 161 Earls Court Road, Earls Court |
| | Rising Sun, Fitzrovia | Taylor Walker | | II | 46 Tottenham Court Road, Fitzrovia, |
| | Scarsdale Tavern | | | | 23a Edwardes Square, Kensington |
| | The Sherlock Holmes | | | | Northumberland Street. Sherlock Holmes memorabilia. |
| | The Shuckburgh Arms, Chelsea | | Mid-19th century | | Corner of Denyer Street and Milner Street. Now closed. |
| | Swan & Edgar, Marylebone | | | | 43 Linhope Street, Marylebone, Now closed |
| | The Wheatsheaf, Fitzrovia | | | | Rathbone Place, Fitzrovia |
| | Windsor Castle, Kensington | | 1826 | II | 114 Campden Hill Road |
| | The World's End, Chelsea | | 1897 | | 459 King's Road, Chelsea, |
| | Zetland Arms | Taylor Walker | 1840s | | Old Brompton Road |

=== Kingston upon Thames ===
| Image | Name | Owner | Date | Listing? | Notes |
|---|---|---|---|---|---|
| | Druid's Head | | 17th century | II* | 3 Market Place |

=== Lambeth ===
| Image | Name | Owner | Date | Listing? | Notes |
|---|---|---|---|---|---|
| | The Bobbin, Clapham | | 19th century | II | 1–3 Lillieshall Road, Clapham. Originally The Tim Bobbin |
| | The Commercial, Herne Hill | | | | 210-212 Railton Road, Herne Hill |
| | The Duke of Edinburgh, Brixton | | 1937 | II | 204 Ferndale Road, Brixton |
| | King's Arms, Waterloo | | | II | 25 Roupell Street, Waterloo |
| | Old Red Lion, Kennington | | 1929 | II | 42 Kennington Park Road, Kennington |
| | Queen's Head, Brixton | | | II | 144 Stockwell Road, Brixton. Closed in 2024. |
| | Royal Vauxhall Tavern | | | II | Spring Gardens, Kennington Lane |

=== Lewisham ===
| Image | Name | Owner | Date | Listing? | Notes |
|---|---|---|---|---|---|
| | Amersham Arms | | 19th century | | New Cross Rd, New Cross |
| | Blythe Hill Tavern | | 19th century | | 319 Stanstead Road, Forest Hill |
| | Fellowship Inn | | 20th century | II | Bellingham |
| | Goldsmiths Tavern | | 19th century | | New Cross Road, New Cross. Closed 2003, now called New Cross House. |
| | Hare and Billet | Greene King | 17th century | | Hare & Billet Road, Blackheath |
| | The Montague Arms | | 20th century | | Queen's Road, Telegraph Hill. Closed 2018. |
| | New Cross Inn | | 19th century | | New Cross Road, New Cross |

=== Merton ===
| Image | Name | Owner | Date | Listing? | Notes |
|---|---|---|---|---|---|
| | Crooked Billet, Wimbledon | | early-18th century | | 14–15 Crooked Billet, |

=== Newham ===
| Image | Name | Owner | Date | Listing? | Notes |
|---|---|---|---|---|---|
| | Boleyn Tavern | | 1900 | II | 1 Barking Road, Plaistow |
| | Denmark Arms | | c.1890 | II | 381 Barking Road, East Ham |
| | Earl of Essex, Manor Park | | 1902 | II | 616 Romford Road, Manor Park. Now closed. |
| | King Edward VII, Stratford | | 18th century | II | 47 Broadway, Stratford. Previously the King of Prussia. |
| | Spotted Dog, Forest Gate | | 16th century | II | 212 Upton Lane, Forest Gate. Closed and derelict. |

=== Richmond upon Thames ===
| Image | Name | Owner | Date | Listing? | Notes |
|---|---|---|---|---|---|
| | Britannia, Richmond | | 18th century | II | 5 Brewers Lane |
| | The Bull's Head, Barnes | Geronimo Inns | | | 373 Lonsdale Road. Jazz pub. |
| | Dysart Arms | | 1904 | | 135, Petersham Road. Now a restaurant. |
| | The Fox, Twickenham | | 18th century | II | 39 Church Street |
| | Hare and Hounds, Sheen | Young's | Early 19th-century | II | 216 Upper Richmond Rd |
| | The New Inn, Ham Common | | 18th century | II | Ham Common |
| | Old Ship, Richmond | Young's | 18th century | II | 82 George Street |
| | Sun Inn, Barnes | | Mid-18th century | II | 7 Church Road, Barnes |
| | White Cross, Richmond | | Mid-19th century | II | Riverside |
| | The White Swan, Twickenham | | 18th century | II | Twickenham Riverside |

=== Southwark ===
| Image | Name | Owner | Date | Listing? | Notes |
|---|---|---|---|---|---|
| | Anchor Bankside | | 19th century | | Bankside |
| | The Crown and Greyhound | | | II | 73 Dulwich Village, Dulwich, |
| | Dog and Duck, St George's Fields | | | | Demolished |
| | The George Inn, Southwark | | 1677 | I | Borough High St |
| | Half Moon, Herne Hill | | 1896 | II* | 10 Half Moon Lane, Herne Hill |
| | Herne Tavern | | Mid-19th century | | 2 Forest Hill Rd, Honor Oak, |
| | The Ivy House | | 1930s | II | 40 Stuart Road, Nunhead |
| | Lord Nelson, Bermondsey | | Early-19th century | II | 386, Old Kent Road, Bermondsey |
| | The Roebuck | | Late-19th century | II | 50 Great Dover Street, Borough |
| | The Shipwrights Arms | | Mid-19th century | II | 88 Tooley Street, London Bridge |
| | The Tabard | | 1307 | | Borough High Street. Now demolished |
| | The Wheatsheaf | | 1840 | II | 6 Stoney Street, Borough, |

=== Tower Hamlets ===
| Image | Name | Owner | Date | Listing? | Notes |
|---|---|---|---|---|---|
| | Black Horse, Stepney | | Early 19th century | II | 168 Mile End Road, Stepney. Now a club. |
| | The Blind Beggar | | 1894 | | Whitechapel Road, Whitechapel |
| | The Clement Attlee | | 2025 | | 576 Commercial Road, Limehouse |
| | Commercial Tavern | | c.1865 | II | 142 Commercial Street, Spitalfields, Shoreditch |
| | Charlie Brown's (Railway Tavern) | | c.1840 | | Garford Street and the West India Dock Road. Demolished 1989. |
| | George Tavern | Pauline Forster | 1820 | II | 373 Commercial Road |
| | Golden Heart, Spitalfields | Truman's Brewery | 1926 | II | 110 Commercial Street |
| | The Gun, Coldharbour | | Early 18th century | II | 27 Coldharbour, Coldharbour, |
| | The Grapes | | 1720s | II | 76, Narrow Street, Limehouse |
| | Owl and Pussycat, Shoreditch | Geronimo Inns | 18th century | II | 34 Redchurch Street, Shoreditch |
| | The Palm Tree, Mile End | Truman's Brewery | 1935 | II | 127 Grove Road, Mile End |
| | The Pride of Spitalfields | 19th century | | | 3 Heneage Street. Formerly the Romford Arms |
| | Prospect of Whitby | | 1520 | II | 57 Wapping Wall |
| | The Royal Oak, Bethnal Green | Truman's Brewery | 1923 | II | 73 Columbia Road, Bethnal Green |
| | Ten Bells | | 18th century | II | Commercial Street and Fournier Street, Spitalfields |
| | Town of Ramsgate | | 1758 | II | Wapping |
| | The Widow's Son, London | | Early 19th century | II* | 75 Devons Road, Bromley-by-Bow |

=== Waltham Forest ===
| Image | Name | Owner | Date | Listing? | Notes |
|---|---|---|---|---|---|
| | Bull and Crown, Chingford | | 1898 | II | The Green, Chingford. Now closed and converted to restaurant. |
| | Ferry Boat Inn, Walthamstow | | 18th century | II | |
| | Green Man, Leytonstone | | 1920s | | Rebranded as part of the O'Neill's chain. |

=== Wandsworth ===
| Image | Name | Owner | Date | Listing? | Notes |
|---|---|---|---|---|---|
| | The Alchemist, Battersea | | | | 225 St John's Hill, Battersea. Now demolished. |
| | The Bedford, Balham | | c1931 | II | 77 Bedford Hill, Balham |
| | Brewery Tap, Wandsworth. | | 1883 | II | 68 Wandsworth High Street. Formerly the Ram Inn. |
| | Bricklayer's Arms, Putney | Timothy Taylor's | 1826 | | Waterman St, Putney |
| | The Duke's Head, Putney | | 1864 | II | 8 Lower Richmond Road, Putney |
| | Falcon, Battersea | | Late 19th century | II | 2 St John's Hill, Battersea |
| | The Grapes, Wandsworth | | Mid-19th century | II | 39 Fairfield Street, Wandsworth |
| | Green Man, Putney | | c.1700 | | Wildcroft Road, Putney |
| | The Half Moon, Putney | | | | Lower Richmond Road. Music venue |
| | King's Head, Roehampton | | 17th century | II | 1 Roehampton High Street, Roehampton |
| | King's Head, Tooting | | 1896 | II | 84 Upper Tooting Road, Tooting |
| | Leather Bottle, Earlsfield | | Early 18th century | II | 538 Garratt Lane, Earlsfield |
| | Mason's Arms, Battersea | | Mid-19th century | II | Battersea Park Road, Battersea |
| | Montague Arms | | 17th century | II | 3 Medfield Street, Roehampton |
| | Spread Eagle, Wandsworth | | late 19th century | II | 69–71 Wandsworth High Street |
| | The Quill, Putney | | 19th century, rebuilt 1964, now flats | | 22 Charlwood Road, Putney |
| | The White Lion, Putney | | 1887 | II | 14–16 High Street, Putney, |

=== City of Westminster ===
| Image | Name | Owner | Date | Listing? | Notes |
|---|---|---|---|---|---|
| | The Albert | | 1862 | II | 52 Victoria Street, Victoria |
| | Angel and Crown, Covent Garden | | 18th/19th century | II | 58 St Martin's Lane, Covent Garden, |
| | Barley Mow, Marylebone | | 1791 | II | 8 Dorset Street, Marylebone |
| | Be at One, Covent Garden | | 1835 | II | 16 Exeter Street, Covent Garden. Formerly the Old Bell, |
| | The Beehive, Marylebone | | | II | 126 Crawford Street |
| | Carlton Tavern, Kilburn | | | | Carlton Vale. Demolished by developer. Developer ordered to rebuild facsimile. |
| | The Cheshire Cheese | | 1928 | II | 5 Little Essex Street |
| | The Clachan | | 1898 | II | 33 Kingly Street |
| | Coach and Horses, Mayfair | | 1740s | II | 5 Hill Street, Mayfair |
| | Coal Hole, Strand | | 1904 | II | 91 Strand |
| | The Crown, Covent Garden | Taylor Walker Pubs | 1833 | II | 43 Monmouth Street |
| | The Devereux | | 1843 | II | 20 Devereux Court, off Essex Street |
| | Duke of Wellington, Belgravia | | 19th century | II | 63 Eaton Terrace, Belgravia, |
| | The Duke of Wellington, Marylebone | | | II | 94a Crawford Street |
| | The Edgar Wallace | | 1777 | | 40–41 Essex Street. Originally the Essex Head |
| | Fitzroy Tavern | Samuel Smith Old Brewery | | | 16 Charlotte Street, Fitzrovia |
| | The Flying Horse | | 19th century | II* | 6 Oxford Street, Fitzrovia |
| | Freemasons Arms, Covent Garden | | | | Long Acre |
| | The Grenadier | | 1720 | | 18, Wilton Row, Belgravia. Originally the officers' mess of the 1st Regiment of Foot Guards |
| | The Harp | | | | 47 Chandos Place, Covent Garden |
| | Lamb and Flag, Covent Garden | | 1772 | II | Rose Street, Covent Garden |
| | The Marquis of Clanricarde | | Mid-19th century | II | 36 Southwick Street, Paddington |
| | The Marquis of Granby | | | | 2 Rathbone Street, Fitzrovia |
| | The Mitre, Bayswater | | Mid 19th century | II | 24 Craven Terrace, Bayswater |
| | Nag's Head, Covent Garden | | c.1900 | II | 10 James Street, Covent Garden |
| | Nell Gwynne Tavern | | early 19th century | II | 1–2 Bull Inn Court, Covent Garden |
| | The Old Shades | Faucet Inn | 1898 | II | 37–39 Whitehall |
| | The Only Running Footman | | | | Charles Street, Mayfair |
| | Paxtons Head | | 1902 | II | 153 Knightsbridge, London |
| | Plumbers Arms, Belgravia | | Mid-19th century | II | 14 Lower Belgrave Street, Belgravia |
| | Prince Alfred, Maida Vale | | 1856 | II | 5a Formosa Street, Maida Vale |
| | PS Tattershall Castle | | | | Embankment. A moored ex-ferry boat. |
| | The Punch Bowl, Mayfair | | c.1750 | II | 41 Farm Street, Mayfair |
| | Red Lion, St James's | | 1821 | II | 2 Duke of York Street, St James's, |
| | Red Lion, Westminster | Fuller's Brewery | 1890 | 48 Parliament Street | |
| | The Salisbury, Covent Garden | | 1899 | II | 91–93 St. Martin's Lane, Covent Garden |
| | The Ship, New Cavendish Street | | | II | New Cavendish Street |
| | Ship and Shovell | Hall and Woodhouse | | II | Craven Passage, Charing Cross |
| | Silver Cross Tavern | Taylor Walker Pubs | 1674 | II | Whitehall |
| | Star Tavern, Belgravia | | Mid-19th century | II | 6 Belgrave Mews West, Belgravia |
| | Swan Inn | | | II | 66 Bayswater Road |
| | The Tea Clipper | | 19th century | II | 19 Montpelier Street, Knightsbridge |
| | Two Brewers, Covent Garden | | 1839 | | 40 Monmouth Street |
| | Two Chairmen | | 1756 | II | Birdcage Walk |
| | The Victoria, Bayswater | | 1850 | II | 10a Strathearn Place, Bayswater |
| | The Warrington, Maida Vale | | Mid-19th century | II | Warrington Crescent, Maida Vale, |
| | Warwick Castle, Maida Vale | | 1846 | II | Warwick Place, Maida Vale |
| | White Lion, Covent Garden | Nicholsons, Mitchells & Butlers | 1888 | | James Street and Floral Street, Covent Garden |
| | The Wilton Arms | | 1826 | II | 10 Kinnerton Street, Belgravia |
| | Yorkshire Stingo | | | | Marylebone Road, Marylebone. Now demolished. |

==== Soho ====
| Image | Name | Owner | Date | Listing? | Notes |
|---|---|---|---|---|---|
| | The Admiral Duncan | | | | Old Compton Street. Gay bar. |
| | Argyll Arms | | 1868 | II* | 18 Argyll Street |
| | Candy Bar | | | | Carlisle St. Closed. |
| | Coach and Horses, Soho | | II | | 29 Greek Street |
| | The Colony Room | | | | 41 Dean Street |
| | Comptons of Soho | | 1890 | | 51–53 Old Compton Street |
| | De Hems | | 1890 | | Off Shaftesbury Avenue |
| | Dog and Duck, Soho | | 1897 | | 18 Bateman Street |
| | The French House, Soho | | 1891 | II | 49 Dean Street |
| | John Snow | | | | Broadwick Street |
| | Pillars of Hercules, Soho | | 1910 | | 7 Greek Street |
| | The Scots Hoose | | 1759 | | Cambridge Circus. Demolished |
| | Sun and 13 Cantons | | 1882 | II | 20 Great Pulteney Street |

== See also ==
- Pubs in Covent Garden
- Grade II listed pubs in London (category)
- List of award-winning pubs in London
- List of bars
- List of companies based in London
- List of public house topics
- List of real London pubs in literature
- List of restaurants in London
- Wetherspoons
