= Seven-ball (disambiguation) =

Seven-ball, sevenball, 7 ball, or 7-ball may refer to:

- 7 ball, the pool (pocket billiards) ball numbered "7", and traditionally brown or maroon, but tan in some ball sets
- 7 ball, the black snooker ball, worth 7 points, normally referred to as "the black"
- Seven-ball, a pool (pocket billiards) game, played with seven object balls, of which the 7 ball is the game-winning ball
- 7-Ball, the United States Army 101st Airborne Division Band Barbershop Quartet, whose logo features a pool 7 ball
- 7-ball, a seven-dimensional n-ball in mathematics
- Seven Balls, a Grade-II-listed pub at Kenton Lane, Harrow Weald, London, dating to ca. the 17th century
