= Rising Sun, Mill Hill =

Pub in Mill Hill, London

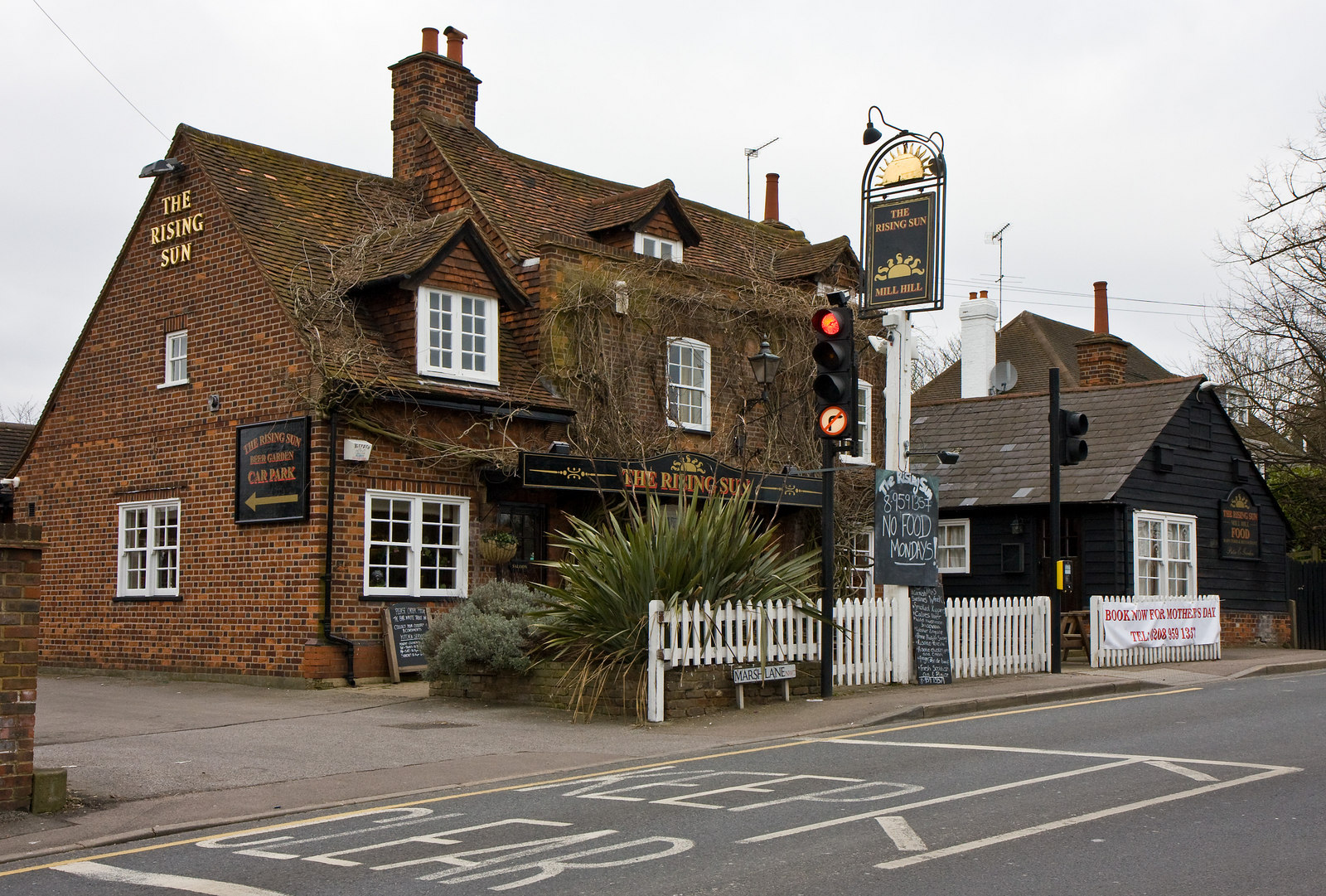
- The Rising Sun

- Location within London Borough of Barnet Location within Greater London

General information
- Location: Highwood Hill and 137 Marsh Lane, Mill Hill, London, England
- Coordinates: 51°37′37″N 0°14′31″W

Design and construction
- Designations

Listed Building – Grade II
- Official name: Rising Sun Public House
- Designated: 23 October 1974
- Reference no.: 1064908

The Rising Sun is a Grade II listed public house at Highwood Hill and 137 Marsh Lane, Mill Hill, London.

It was built in the late 17th century.

It is currently run by the Delnevo brothers and functions as a restaurant, with an Italian/ Asian-influenced menu.
