= Fallow Buck Inn =

Pub in Clay Hill, London

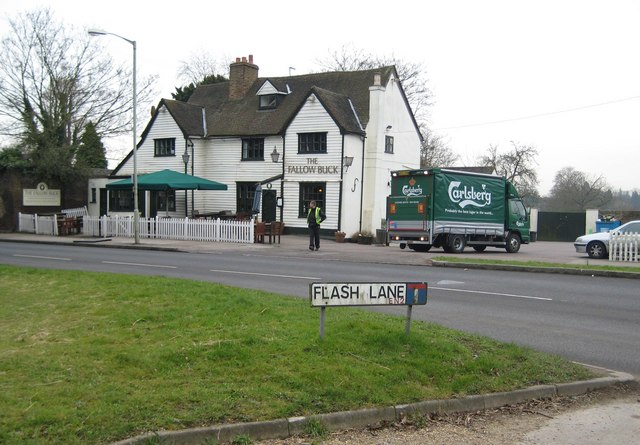
- The Fallow Buck Inn

- Location within London Borough of Enfield Location within Greater London

General information
- Location: Green Street, London, England
- Coordinates: 51°40′22″N 0°05′37″W

Design and construction
- Designations

Listed Building – Grade II
- Official name: Fallow Buck Inn
- Designated: 31 January 1974
- Reference no.: 1188920

The Fallow Buck Inn is a public house in Clay Hill, Enfield, and a grade II listed building with Historic England.
