= The Marquis of Clanricarde =

Pub in Paddington, London

- Type: Public house
- Location: 36 Southwick Street, Paddington, London, W2
- Coordinates: 51°31′1.38″N 0°10′14.3″W

Listed Building – Grade II
- Official name: 32-42 Southwick Street
- Designated: 10-Apr-1975
- Reference no.: 1264535

The Marquis of Clanricarde is a Grade II listed public house at 36 Southwick Street, Paddington, London, W2.

It was built in the early-mid 19th century.
