= Star Tavern, Belgravia =

Pub in Belgravia, London

Star Tavern
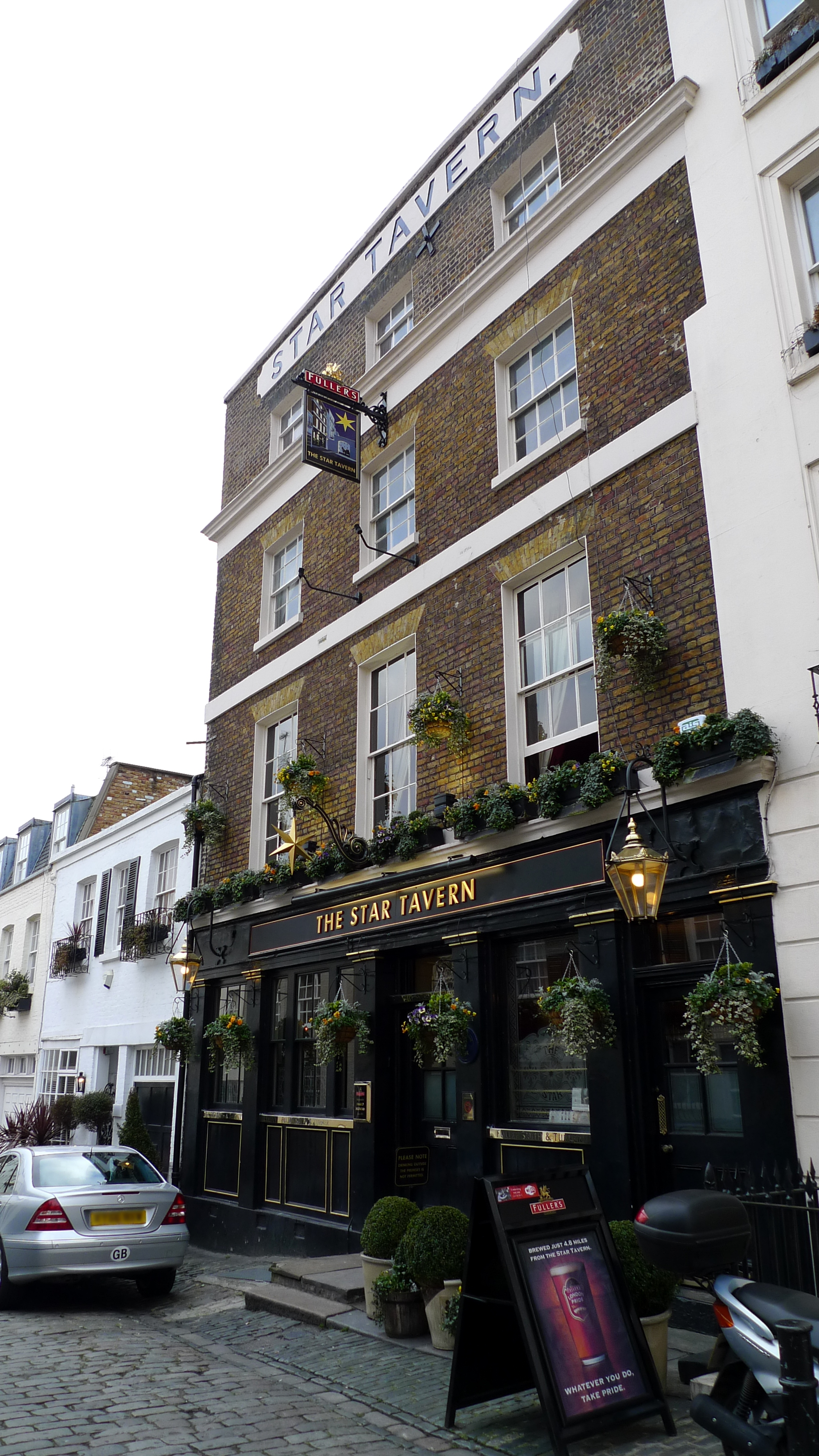
- Star Tavern, Belgravia
- Interactive map of Star Tavern
- Coordinates: 51°29′54.28″N 0°9′21.13″W

Listed Building – Grade II
- Official name: THE STAR TAVERN
- Designated: 1 December 1987
- Reference no.: 1357183

The Star Tavern is a Grade II listed public house at 6 Belgrave Mews West, Belgravia, London SW1.

It was built in the early to mid-19th century.

It was listed as one of Business Insider's best pubs in London.

It has been listed in every edition of CAMRA's Good Beer Guide since 1974, one of only five pubs to achieve this.

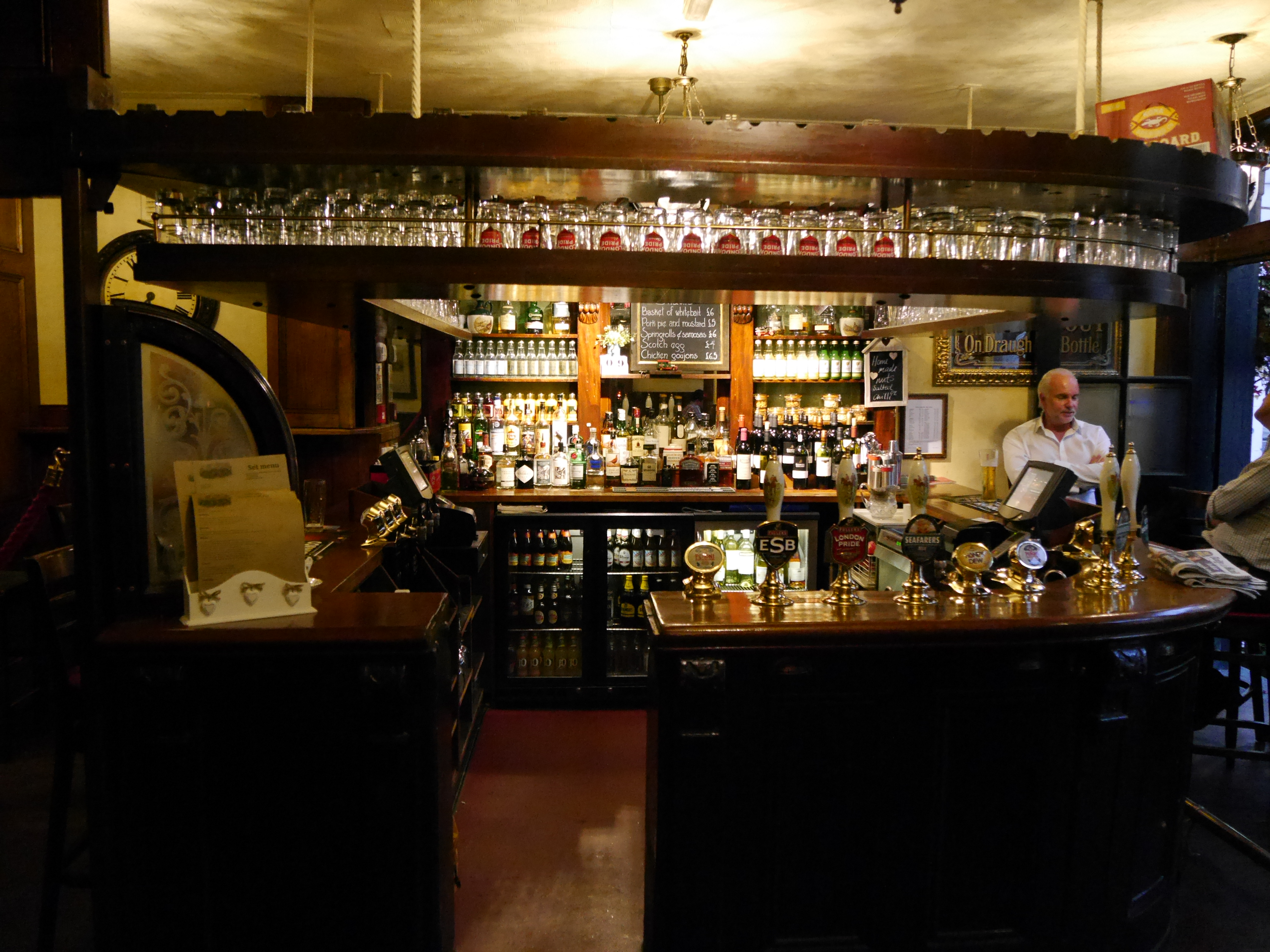
Interior
