= Army and Navy, Stoke Newington =

Pub in Stoke Newington, London

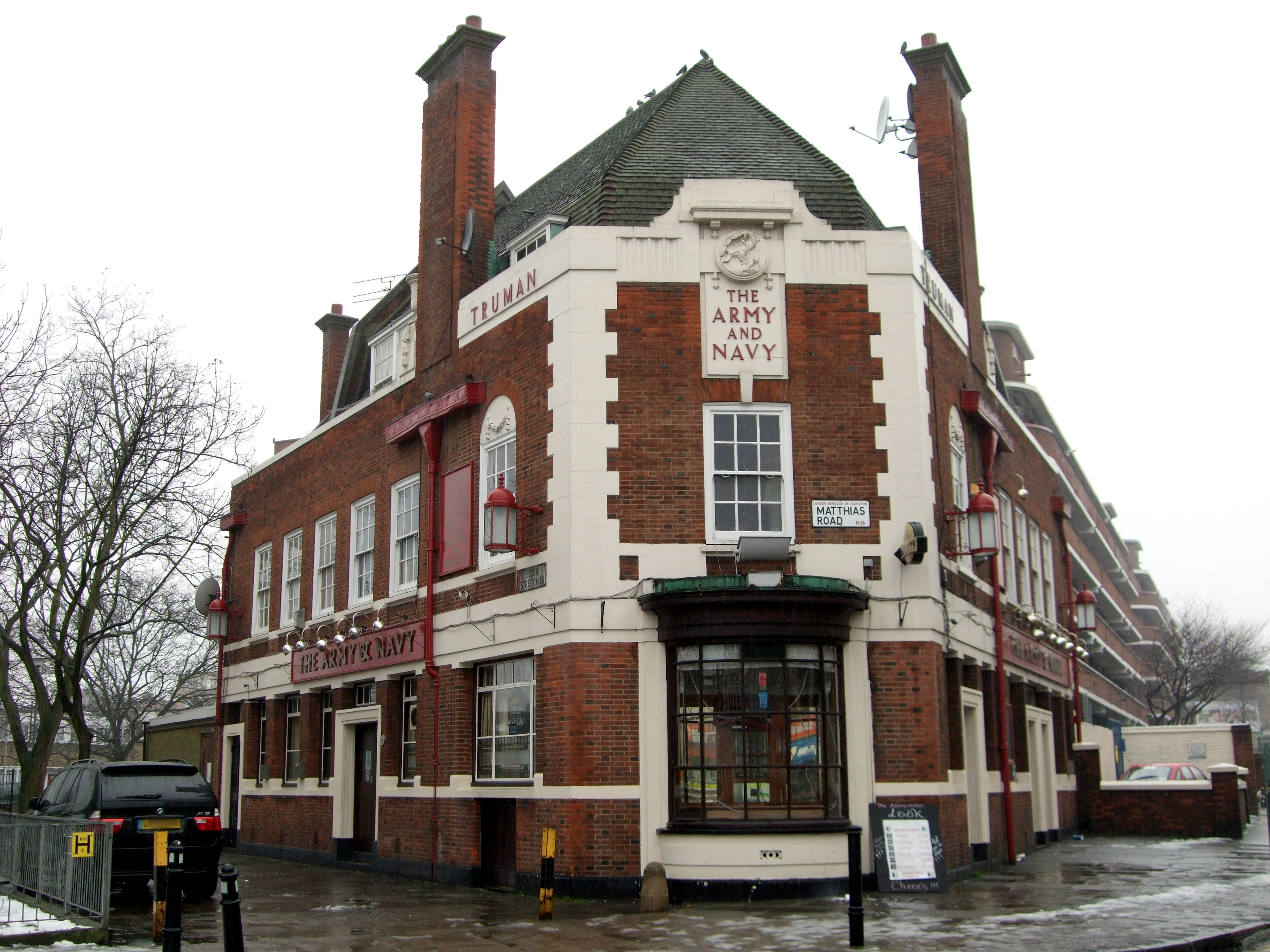
- The Army and Navy

- Location within London Borough of Hackney Location within Greater London

General information
- Location: 1–3 Matthias Road, Stoke Newington, Hackney, London, England
- Coordinates: 51.551886°N 0.079452°W

Design and construction
- Designations

Listed Building – Grade II
- Official name: Army and Navy Public House
- Designated: 24 August 2015
- Reference no.: 1428416

The Army and Navy is a Grade II listed public house at 1–3 Matthias Road, Stoke Newington, Hackney, London N16 8NT.

It was built in 1936 and was Grade II listed in 2015 by Historic England.
