= Goat, Chelsea =

Restaurant and bar in London

Goat in Boots, Chelsea
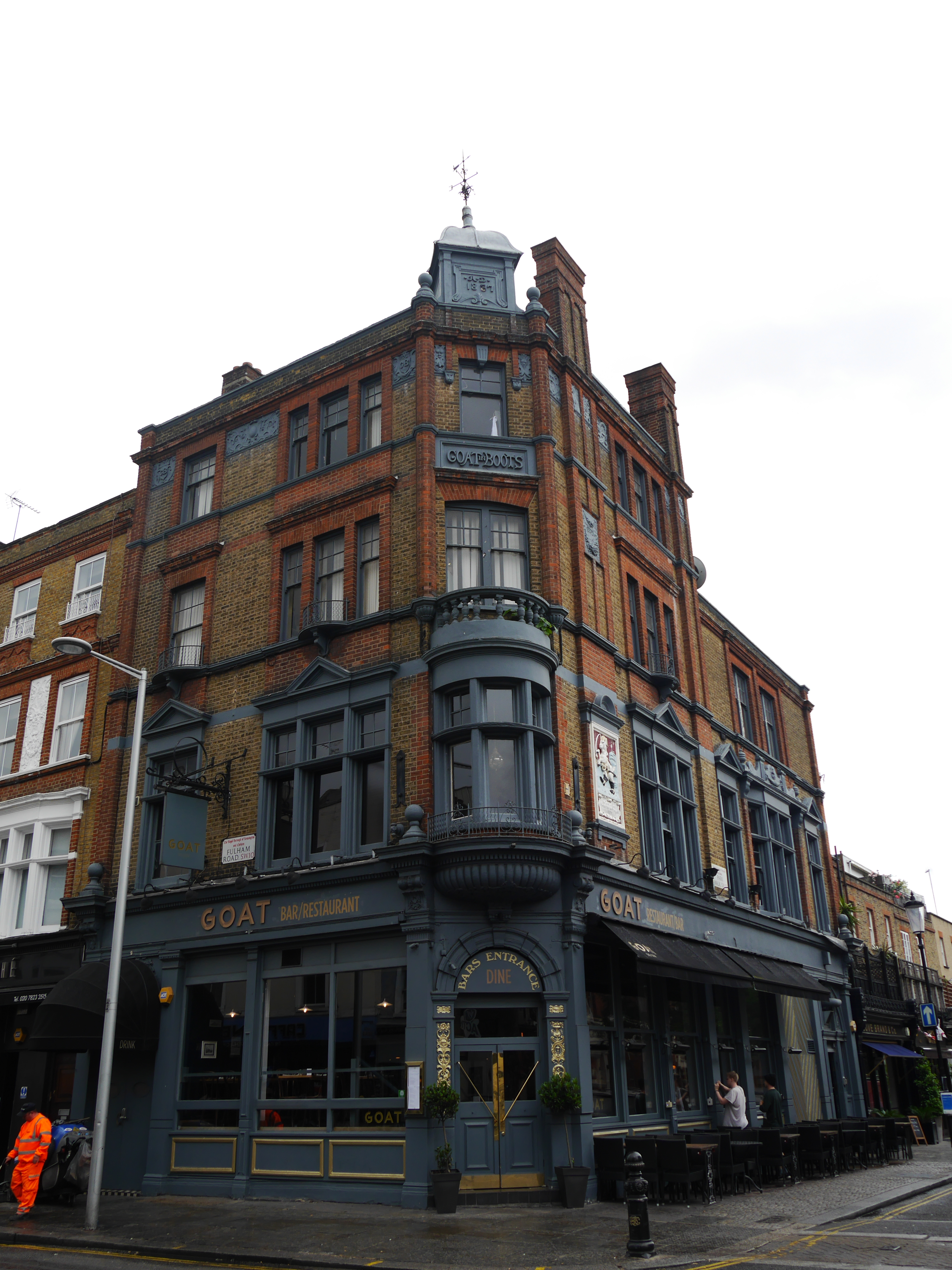
- Goat, 2016

- Location within Royal Borough of Kensington and Chelsea Location within Greater London
- Former names: Goat

General information
- Location: 333 Fulham Road in Chelsea, London, England
- Coordinates: 51.4861°N 0.1802°W

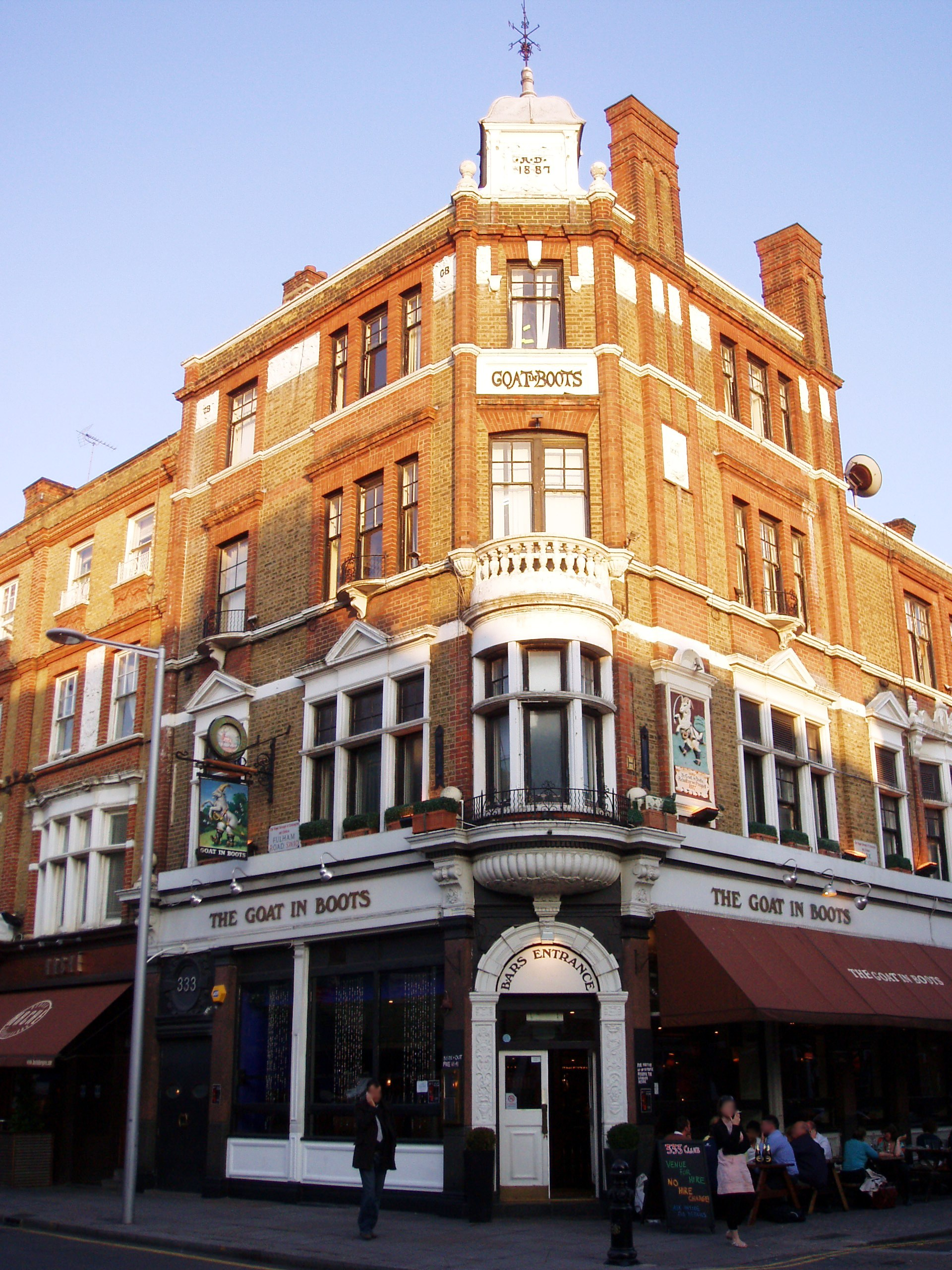
The Goat in Boots, 2008

Goat is an Italian restaurant and cocktail bar at 333 Fulham Road in Chelsea, London, England.

It was originally a pub called the Goat, which in 1725 became the Goat in Boots. In 2013, it was renamed to "Goat".
