= The King's Head and Eight Bells =

Pub in Chelsea, London

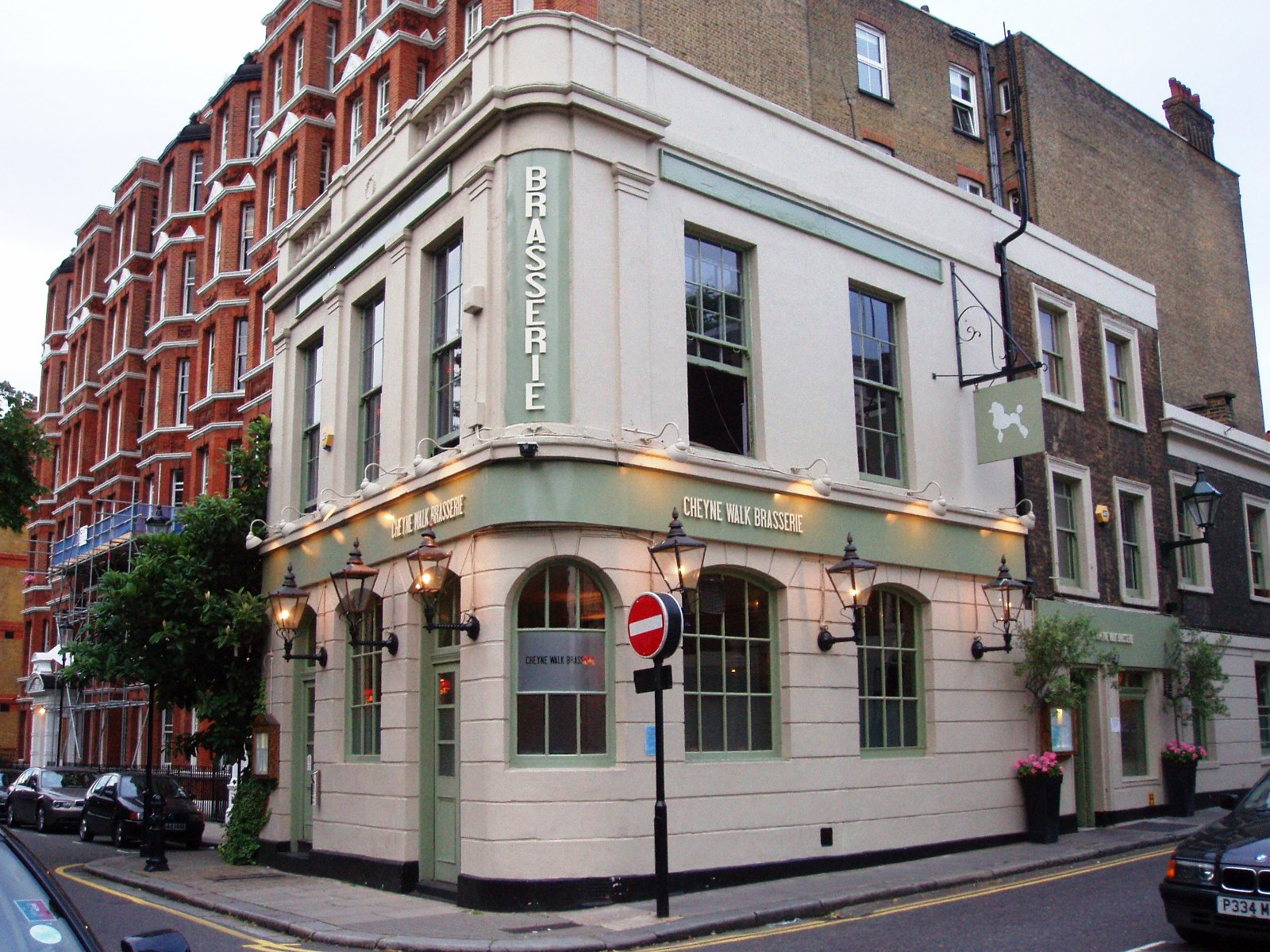
- Now the Cheyne Walk Brasserie

- Location within Royal Borough of Kensington and Chelsea Location within Greater London

General information
- Location: 50 Cheyne Walk, Chelsea, London SW3, London, England
- Coordinates: 51.483527°N 0.16954820°W

Design and construction
- Designations

Listed Building – Grade II
- Official name: The King's Head and Eight Bells Public House
- Designated: 15 April 1969
- Reference no.: 1358127

The King's Head and Eight Bells is a Grade II listed former public house at 50 Cheyne Walk, Chelsea, London SW3, United Kingdom.

It was built in the early 19th century.

It is now a restaurant, the Cheyne Walk Brasserie.

The King's Head and Eight Bells was Dylan Thomas's favourite pub in the early 1940s during the second world war.
