= The White Bear, Clerkenwell =

Pub in Clerkenwell, London

Coordinates: 51°31′16″N 0°06′06″W

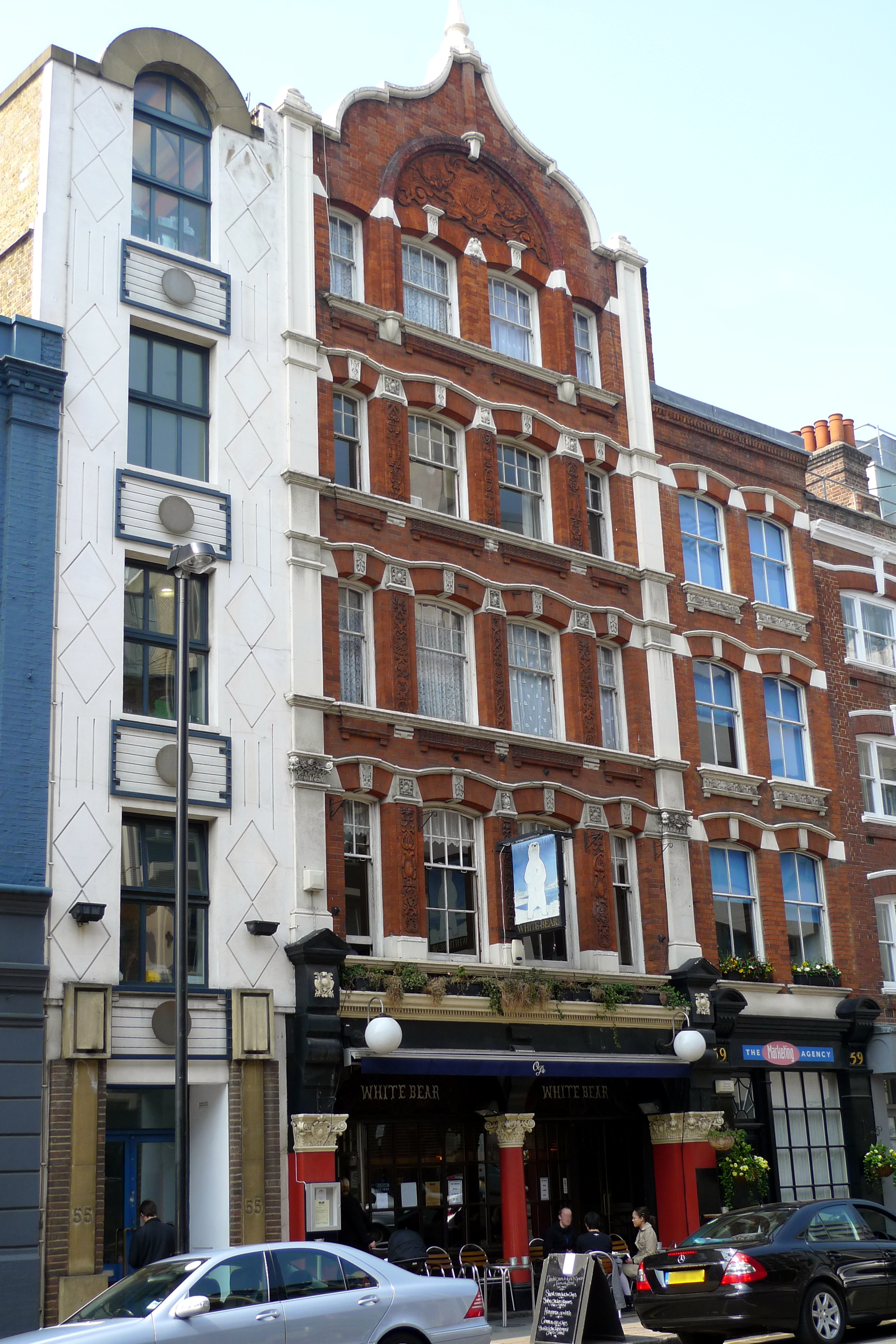
The White Bear

The White Bear is a Grade II listed public house at 57 St John Street, Clerkenwell, London.

It was built in 1899.
