= Commercial Tavern =

Pub in Spitalfields, London

Coordinates: 51.521609°N 0.0756954°W

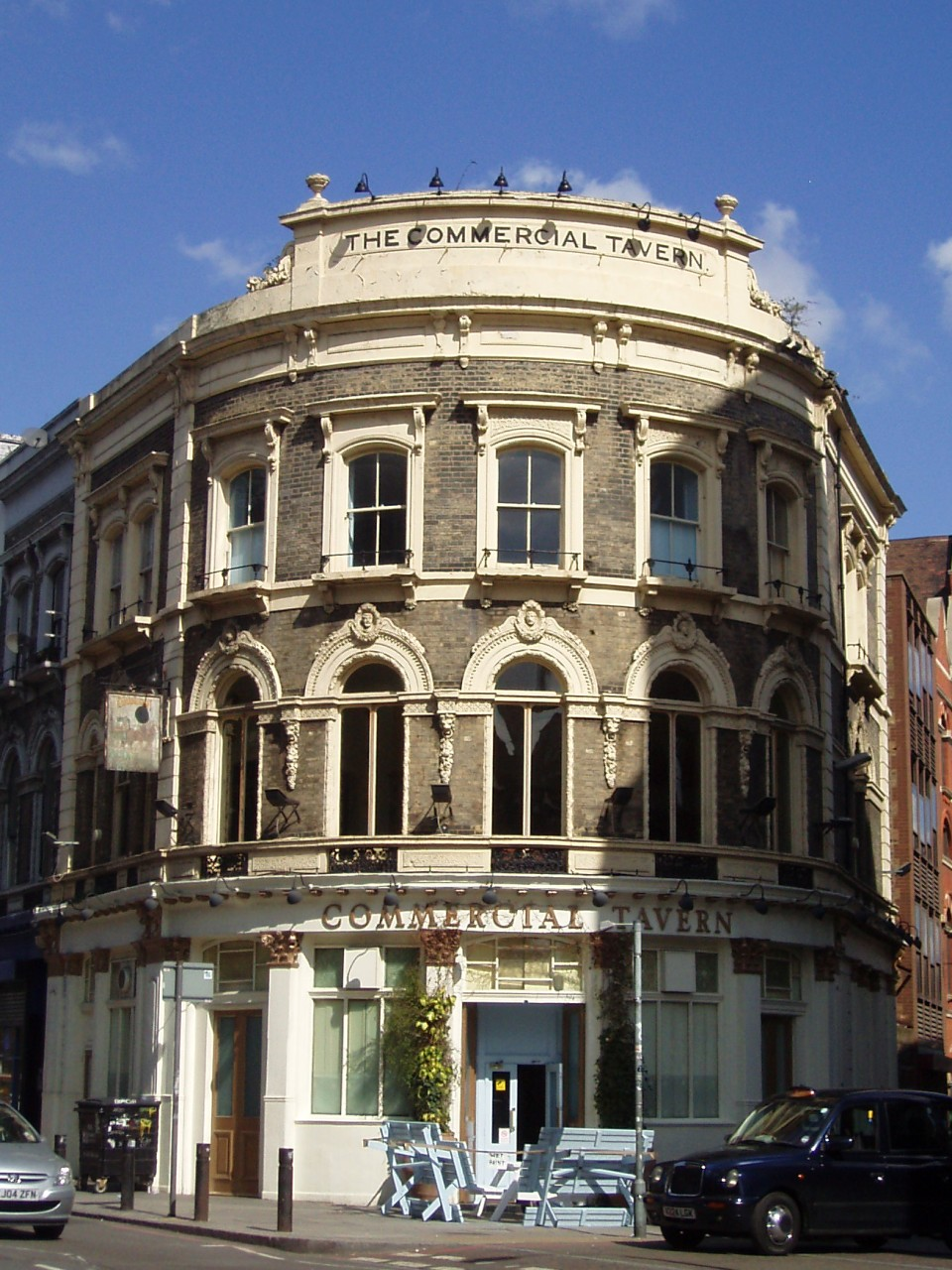
The Commercial Tavern, Spitalfields, London

The Commercial Tavern is a pub at 142 Commercial Street, Spitalfields, in the London Borough of Tower Hamlets.

It is a Grade II listed round-ended building of white brick with painted stucco dressings, erected in 1865 by Abraham Keymer, publican of the Norfolk Arms in nearby Bethnal Green.
