= The Perseverance =

Pub in Bloomsbury, London

Coordinates: 51.522211°N 0.118900°W

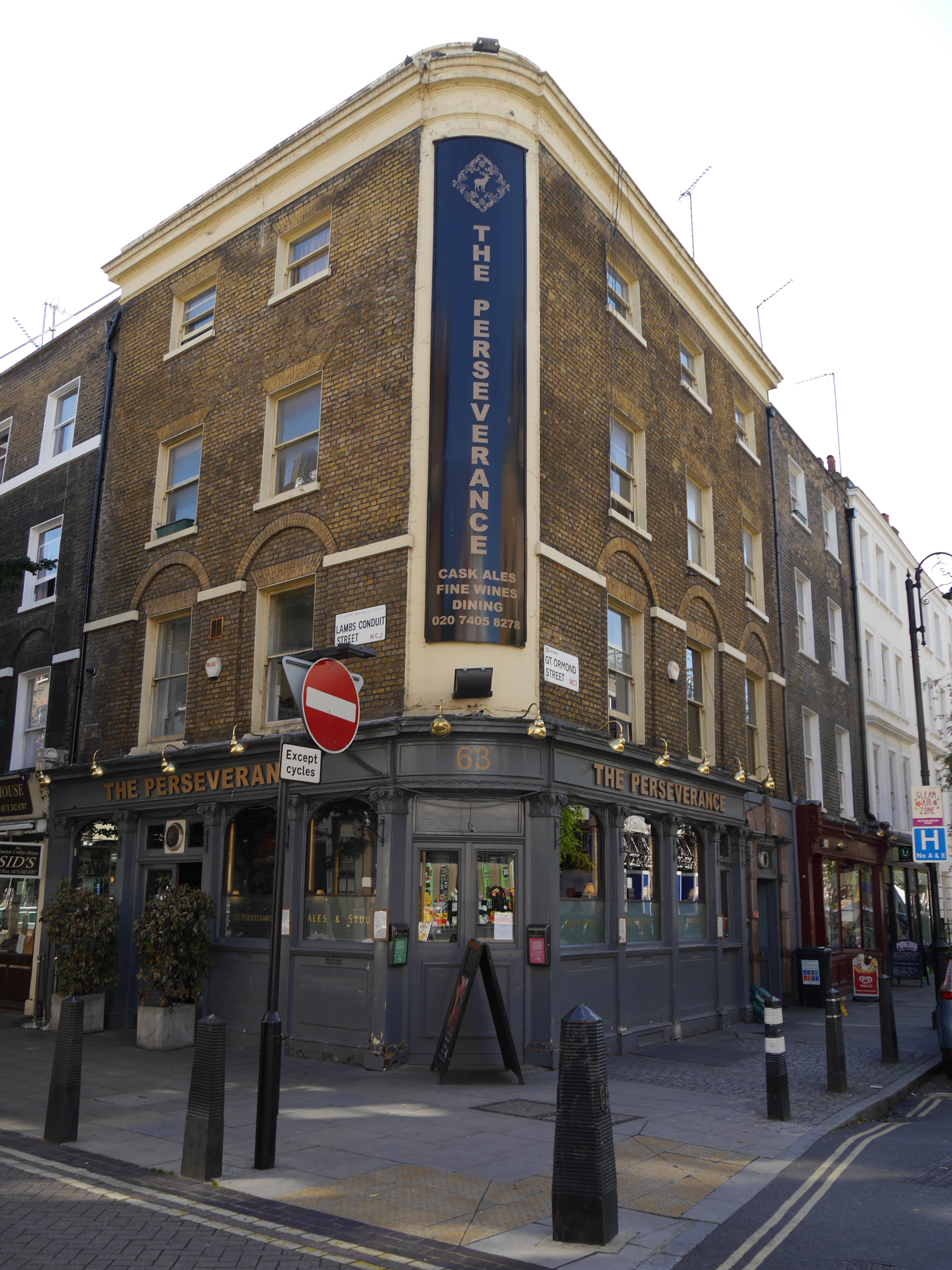
The Perseverance, 2016

The Perseverance is a pub at 63 Lamb's Conduit Street, Bloomsbury, London WC1, on the corner with Great Ormond Street.

It is a Grade II listed building, built in the early 18th century, and refronted in the early 19th century.

It was The Sun until the 1990s, and after several name changes, became The Perseverance in 2006.
