= The Queen Adelaide =

Pub in Shepherd's Bush, London

Coordinates: 51.506608°N 0.237502°W

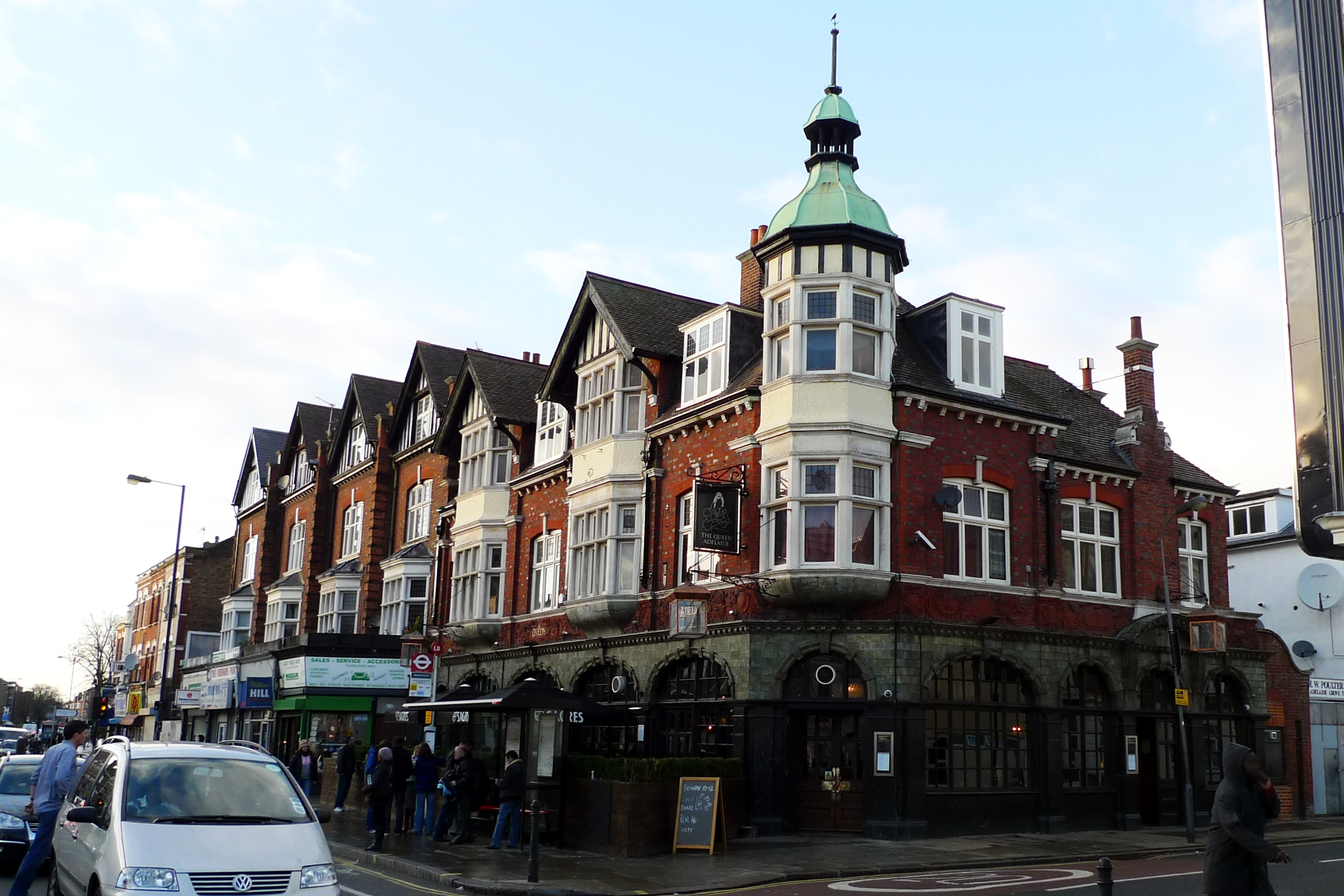
The Queen Adelaide, Shepherd's Bush, London W12

The Queen Adelaide is a pub at 412 Uxbridge Road, Shepherd's Bush, London W12. It is a Greene King property.

It is a Grade II listed building, built in about 1900.
