= Two Brewers, Covent Garden =

Pub in Covent Garden, London

Coordinates: 51.51336°N 0.12722°W

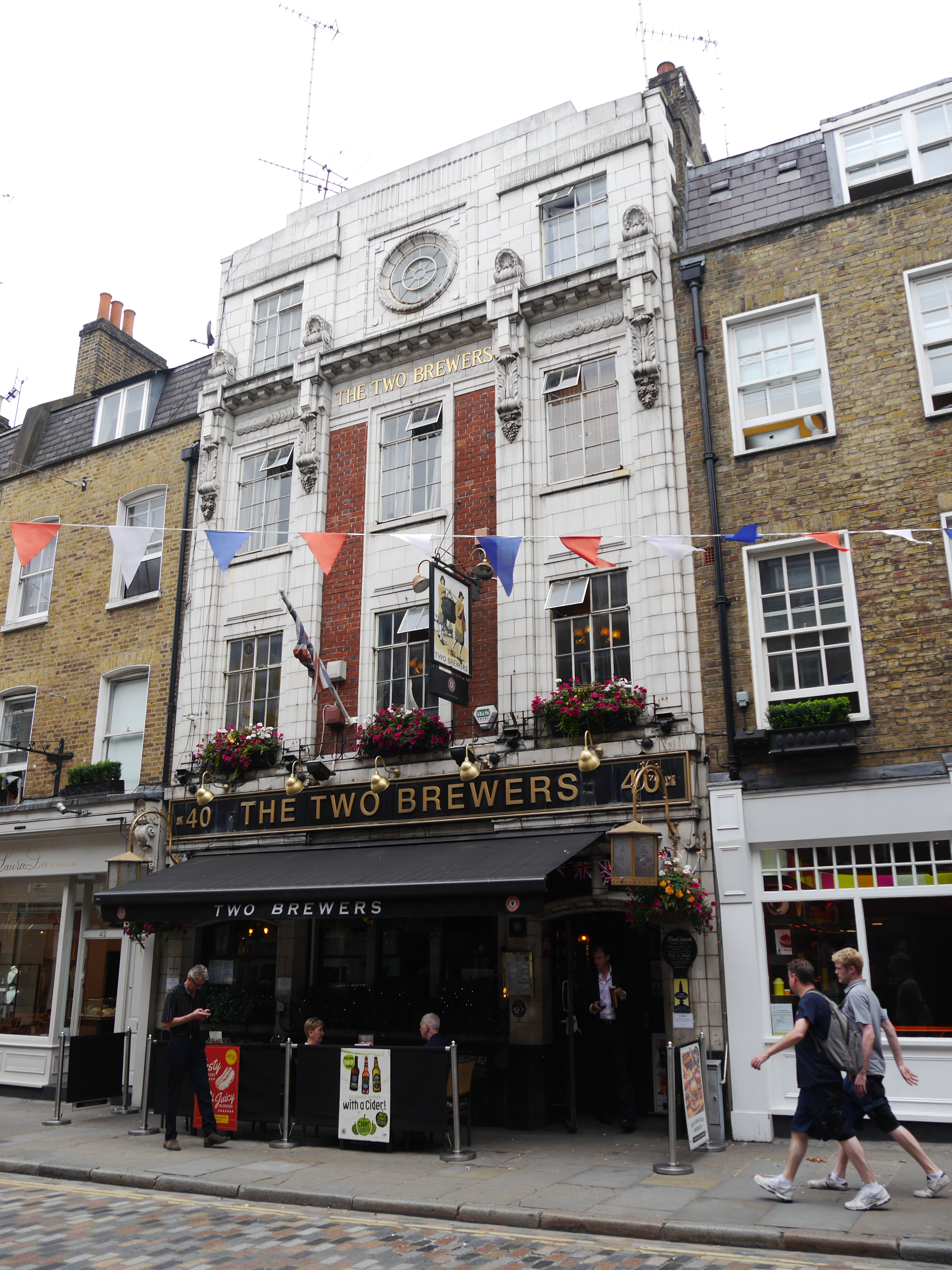
Two Brewers (exterior, 2016)

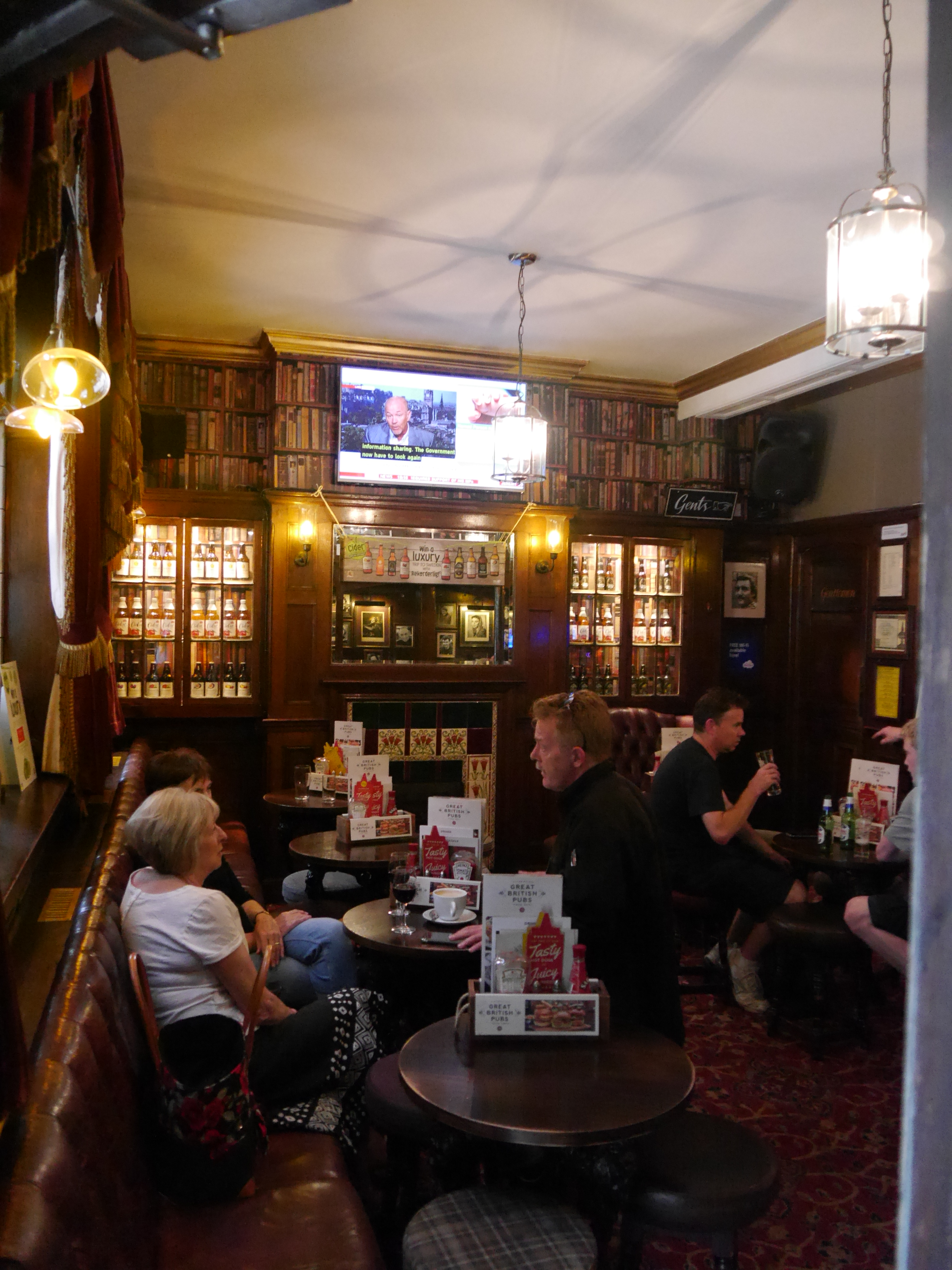
Two Brewers (interior, 2016)

The Two Brewers is a pub in Covent Garden, London, at 40 Monmouth Street.

Prior to 1835, the pub was known as the Sheep's Head Tavern and featured open fires. In 1835, William Spicer, formerly the proprietor of the Tower at Tower street in the Seven Dials became the pub keeper. The 1842 will of "William Filler, Licensed Victualler of Two Brewers Public House, Little Saint Andrews Street, Seven Dials, Middlesex" is held in The National Archives, in Kew, London.

Some time before 1940, the address was changed from 6 Little St Andrew Street to 40 Monmouth Street.

It is a "theatrical pub", popular with actors and film school students. The pub is part of the Taylor Walker pub chain.

In the late 1990s it was an establishment used by people working in hairdressing salons, clothing shops, and media companies in the surrounding neighbourhood. Theatre goers, film students, and local workers formed the customer base.
