= Rose and Crown, Isleworth =

Pub in Isleworth, London

Coordinates: 51°28′37″N 0°19′41″W

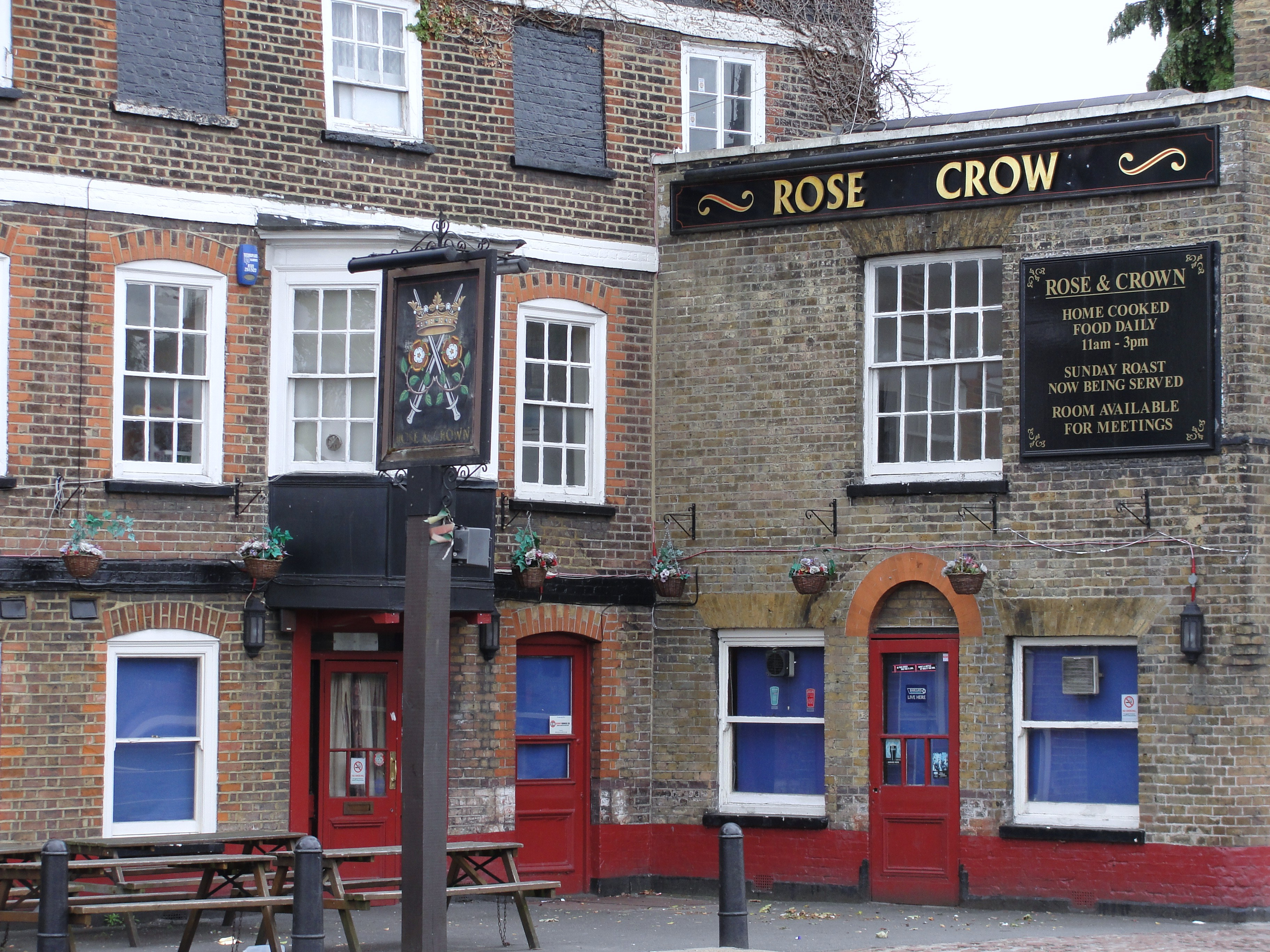
Rose and Crown

The Rose and Crown is a Grade II listed public house at London Road, Isleworth, London.

It was built in the 18th century, with 19th-century additions.
