= The Crown and Horseshoes =

Pub in Enfield, London

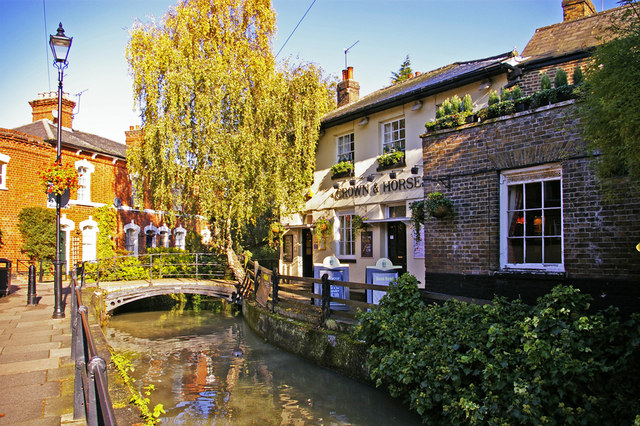
- The Crown and Horseshoes

- Location within London Borough of Enfield Location within Greater London

General information
- Location: Horseshoe Lane, Enfield, London, England
- Coordinates: 51.6559°N 0.0869°W

Design and construction
- Designations

Listed Building – Grade II
- Official name: Crown and Horseshoes Public House
- Designated: 31 January 1974
- Reference no.: 1079538

The Crown and Horseshoes is a grade II listed public house in Horseshoe Lane, Enfield.
