= Lord Nelson, Bermondsey =

Pub in Bermondsey, London

Coordinates: 51°29′12″N 0°04′27″W

The Lord Nelson
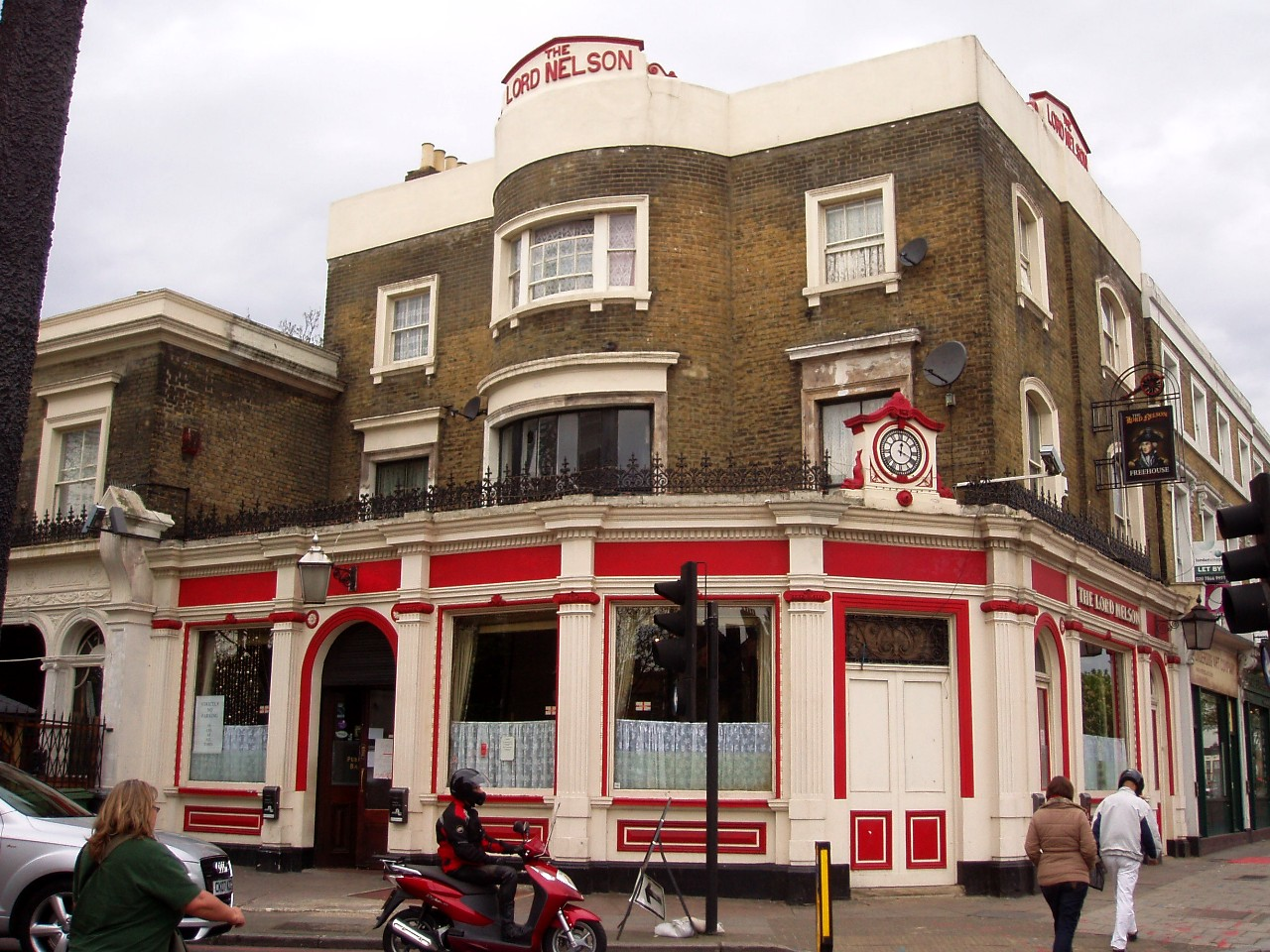
- The front of the pub in 2011.
- Interactive map of the The Lord Nelson area

General information
- Location: 386 Old Kent Road, Southwark, London, SE1

Design and construction
- Designations

Listed Building – Grade II
- Designated: 27 Sep 1972
- Reference no.: 1385992

The Lord Nelson is a Grade II listed public house at 386 Old Kent Road, Bermondsey, London.

It is on the Campaign for Real Ale's National Inventory of Historic Pub Interiors.

It was built in the early 19th century.

It is now one of only two pubs left on the Old Kent Road, which at one point had 39.
