= Black Horse, Stepney =

Pub in Stepney, London

Coordinates: 51.521052°N 0.0490373°W

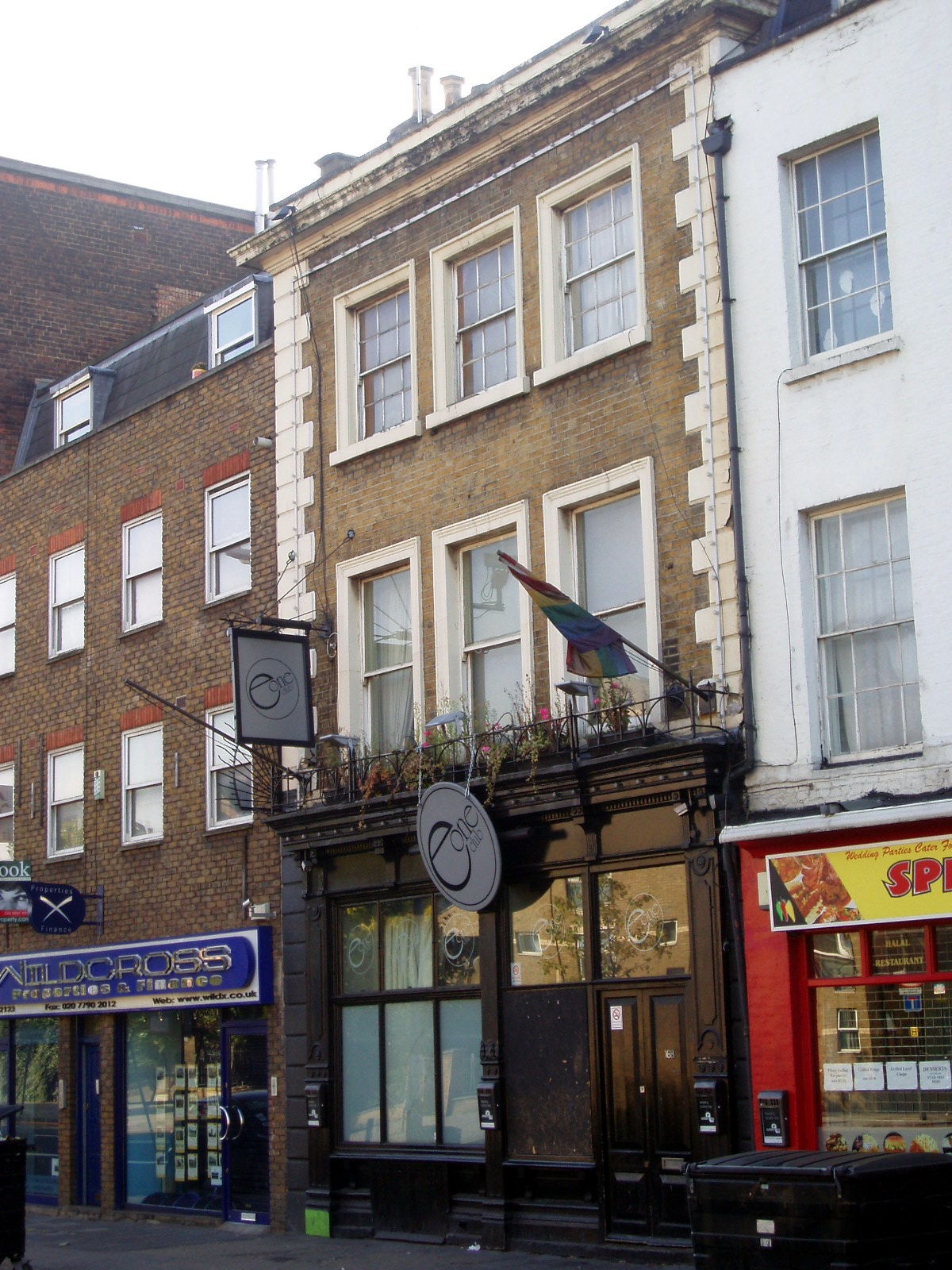
E One Club, formerly the Black Horse

The Black Horse was formerly a pub at 168 Mile End Road, Stepney, London E1.

It is a Grade II listed building, built in the early-mid 19th century.
