= The Fox, Twickenham =

Pub in Twickenham, London

Coordinates: 51.446655°N 0.327092°W

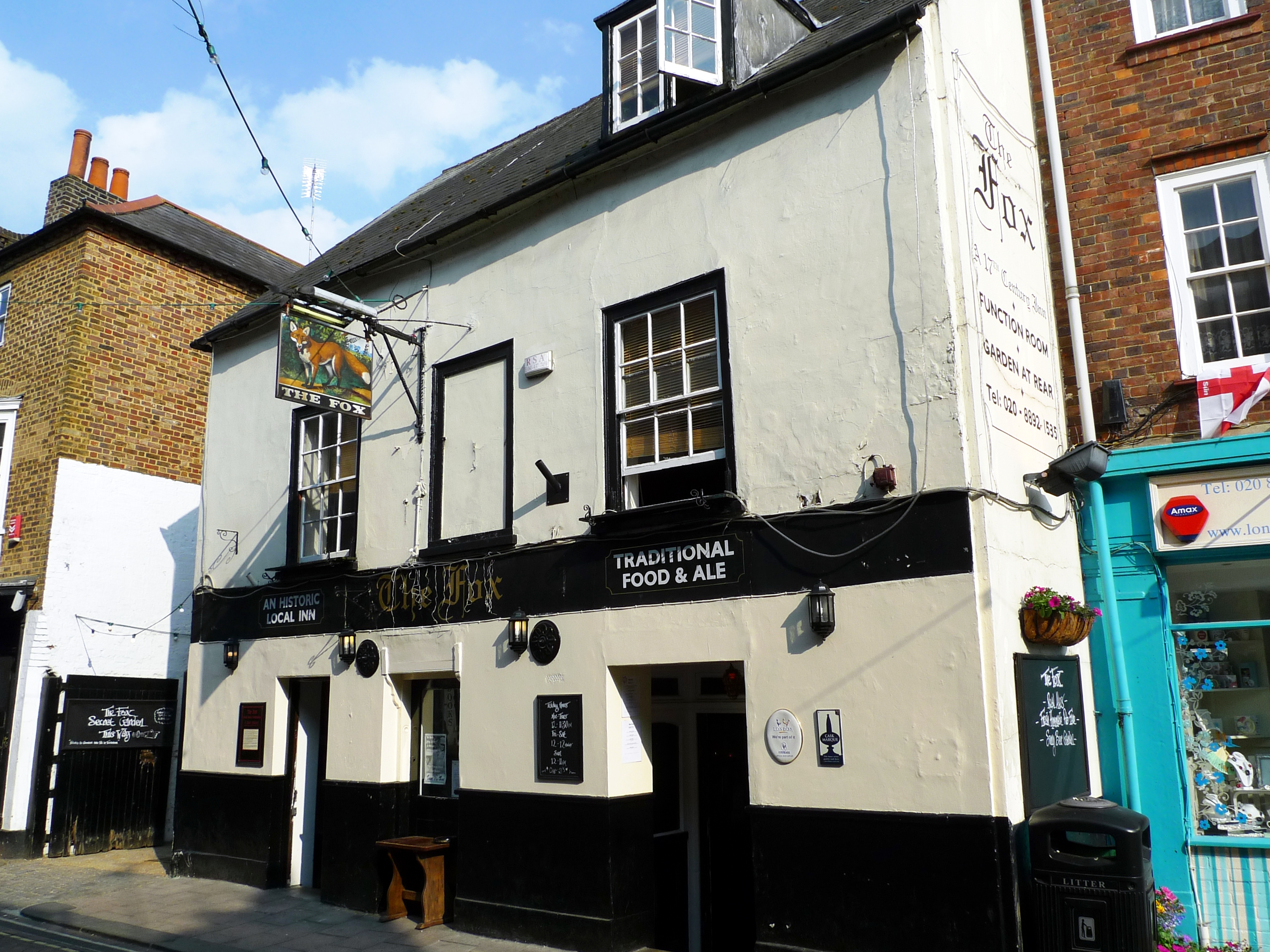
The Fox, Twickenham

The Fox is a pub at 39 Church Street, Twickenham, in the London Borough of Richmond upon Thames. It is a Grade II listed building, dating back to the 18th century.
