= The White Horse, Enfield =

Pub in Enfield, London

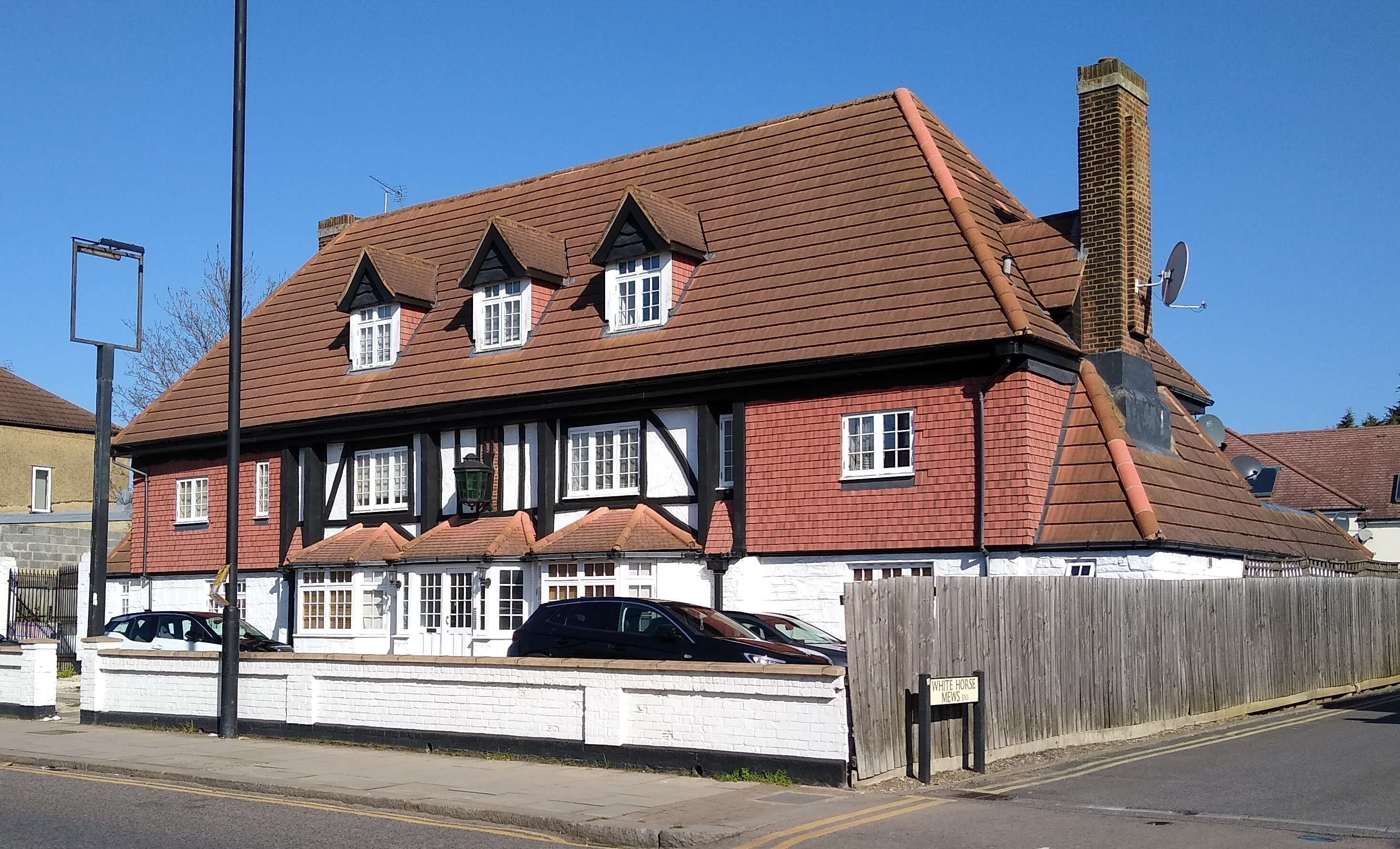

- Location within London Borough of Enfield Location within Greater London

General information
- Location: Green Street, London, England
- Coordinates: 51.6566°N 0.0419°W

Design and construction
- Designations

Listed Building – Grade II
- Official name: The White Horse Public House
- Designated: 31 January 1974
- Reference no.: 1079538

The White Horse is a grade II listed public house in Green Street, Brimsdown, Enfield.
