= The Shuckburgh Arms, Chelsea =

Former pub in Chelsea, London

Coordinates: 51.4939°N 0.1647°W

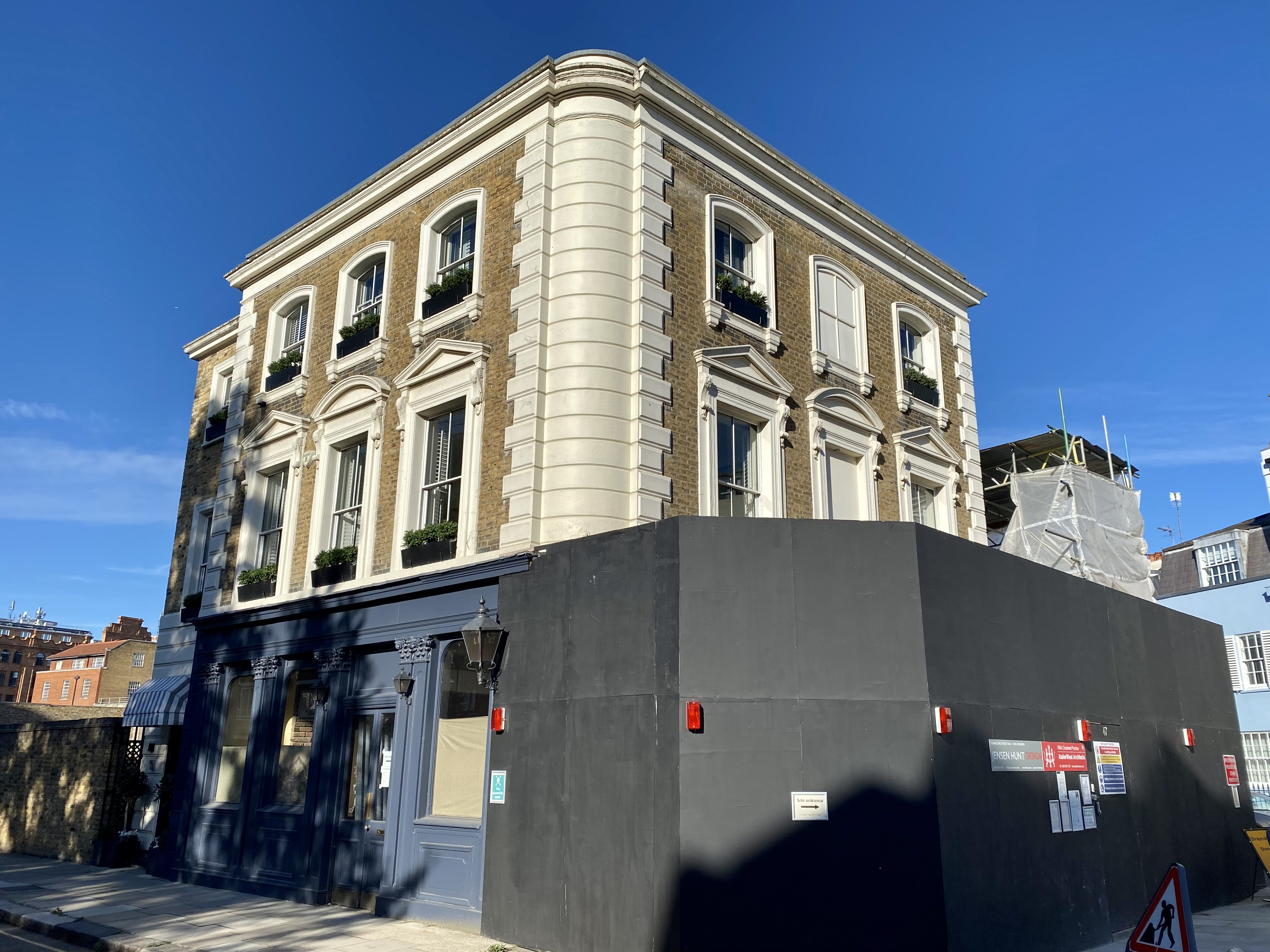
The former Shuckburgh Arms in 2024.

The Shuckburgh Arms is a Grade II listed public house on the corner of Denyer Street and Milner Street, Chelsea, London.

It was built in the mid-19th century, but the architect is not known. English Heritage have noted its "unspoilt condition".

The Shuckburgh Arms closed after several drug raids and has since become a branch of the "Baker & Spice" delicatessen chain.
