= Laurie Arms =

Pub in Hammersmith, London, England

Coordinates: 51.4941°N 0.2243°W

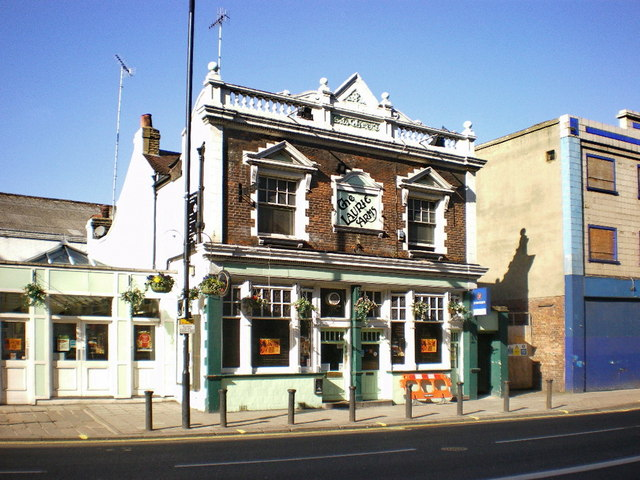
The Laurie Arms, 2009

The Laurie Arms is a pub at 238 Shepherd's Bush Road, Hammersmith, London. It was next door to the Hammersmith Palais, a long running dance hall and music venue from 1919, which hosted The Beatles, The Rolling Stones, The Who, David Bowie and the Sex Pistols, but was demolished in 2013.

It has been a pub since at least 1881. It reopened in February 2015 as a branch of the Draft House pub chain, with the interior featuring original gig posters and photos from the Hammersmith Palais. The refurbishment has retained the ten foot tall stained-glass windows at the front.

Notable visitors have included The Pogues and Elvis Costello.
