= The Shipwrights Arms =

Pub in Southwark, London

Coordinates: 51°30′16″N 0°05′01″W

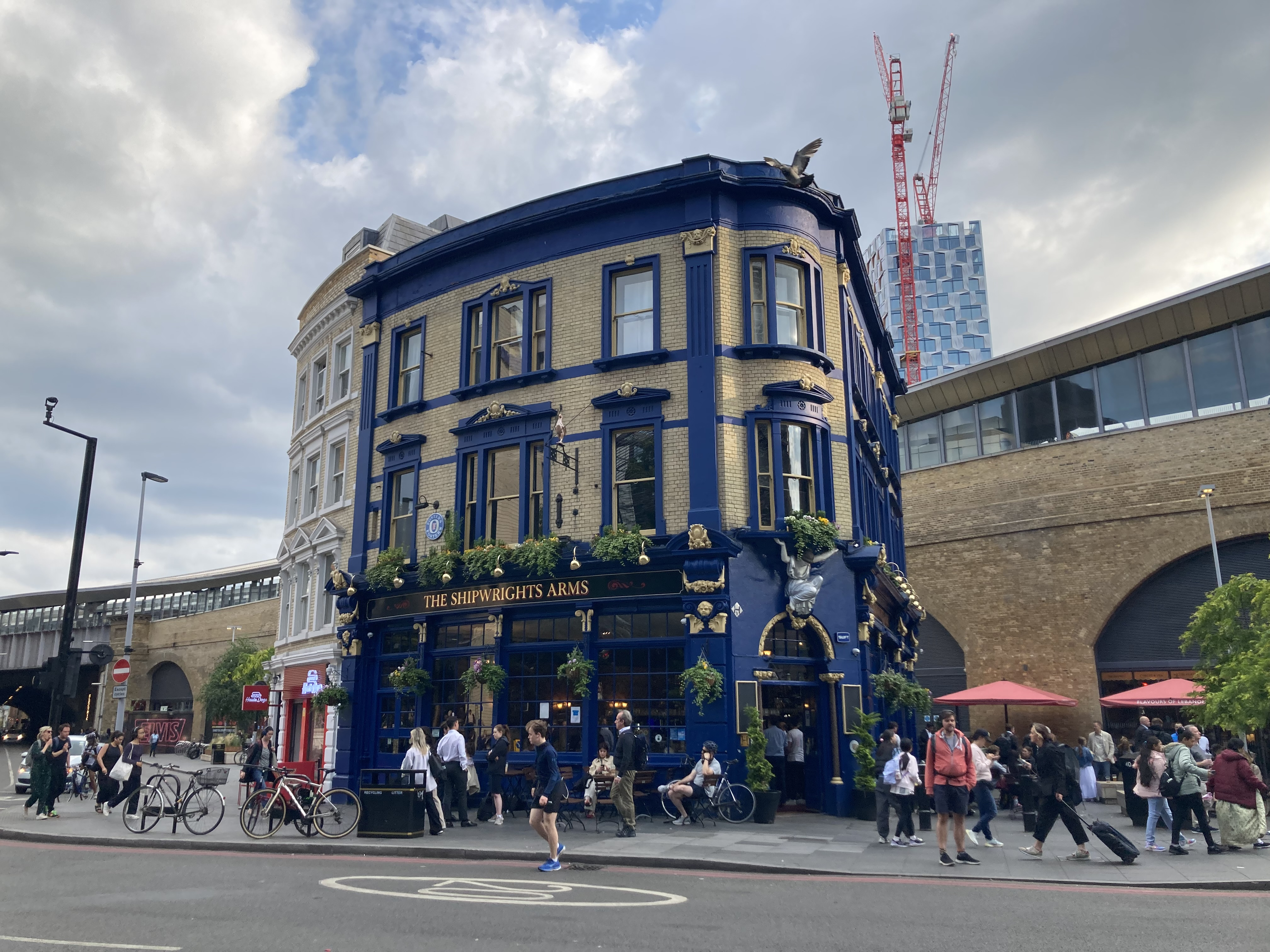
The Shipwrights Arms in 2024

The Shipwrights Arms is a Grade II listed public house at 88 Tooley Street, London Bridge, London.

It was built in the mid-late 19th century.
