= Great Northern Railway Tavern =

Pub in Hornsey, London

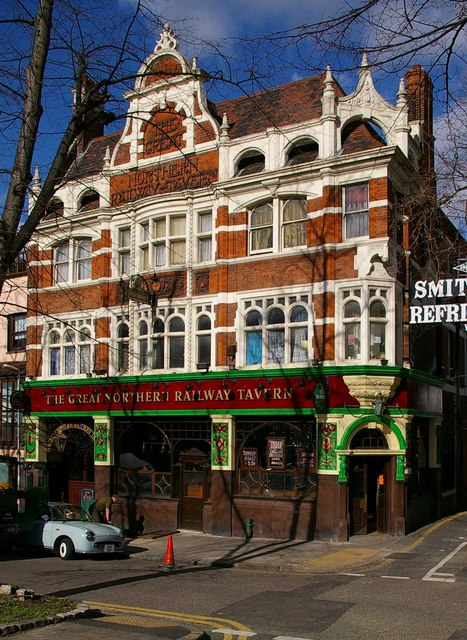
- Great Northern Railway

- Location within London Borough of Haringey Location within Greater London

General information
- Location: High Street, Hornsey, London, England
- Coordinates: 51°35′17″N 0°06′59″W

Design and construction
- Designations

Listed Building – Grade II
- Official name: Great Northern Railway Tavern
- Designated: 10 May 1974
- Reference no.: 1079213

Website
- https://www.thegreatnorthernrailway.co.uk/

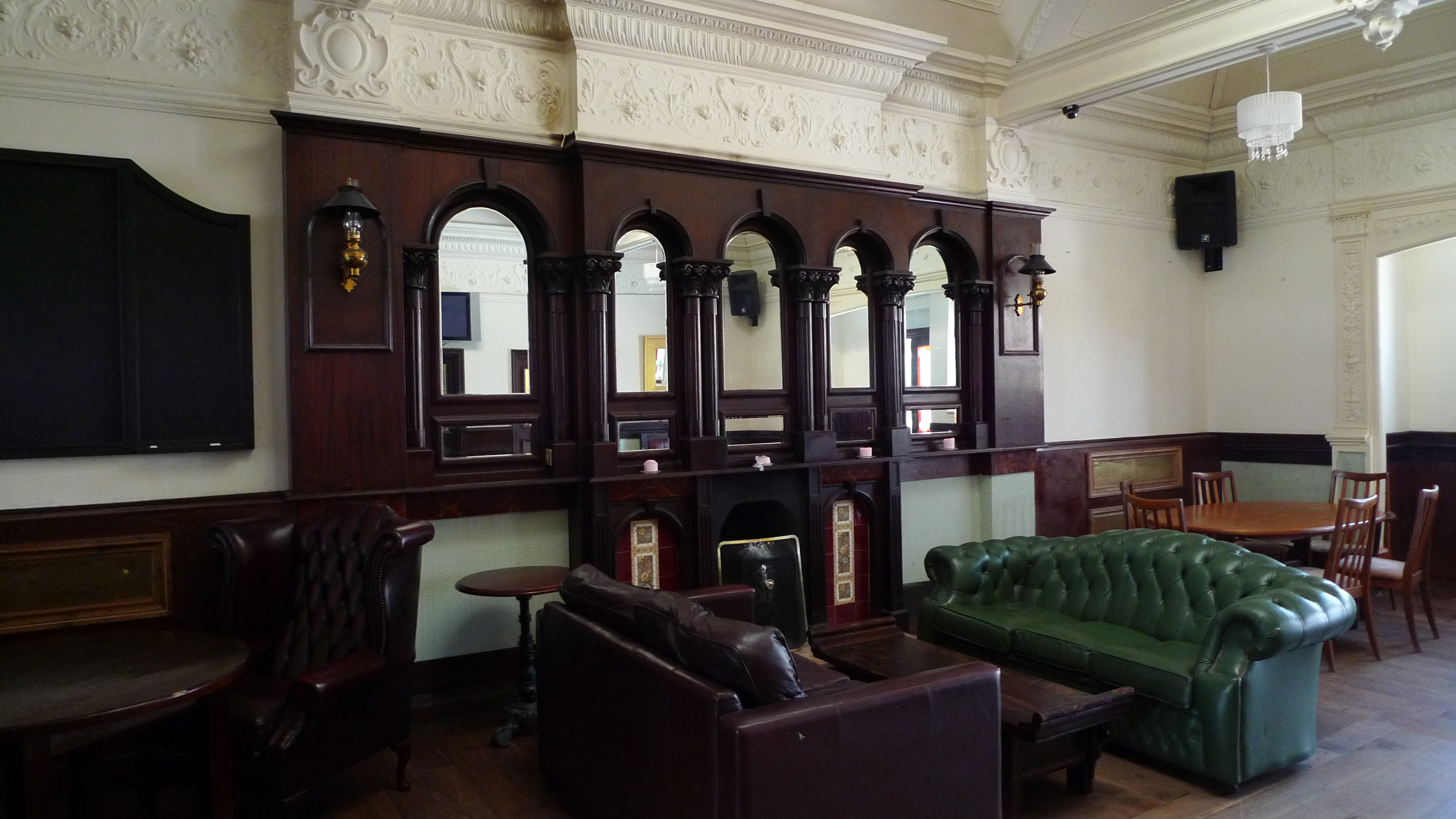
Great Northern Railway interior

The Great Northern Railway Tavern is a Grade II listed public house at High Street, Hornsey, London.

It was built in about 1900.

Since 2017 the pub has been operated by Fuller's Brewery.
