= The Tea Clipper =

Former pub in Knightsbridge, London

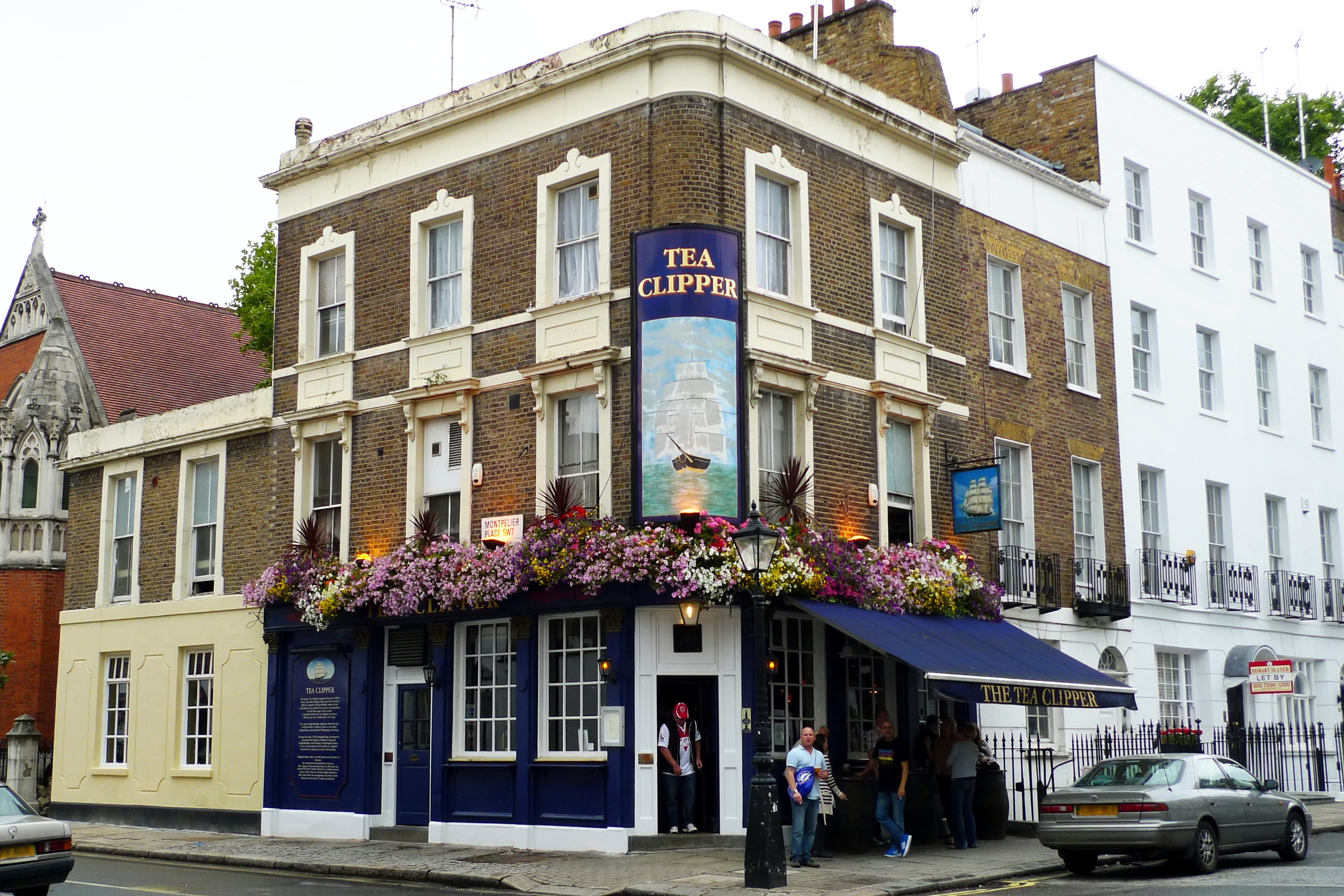
- The Tea Clipper
- Type: Public house
- Location: 19 Montpelier Street, Knightsbridge, London, SW7
- Coordinates: 51°29′58.56″N 0°9′58.56″W

Listed Building – Grade II
- Official name: Former Tea Clipper Public House
- Designated: 11-May-1971
- Reference no.: 1223459

The Tea Clipper was a Grade II listed public house at 19 Montpelier Street, Knightsbridge, London, SW7.

It was formerly called The Talbot and was built in the early/mid-19th century.

The pub closed in 2014. In May 2012 the owner, Aldenberg Investments Ltd, had planning permission to turn it into a house refused by the City of Westminster.
