= Queen's Head, Pinner =

Pub in Pinner, London

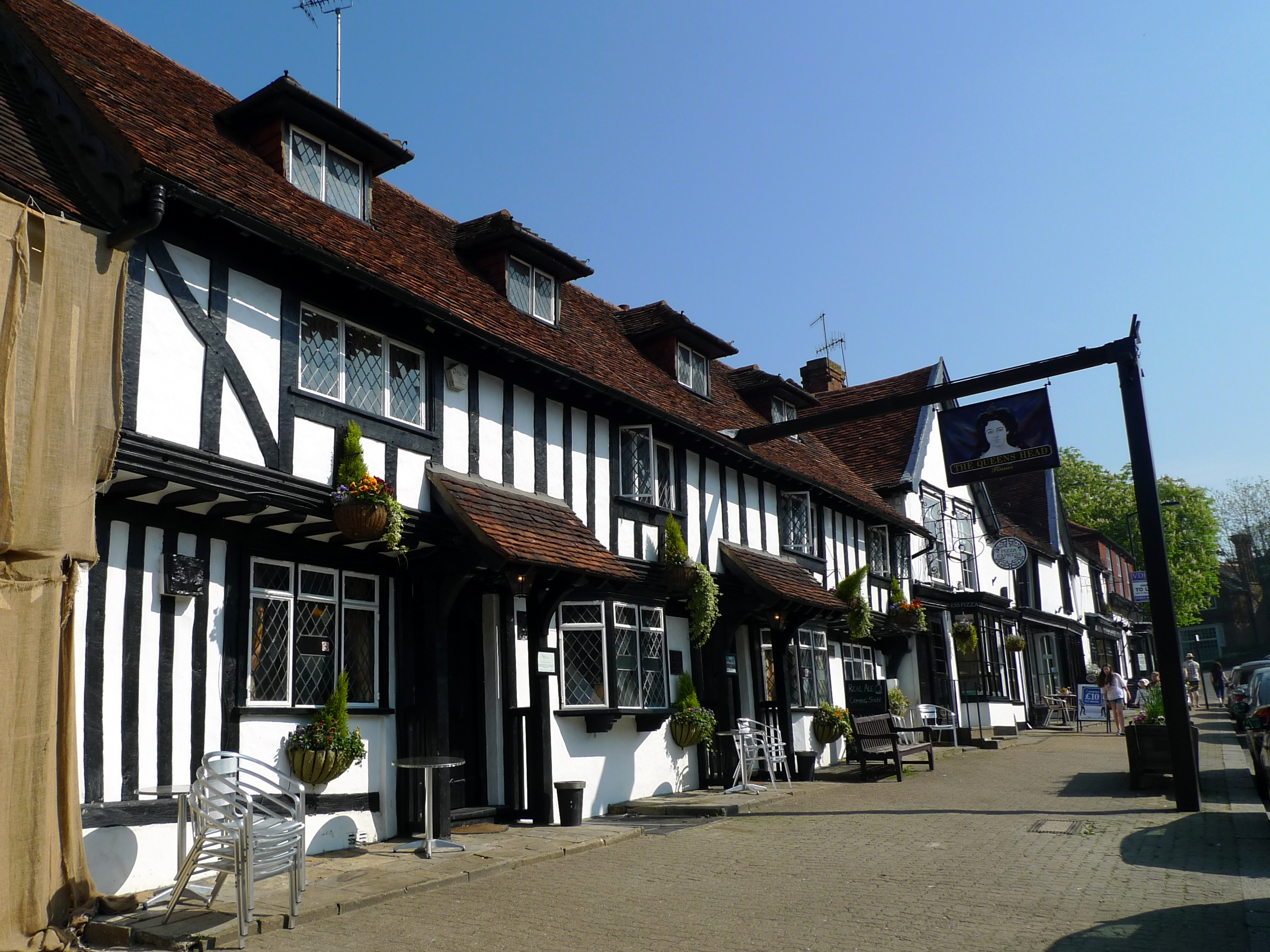
- The Queen's Head, 2011

- Location within London Borough of Harrow Location within Greater London

General information
- Location: 31 High Street, Pinner, Harrow, London, England
- Coordinates: 51.594368°N 0.380705°W

Design and construction
- Designations

Listed Building – Grade II
- Official name: Queen's Head Public House
- Designated: 9 July 1968
- Reference no.: 1079700

The Queens Head is a public house, dating back to the 16th century, at 31 High Street, Pinner, in the London Borough of Harrow, England.

The timber-framed building was Grade II listed in 1968 by Historic England.
