= Rutland Arms, Hammersmith =

Pub in London, opened 1849

Coordinates: 51.489845°N 0.231422°W

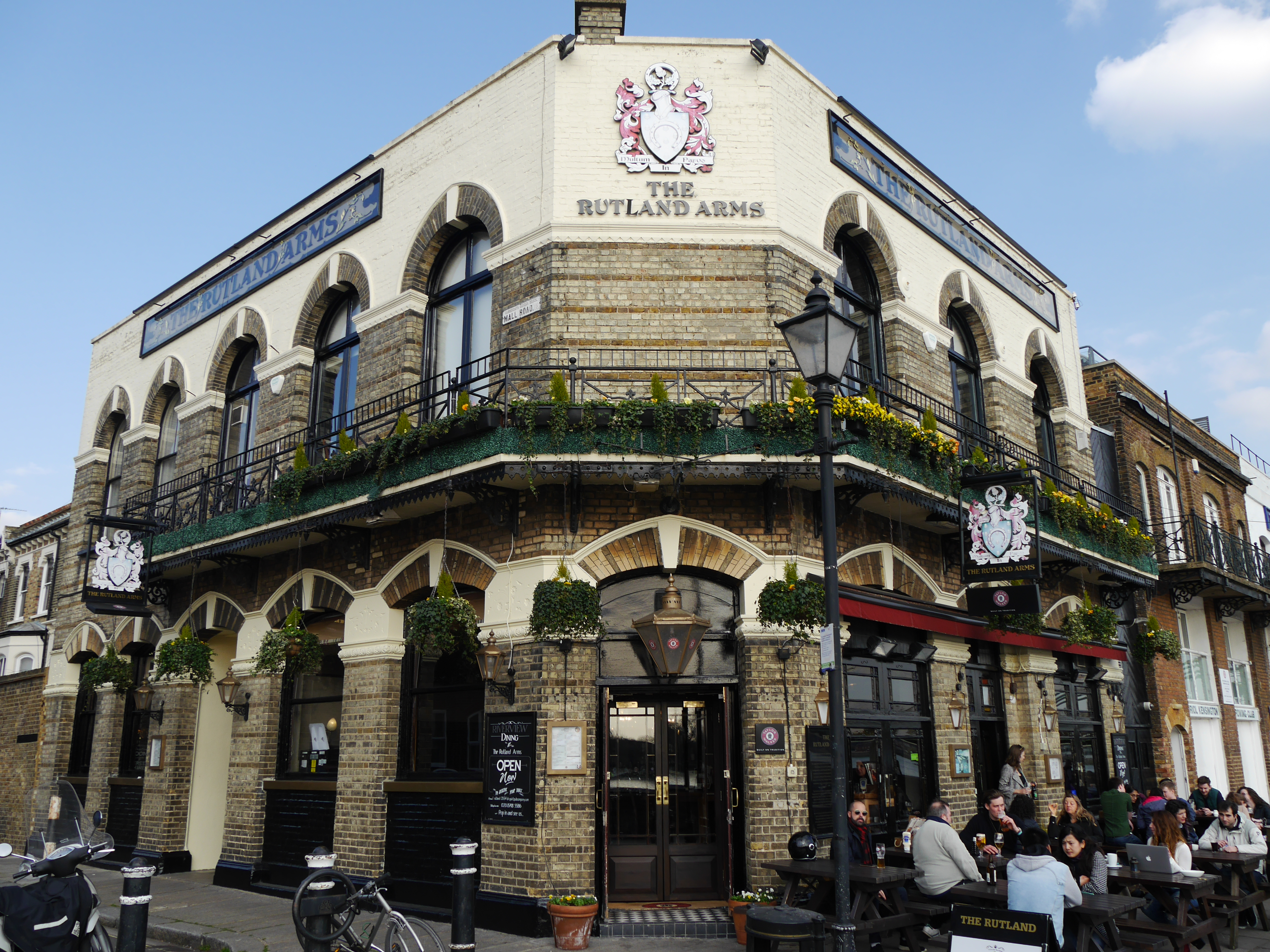
Rutland Arms, Hammersmith

The Rutland Arms is a public house at 15 Lower Mall, Hammersmith, London, England. It was also called the Rutland Hotel.

The Rutland Arms opened around 1849 and was rebuilt in the 1870s. During the Blitz, the pub lost its top floor and balcony.
