= Anglesea Arms, South Kensington =

Pub in south Kensington, London

Anglesea Arms
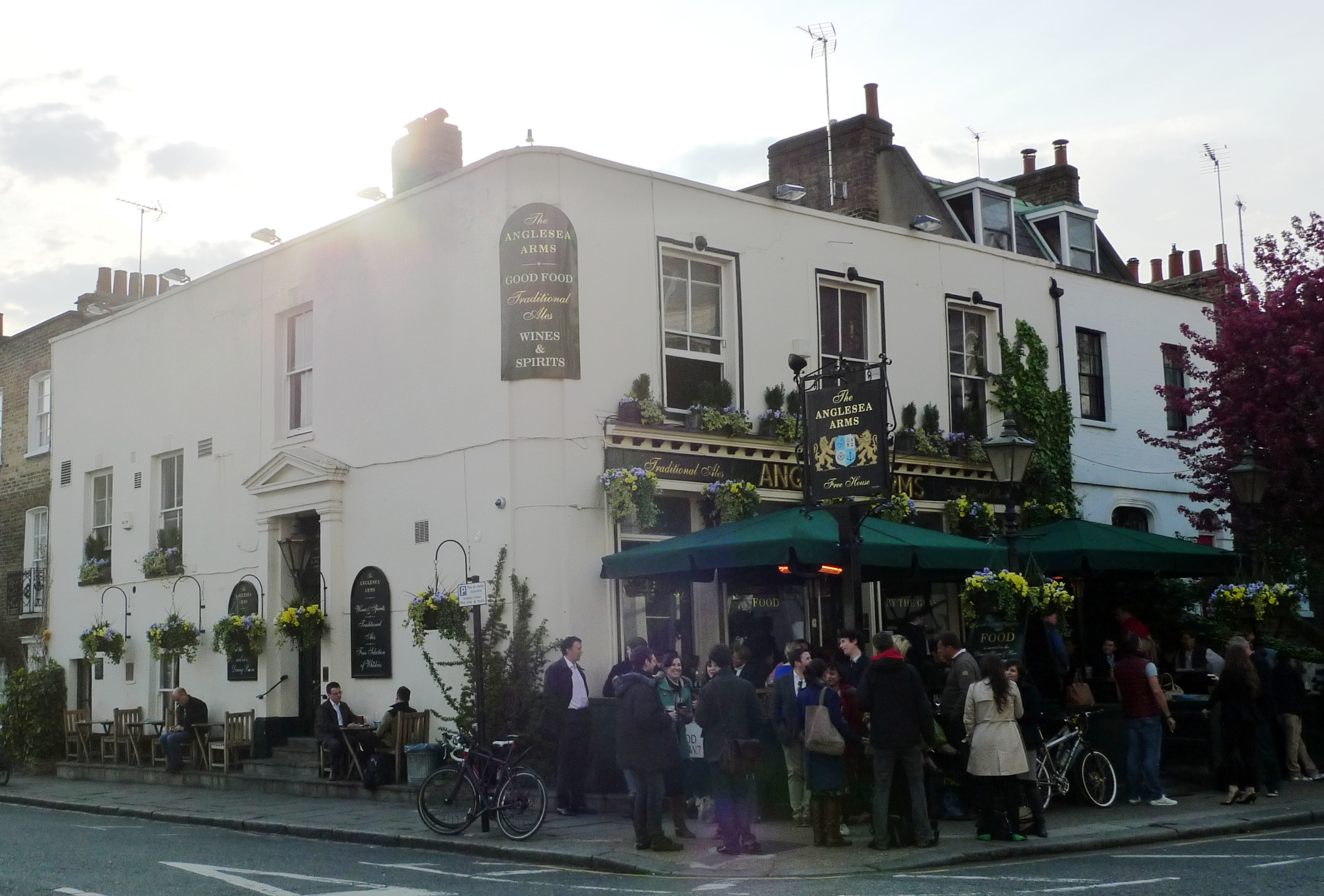

- Location within Royal Borough of Kensington and Chelsea Location within Greater London

General information
- Location: 15 Selwood Terrace, South Kensington, London, England
- Coordinates: 51.490091°N 0.177021°W

Design and construction
- Designations

Listed Building – Grade II
- Official name: Anglesea Arms Public House
- Designated: 25 June 1976
- Reference no.: 1265782

The Anglesea Arms is a pub at 15 Selwood Terrace, South Kensington, London SW7.

It is a Grade II listed building, built in the early-mid 19th century.
