= Seven Balls =

Pub in Harrow Weald, London

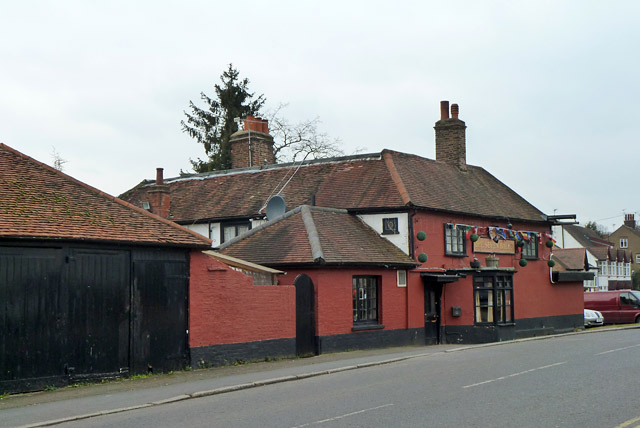
- The Seven Balls

- Location within London Borough of Harrow Location within Greater London

General information
- Location: Kenton Lane, Harrow Weald, London, England
- Coordinates: 51.6104°N 0.3302°W

Design and construction
- Designations

Listed Building – Grade II
- Official name: Seven Balls Public House
- Designated: 25 May 1983
- Reference no.: 1358636

The Seven Balls is a Grade-II-listed public house at Kenton Lane, Harrow Weald, London.

The timber-framed building is probably 17th century, but with later additions.

The pub has recently undergone a renovation which was completed in June 2019 and has been re-branded as The Seven Harrow.
