= Grade II listed buildings in the London Borough of Wandsworth =

This page is a list of classified buildings Grade IIs in the London Borough of Wandsworth.

Name	Location	Type	Completed (Note: The date given is the date used by Historic England as significant for the initial building or that of an important part in the structure's description.)	Date designated	Grid ref. (Note: Sometimes known as OSGB36, the grid reference is based on the British national grid reference system used by the Ordnance Survey.) Geo-coordinates	Entry number (Note: The "List Entry Number" is a unique number assigned to each listed building and scheduled monument by Historic England.)	Image
All Saints Church, Tooting	Brudenell Road, Tooting, Greater London, SW17 8DF	Parish church	1903 and 1906	14 July 1955	TQ2819071762; 51°25′50″N 0°09′26″W	1357655	All Saints Church, Tooting More images
Arding & Hobbs	Lavender Hill and St John's Road, Battersea, London SW11 1QL	Shop	1910	30 November 2001	TQ2740575426; 51°27′49″N 0°10′03″W	1389528	Arding & Hobbs More images
Ark John Archer Primary Academy	Plough Road, Battersea, London, SW11 2AA	School	Early 19th century	7 April 1983	TQ2689875236; 51°27′43″N 0°10′29″W	1065515	Ark John Archer Primary Academy More images
Battersea Bridge	BATTERSEA BRIDGE, BATTERSEA BRIDGE SW 11	Bridge	21 July 1890	7 April 1983	TQ2688777432; 51°28′52″N 0°10′21″W	1080752	Battersea Bridge More images
Battersea Reference Library	Altenburg Gardens, Battersea, London, SW11 1JB	Library	1924	7 April 1983	TQ2754275525; 51°27′50″N 0°09′50″W	1200731	Battersea Reference Library More images
Battersea Park railway station	Battersea Park Road, SW8	Railway station	1 May 1867		TQ2861877118; 51°28′40″N 0°08′52″W	1357652	Battersea Park railway station More images
The Bedford Hotel	77 Bedford Hill, Balham, London SW12 9HD	Public house	1931	24 August 2015	TQ2872073144; 51°26′34″N 0°08′57″W	1427422	The Bedford Hotel More images
Brandlehow School	Brandlehow Road, Putney, London SW15	School	1950	30 March 1993	TQ2466975124; 51°27′41″N 0°12′25″W	1126541	Brandlehow School More images
Chelsea Bridge	Battersea and Chelsea	Bridge	6 May 1937	26 November 2008	TQ2856377802; 51°29′05″N 0°09′00″W	1393009	Chelsea Bridge More images
Drinking Fountain, Roehampton public house	Roehampton Lane, Roehampton, London SW15	Fountain	1882	7 April 1983	TQ2241473767; 51°26′59″N 0°14′23″W	1065484	Drinking Fountain, Roehampton public house More images
The Duke's Head, Putney	8 Lower Richmond Road, Putney, London	Public house		21 October 2005	TQ2393875765; 51°28′02″N 0°13′02″W	1391758	The Duke's Head, Putney More images
Fairacres, Roehampton	1–64, Roehampton Lane SW15	Apartment		9 March 1982	TQ2207575030; 51°27′40″N 0°14′39″W	1065482	Fairacres, Roehampton More images
The Grand, Wandsworth	St Johns Hill, Clapham Junction	Theatre	1900	7 April 1983	TQ2726975368; 51°27′46″N 0°10′12″W	1064407	The Grand, Wandsworth More images
The Grapes, Wandsworth public house	39 Fairfield Street, Wandsworth, London	Public house	mid-19th century	7 April 1983	TQ2580574854; 51°27′31″N 0°11′26″W	1065528	The Grapes, Wandsworth public house More images
King's Head, Roehampton public house	1 Roehampton High Street, Roehampton, London SW15 4HL	Public house	17th century	14 July 1955	TQ2234273834; 51°27′01″N 0°14′27″W	1300007	King's Head, Roehampton public house More images
The Kings Head Public House	84 Upper Tooting Road, Tooting, London SW17 7PB	Public house	1896	24 July 1981	TQ2777772147; 51°26′03″N 0°09′46″W	1065499	The Kings Head Public House More images
Montague Arms	3 Medfield Street, Roehampton, London	Public house	17th century	25 January 1988	TQ2239073798; 51°27′00″N 0°14′24″W	1184425	Montague Arms More images
Park Lodge, Putney	289 Putney Bridge Road, Putney, London SW15	Building	17th century	14 November 1988	TQ2429075375; 51°27′49″N 0°12′44″W	1225967	Park Lodge, Putney More images
The Pines, Putney	11 Putney Hill, Putney, London	House	1870	7 April 1983	TQ2396774974; 51°27′26″N 0°13′09″W	1065520	The Pines, Putney More images
Priory Hospital	Roehampton	Hospital	1872	18 February 1975	TQ2152575185; 51°27′46″N 0°15′07″W	1184609	Priory Hospital More images
Putney Bridge	Putney Bridge SW6	Bridge	29 May 1886	7 April 1983	TQ2424775760; 51°28′01″N 0°12′47″W	1079799	Putney Bridge More images
Putney Library	Disraeli Road, Putney	Library	1899	13 December 1994	TQ2403575146; 51°27′42″N 0°12′57″W	1331702	Putney Library More images
Putney Park House	69 Pleasance Road, Roehampton	House	Built 1837–38	23 July 1983	TQ2256774953; 51°27′37″N 0°14′14″W	1300065	Putney Park House More images
Raven Inn public house	140 Westbridge Road, Battersea, London SW11	Public house	Late 17th century	28 June 1954	TQ2684776737; 51°28′31″N 0°10′30″W	1299760	Raven Inn public house More images
Rosslyn Tower	St John's Avenue, Putney	House	1870	5 July 1974	TQ2407374906; 51°27′36″N 0°13′01″W	1357696	Rosslyn Tower More images
Spread Eagle public house	69–71 Wandsworth High Street, Wandsworth	Public house	Late 19th century	7 April 1983	TQ2568874616; 51°27′24″N 0°11′32″W	1065502	Spread Eagle public house More images
St Thomas a Becket	West Hill, Wandsworth, London SW18	Church	1895	7 April 1983	TQ2507674656; 51°27′25″N 0°12′04″W	1065467	St Thomas a Becket More images
Thornhill House	78 Deodar Road, Putney, London SW15	House	Late 19th century	16 April 2004	TQ2454575353; 51°27′48″N 0°12′31″W	1390837	Thornhill House More images
Three Standing Figures 1947	Battersea Park	Sculpture	1948	29 March 1988	TQ2817877118; 51°28′41″N 0°09′25″W	1357691	Three Standing Figures 1947 More images
Wandsworth Common Windmill	Wandsworth Common	Windmill	19th century	7 March 1983	TQ2680574465; 51°27′18″N 0°10′35″W	1183658	Wandsworth Common Windmill More images
West Hill	29 and 31, WEST HILL SW18	Building	Early 19th century	7 April 1983	TQ2517374622; 51°27′24″N 0°11′59″W	1065464	West Hill More images
The White Lion public house	14–16 High Street, Putney	Public house	Built 1887	7 April 1983	TQ2411475596; 51°27′57″N 0°12′53″W	1184658	The White Lion public house More images
Winchester House	10 Lower Richmond Road, Putney	House	18th century	14 July 1955	TQ2391875774; 51°28′03″N 0°13′03″W	1300160	Winchester House More images
23 Oakhill Road	Oakhill Road, Putney, London SW15	House	Late 19th century	24 February 1970	TQ2473674903; 51°27′34″N 0°12′21″W	1184564	23 Oakhill Road More images
25 Oakhill Road	Oakhill Road, Putney, London SW15	House	Late 19th century	24 February 1970	TQ2475474904; 51°27′34″N 0°12′21″W	1065513	25 Oakhill Road More images
92 St John's Hill	Battersea, London SW11	House	Built 1909	7 April 1983	TQ2688275144; 51°27′40″N 0°10′30″W	1184815	92 St John's Hill More images
155–171 Oakhill Road	155–171, OAKHILL ROAD	Cottages	Built 1906	24 March 2011	TQ2516074957; 51°27′35″N 0°11′59″W	1242951	155–171 Oakhill Road More images

== See also ==
- Grade I and II* listed buildings in the London Borough of Wandsworth
