= Edward Hunt =

Edward Hunt may refer to:

- Edward Hunt (shipbuilder) (c. 1730–1787), British shipbuilder and designer
- Edward Hunt (politician) (1792–1866), Australian businessman and politician
- Edward Hunt (architect) (1877–1963), British architect
- Edward Eyre Hunt Jr. (1922–1991), American physical anthropologist and human biologist
