= Wandsworth High Street =

Street in Wandsworth, London

Coordinates: 51°27′25.74″N 0°11′39.78″W

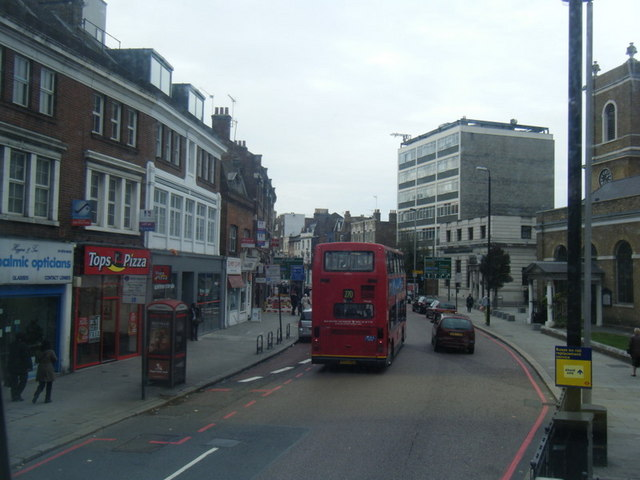
Wandsworth High Street

Wandsworth High Street is the main shopping street in Wandsworth, London, England. It forms part of the London inner ring road, the South Circular Road; it is also part of the westbound A3 (the eastbound carriageway follows a parallel road).

The street runs west to east, with West Hill and East Hill forming the continuation at either end.

== Ram Brewery ==
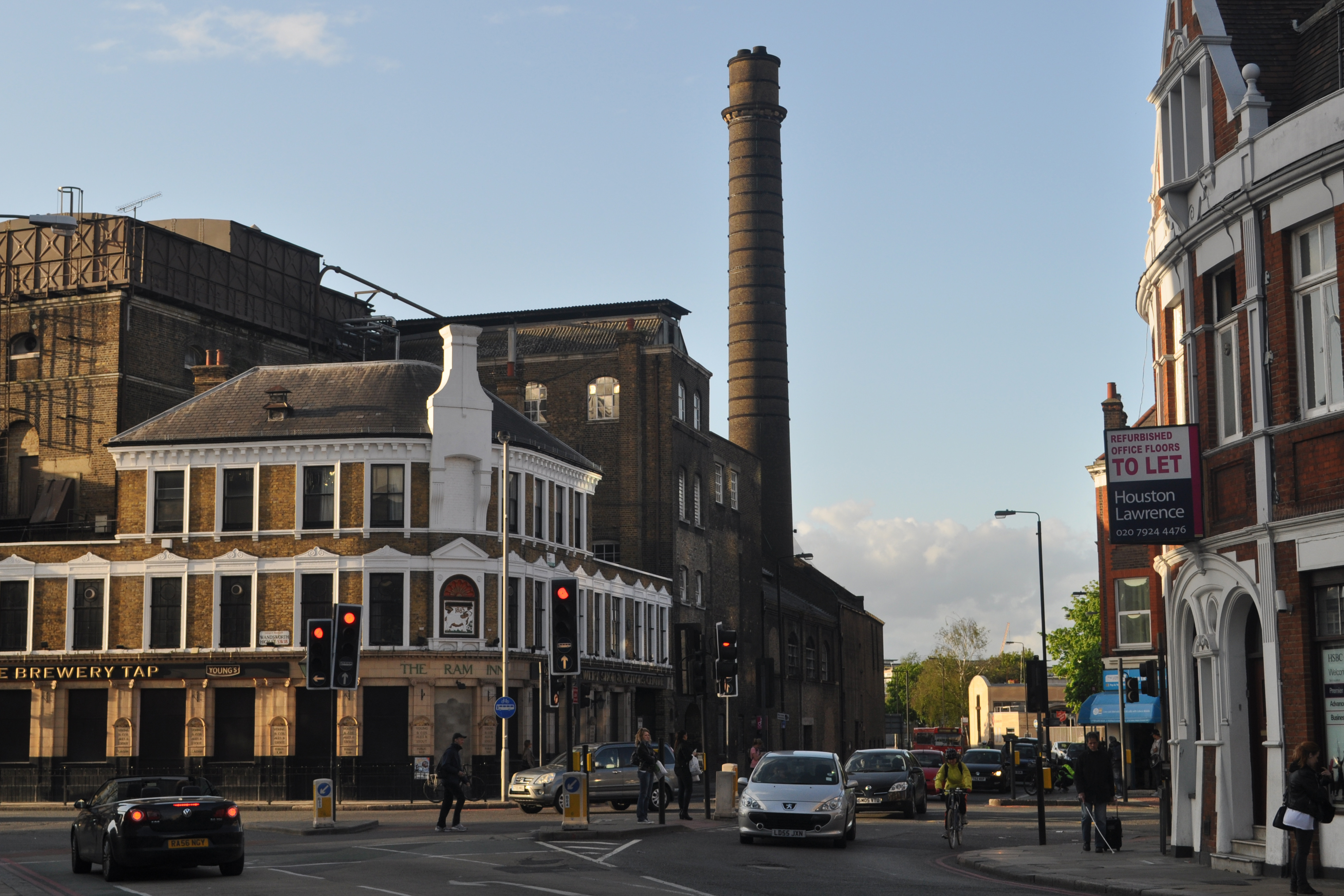
The former Ram Brewery complex on Wandsworth High Street

The High Street was formerly dominated by the Ram Brewery, the oldest continuously operating brewery in the United Kingdom. Operating from 1533 to 2006, the brewery has now closed, and the site has been redeveloped as the "Ram Quarter". The original Ram Inn public house continues to operate, and from 2019 is again brewing beer on the site.

== Listed buildings ==
Wandsworth High Street counts several listed buildings amongst its notable structures. These include:

- Wandsworth Town Hall (grade II), borough council headquarters, built 1926, extended 1935-1937
- All Saints Church (grade II*), a parish church, founded by 1234, current building 1630
- The Ram Inn (grade II*), public house, founded by 1533, current building 1883
- The Spread Eagle (grade II), public house, dates unknown
