= Lancaster Place =

Street in the City of Westminster, London

Coordinates: 51.5105°N 0.1187°W

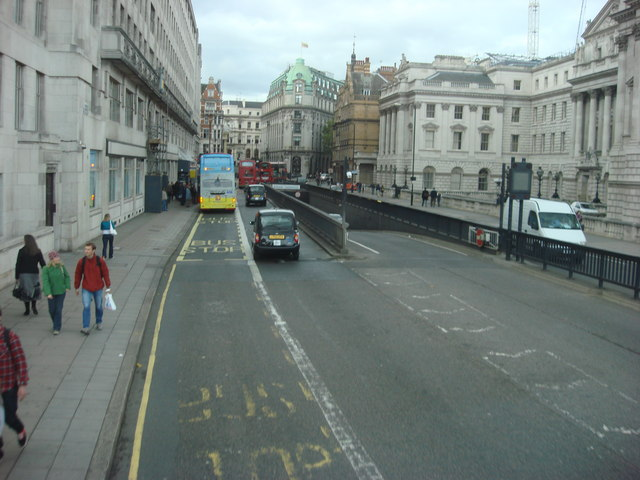
Lancaster Place, looking north

Lancaster Place is a short section of road in central London, which connects Waterloo Bridge to the major junction with the Aldwych and Strand. It assumed its current name in 1818, shortly after Waterloo Bridge was opened, replacing an earlier road called Wellington Street. Lancaster Place is bisected by the northbound-only Strand Underpass which opened in 1964 and passes below Aldwych, enabling Kingsway-bound traffic to skip the Lancaster Place–Strand–Aldwych junction. Brettenham House and Somerset House front onto the west and east sides of Lancaster Place respectively.

== History ==
The road which eventually became Lancaster Place was originally a small lane called Wellington Street, which ran south from the Strand past Somerset House to the Somerset Stairs on the River Thames. When Waterloo Bridge was completed and opened in 1817, a new avenue was included at a higher level which linked the bridge to the Strand to the north. This was named Lancaster Place in 1818; the original announcement in the newspapers of the time said that would be a separate Lancaster Place and Lancaster Street, but these were eventually consolidated as Lancaster Place only.

In 1964, the Strand underpass was opened in the centre of Lancaster Place, allowing northbound traffic coming from Waterloo Bridge to pass directly through to Kingsway, avoiding the need to pass through the intersection with the Strand and bypassing the Aldwych surface streets. It had taken 15 months to build, and reused part of recently-closed Kingsway tram tunnel. At the time of opening, it reduced the traffic at the northern end of Lancaster Place by 50%. The tunnel is for cars only, being prohibited to bicycles and larger vehicles.

== Architecture ==
The eastern side of Lancaster Place is mostly occupied by Somerset House, a large neoclassical building lying principally on the Strand. The current Somerset House was designed by William Chambers from 1776, replacing an older building on the site which had originally belonged to Edward Seymour, 1st Duke of Somerset and was later used as a royal residence before eventually being repurposed as the home of the General Register Office. It is now a public space hosting various exhibitions and events. The facade visible from Lancaster Place is the building's New Wing, which was built between 1851 and 1856, as office accommodation for the Inland Revenue. The architect for this development was James Pennethorne.

On the west of the street is Brettenham House, an office building with a Portland Stone facade, opened in 1932. It was designed by the father and son William and Edward Hunt. The site of the building belongs to the Duchy of Lancaster, which also has its headquarters in the building with a separate entrance at 1 Lancaster Place.

== Transport ==
Several Transport for London bus routes operate along Lancaster Place, with a single stop on each side of the road. As of 2025, the northbound stop, titled Lancaster Place stop T, serves buses 1, 59, 68, 76, 139, 172, 176, 188, 243, 341, N1, N68, N171, N343 and SL6. On the southbound side, the bus stop Lancaster Place / Somerset House, stop B, serves the 139, 176 and N343 only with other routes using nearby stops not directly on Lancaster Place.
