= Ram Inn, Wandsworth =

Pub in Wandsworth, London

Coordinates: 51.456956°N 0.192908°W

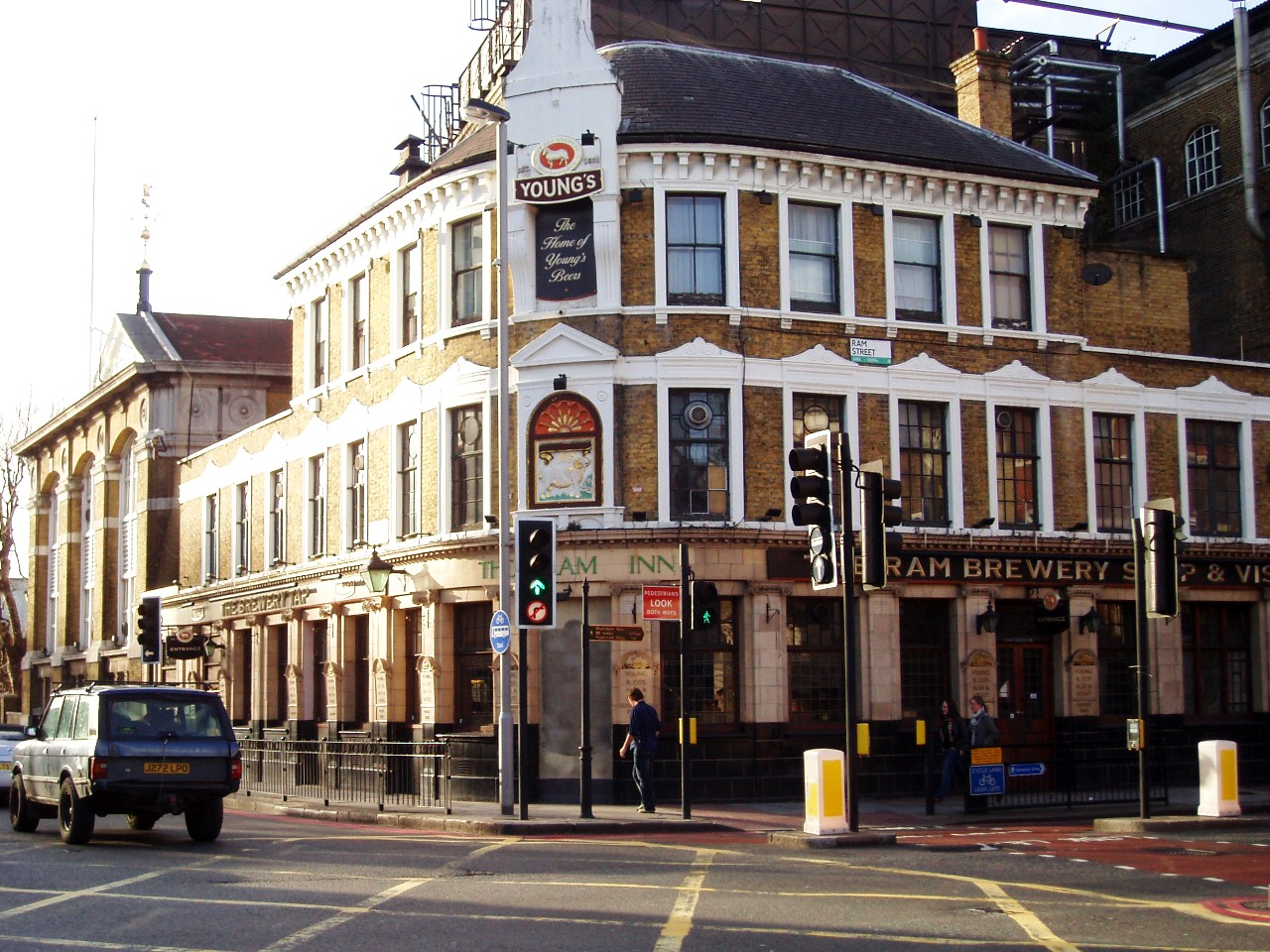
The Ram Inn, Wandsworth

The Ram Inn (also known as The Brewery Tap, which was its name for much of the later twentieth century) is a historic pub at 68 Wandsworth High Street, Wandsworth, London SW18.

== History ==
There is evidence that a pub has been on the site since 1533, and that it was named The Ram Inn from at least 1581. The current building is a Grade II listed building, constructed in 1883, with remodelling in the 1930s. It formed part of the brewery complex of the former Young's brewery and although it was historically known as the Ram Inn, in the twentieth century its name was changed to The Brewery Tap. Controversially, the pub closed in 2006 when Young's closed the Ram Brewery.

== Current operation ==
The pub reopened in October 2019, and reverted to its original name of The Ram Inn. The re-opened pub continues to have a traditional feel in its ground floor bar, but has adopted a more contemporary style in the first floor bar.

== Brewing on site ==
The pub has always been associated with on-site brewing, and served its own beer from 1533. Elizabeth Ridon, who leased out the premises, is recorded as the owner in 1550. In 1576 Humphrey Langridge, "beer-brewer at Wandsworth", is recorded as the brewer and landlord in assize court records following a burglary at The Ram (also recorded as "the Rame" in 1581, still with Langridge in charge). Records from 1675 show that the brewery was run by the Draper family, and in the 18th century, the Trittons purchased the brewery.

The Ram Brewery was purchased by Charles Allen Young and Anthony Fothergill Bainbridge in 1831. Thereafter it was operated continuously by the Young family, supplying a large network of Young's public houses, from 1831 until its closure in 2006. The last chairman of Young & Co based at the Ram Brewery was John Young, the great-great-grandson of the Young's founder. John Young died just a few days before the closure of the Ram Brewery, a closure which he had announced earlier that year. Young's administrative offices remained at The Ram Brewery until 2007, when they relocated within Wandsworth. From the autumn of 2006 Young's beer was brewed at the Eagle Brewery in Bedford.

At the time of its closure in 2006 Young's claimed that the Ram Brewery was the oldest British brewery in continuous operation. The Ram Inn, then known as The Brewery Tap, closed in 2006 with the closure of the Ram Brewery.

In October 2019, when the Ram Inn re-opened under new management, a new brewery also opened on the site. Named SlyBeast Brewing, its flagship beer in marketed as "1533" in reference to the earliest known date of the Ram Inn, and of beer brewing on the site.
