= Wandsworth Town Hall =

Municipal building in London, England

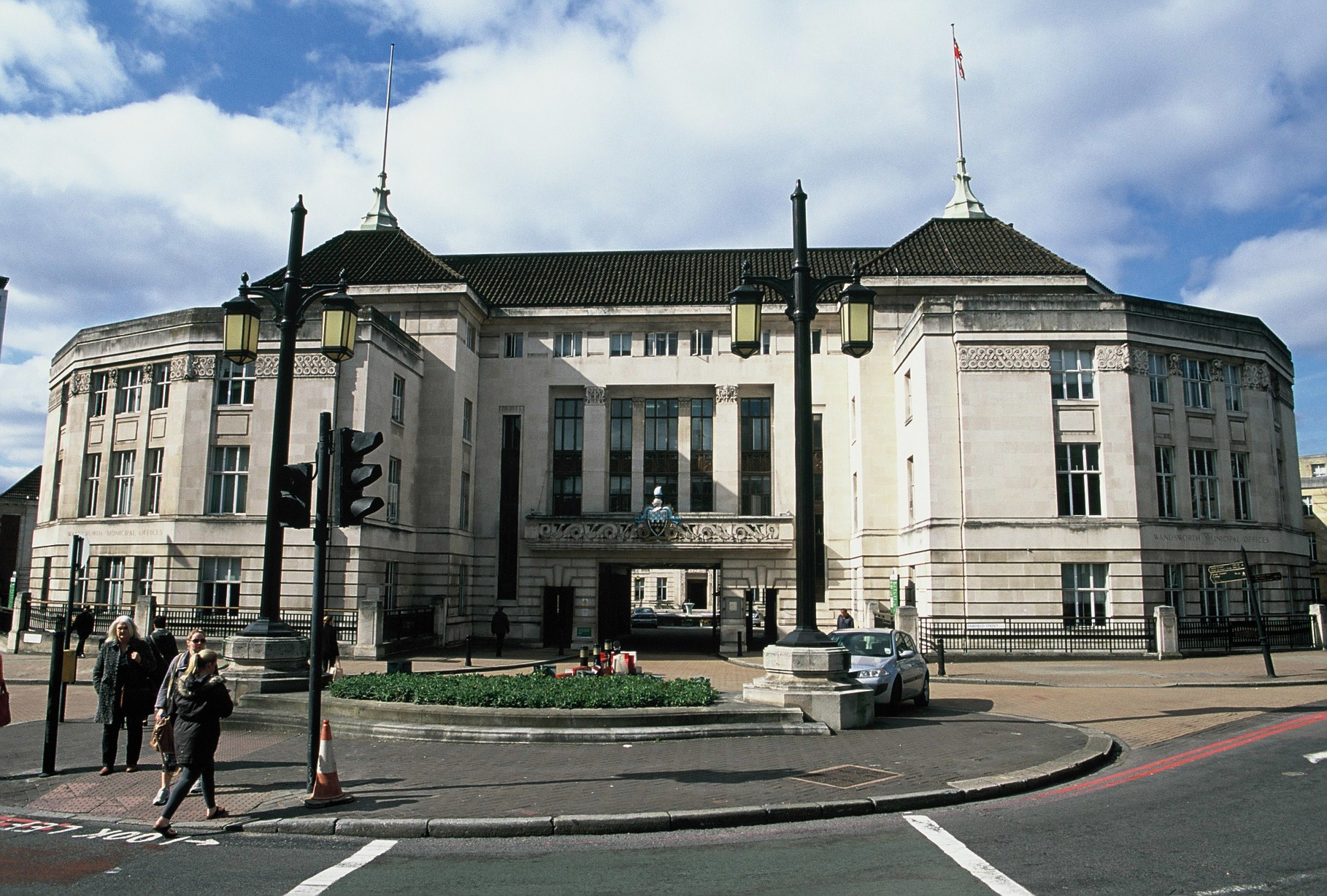
- Wandsworth Town Hall

- Shown in Wandsworth
- 51.4574°N 0.1909°W
- Location: Wandsworth High Street, Wandsworth

History
- Built: 1937

Site notes
- Architect: Edward A. Hunt
- Architectural style: International Moderne style

Listed Building – Grade II
- Designated: 8 June 1994
- Reference no.: 1244323

Wandsworth Town Hall is a municipal building on the corner of Wandsworth High Street and Fairfield Street in Wandsworth, London. The building, which is the headquarters of Wandsworth London Borough Council, is a Grade II listed building.

== History ==
In the mid-19th century Wandsworth Vestry met in the vestry room of All Saints Church. After civic leaders found this arrangement was inadequate, they decided to procure a purpose-built vestry hall: the site selected was a row of properties in the High Street. The new building was designed by George Patrick in a mixture of the Italianate and French Renaissance styles, built by Mr Parsons of Wandsworth and completed in 1882. It went on to become the headquarters of the Metropolitan Borough of Wandsworth as "Wandsworth Town Hall" in 1900.

A modest two-storey structure faced in red-brick over channeled stone, designed by Ernest Elford in the Classical style, and now known as the "civic suite", was erected in the High Street to the east of the vestry hall in 1927. The design involved an asymmetrical main frontage with eleven bays facing onto the High Street; the left section of two bays featured a canopied doorway on the ground floor with a pediment containing the metropolitan borough's coat of arms above; there was a row of round-headed windows interspersed with Doric order pilasters on the first floor. A projecting clock was erected on the outside of the building.

This was followed by a huge stone facility to the east on the corner of the High Street and Fairfield Street, designed by Edward A. Hunt in the International Moderne style, built by Dove Brothers of Islington and originally known as the "municipal buildings". The corner section of Hunt's building featured a vehicle entrance leading to a central courtyard at ground level; there was a Vitruvian scroll bearing the borough coat of arms with five tall windows on the first floor; the corner section connected two blocks each of which had finials on the roof. The High Street facade of Hunt's building, which extended to 15 bays, was embellished by a frieze, carved by David Evans and John Linehan, depicting local historical scenes. The municipal buildings were officially opened by Queen Mary on 14 July 1937. The principal room was a polygon-shaped council chamber which projected from the rear of the building.

The complex continued to function as the local seat of government when the enlarged London Borough of Wandsworth was formed in 1965. The original vestry hall, which had suffered considerable damage during the Blitz in the Second World War, was demolished in the 1970s to make way for a modern office block designed by Culpin and Partners, located to the west the civic suite, which was completed in 1975.

Princess Alexandra opened a new borough register office in the town hall in 1993 and returned to attend a citizenship ceremony the council chamber in May 2012.
