= St Thomas a Becket, Wandsworth =

Roman Catholic church in Wandsworth, London, England

Coordinates: 51.457074°N 0.201151°W

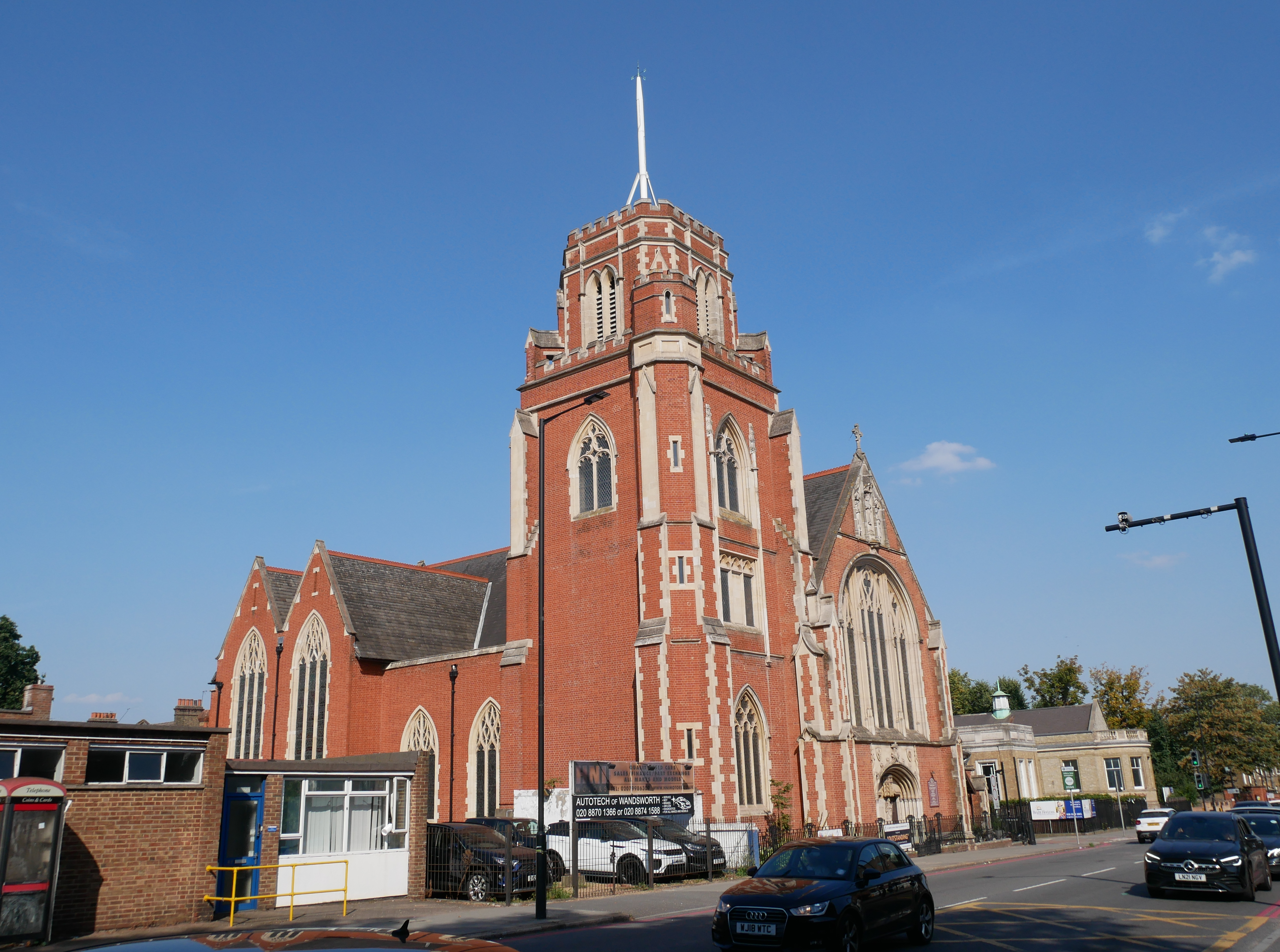
Southwest view of the church

St Thomas a Becket is a Grade II listed Roman Catholic church at West Hill, Wandsworth, London SW18.

It was built in 1895 in a Perpendicular style, and the architect was Edward Goldie.
