= Raven Inn, Battersea =

Pub in Battersea, London

Coordinates: 51.475382°N 0.174929°W

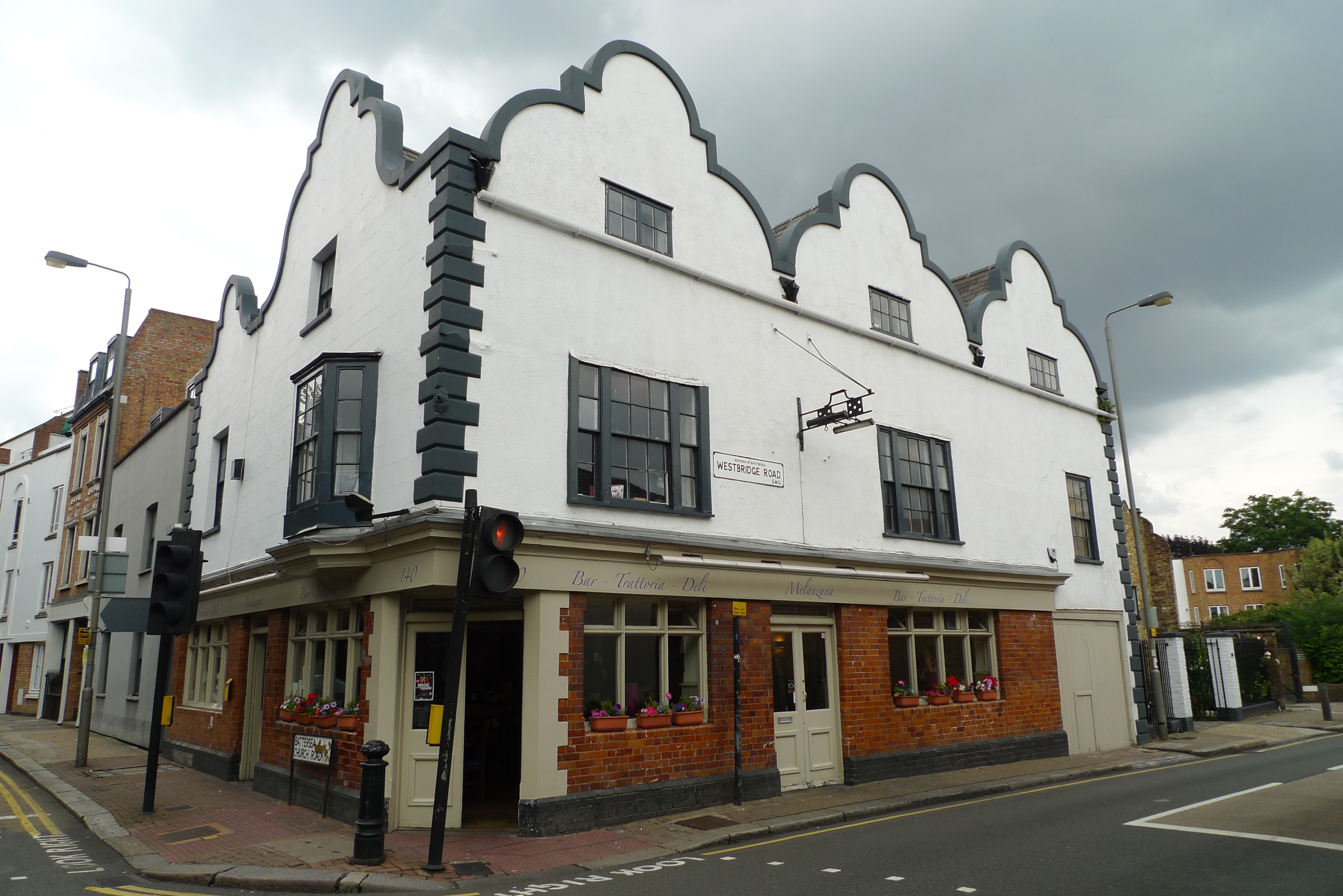
Melanzana, formerly the Raven Inn, in 2011

The Raven Inn is a former pub at 140 Westbridge Road, Battersea, London SW11. It was a pub until at least 2009, but is now Melanzana, an Italian restaurant.

It is a Grade II listed building, dating back to the late 17th century.
