= Drinking Fountain, Roehampton =

Sculptural monument by J. C. Radford

Coordinates: 51.449666°N 0.239754°W

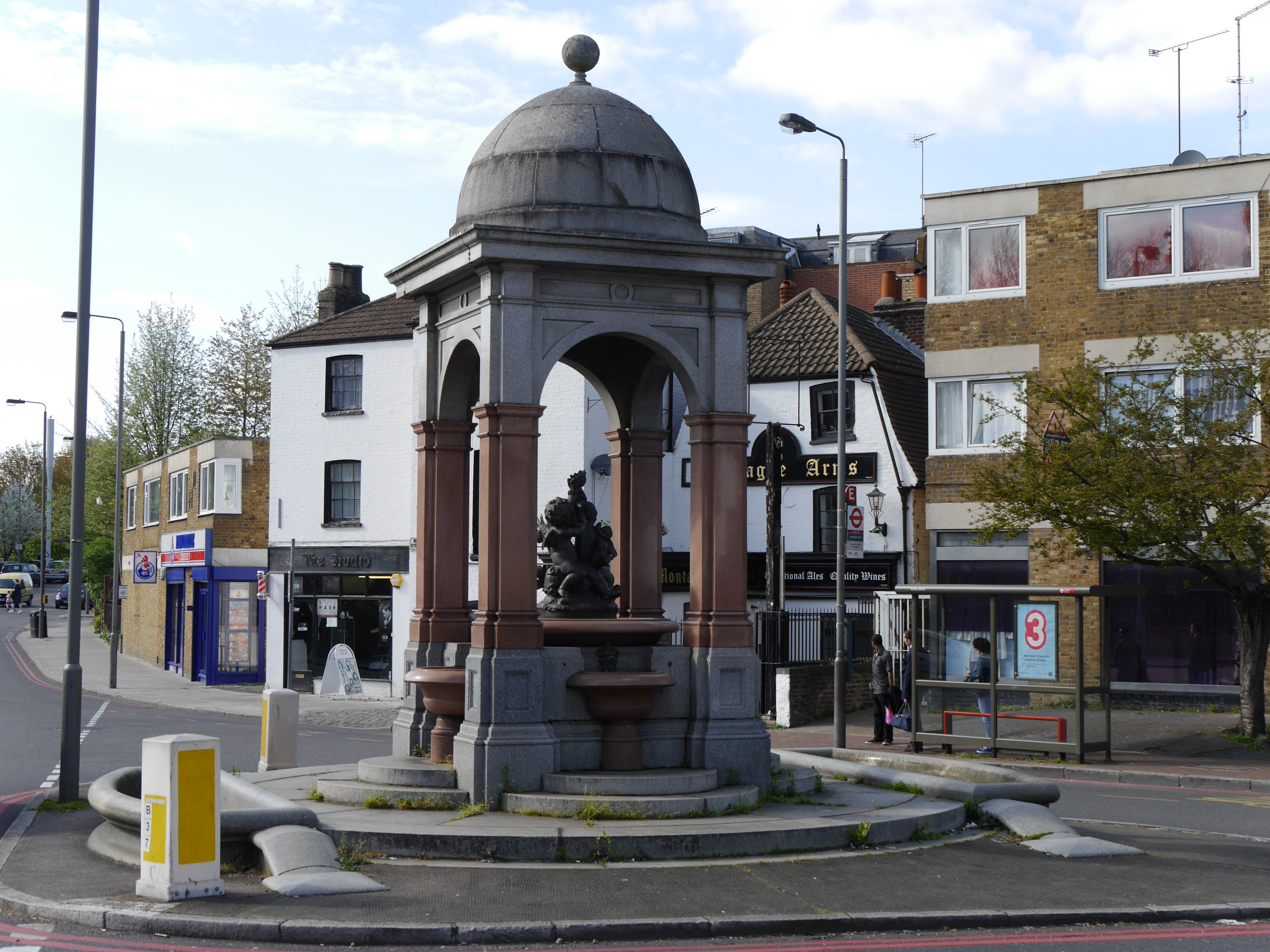
Drinking Fountain, Roehampton, 2014

The Drinking Fountain is a Grade II-listed monument at Roehampton Lane, Roehampton, London SW15.

It was built in 1882, and designed by J. C. Radford.
