= All Saints Church, Wandsworth =

Coordinates: 51.4576°N 0.1954°W

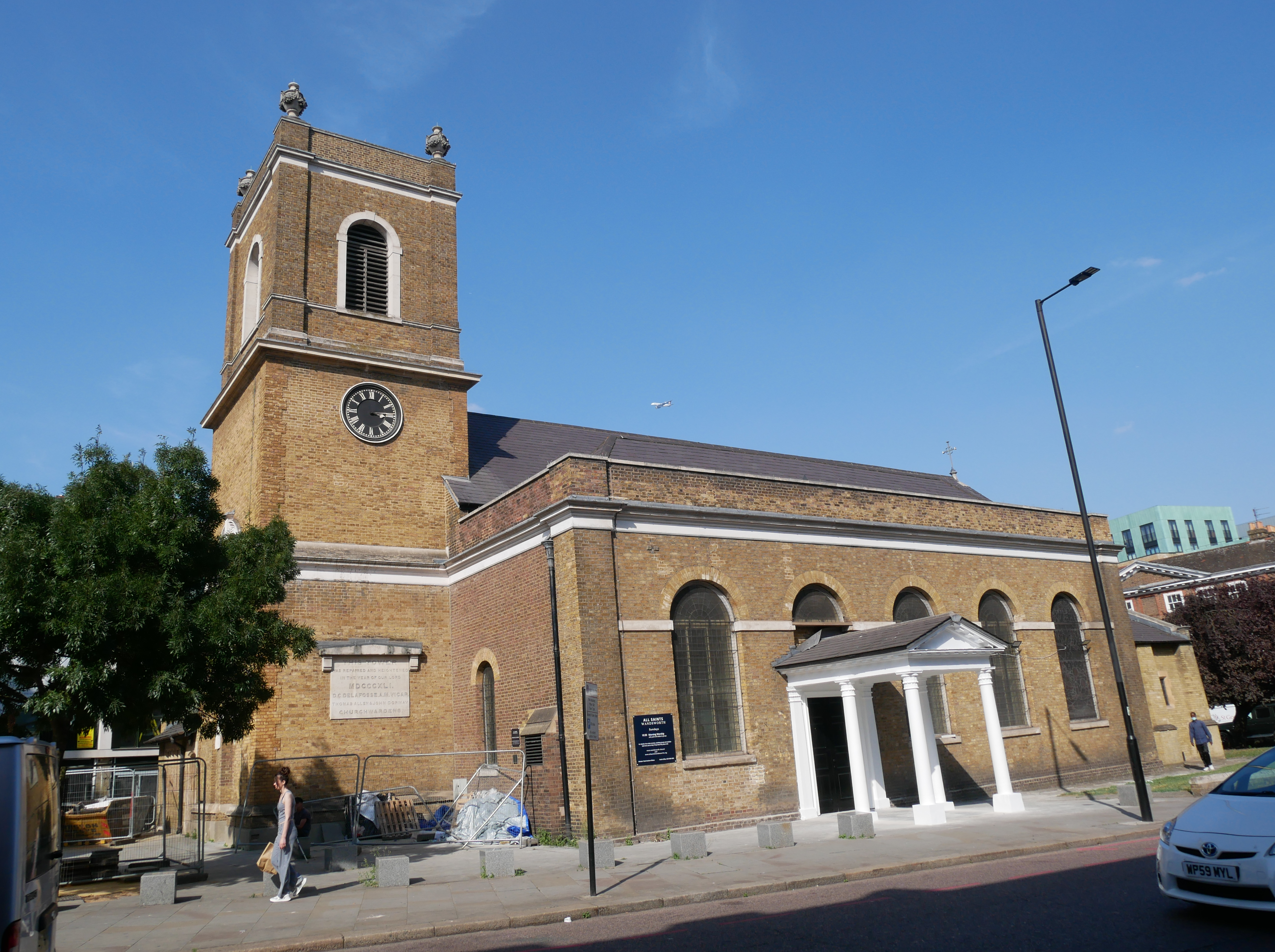
- Southwest view of the church
- All Saints Church, Wandsworth
- Location: Wandsworth High Street, Wandsworth, Greater London, SW18 4LA
- Country: England
- Denomination: Church of England
- Churchmanship: Evangelical Anglicanism
- Website: https://www.wandsworth.church/

History
- Status: Active

Architecture
- Functional status: Parish church
- Heritage designation: Grade II* listed

Administration
- Diocese: Diocese of Southwark
- Archdeaconry: Archdeaconry of Wandsworth
- Parish: All Saints, Wandsworth

Clergy
- Vicar: Revd David Simpson

All Saints Church, Wandsworth, is a Grade II* listed church in Wandsworth High Street, London. It is a Church of England parish church, and the original parish church of Wandsworth. Revd David Simpson became the Vicar of the Parish of Wandsworth in 2023 after working at Holy Trinity Brompton.

== Origins ==
There has been a church on the site since at least 1234, when John de Panormo was granted a dispensation 'to hold the Church of Wandsworth' as well as one in Italy.

== The present building ==
The present church originates from 1630. However, only the tower actually dates from this period; the north aisle was built in 1716, while most of the remainder dates from the rebuilding of 1780. Further alterations and additions were made in the 19th century; these included the strengthening of the tower in 1841 to accommodate a new set of bells, and a new chancel by E. W. Mountford, completed in 1900.

Today, All Saints shares its parish with the nearby church of Holy Trinity. Co-Mission planted a congregation ('Christ Church All Saints') into All Saints in 2019 under the leadership of Revd Andy O'Brien.

== Interior ==
The interior has Robert Adam-like columns of wood, painted as marble, with a frieze and enriched cornice. Some monuments from the original church still survive in the present building; these include a brass to a soldier of King Henry V, and monuments to Susannah Powell (1620) and Alderman Henry Smith (1627).

== Gallery ==
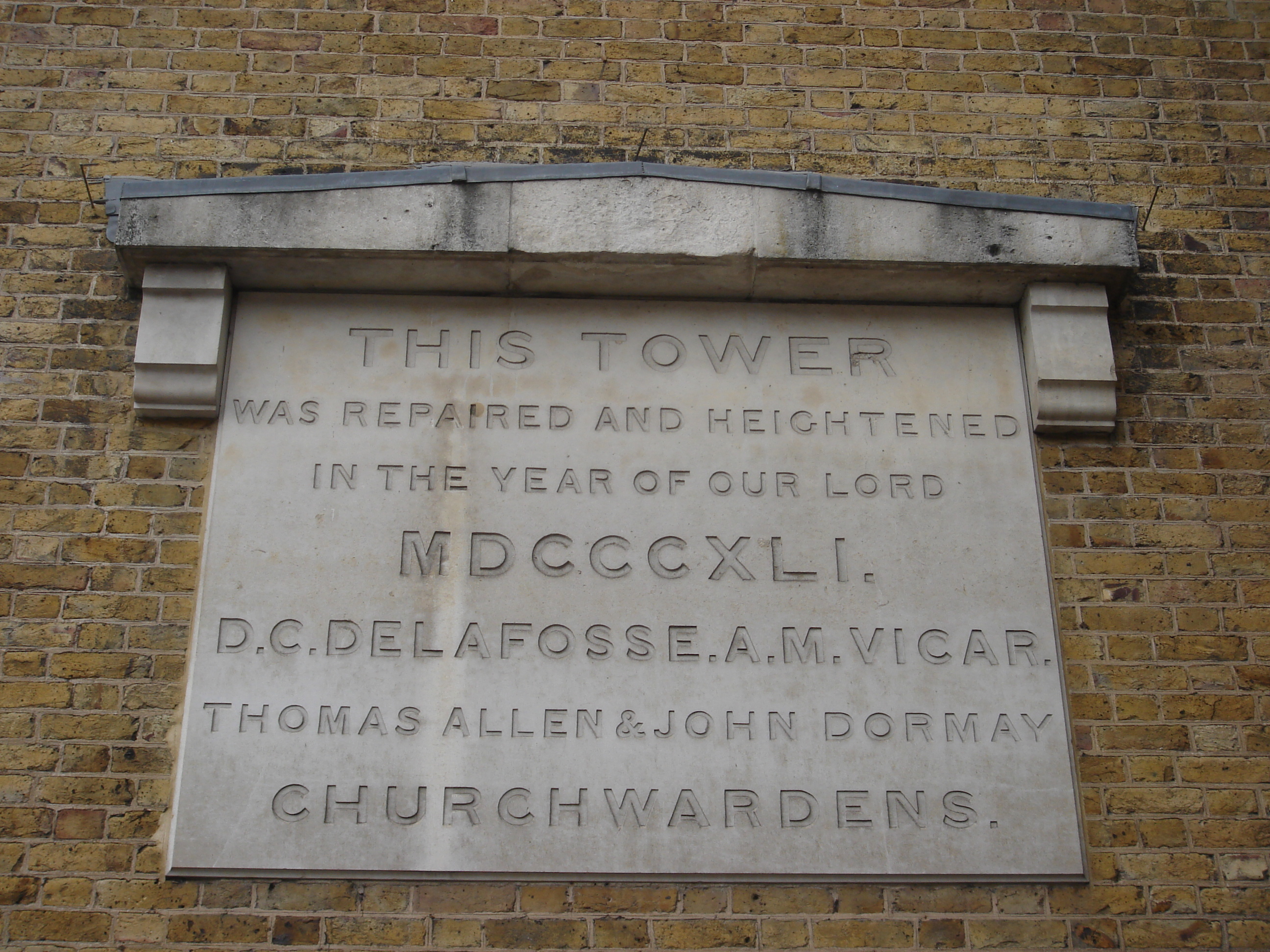
Plaque on the tower commemorating the strengthening of 1841

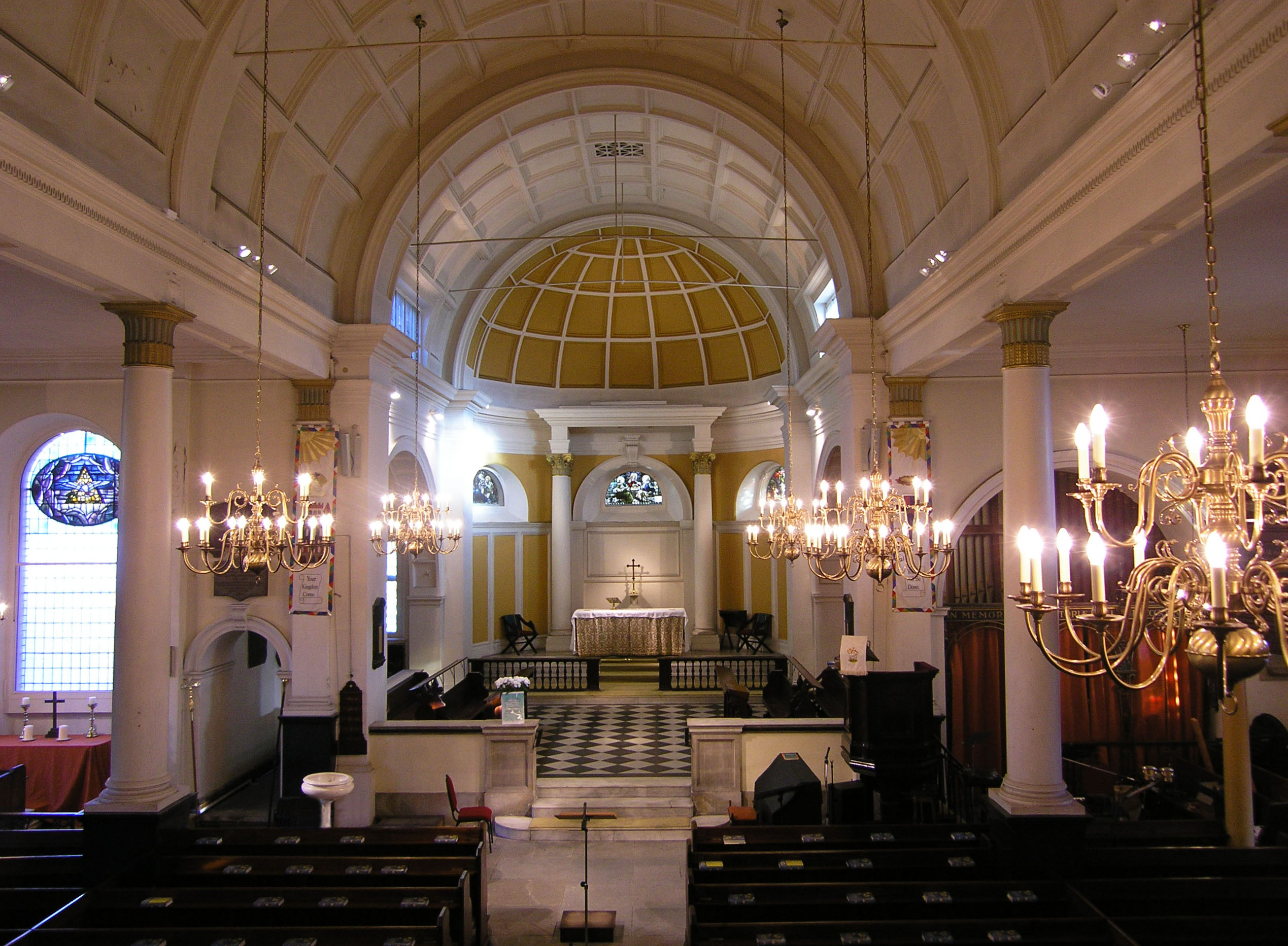
Interior of All Saints

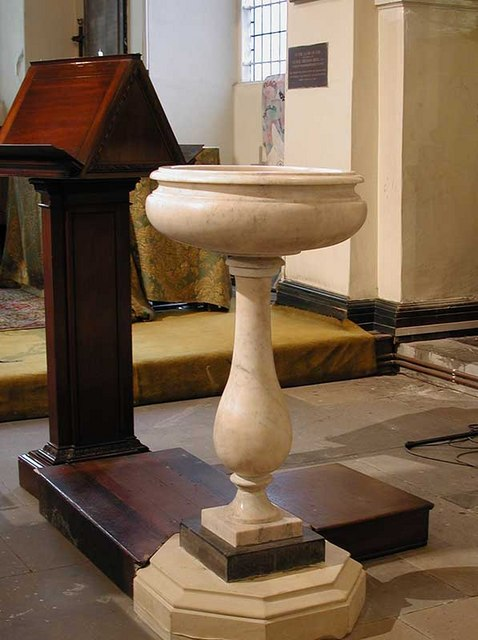
The font

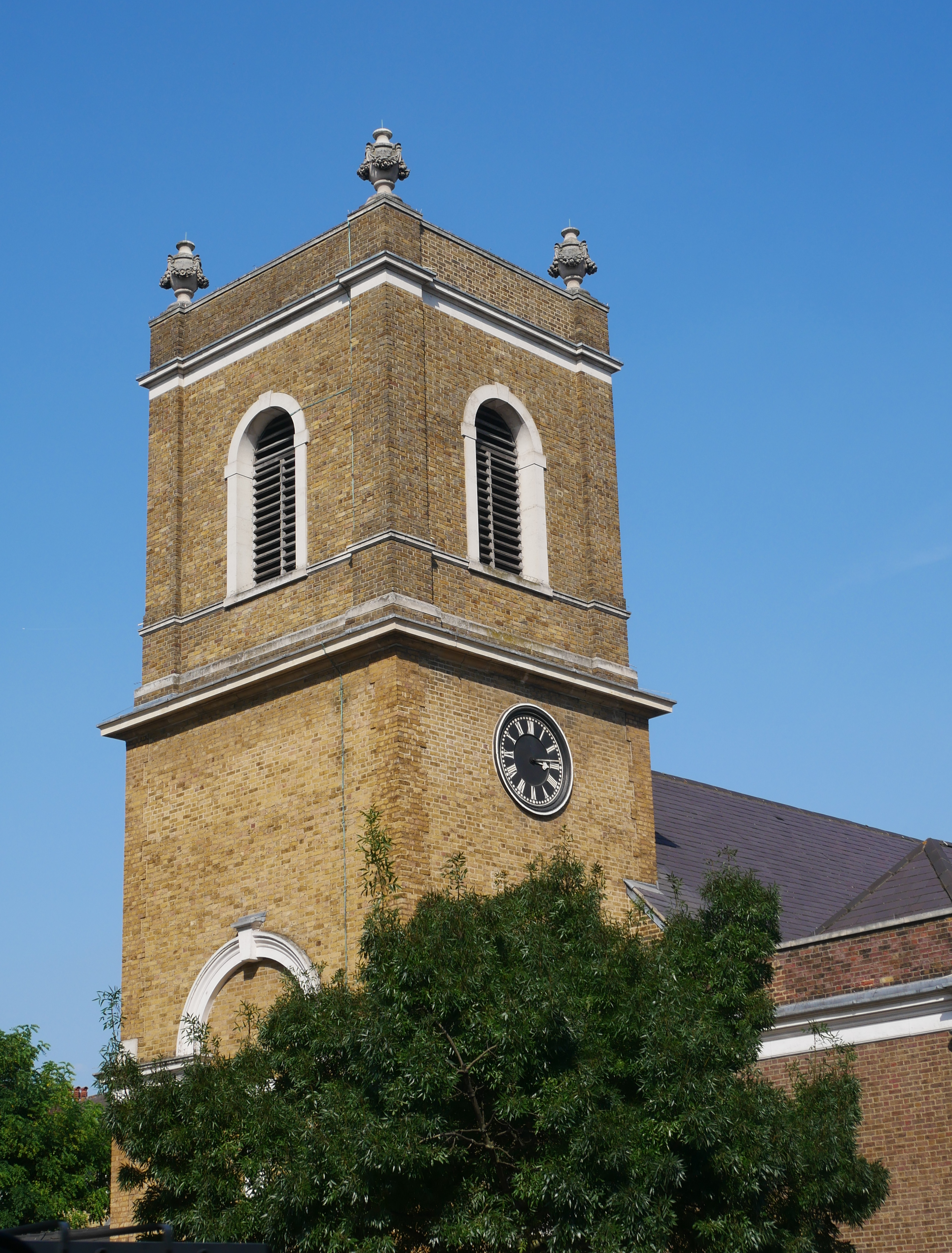
The tower
