= Putney Park House =

House in Roehampton, London, England

Coordinates: 51.460292°N 0.23714225°W

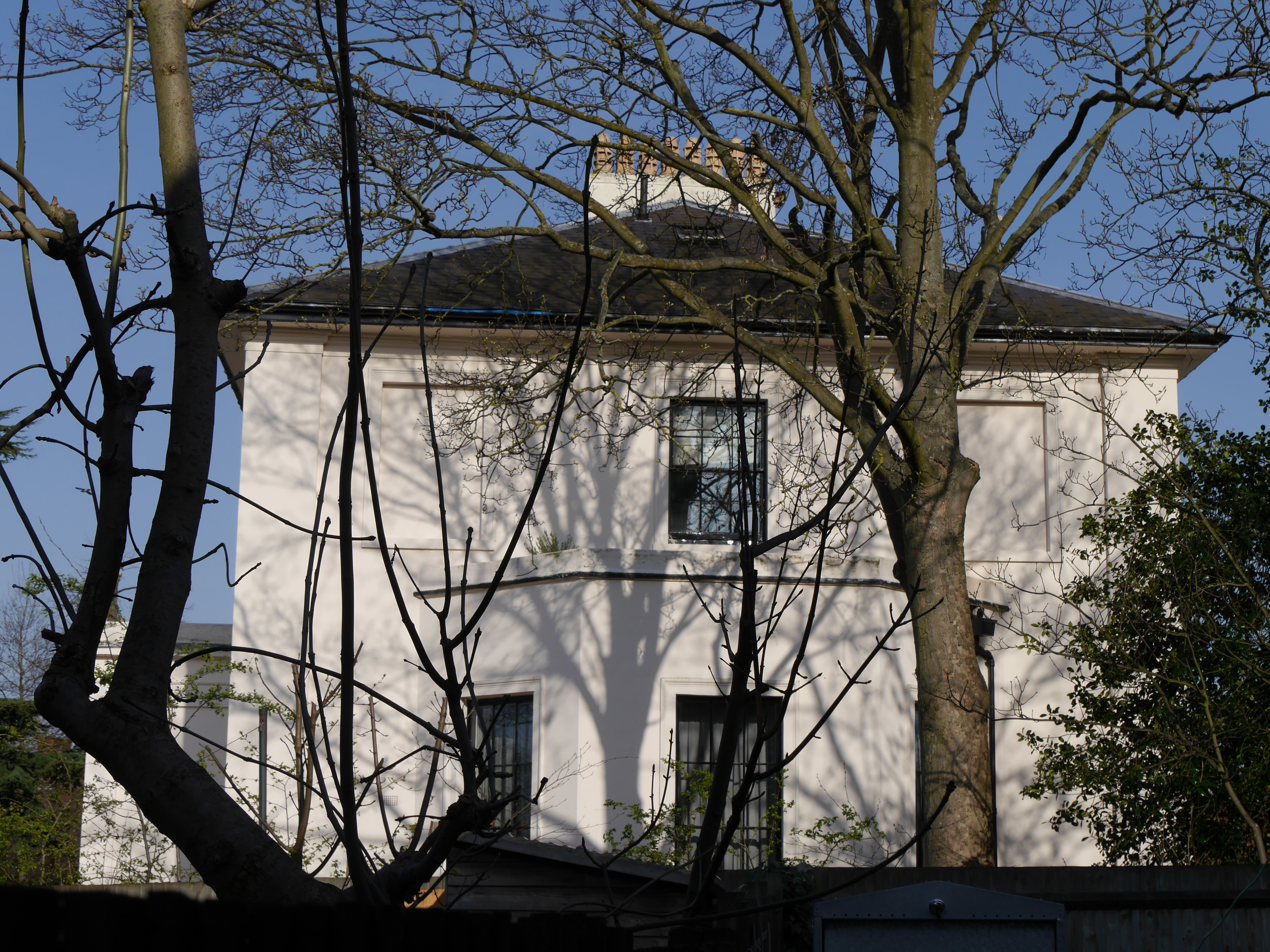
Putney Park House

Putney Park House is a Grade II listed house at 69 Pleasance Road, Roehampton, London.

It was built in 1837–38 by the architect Decimus Burton for Robert Hutton.
