= Wandsworth Common Windmill =

Windmill at Wandsworth Common, London, England

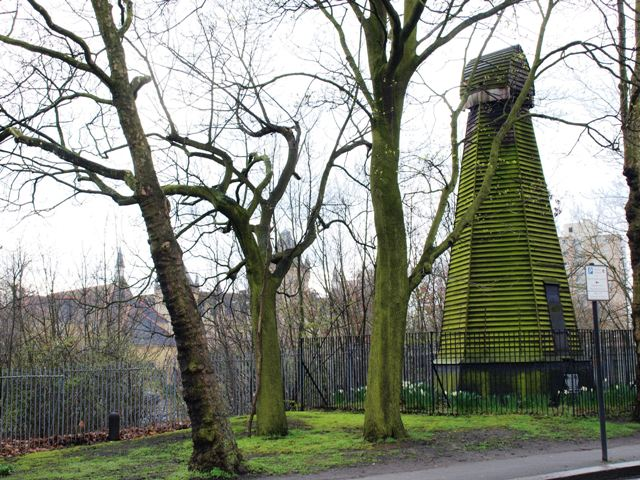
- The mill in 2010

Origin
- Mill name: Wandsworth Common Mill
- Grid reference: TQ 26805 74465
- Coordinates: 51°27′18″N 0°10′35″W
- Year built: 1837

Information
- Purpose: Drainage mill
- Type: Smock mill
- Storeys: Three-storey smock
- Base storeys: Low base of less than one storey
- Smock sides: Six sides
- No. of sails: Four sails
- Type of sails: Patent sails
- Winding: Fantail

Wandsworth Common Windmill is a conserved grade II listed smock mill at Wandsworth Common, in the London Borough of Wandsworth in the United Kingdom.

== History ==
Wandsworth Common Windmill was built in 1837 to drain water from the railway cutting of the London and Southampton Railway. The water was pumped into an ornamental lake on Wandsworth Common known as the Black Sea, which had been dug by Mr Wilson, the founder of Price's Candle Works. The mill was working c1870, but the Black Sea was drained and filled in around 1884. The mill then lost its purpose and ceased work, with the sails and fantail being removed.

== Description ==
Wandsworth Common Windmill is a small hexagonal smock mill built on a low brick base. It had a small cap and was powered by four Patent sails. The cap was winded by a fantail. The smock stands today, with a reconstructed cap, replacing the pyramidal roof it bore in the 1960s.
