= Putney Library =

Library in Putney, London, England

Coordinates: 51.461707°N 0.215955°W

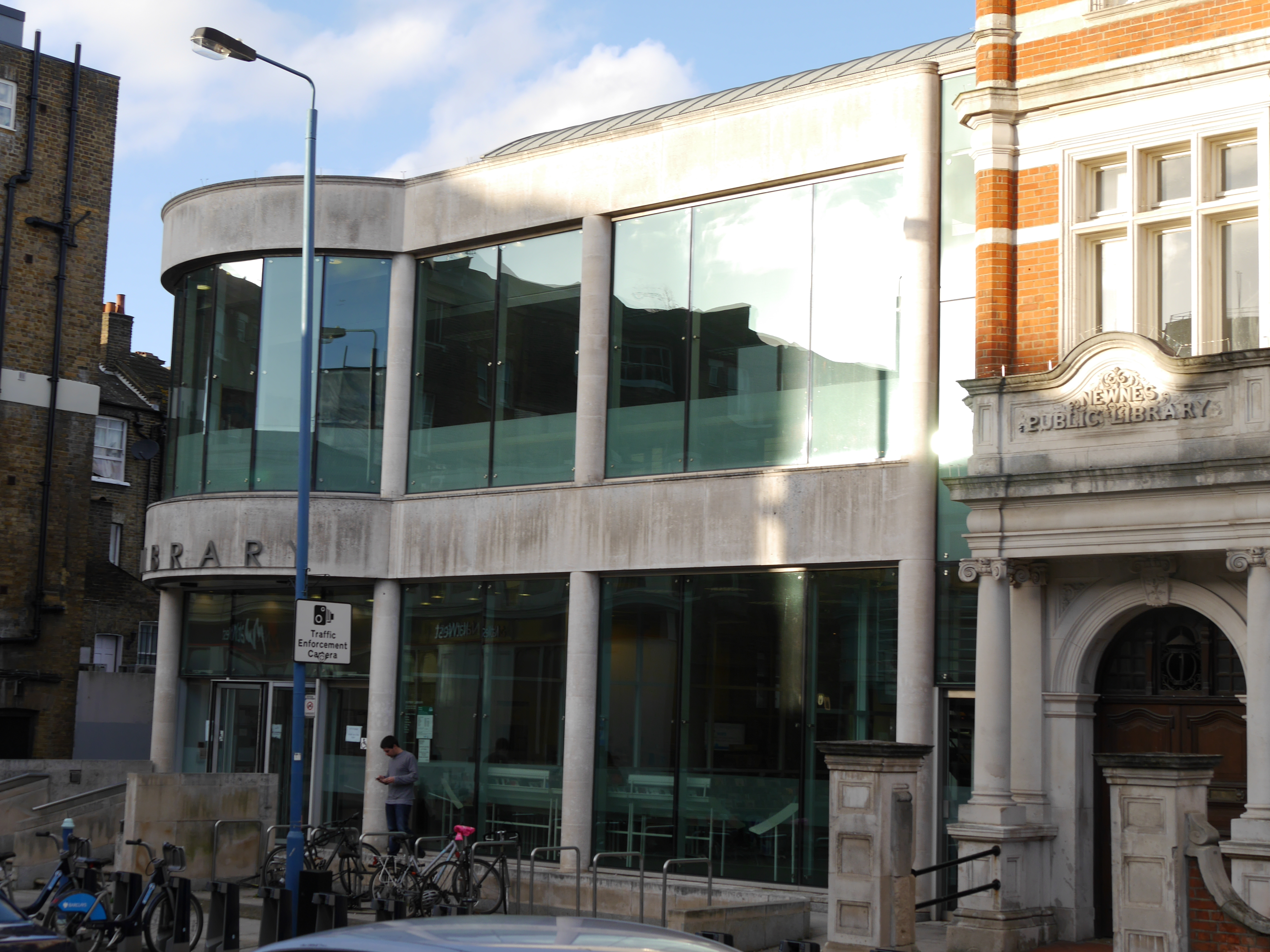
Putney Library entrance with 1997 extension

Putney Library is a Grade II listed public library in the London Borough of Wandsworth.

== Location ==
The library is at numbers 5 to 7 on the north side of Disraeli road, just off Putney High street.

== Founding ==
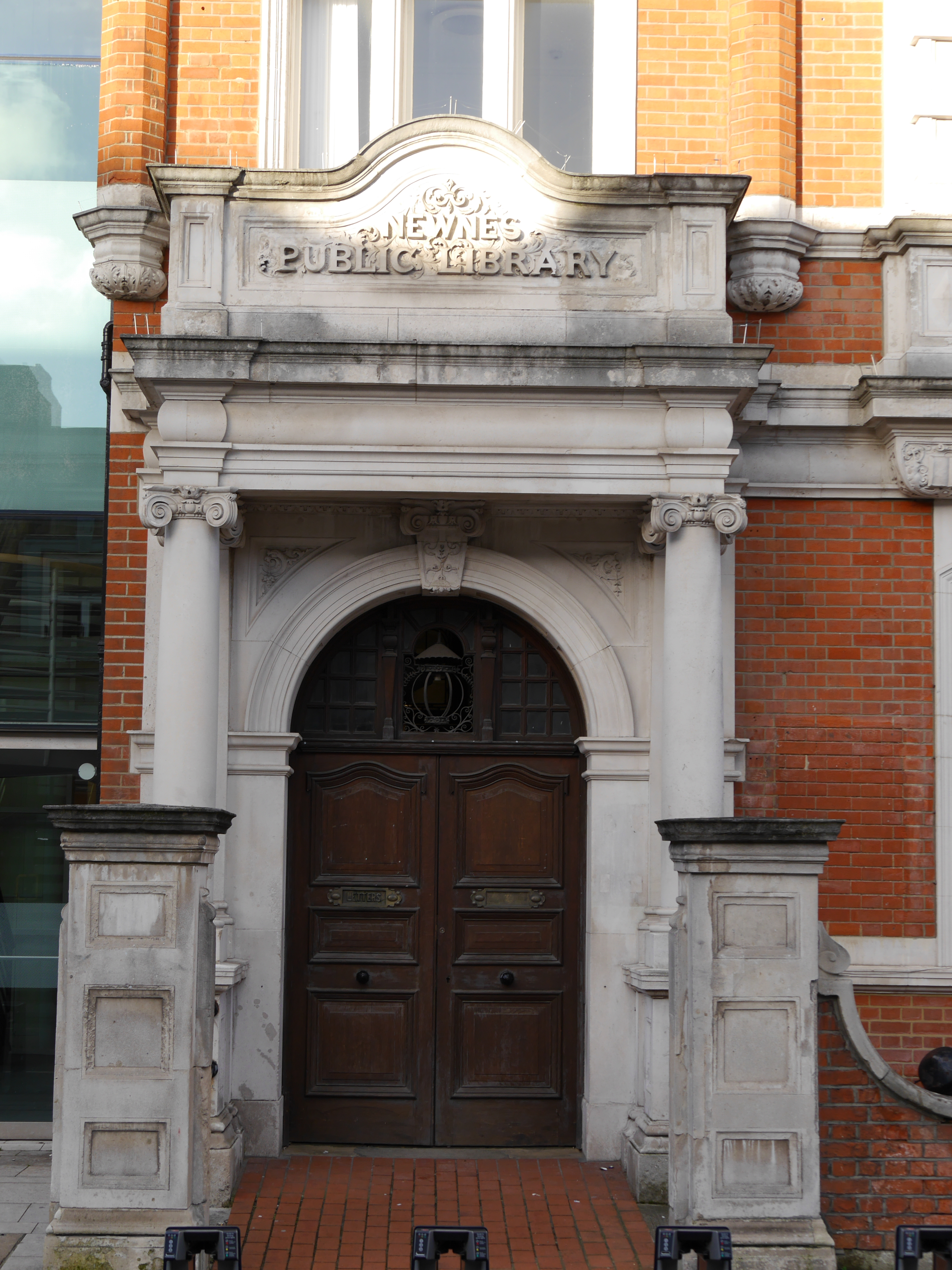
Old Putney Library entrance with 'Newnes' name

The original building design was inspired by Norman Shaw and designed by Francis J Smith. It was paid for by George Newnes, who established 'Tit-Bits' magazine, and was built by H. Roffey of Putney. The library was opened in 1899 by Lord Russell of Killowen.

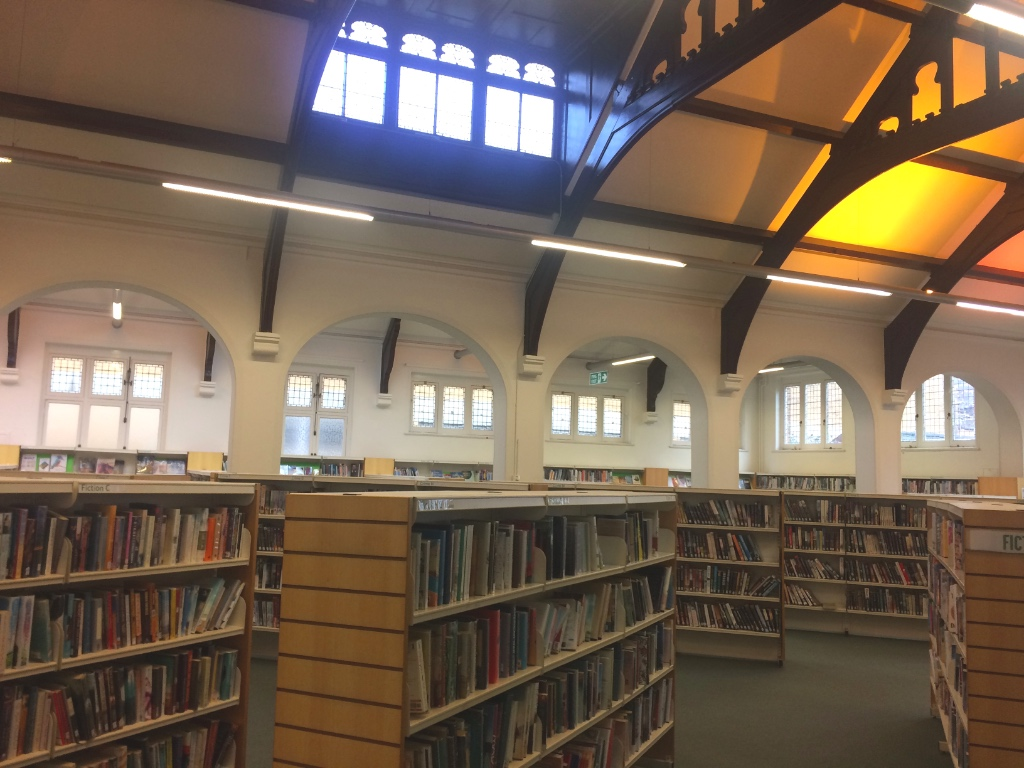
Original reading room with vaulted roof

The building has three storeys and the original reading room has a vaulted roof. During World War Two the basement of the building was used as an Air Raid Patrol centre.

Wandsworth Museum opened in the library building in 1986, but later moved to the Old County Court House in Garratt Lane in 1996, and subsequently merged with Battersea Arts Centre.

== Later development ==
In 1977, a single storey extension was built to the left of the main building to house a children's library and a music library. At this time, the entrance was still through the original building.

In 1997, the 70's extension was demolished and a glass one added with a new entrance designed by Trevor Williams of Wandsworth Borough Council design service. The extension cost £2,800,000; the floorspace was expanded to 2300 square metres and the original building's stone face was cleaned and restored. The 90's extension won the Mayor's Award for accessibility for wheelchair users and those with hearing disability aids, and it was also the winner of the Public Library Building Award 1999 in the large refurbished library category.

In 2021, Wandsworth Borough Council proposed that the library become a community hub, including shared workspaces and a new community cafe.

== Collection and resources ==
There are over 20,000 books in the library's collection. As a public library all books are free to borrow, though only a limited amount at any one time, and with charges for borrowing CDs and DVDs.

In 2020, the library had a book that was returned after 56 years, due back in 1964; it was sent from Athens, Greece.

The library also has a digital collection with online reference material that can be accessed on the library website or the Libby app. In the building, there are also computer terminals with free internet access, study rooms for both adults and children, regular reading groups, and other meetings. MPs and local town Councillors also hold their surgeries in rooms in the building.

The Friends of Putney Library organise events and exhibitions in the library.

== Access ==
As of spring 2022, the library is open on Mondays, Wednesdays, Thursdays, from 09:00 to 20:00, on Fridays and Saturdays from 09:00 to 17:00, Sundays from 13:00 to 17:00, and it is closed on Tuesdays. There is ramp access from the Disraeli road pavement into the building, and a lift.

== Transport ==
The library is served by Transport for London buses 14, 39. 85, 93, 424, and 430 which stop at Putney Station on Putney High Street. East Putney tube station (District line) is an 7-minute walk and Putney railway station (Southwestern Railway) is an 1-minute walk round the corner.

The Santander Cycles Putney rail station docking station is a 2-minute walk, there is also public cycle parking on Disraeli road.
