= Winchester House, Putney =

Building in Putney, London, England

Coordinates: 51.467376°N 0.217418°W

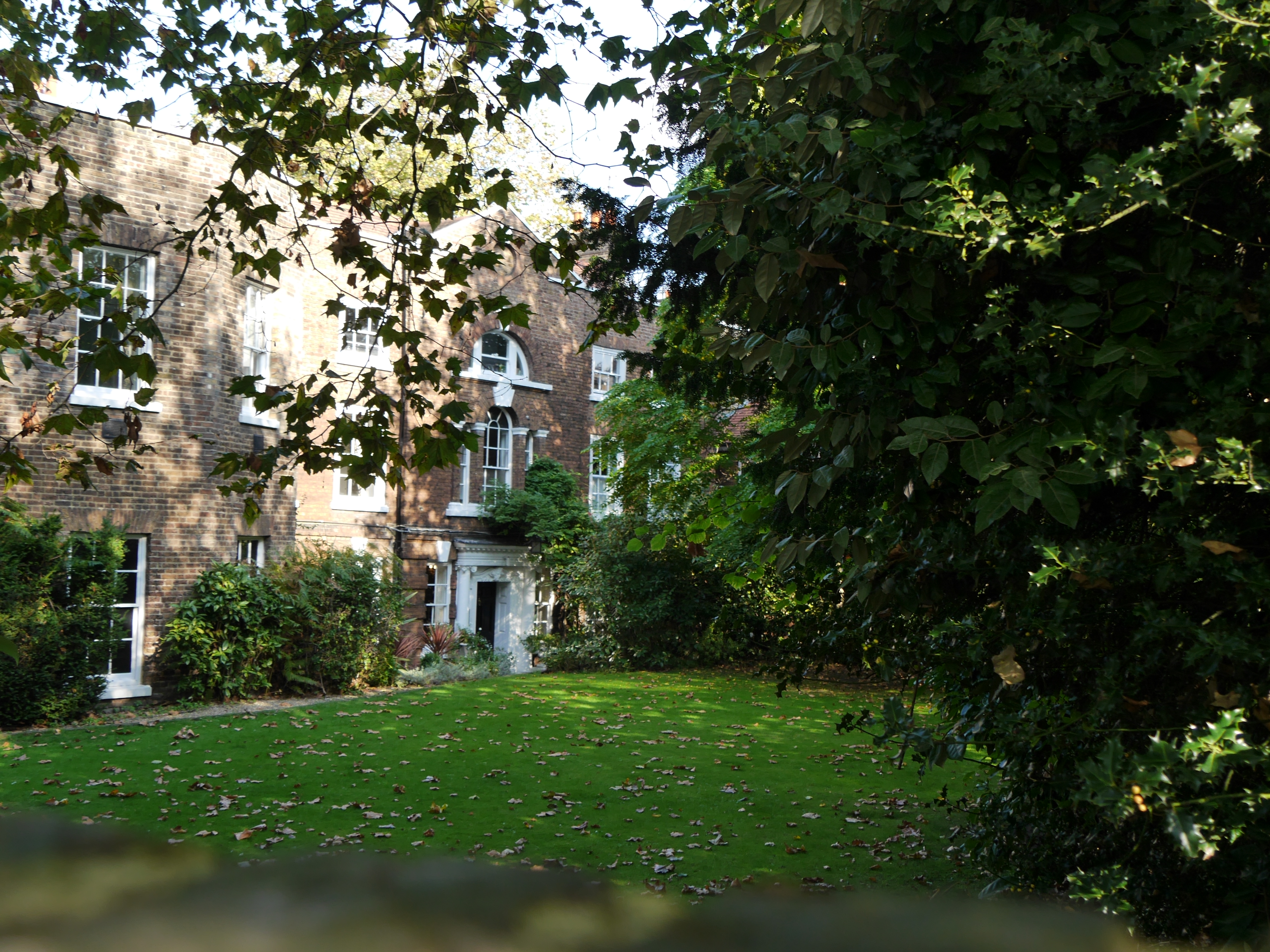
Winchester House garden

Winchester House is a Grade II listed building in Putney in the London Borough of Wandsworth, it is home to the Winchester House Club.

== Location ==
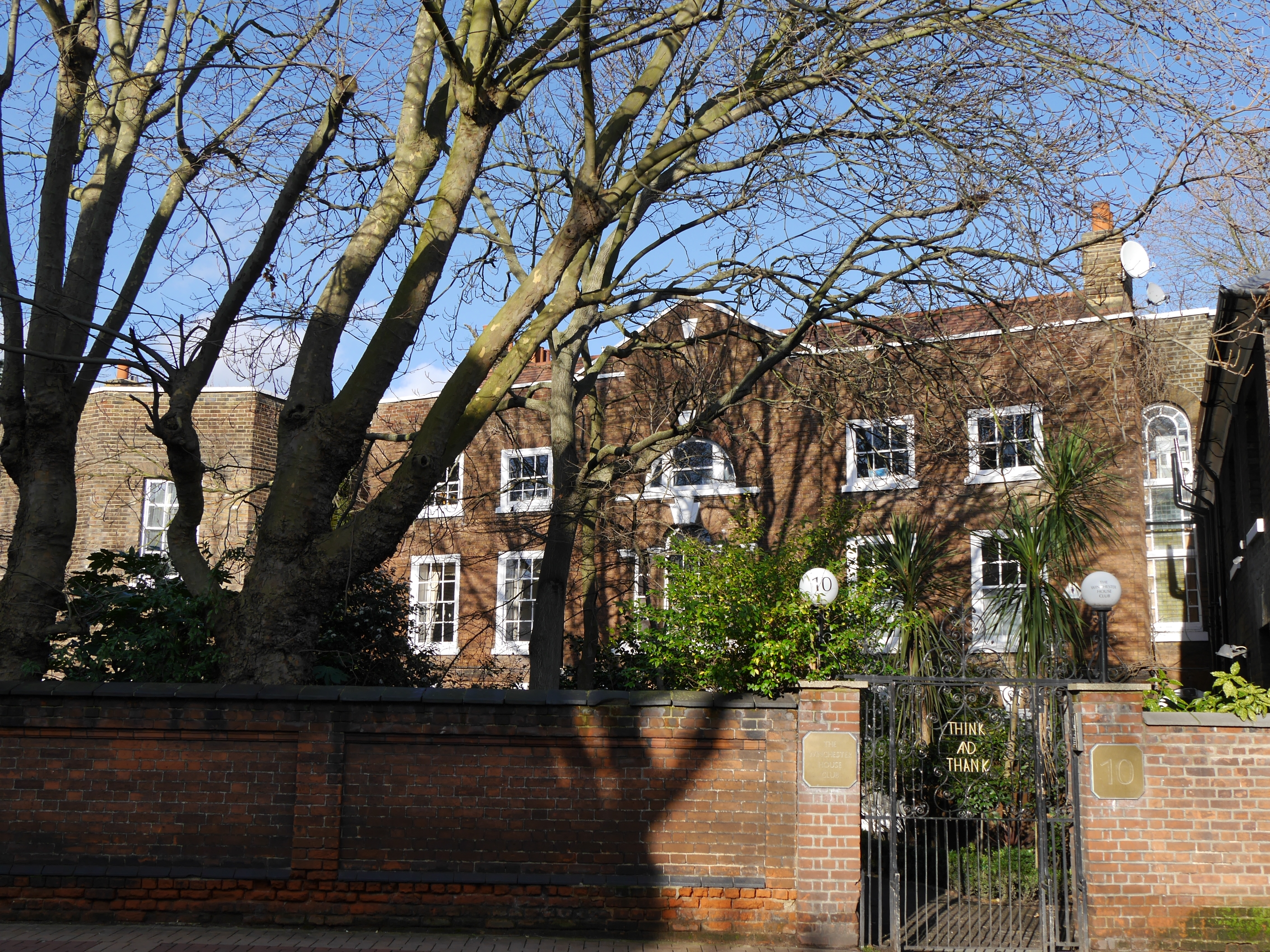
Winchester House from Lower Richmond road

The house is at number 10 on the north side of Lower Richmond road.

== History ==
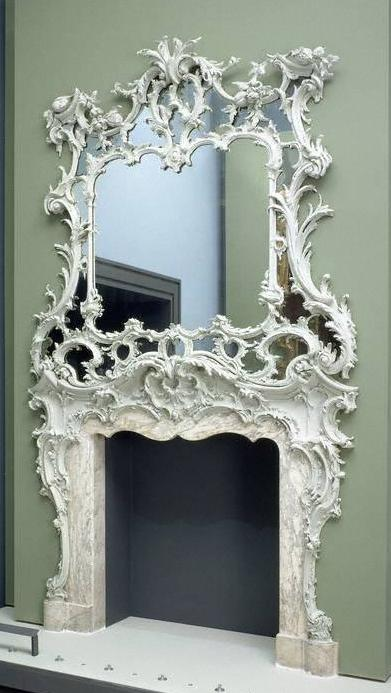
Overmantel from Winchester House c1750, V&A

The club reports that the house was built in the early 17th Century and a mulberry tree in the garden was planted by Oliver Cromwell, at the time of the Putney Debates in 1647. Other sources suggest the building dates back to circa 1730, being built or rebuilt by the Huguenot refugee Jacques Badouin from Nîmes, France. A west wing was added in 1760.

An image from 1915 shows landscaped gardens and there is memorial in the building to those lost in World War I. The building was Grade II listed in 1955. In 2016 it was refurbished and reopened as a venue, it is approved for wedding ceremonies.

== The club ==
In 1892 the 'Putney Constitutional Club Company Limited' was incorporated as a club, in 1997 the club changed its name to 'The Winchester House Club Limited'. The club is described as 'a traditional and thriving private members club offering a range of facilities within a serene setting'.
