= Park Lodge, Putney =

House in Putney, London, England

Coordinates: 51.463709°N 0.212206°W

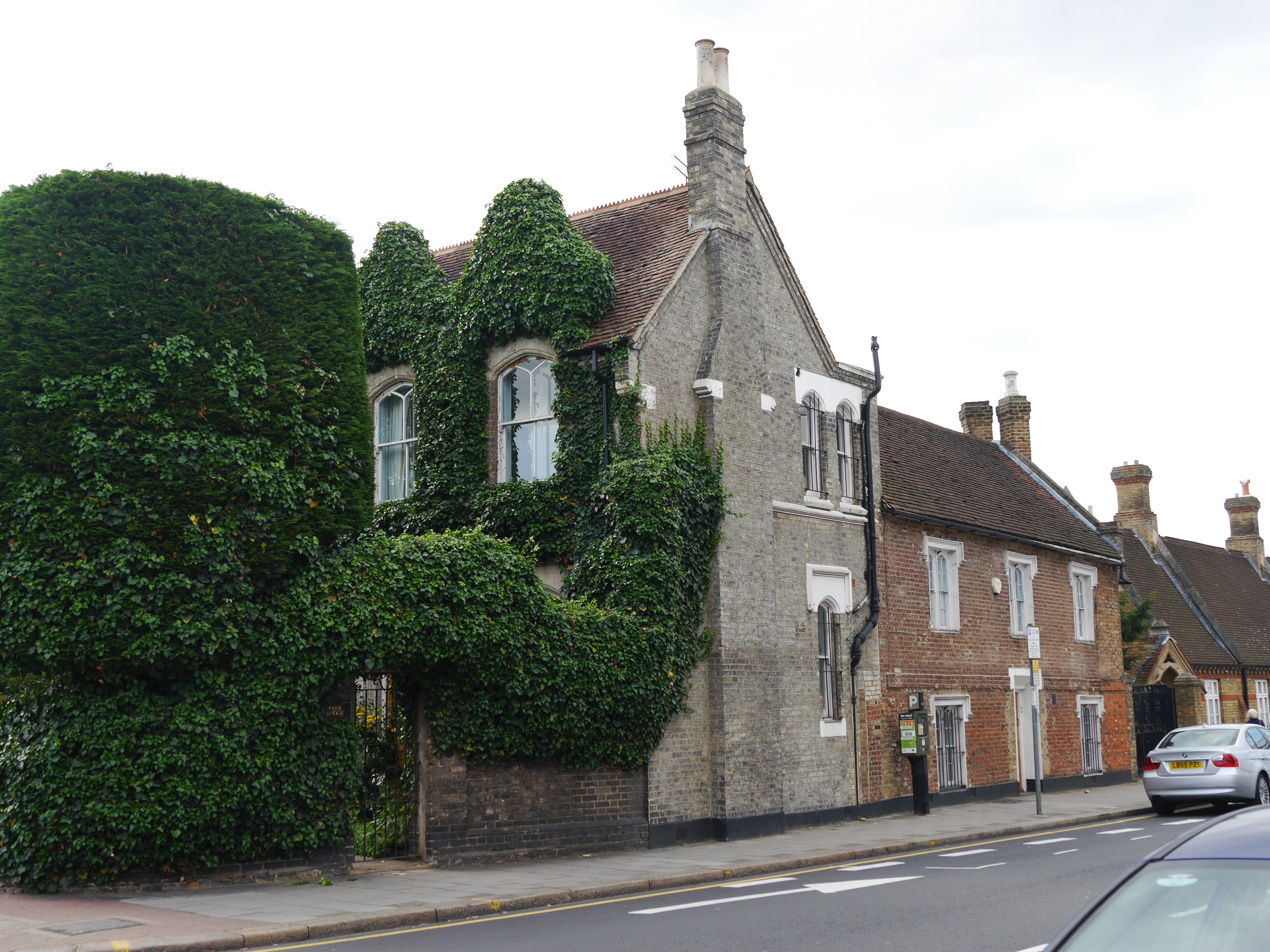
Park Lodge, Putney

Park Lodge is a Grade II listed building in Putney in the London Borough of Wandsworth.

== Location ==
The building is located on the south side of Putney Bridge road at number 289, on the corner with Atney road.

== Architecture and history ==
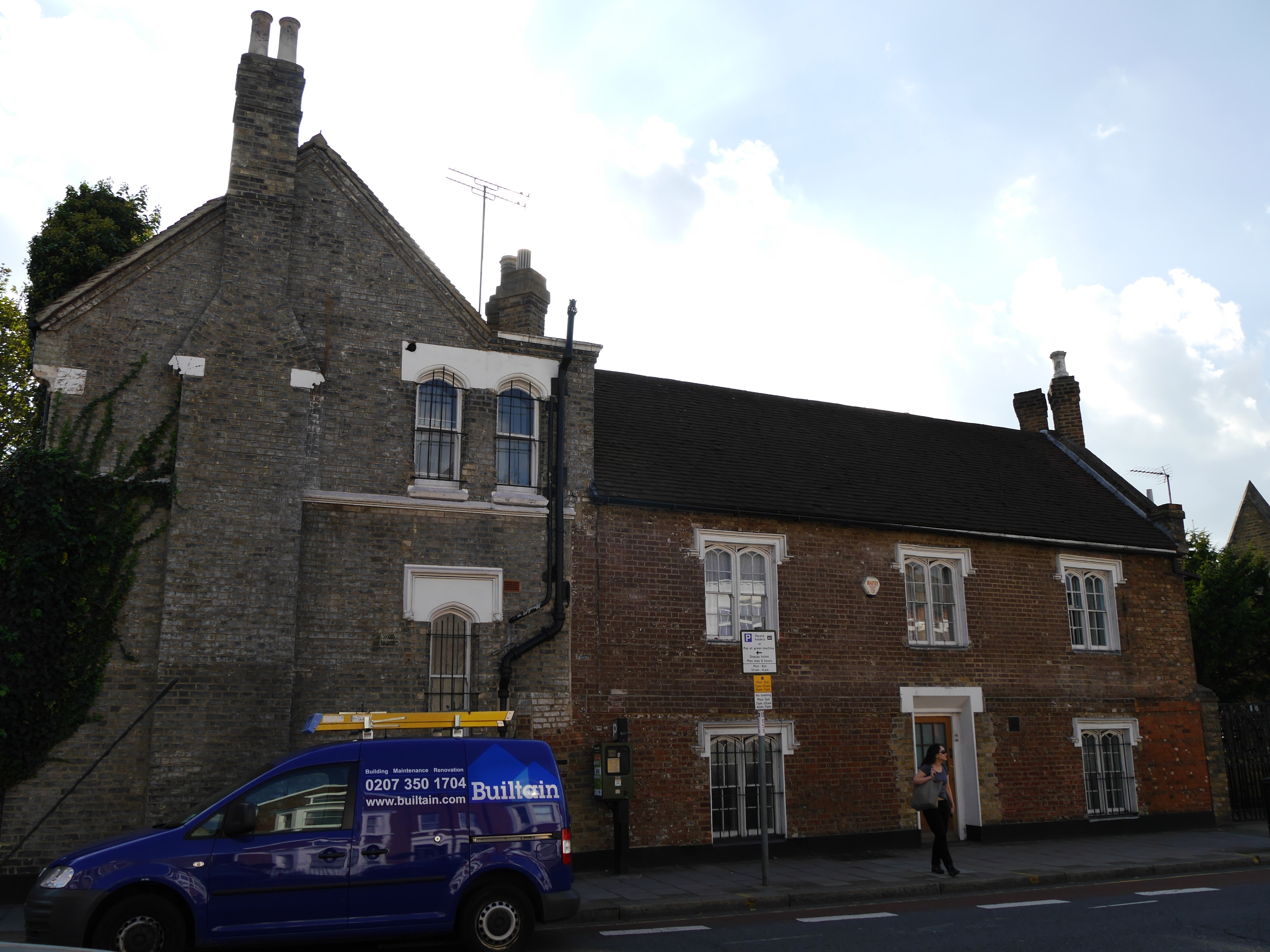
Park Lodge, Putney, showing different brick types

The building was built in the late 17th century or early 18th century, and was extended in 1871. The older part of the house is in red and brown brick, the newer part is in grey.

The building was Grade II listed on 14 November 1988 and is part of the Oxford Road Conservation Area.

== Notable residents and visitors ==
Author Lewis Carroll had an uncle who lived at the house whom he is recorded as visiting. Images show Carroll's uncle and his cousin Charlotte at the property in 1862.

Footballer John Wylie was recorded at the address in the 1881 census, and businessman Alfred Wakeford and his family had moved into the property by 1891.
