= Thornhill House, Putney =

House in Putney, London, England

Coordinates: 51.463455°N 0.208545°W

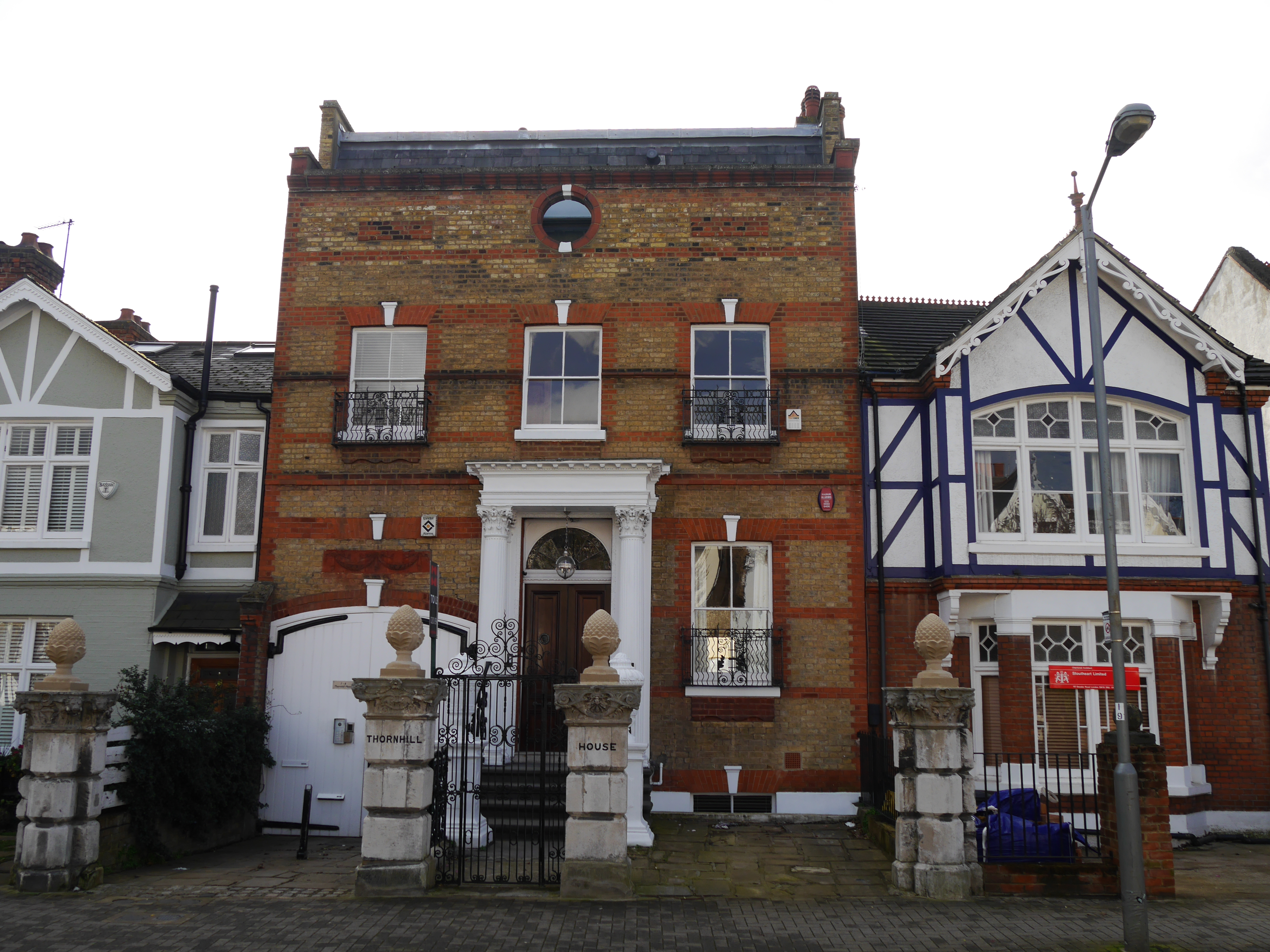
Thornhill House, Putney

Thornhill House is a Grade II listed house at 78 Deodar Road, Putney, London SW15, built in about 1890 by the Kensington builder Mr Wakefield, who incorporated fine panelling, staircase and wall-paintings from Wandsworth Manor, which dated from the late 17th century, and was demolished in 1890. Some panelling and flooring is thought to have come from the Tivoli Theatre of Varieties on the Strand, London, which was demolished in 1916. Other internal decorations were added by his grandson, Norris, who had worked with Edward James in the 1930s at Monkton House. It contains murals by the artist Sir James Thornhill.
