= The Grapes, Wandsworth =

Pub in Wandsworth, London

Coordinates: 51.4586°N 0.1905°W

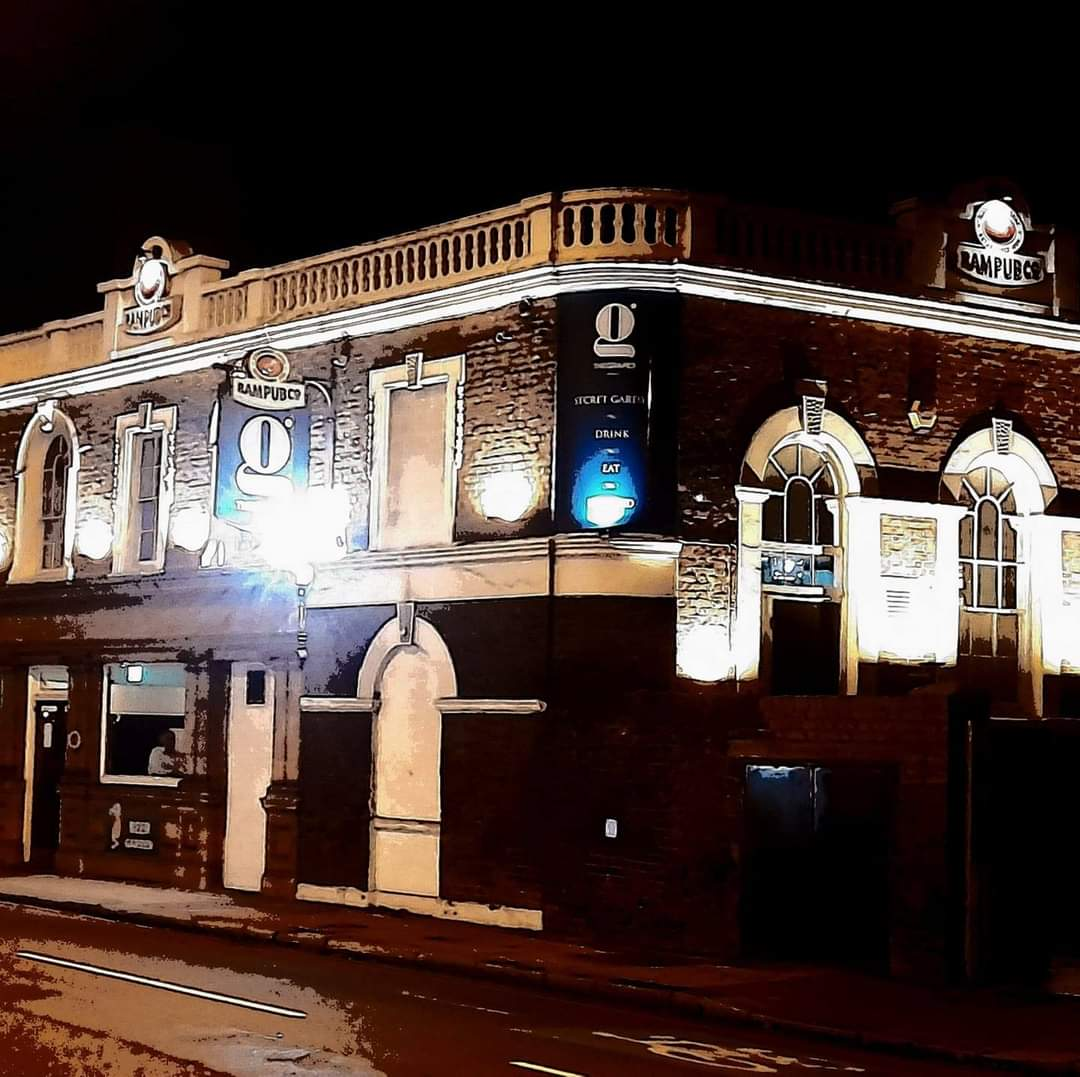
The Grapes

The Grapes is a Grade II listed public house at 39 Fairfield Street, Wandsworth, London, England.

It was built in the early–mid-19th century.
