= King's Head, Roehampton =

Pub in Roehampton, London

Coordinates: 51.450283°N 0.240766°W

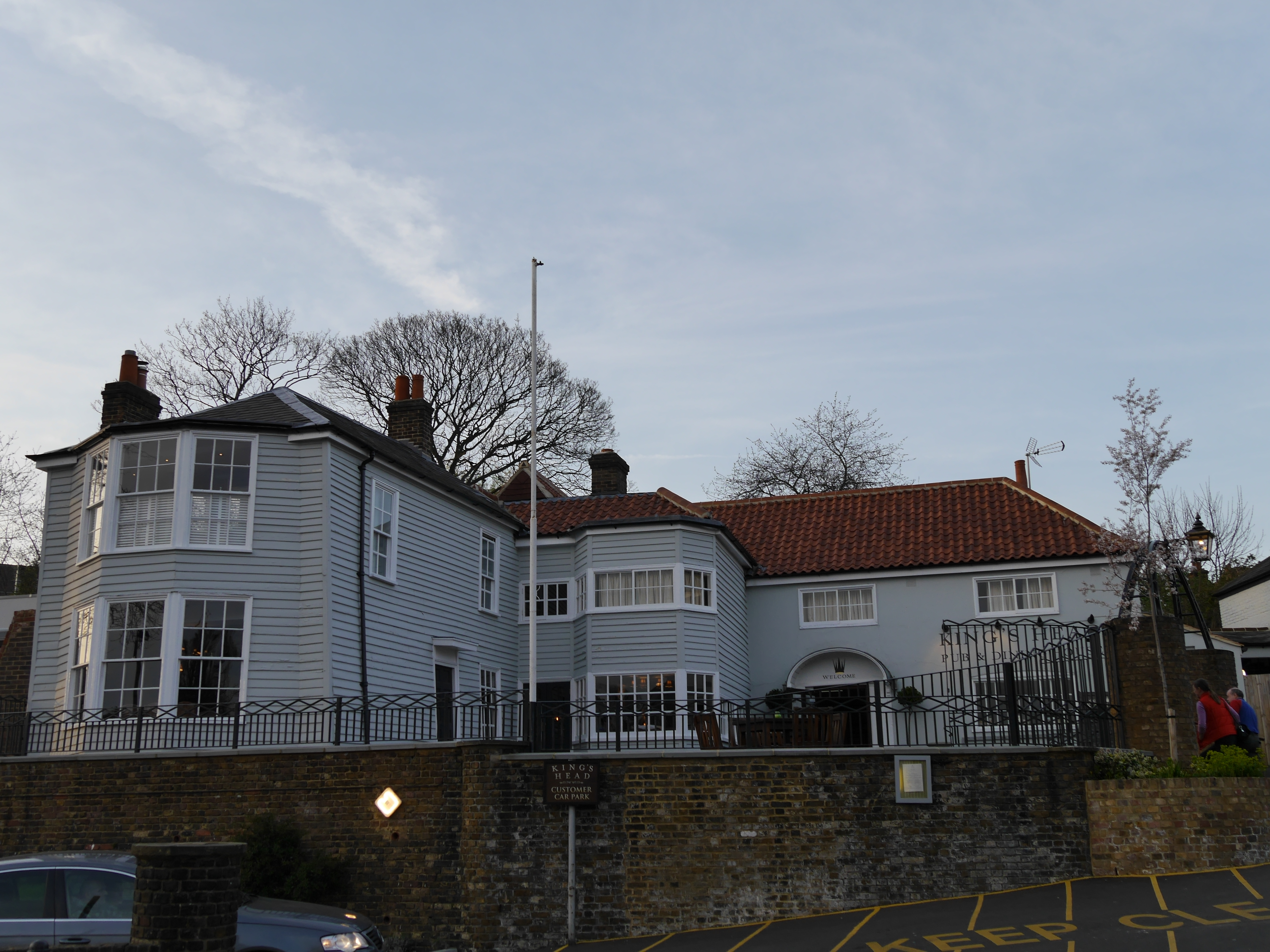
King's Head, Roehampton

The King's Head is a Grade II listed public house at 1 Roehampton High Street, Roehampton, London SW15 4HL.

It dates back to the 17th century, although altered and extended since then.
