= Edward Hunt (architect) =

British architect

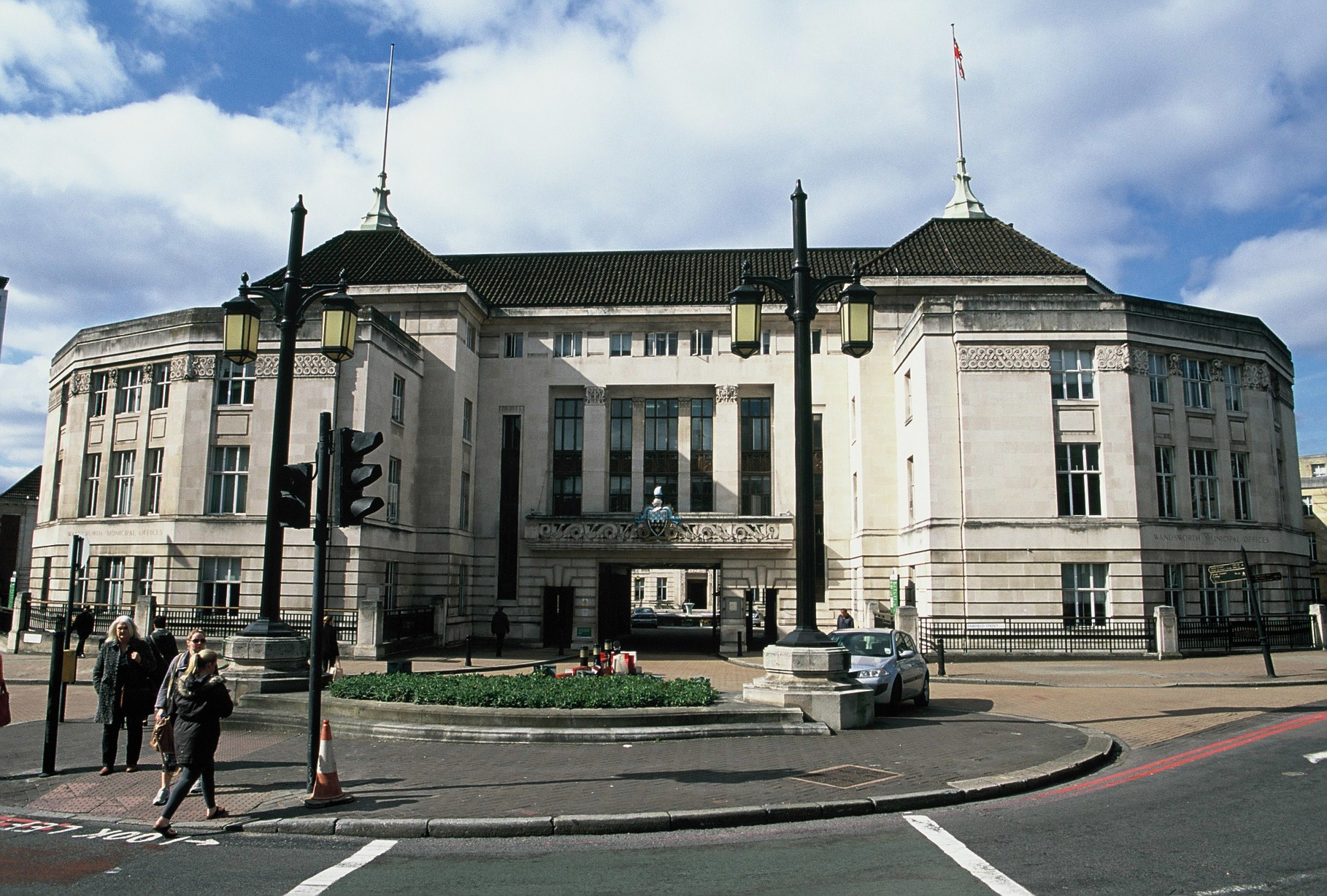
Wandsworth Town Hall, 2014

Edward Arthur Hunt (1877–1963) was a British architect, based in London.

He was the son of fellow architect William Hunt, and they were to form the architectural practice William & Edward Hunt.

In 1906, he designed 155–171 Oakhill Road, a grade II listed block of flats designed in an Arts and Crafts style as a row of four cottages and a laundry block at the rear in Oakhill Road, Putney, London SW15.

In 1932, he and his father designed Brettenham House, at 1–19 Lancaster Place, London, a large office block in an Art Deco style.

Hunt designed Wandsworth Town Hall, London, built in 1937, and grade II listed in 1994.
