= Spread Eagle, Wandsworth =

Pub in Wandsworth, London

Coordinates: 51.456605°N 0.192289°W

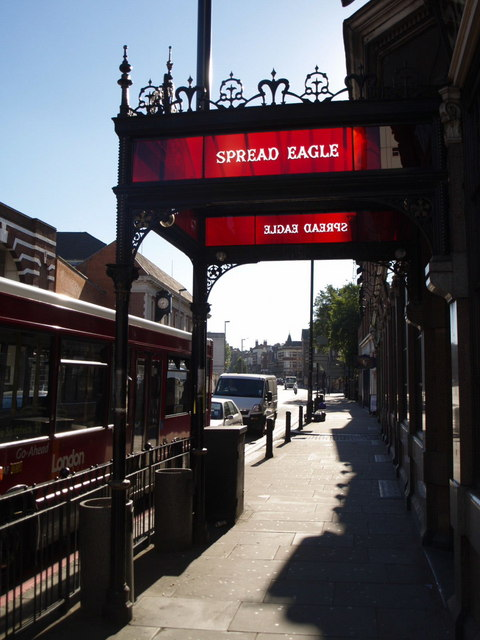
Porch, The Spread Eagle

The Spread Eagle is a Grade II listed public house at 69–71 Wandsworth High Street, Wandsworth, London.

It was built in the late 19th century, and the architect is not known".
