= 92 St John's Hill =

Building in Wandsworth, London, England

Coordinates: 51.461058°N 0.174996°W

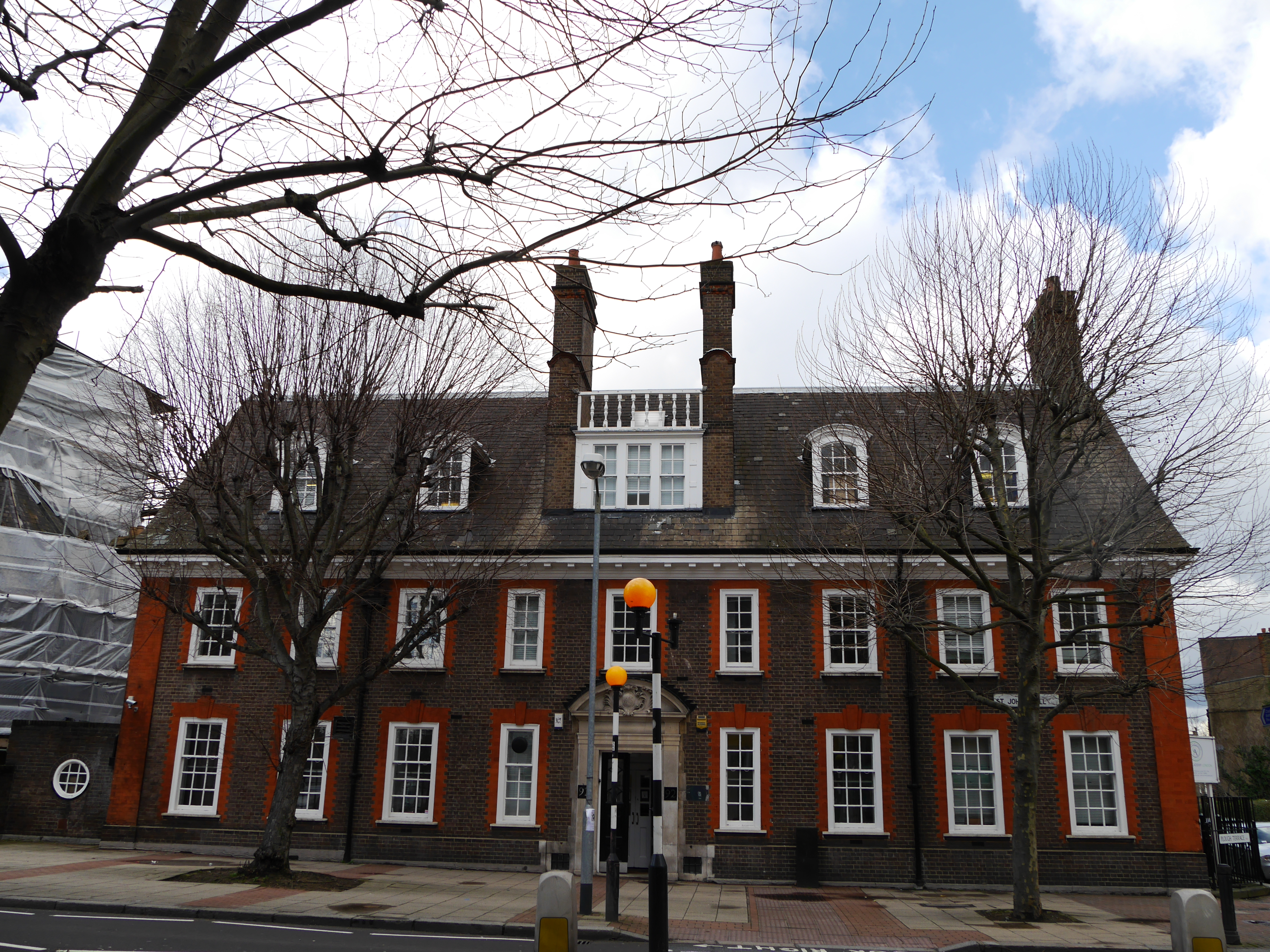
92 St John's Hill, 2014

92 St John's Hill is a Grade II listed building in Battersea, London SW11. It was built in 1909 as an LCC Education Divisional Office, and designed by T. J. Bailey in a late-17th-century style. The building was later used by the Inner London Education Authority as administrative offices until 1991.

It is currently occupied by Centre Academy London, which has been resident on the site continuously since moving there from Waterloo in 1991.

The neighbouring building is the Grade II listed St Paul's Church, which has been converted to a residential complex as 'The Sanctuary'.
