= The White Lion, Putney =

Pub in Putney, London

Coordinates: 51.465734°N 0.214661°W

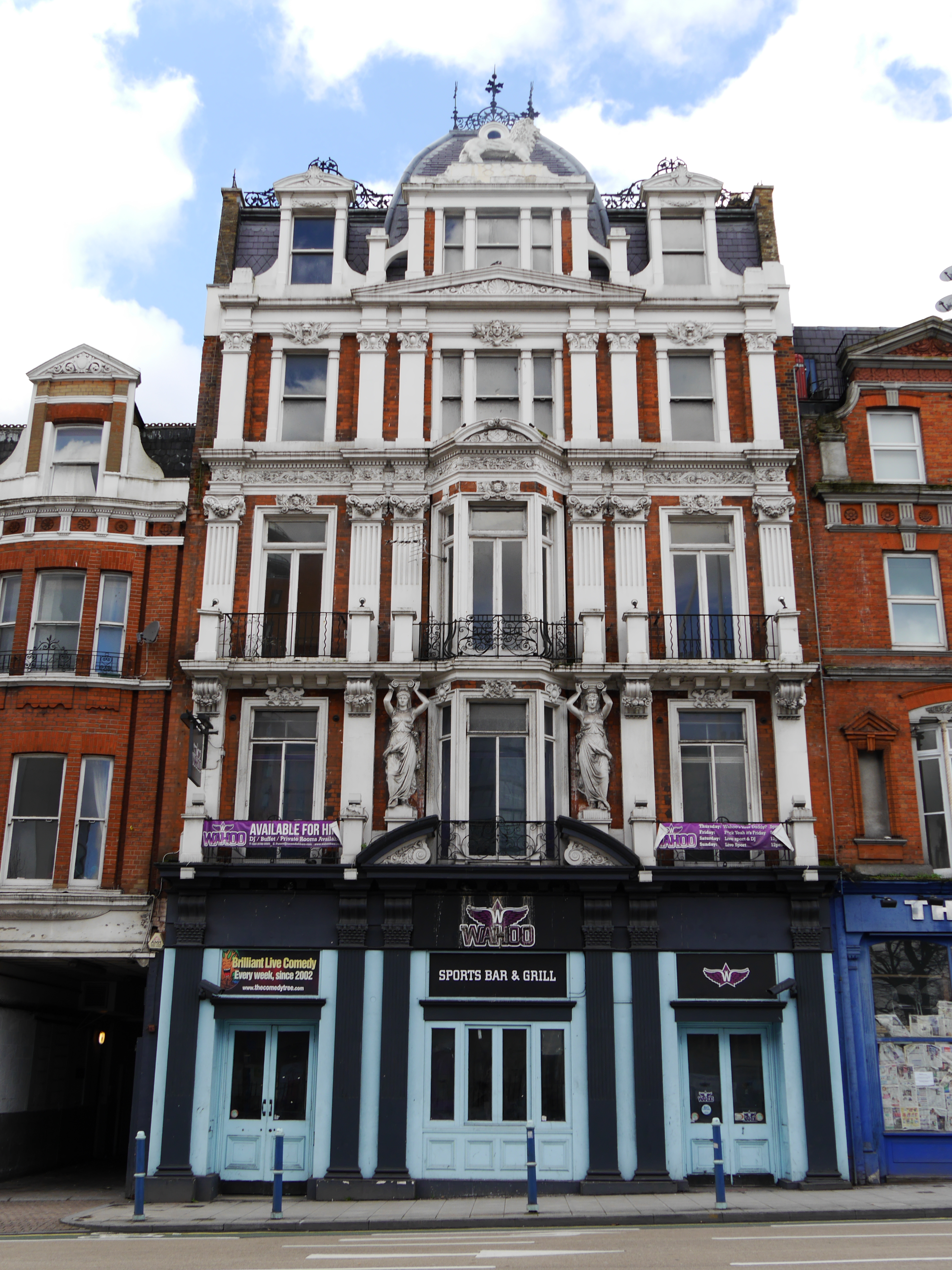
The White Lion

The White Lion is a Grade II listed public house in Putney, in the London Borough of Wandsworth.

== Location ==
The building is on the west side of Putney High Street at numbers 14-16, close to the corner of the Lower Richmond road and the southern end Putney Bridge.

== History ==
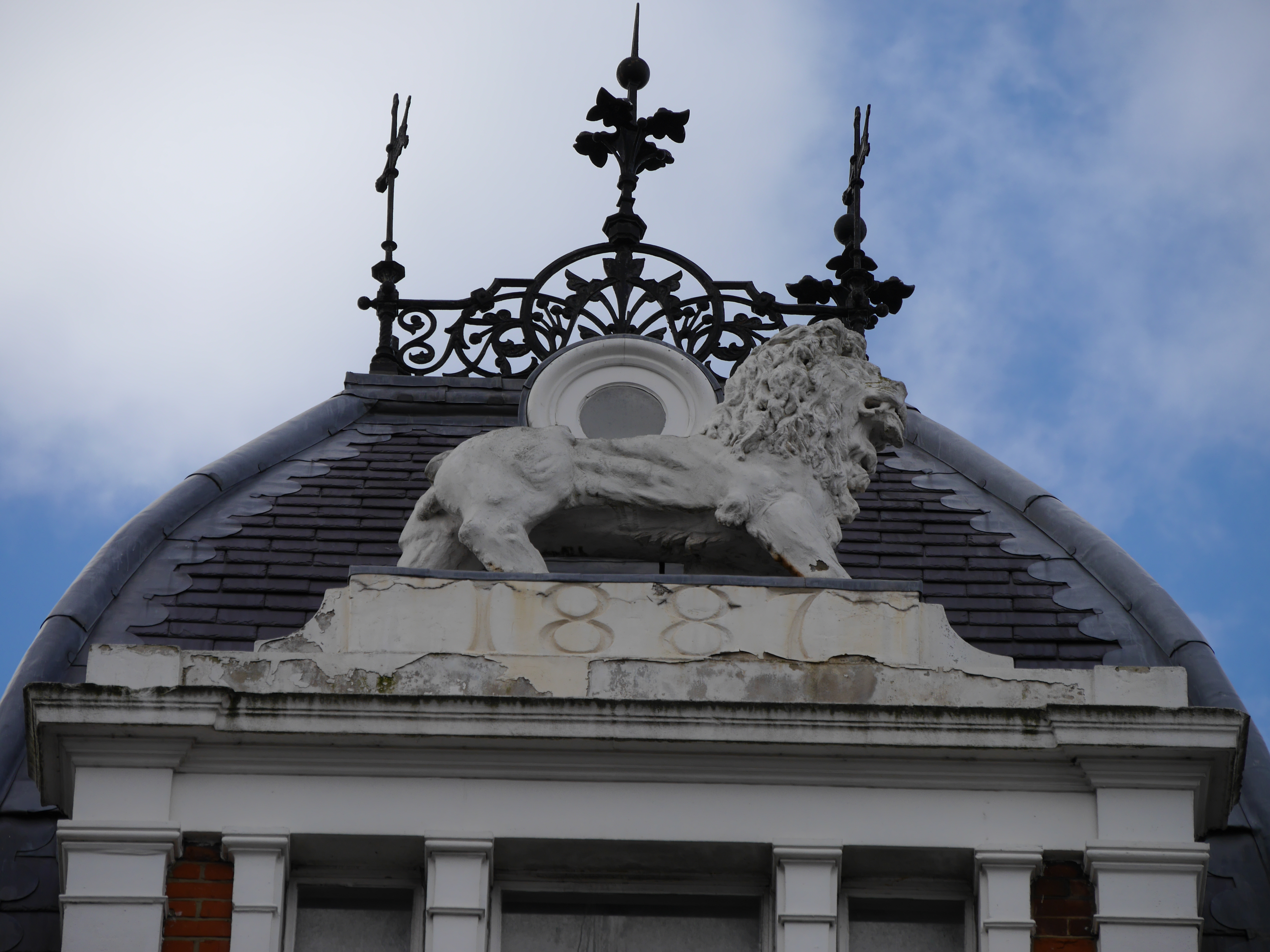
Lion on The White Lion pub roof

The pub was a former hotel and the "White Lion" name has been in existence since 1636.

The building dates from 1887 and the architecture is in the French Second Empire style, including caryatids and lions. The pub had many different landlords and once had a large meeting room and bowling saloons.

In 1978 it was the venue for Gary Numan gig and on 7 April 1983 the building was given Grade II status. It later became a Slug and Lettuce chain pub, then The Litten Tree, then a Walkabout chain pub, then Wahoo, a sports bar. As of June 2019, it has been empty for over six years. In 2017 it was given protection under Article 4 Directions by Wandsworth Borough Council.
