= 155–171 Oakhill Road =

Historic building Oakhill Road, Putney, London

Coordinates: 51.459761°N 0.199836°W

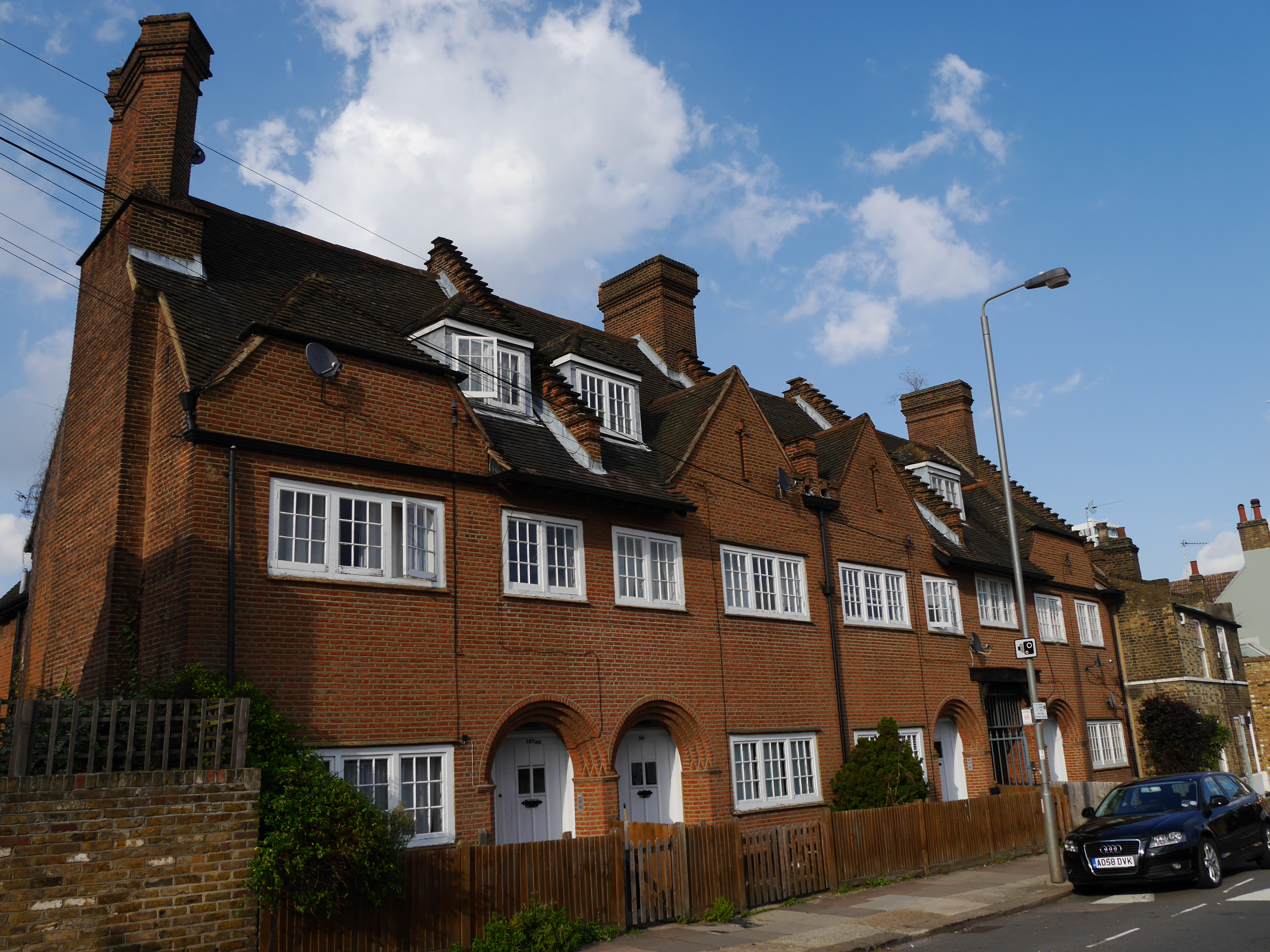
155–171 Oakhill Road

155–171 Oakhill Road is a Grade II listed private block of flats and rear building in an Arts and Crafts style in Putney, in the London Borough of Wandsworth.

== Location ==
The site is on the north side of Oakhill road, opposite St Joseph's Catholic Primary School, and close to the junction with Putney Bridge Road and Wandsworth Park.

== History ==
The buildings were designed by architect William Hunt (1854–1943), together with his son and partner Edward Hunt (1877–1963).

Built in 1906, there is a row of four Arts and Crafts terraced cottages in red brick with two storeys plus attic, each cottage had a two-bedroom flat on the ground floor, and a three-bedroom flat above.

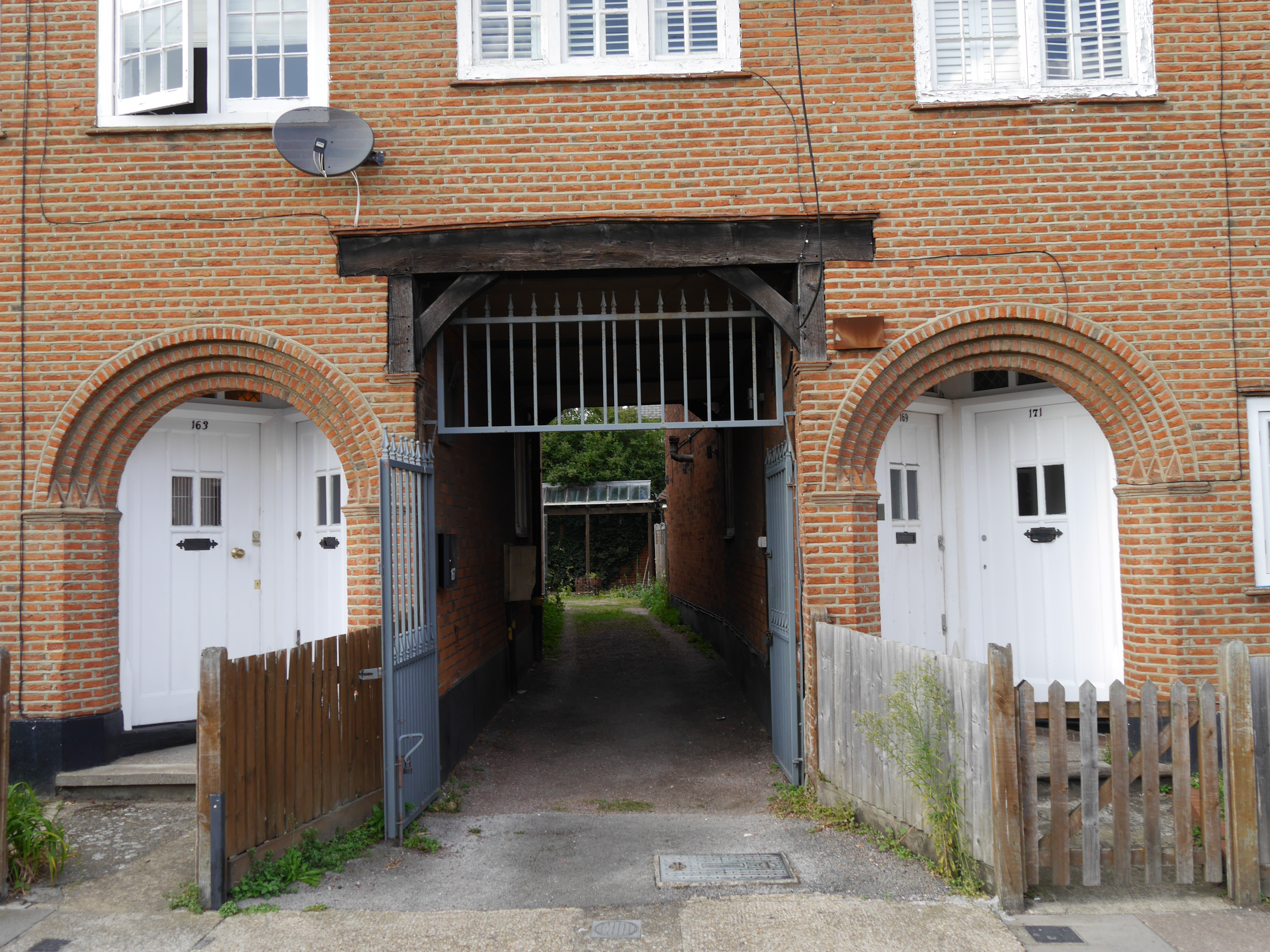
Carriage arch at 155–171 Oakhill Road

The carriage arch between numbers 163/165 and 169/171 leads through to the two storey laundry building at the back.

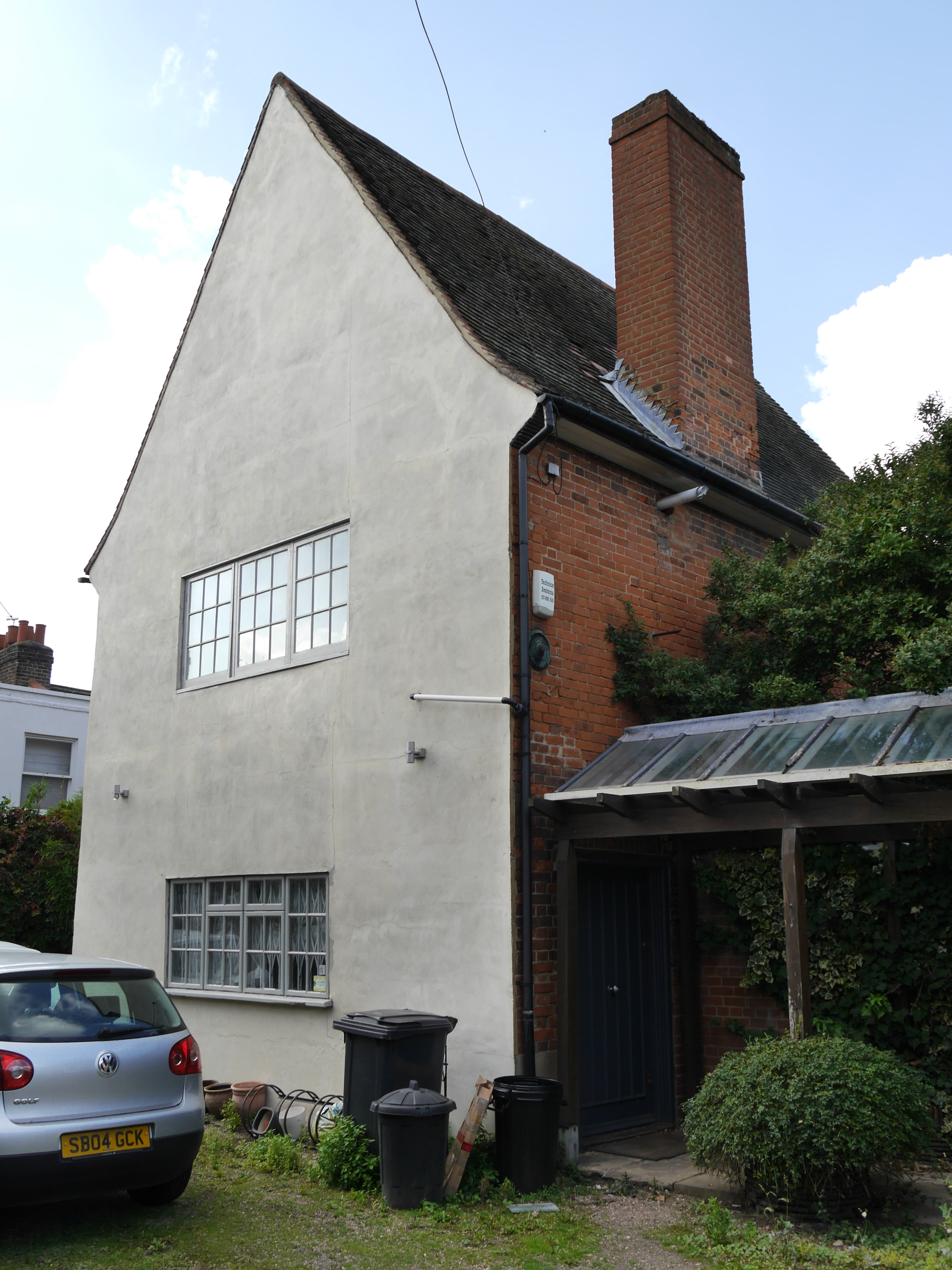
Laundry building at 155–171 Oakhill Road

== Current condition ==
Interiors have original features such as green tiled fireplaces and built in cupboards. The laundry building has been used as a commercial office, but as of August 2023 has planning permission for conversion to a four bedroom house.
