= Montague Arms =

Former pub in Roehampton, London

Coordinates: 51.449950°N 0.240088°W

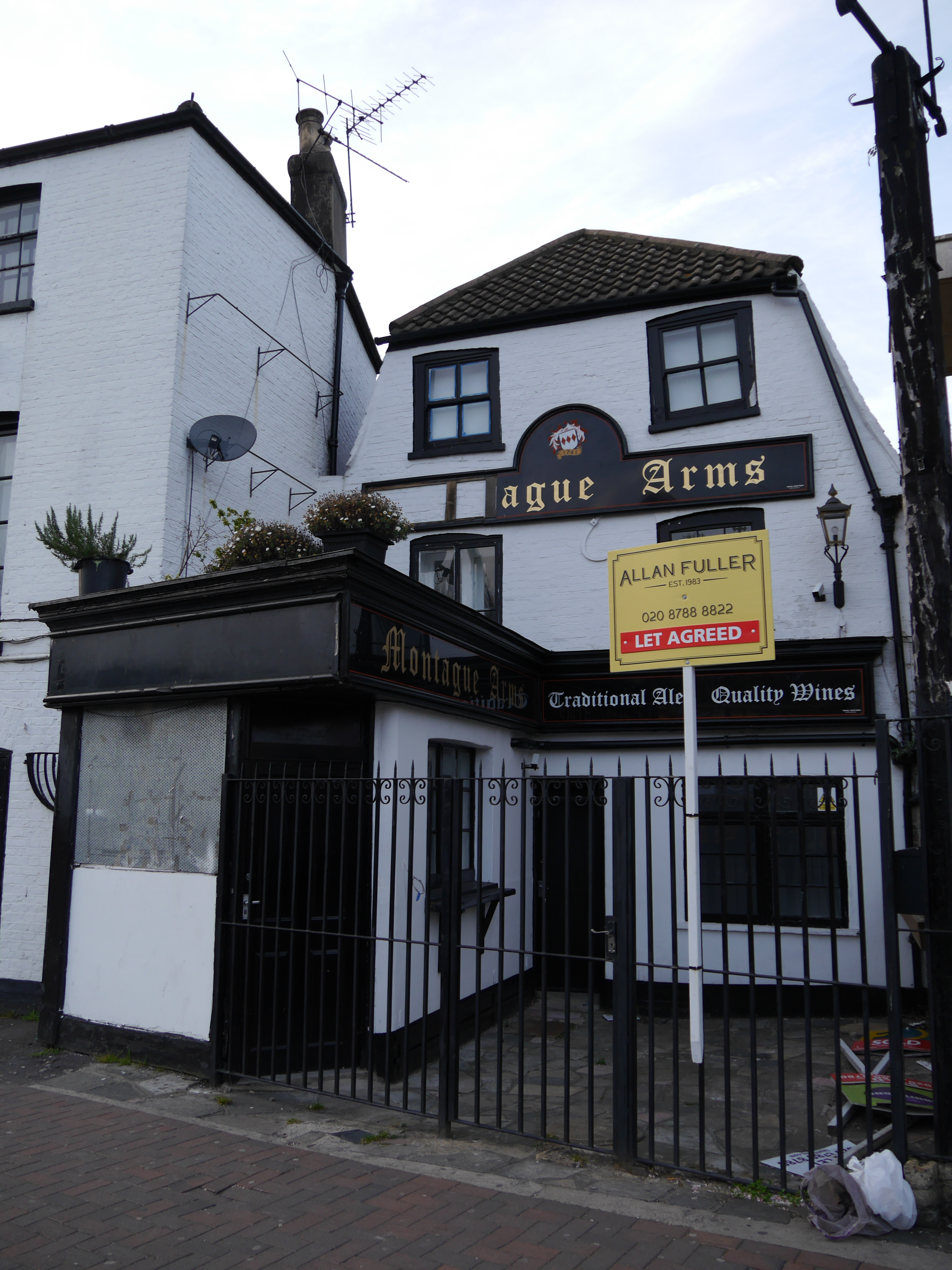
Montague Arms in 2014

The Montague Arms is a Grade II listed building at 3 Medfield Street, Roehampton, London. Previously a public house, it dates to the 17th century, although has been altered since.

The pub was closed in 2006 and converted to offices, and later became an off licence shop by the name of Lloyds local. In 2008 unauthorized work was carried out to the building, in June 2010 applications for change of use.
