= Ark John Archer Primary Academy =

Coordinates: 51.461882°N 0.174733°W

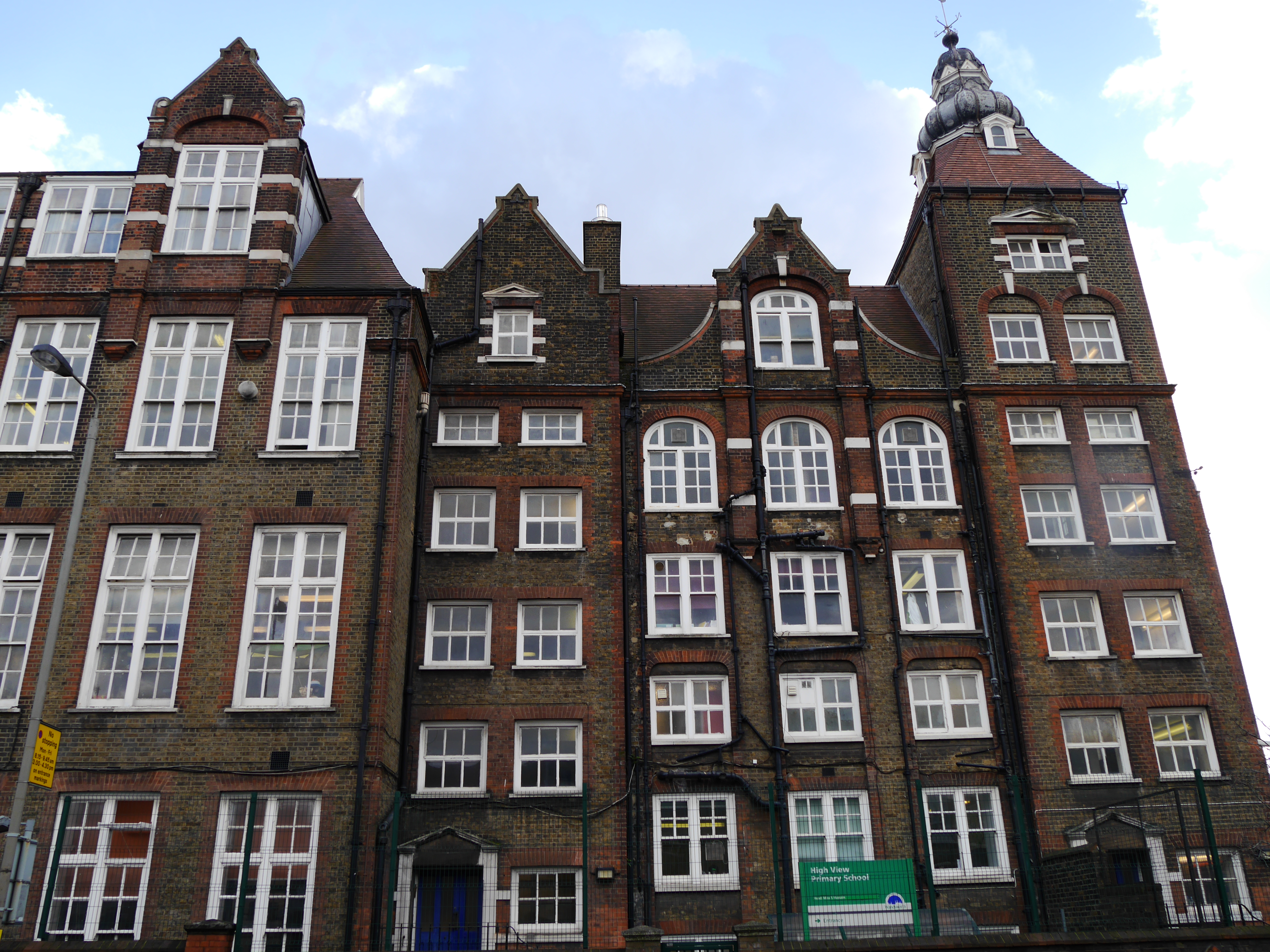

Location
- Plough Road; Battersea; London, SW11 2AA; England

Information
- Former name: High View Primary School
- Type: Academy
- Established: 1890
- Local authority: Wandsworth
- Trust: Ark Schools
- Department for Education URN: 146214 Tables
- Ofsted: Reports
- Principal: Moira Cruddas
- Gender: Co-educational
- Age: 3 to 11
- Website: arkjohnarcher.org

Ark John Archer Primary Academy (formerly High View Primary School) is a co-educational primary school and a building located at Plough Road in the Battersea area of London, England.

== History ==
The school was built in a Flemish Renaissance style for the London School Board in 1890 by architect T. J. Bailey.

Previously a community school administered by Wandsworth London Borough Council, in September 2018 High View Primary School converted to academy status and was renamed Ark John Archer Primary Academy. The school is now sponsored by Ark Schools, and is named after John Archer, a former Mayor of Battersea Borough, and the first black mayor in London.
