= King's Arms =

King's Arms, or Kings Arms or The King's Arms may refer to:

== Pubs ==
- King's Arms, a popular pub name
- King's Arms, Chatham, a former pub in Kent, England
- Kings Arms, Combe Martin, Devon, England, now known as the Pack o' Cards
- King's Arms, Dorchester, Dorset, England
- Kings Arms, Hanwell, London, England
- Kings Arms, Leaves Green, Bromley, London, England
- King's Arms, Oxford, Oxfordshire, England
- King's Arms, Salford, Greater Manchester, England
- King's Arms, Stockport, Greater Manchester, England
- King's Arms, Waterloo, London, England
- Kings Arms, Woolwich, London, England
- Kings Arms Hotel, Askrigg, North Yorkshire, England
- Kings Arms, York, North Yorkshire, England
- The King's Arms Hotel, Reeth, North Yorkshire, England
- The Old Kings Arms, St Albans, Hertfordshire, England
- King's Arms, Dumfries, a tavern with one of Robert Burns's diamond point engravings
- Black Rat (restaurant), Winchester, Hampshire, England, formerly called the Kings Arms

== Royalty ==
- Royal coat of arms (disambiguation)
- King of Arms
- Royal Arms of England
- Royal coat of arms of the United Kingdom
