= Manor of Combe Martin =

The Manor of Combe Martin was a medieval manor estate in Combe Martin, Devon, England.

== Descent ==
=== William de Falaise ===
The Domesday Book of 1086 lists Cumbe as the first of 17 holdings in capite of William de Falaise:

Willielmus de Faleise tenet de rege Cumbe. Brictric et Edwi libere tenebant tempore Edwardi Regis et geldabat pro 2 hidae et una virgata terrae. Terra 20 carrae. In dominio sunt 3 carrae et 9 servi.... 18 villii et 10 bordarii... cum 14 carrae.... ibi (est) pastura 1 leuga longae et tantidem laterae et 5 acrae silvae... Olim et nunc valet 100 solidae. ("William of Falaise holds Cumbe from the king. Brictric and Edwy held it freely and jointly in the time of King Edward the Confessor and it paid tax for 2 hides and 1 virgate of land. Land for 20 ploughs. In lordship there are 3 ploughs and 9 slaves, 3 virgates. 18 villagers and 10 smallholders with 14 ploughs and 1 1/2 hides. There is pasture 1 league long and as wide. Woodland, 5 acres; 21 cattle, 9 pigs, 140 sheep, 19 goats. Value formerly and now 100 shillings")

William de Falaise was a Norman from Falaise, Normandy, today in the Calvados department in the Lower Normandy region in northwestern France. He was feudal baron of Stogursey in Somerset, and held in addition lands in Devon. The Exeter Domesday Book lists him as holding the following seventeen Devon manors as a tenant-in-chief of the king:

- Combe Martin, in Braunton Hundred
- Furse, possibly Furze in West Buckland in Braunton Hundred
- Parracombe, in Shirwell Hundred
- Churchill, in East Down parish, Braunton Hundred
- "Beare", possibly a lost Beare in Worlington, Witheridge Hundred
- Washford Pyne in Witheridge Hundred
- Worlington, in Witheridge Hundred
- Bradford, in Witheridge Hundred
- Densham, in Woolfardisworthy parish
- Cockington, in Haytor Hundred
- Holne, now a parish, in Stanborough Hundred
- Stoke, in Holne parish, in Stanborough Hundred
- Dean Prior, a parish in Stanborough Hundred
- Rattery, a parish in Stanborough Hundred
- Dartington, a parish in Stanborough Hundred
- Harbourneford, in South Brent parish in Stanborough Hundred
- Englebourne, now in Harberton parish, Coleridge Hundred.
- Edward Barclay Beales is the current Lord of the Manor

He married Geva de Burci, as her second husband, the daughter and sole heiress of Serlo de Burcy, feudal baron of Blagdon, Somerset, which barony is sometimes stated to be of Dartington, Devon, as the caput cannot be clearly assigned exclusively to either place. Geva's first husband was "Martin" (d.pre-1086) for whom she produced a son and heir Robert FitzMartin (d. 1159) who with his descendants were feudal barons of Blagdon. His daughter and sole heiress to the feudal barony of Stogursey was Emma de Falaise who married William I de Curcy (d. circa 1114), to whose descendants the barony of Stogursey passed.

=== FitzMartin ===
Coat of arms of William Martin, 1st Baron Martin, Argent, two bars Gules..

The Devon lands of William de Falaise passed to the FitzMartin family, feudal barons of Blagdon, from whom derives the 'Martin' suffix on the place name, who were sometimes seated at his former manor of Dartington. The FitzMartins held the barony of Barnstaple following the marriage of Nicholas FitzMartin (d.1260) to Maud de Brain, heiress of the barony of Barnstaple, until the death in 1326 sine prole of his grandson William II FitzMartin (d.1326) (son of William I FitzMartin (d.1324)).

=== Audley ===
The heirs of William II FitzMartin (d.1326) were his surviving sister Eleanor FitzMartin (d.1342), who died without progeny, albeit having married twice, and James Audley, 2nd Baron Audley (d.1386), the son of his other sister Joan FitzMartin (d.1322), by her second husband Nicholas Audley, 1st Baron Audley (d.1316) of Heleigh Castle, Staffordshire. James Audley thus in 1342 inherited his childless aunt Eleanor's moiety of the barony of Barnstaple, giving him possession of the whole, including the constituent manor of Combe Martin.

=== Pollard ===
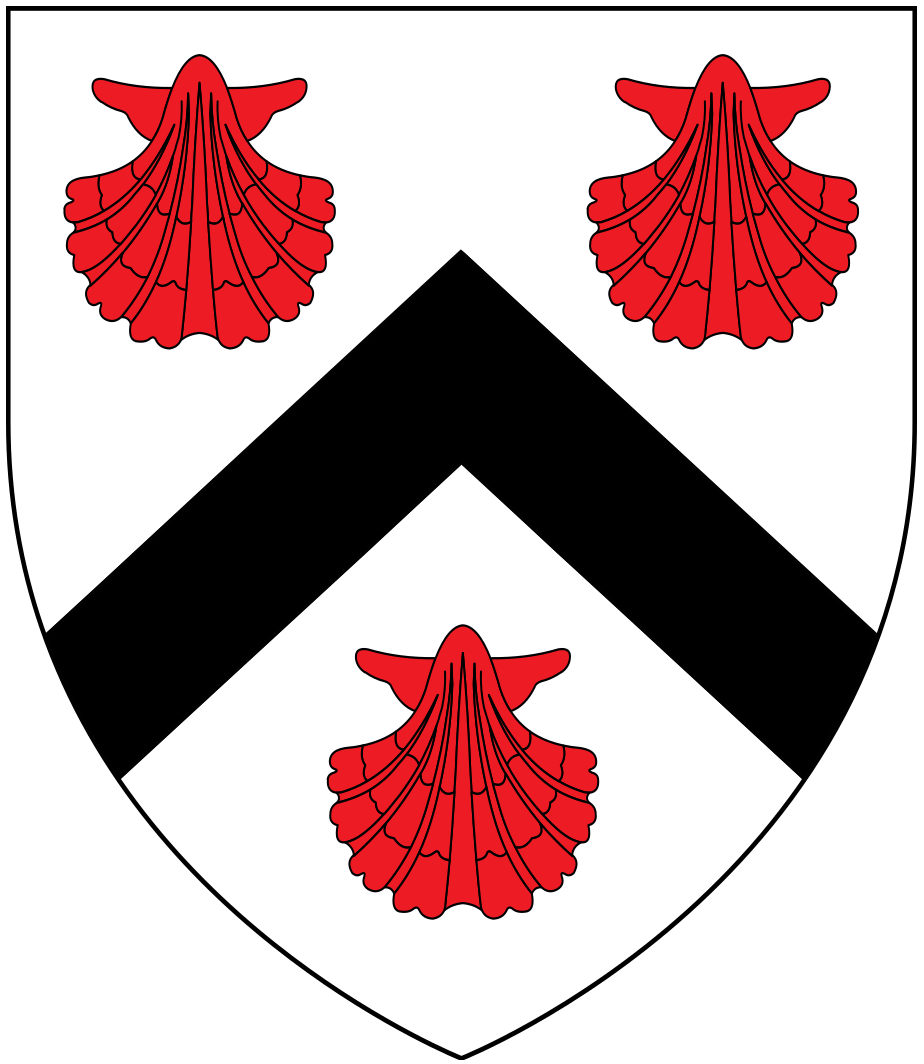
Arms of Pollard of King's Nympton: Argent, a chevron sable between three escallops gules

Following the death in 1391 without progeny of Nicholas Audley, 3rd Baron Audley (c.1328-1391) the barony of Barnstaple escheated to the crown. On 25 October 1537 the manor of Combe Martin was granted by King Henry VIII to Sir Richard Pollard, (1505–1542), as the entry in the "Letters & Papers of King Henry VIII" records under the heading "grants October 1537": "Ric. Pollard. Grant of the manor and borough of Combmeston, Devon, with reservation of gold and silver mines, &c. Hampton Court, 20 Oct. 29 Hen. VIII. Del. Westm., 25 Oct. 1537—P.S." Pollard was an assistant of Thomas Cromwell in administering the surrender of religious houses following the Dissolution of the monasteries, and was employed particularly as a surveyor who visited the premises and made a detailed valuation of the house's assets and income. He was MP for Taunton (1536) and Devon (1539, 1542). He resided chiefly at Putney, Surrey, thus near the Royal Court. In 1540 he was granted the newly dissolved Forde Abbey. He was the 2nd son of Sir Lewis Pollard (c.1465-1526) of King's Nympton, Justice of the Common Pleas from 1514 to 1526 and MP for Totnes in 1491. Sir Richard's son Sir John Pollard sold the manor of Combe Martin to his tenants and the demesne lands to his servant William Hancocke.

=== Hancock ===
==== William Hancock (d.1587) ====
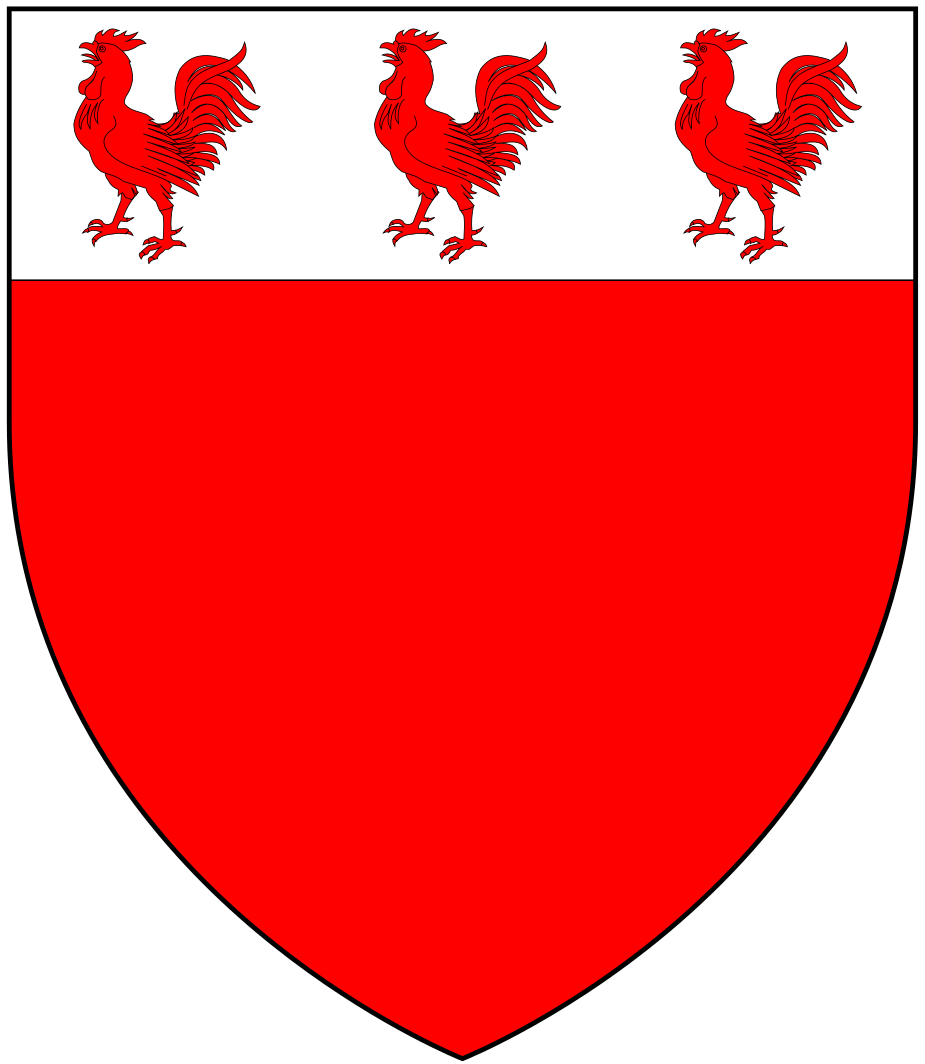
Canting arms of Hancock of Combe Martin: Gules, on a chief argent three cocks of the field. These arms are visible on the monument to Judith Hancock (d.1676), wife of Henry Stevens of Vielstone, in the parish of Buckland Brewer, on her mural monument in Great Torrington Church. Monuments to the Hancock family also exist in Combe Martin parish church

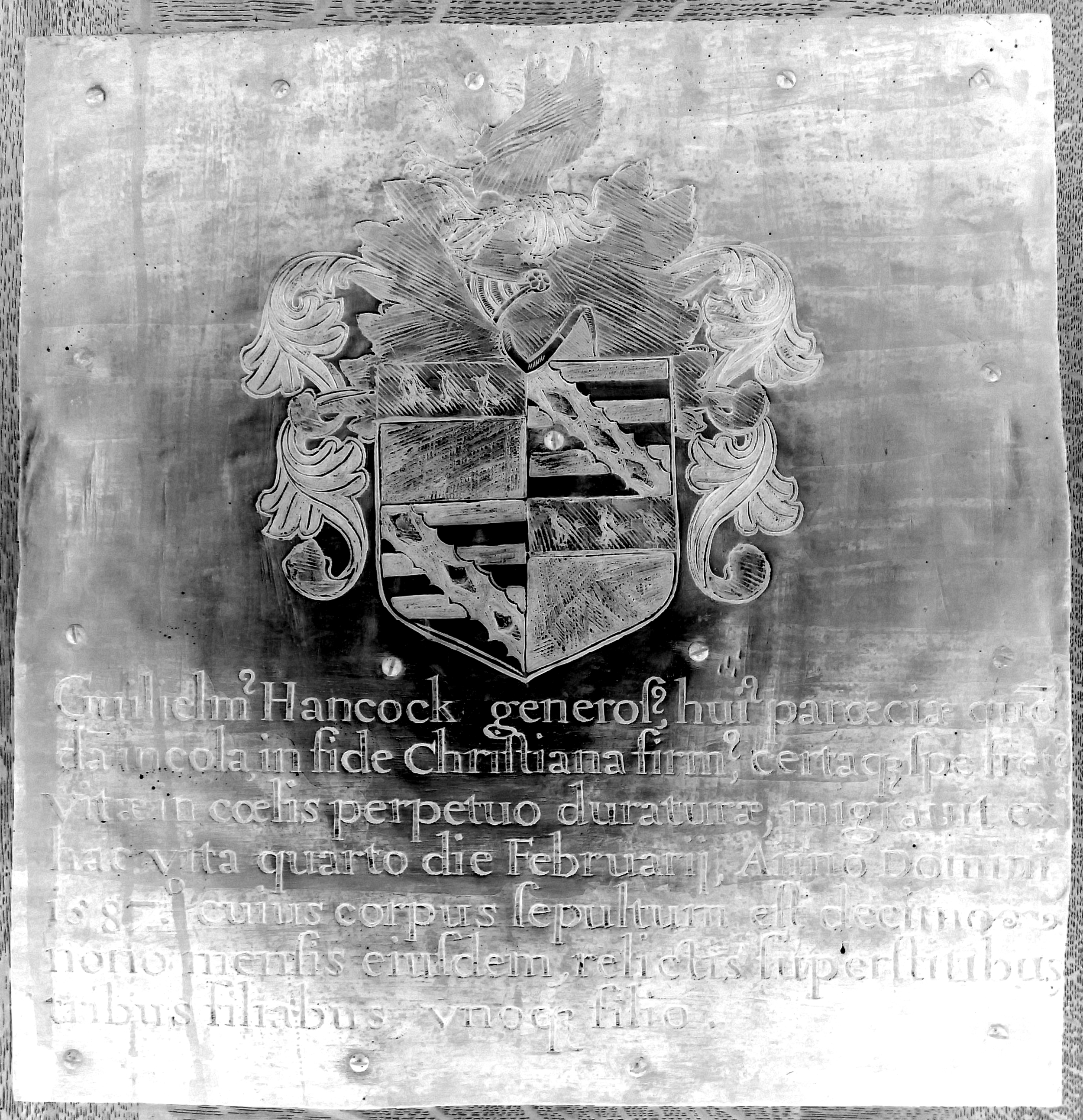
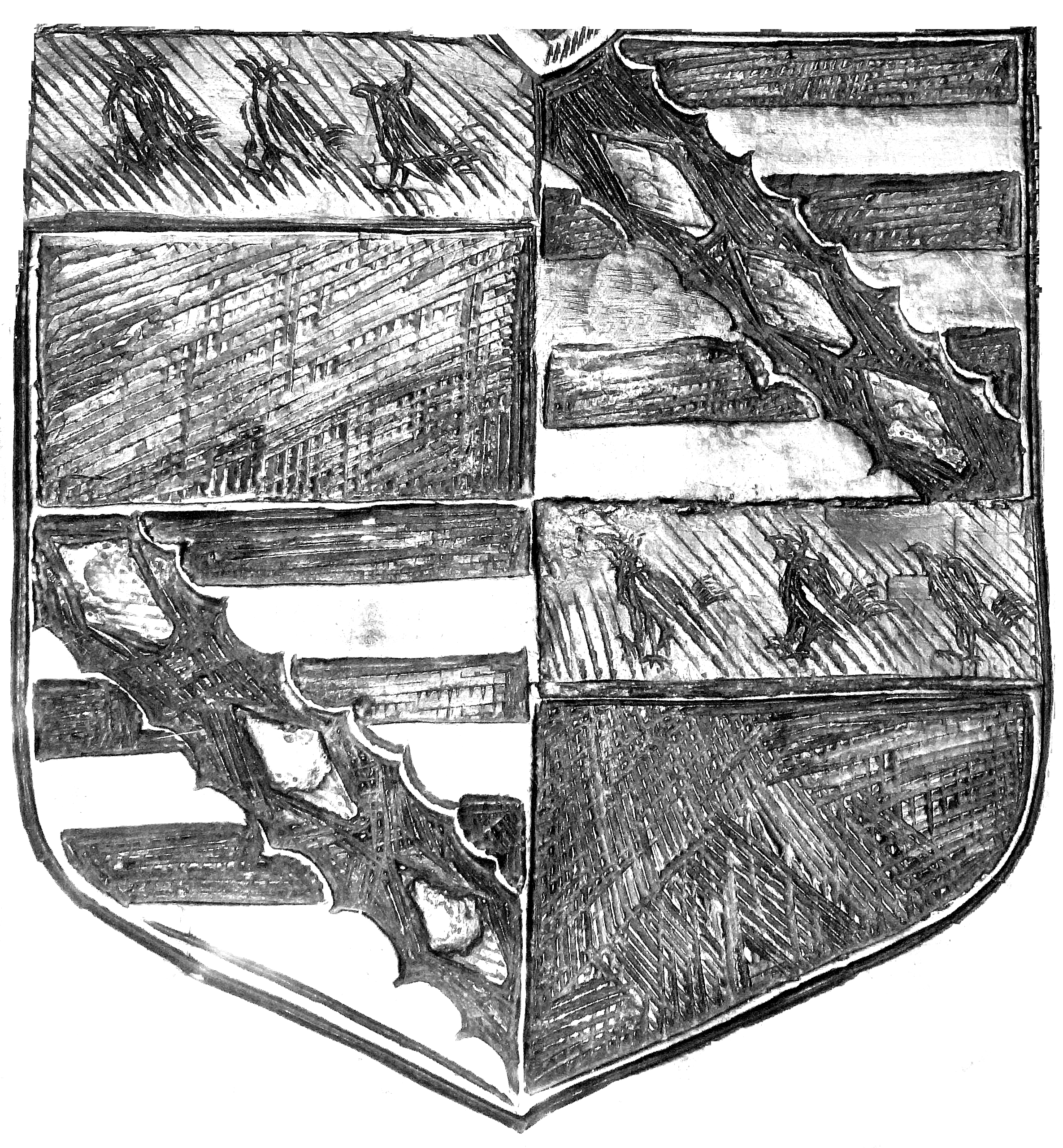
Left: monumental brass of William Hancock (d.1587), Combe Martin Church; right detail of escutcheon, arms: Quarterly 1st & 4th: (Hancock); 2nd & 3rd: Barry of six on a bend engrailed three lozenges (of unknown family and tinctures)

There exists in Combe Martin Church a monumental brass inscribed in Latin as follows: "Guilielm(us) Hancock generos(us) hui(us) paroeciae quo(n)da(m) incola in fide Christiana firm(a) certaq(ue) spe fret(us) vitae in coelis perpetuo duraturae migravit ex hac vita quarto die Februarii Anno Domini 1587.o cuius corpus sepultum est decimo nono mensis eiusdem relictis superstitibus tribus filiabus unoq(ue) filio" ("William Hancock, gentleman, once an inhabitant of this parish, in firm Christian faith and certain hope confiding in eternal life in perpetual Heaven departed from this life on the 4th day of February in the year of Our Lord the 1587th, of whom the body was buried on the 19th of the same month, with survivors remaining three daughters and one son").

William Hancock (d.1587) appears to have been born into a family already in the ranks of the gentry as is revealed by the presence of one quartering on the escutcheon in his monumental brass, denoting the existence of one heraldic heiress in his ancestry. The term "a servant" of Richard Pollard must therefore be interpreted loosely, in the same way that courtiers of the Tudor kings were often referred to as "servants of the king". He may therefore have been one of Pollard's assistant surveyors. William Hancock married twice:

- Firstly to Anne de Gaunte, daughter of "John de Gaunte of Lamberton Castle in Dorset", (which place is unidentified) by whom he had a daughter Petronell, married to Anthony Randall of Kentisbury.
- Secondly to Jane Balsh, daughter of Edward Balsh of Kentisbury, by whom he had a son and two daughters:
  - Edward Hancock (c.1560-1603) (see below), son and heir;
  - Elizabeth Hancock (d.1632), married Henry Preston (d.1623) of Upottery
  - Joane Hancock, married Henry Parminter.

==== Edward Hancock (d.1603) ====
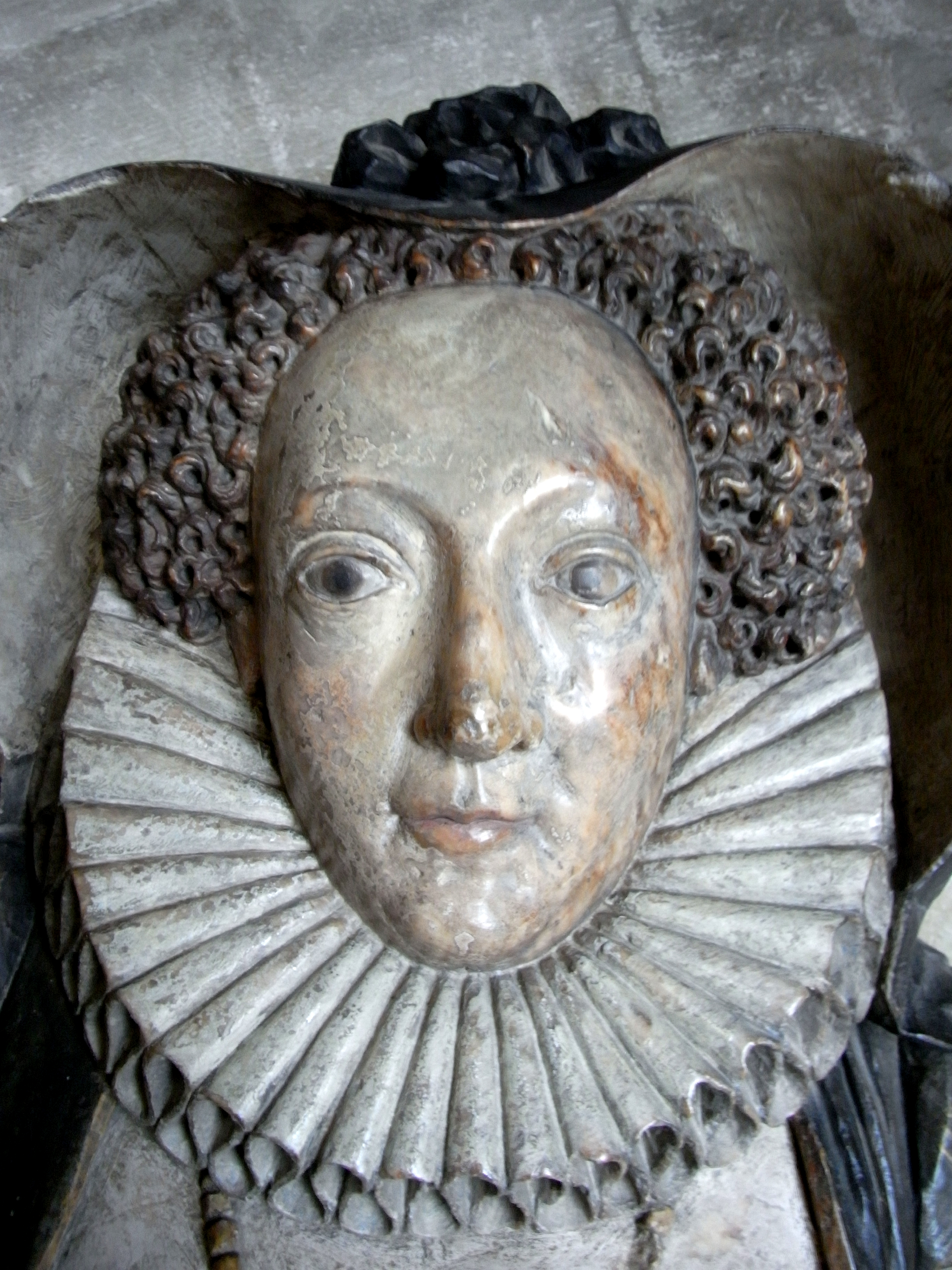
Dorothy Bampfield (d. 1617), wife of Edward Hancock (c.1560–1603), detail from her effigy in the Lady Chapel of Exeter Cathedral

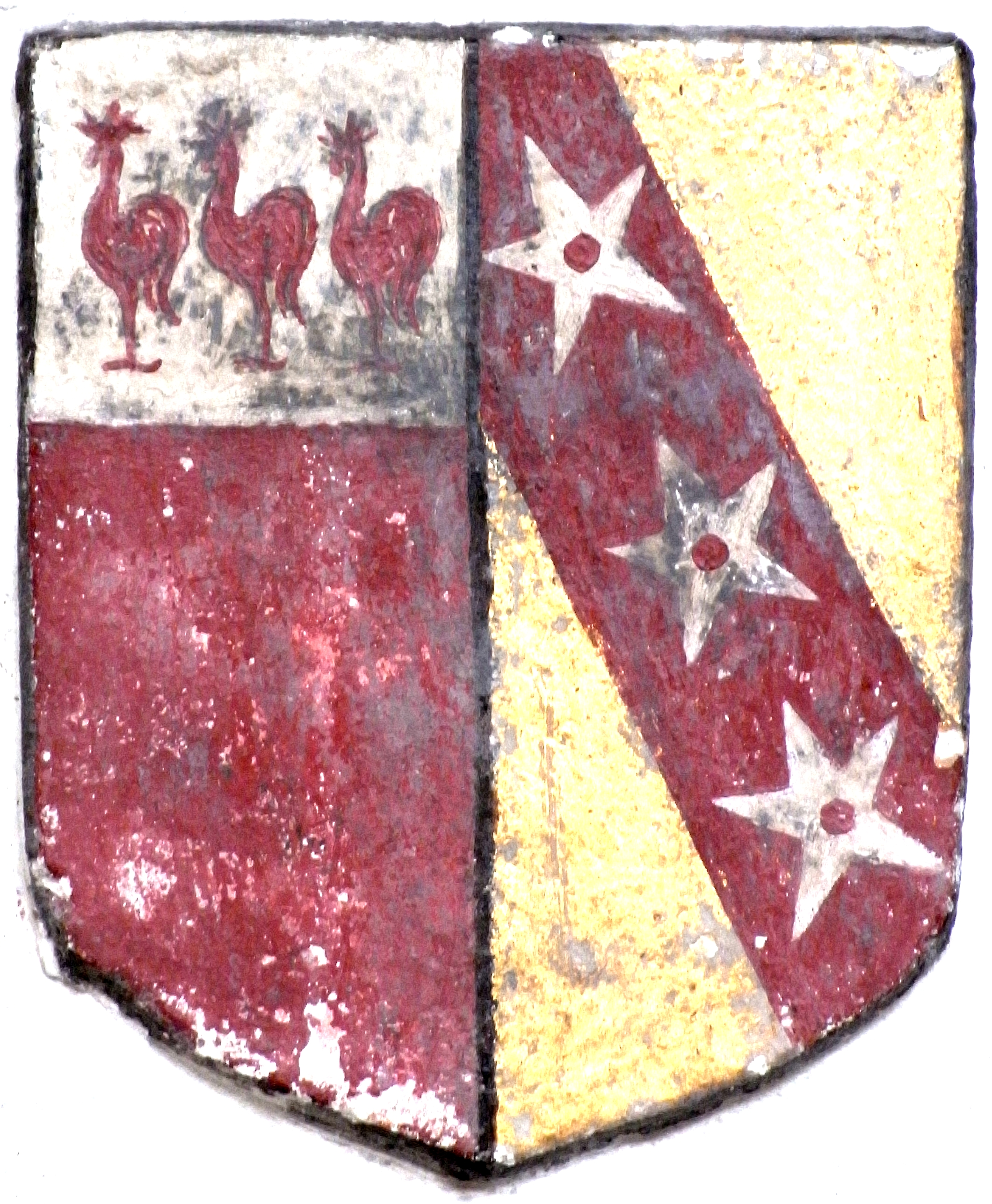
Heraldic escutcheon showing the arms of Hancock of Combe Martin: Gules, on a chief argent three cocks of the field impaling Bampfield of Poltimore: Or, on a bend gules three mullets argent (shown here pierced). Detail from the base of the monument of Dorothy Bampfield (d.1617) in the Lady Chapel of Exeter Cathedral

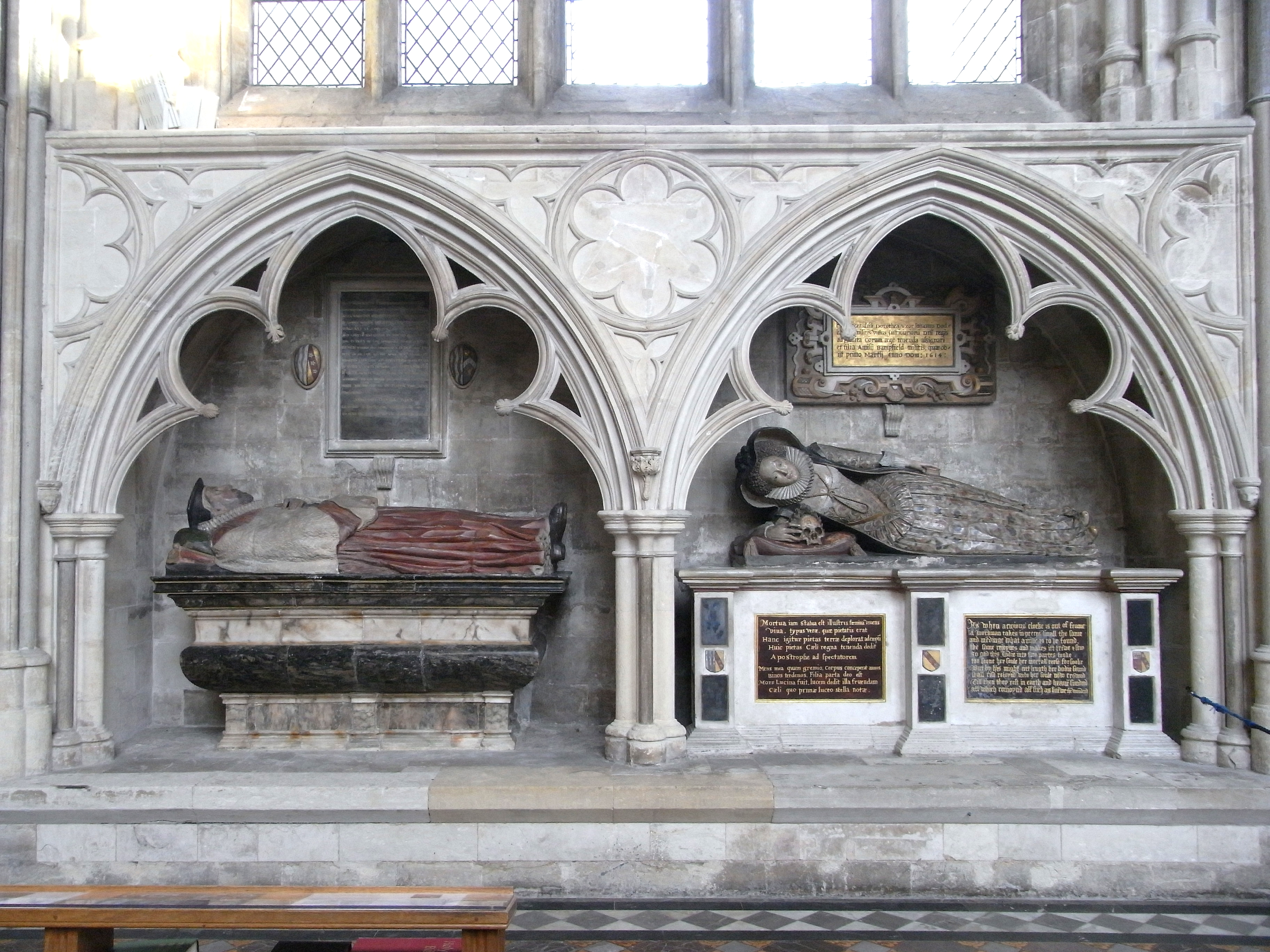
Monuments to the mother and step-father of William Hancock (1602–1625), north wall of Lady Chapel, Exeter Cathedral. Right: Dorothy Bampfield (d.1617), left: Sir John Dodderidge (1555-1628). Above Dorothy's effigy on a tablet within a strapwork surround is the following Latin inscription: "Hic jacet d(omi)na Dorothea uxor Johannis Dioderidge militis unius justiciarioru(m) d(omi)ni regis as placita coram rege tenenda assignati et filia Amisii Bampfield militis quae obiit primo Martii Anno Dom(ini) 1614" ("Here lies Dorothy the wife of John Doderidge, knight, one of the Justices of the Lord King assigned at the Pleas held before the King, and daughter of Amisus (Latinised form) Bampfield, knight, who died on the first of March in the Year of Our Lord 1614")

Edward Hancock (c.1560-1603), (son) MP for Plympton Erle (1593), Barnstaple (1597) and Aldborough (1601). He matriculated at Trinity College, Cambridge in 1578 and entered the Inner Temple c.1580 and was called to the bar in 1590. He was Clerk of Assize on the western circuit in 1590. He purchased the estate and mansion house of Mount Radford, Exeter from Arthur Radford, son of its builder, which he made his secondary seat. He married Dorothy Bampfield (d.1614), daughter of Sir Amyas Bampfylde (1560–1626), MP, of Poltimore, near Exeter, and North Molton in North Devon. Edward Hancock committed suicide on 6 September 1603. He left a one-year-old son and heir William II Hancock (1602–1625). Dorothy survived her husband and lived on at Mount Radford, her dower house. She remarried to the highly influential Sir John Doddridge (1555–1628), a Justice of the King's Bench, and contemporary of her father, who had purchased as his seat the estate of Bremridge, near Dorothy's father's seat of North Molton. She was a Maid of Honour to Queen Elizabeth I and has a sumptuous monument to her memory in the Lady Chapel of Exeter Cathedral, next to that of Dodderidge.

==== William II Hancock (d.1625) ====
The father of William II Hancock (1602–1625) committed suicide when William was an infant aged one year. His mother Dorothy Bampfield then remarried, as his 2nd wife, the highly influential Sir John Doddridge (1555–1628), a Justice of the King's Bench, and contemporary of her father, who had purchased as his seat the estate of Bremridge, near Dorothy's father's seat of North Molton. They had no children. His mother then Lady Dodderidge died in 1617 when William was aged 15 and he appears to have remained in the care of his step-father Dodderidge, who remarried to Anne Culme, the grand-daughter of Hugh II Culme (d.1545) of Molland-Champson, a manor adjoining North Molton. Anne thus effectively became William's step-mother. She had previously been married to Gabriel Newman, a member of the Worshipful Company of Goldsmiths in the City of London, to whom she had borne a daughter Judith Newman (1608–1634), who was 6 years William's junior. The Newman (or Neuman) family later were seated at Baconsthorpe in Norfolk, in the parish church of which are some grave-slabs sculpted with the family's arms. At or before her 17th birthday she and the 23-year-old William were married and had two children:

- Anne Hancock, who married Rev. George Cary (1611-1680), of Clovelly, Dean of Exeter and rector of Shobrooke near Crediton. Their son was Sir George Cary (1653–1684/5), MP for Okehampton, whose monument exists in Clovelly Church.
- John Hancock (1625–1661), (see below) son and heir, in the year of whose birth William died, leaving Judith a 17-year-old widow.

At the time of her 1st husband's death in 1625 Sir John Dodderidge and his wife Anne Culme were then still living and presumably had some part in the care of the now fatherless infant. Judith soon remarried to Thomas II Ivatt, but died aged 26 having given birth to a son and heir Thomas III Ivatt, who later resided at Shobrooke near Crediton. Thomas II Ivatt was the eldest son of Thomas I Ivatt (d.1629), who had purchased in 1624 for the sum of £3,000 a lease of the profitable office of "Searcher of the Port of London" the reversion of which he bequeathed in his will to his son Thomas II Ivatt together with the sum of £400 to cover the cost of acquiring a new royal patent. Philipa, The widow of Thomas I Ivatt, of unknown family, was a lunatic, and her wardship was sold by the king in 1629 to the poet Aurelian Townsend (d.1643) They had the following progeny:

- Thomas III Ivatt (d.1691) of Shobrooke.
- Judith Ivatt

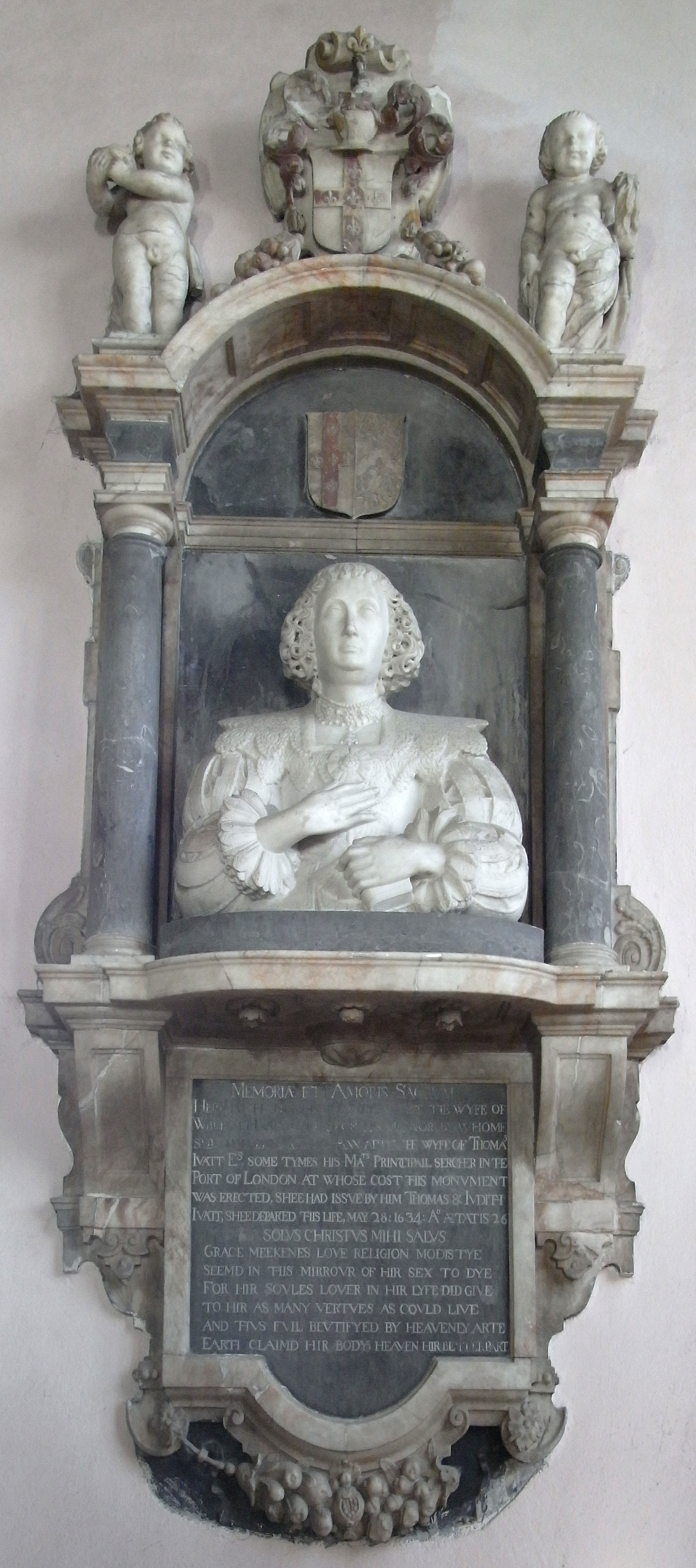
Monument to Judith Newman (1608-1634) firstly wife of William I Hancock (d.1625), secondly of Thomas II Ivatt, Combe Martin Church. Above are displayed within an escutcheon the following arms: Argent, on a cross gules five fleurs-de-lis or (Ivatt) impaling Azure, a chevron wavy between three griffons segreant or (Newman)

Judith's second husband Thomas II Ivatt erected a monument with a bust in white marble of his wife in Combe Martin church, positioned on the north wall of the north aisle chapel above the vestry door. This is similar in design to the contemporary monument to Penelope Noel in Chipping Campden Church, Gloucestershire. It is inscribed thus:

"Memoriae Amoris Sacrum. (Sacred to the memory of Love) Here lyeth the body of Judith first the wyfe of William Hancock Lord of this mannor by whome she had issue John & Ann, after the wyfe of Thomas Ivatt Es(q) some tymes His Ma(jes)t's printcipail sercher in the Port of London at whose cost this monument was erected. Shee had issue by him Thomas & Judith Ivatt. Shee departed this life May 28 1634 A(nn)o Aetatis 26. (in the year of (her) age 26) Solus Christus mihi salus". (Christ alone is salvation to me)
"Grace meekenes love religion modistye
Seem'd in this mirrour of her sex to dye
For hir soule's lover in hir lyfe did give
To hir as many vertues as could live
And thus full beutifyed by heavenly arte
Earth claim'd hir body Heaven hir better parte"

Judith was buried in the middle of the aisle of this chapel, in the floor of which exists a large sandstone ledger slab inscribed thus:

"Fuimus (We Were) Here lyeth the body of Judith Ivatt wife of Thomas Ivatt Es(q). for whome he lay'd this stone & erected the monument in the north isle of this chancel. Erimus" (We shall be).

==== John Hancock (1625–1661) ====
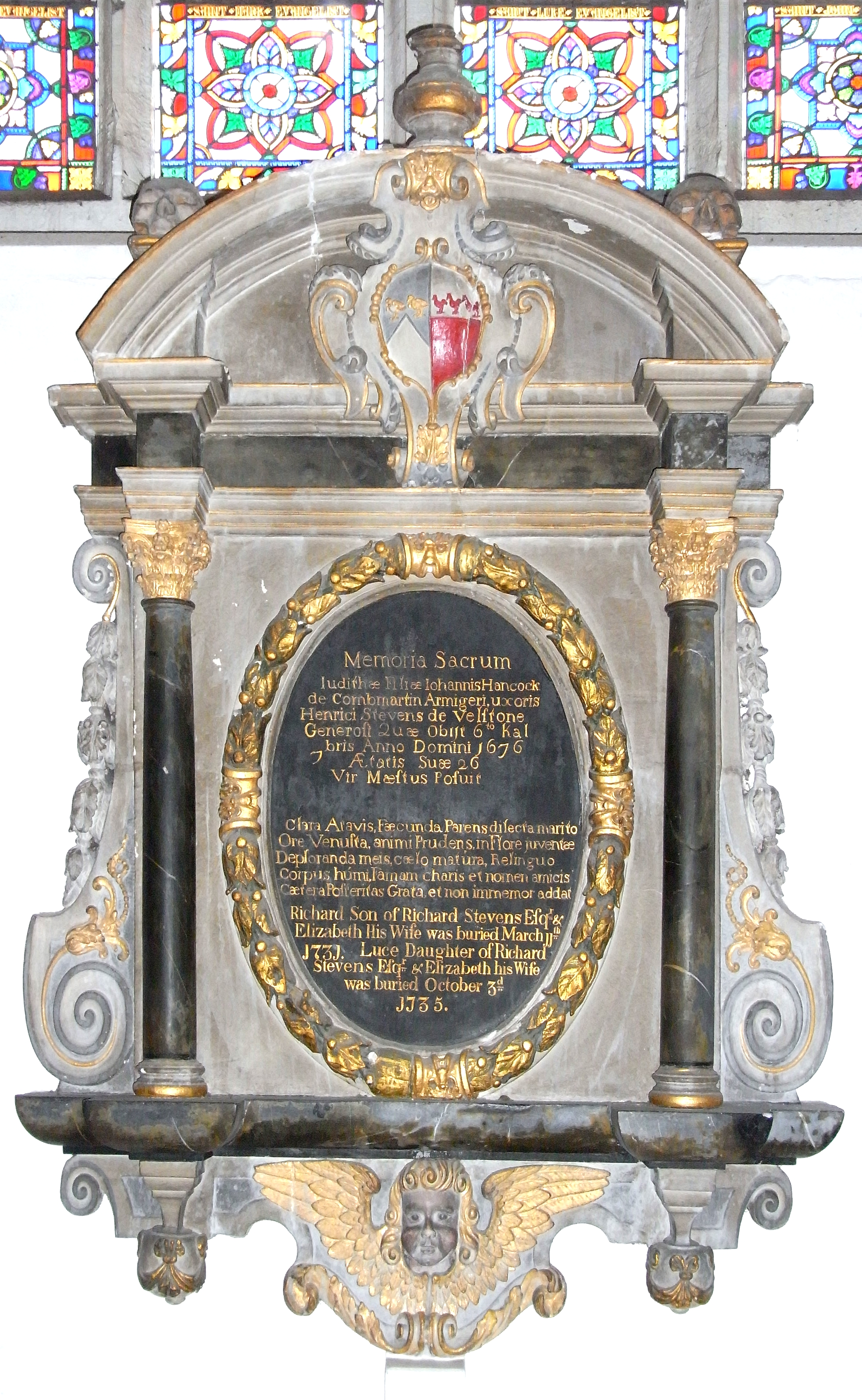
Monument to Judith Hancock (1650–1676), wife of Henry Stevens (1617-post 1675) of Vielstone in the parish of Buckland Brewer, son and heir of William Stevens (d.1648) of Great Torrington. Great Torrington Church, east wall of south aisle

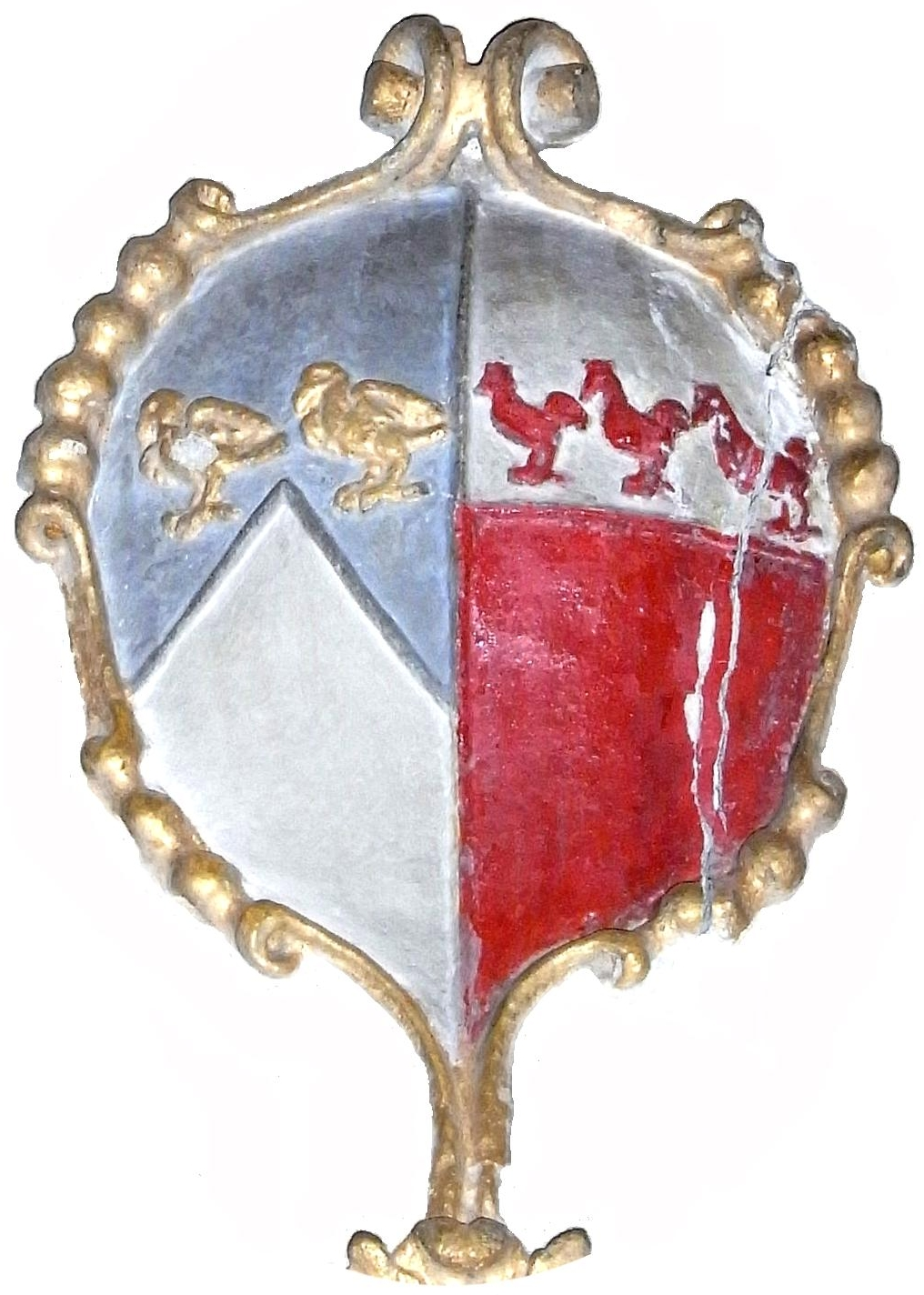
Heraldic escutcheon showing arms of Stevens of Veilstone in the parish of Buckland Brewer (Per chevron azure and argent, in chief two falcons rising or) impaling Hancock of Combe Martin (Gules, on a chief argent three cocks of the field). Detail from mural monument to Judith Hancock (1650–1676), wife of Henry Stevens of Vielstone, east wall of south aisle, Great Torrington Church, Devon

John Hancock (1625–1661), eldest son and heir, who was an infant aged 1 year at his father's death. He became a ward of the king. He married Anne Sainthill, daughter of Peter Sainthill (1596–1648) of Bradninch, by whom he had 3 children:

- Edward Hancock, son and heir
- John Hancock,
- Judith Hancock (1650–1676), who married, as his 2nd wife, Henry Stevens (1617-post 1675) of Vielstone in the parish of Buckland Brewer, eldest son and heir of William Stevens (d.1648) of Great Torrington, apparently a younger son of the Stevens family of Chavenage House, near Tetbury in Gloucestershire. Her mural monument, on which the arms of Stevens (Per chevron azure and argent, in chief two falcons rising or) impale Hancock, exists in Great Torrington Church. The Stevens family later resided at Cross in the parish of Little Torrington and at Winscott in the parish of Peters Marland. They were briefly in the 19th. century the heirs apparent of John Rolle, 1st Baron Rolle (d.1842) of Stevenstone, the largest landowner in Devon. The inscription on the monument is as follows:

Memoria Sacrum Judithae filiae Johannis Hancock de Combmartin, Armigeri, uxoris Henrici Stevens de Velstone, Generosi, quae obiit 6to (sexto) Kal(endae) 7bris (Septembris) Anno Domini 1676 aetatis suae 26. Vir maestus posuit ("Sacred to the memory of Judith, daughter of John Hancock of Combe Martin, Esquire, wife of Henry Stevens of Vielstone, Gentleman, who departed the 6th of the month of September in the Year of Our Lord 1676 of her age 26. Her sorrowful husband erected this")
