= Black rat (disambiguation) =

The black rat (Rattus rattus) is a common long-tailed rodent.

Black rat or Rattus rattus may refer to:

- Rattus Rattus (album), a 2005 album by Merzbow
- Black Rat (album), a 2014 album by DZ Deathrays
- Black Rat (film), a 2010 Japanese horror film
- Black Rat (restaurant), Winchester, Hampshire, England
- "Black Raat", a song by Guru Randhawa from Man of the Moon, 2022

== See also ==
- Brown rat (Rattus norvegicus)
