= Church of St Peter ad Vincula, Combe Martin =

Church in Devon, England

Coordinates: 51.1984°N 4.0248°W

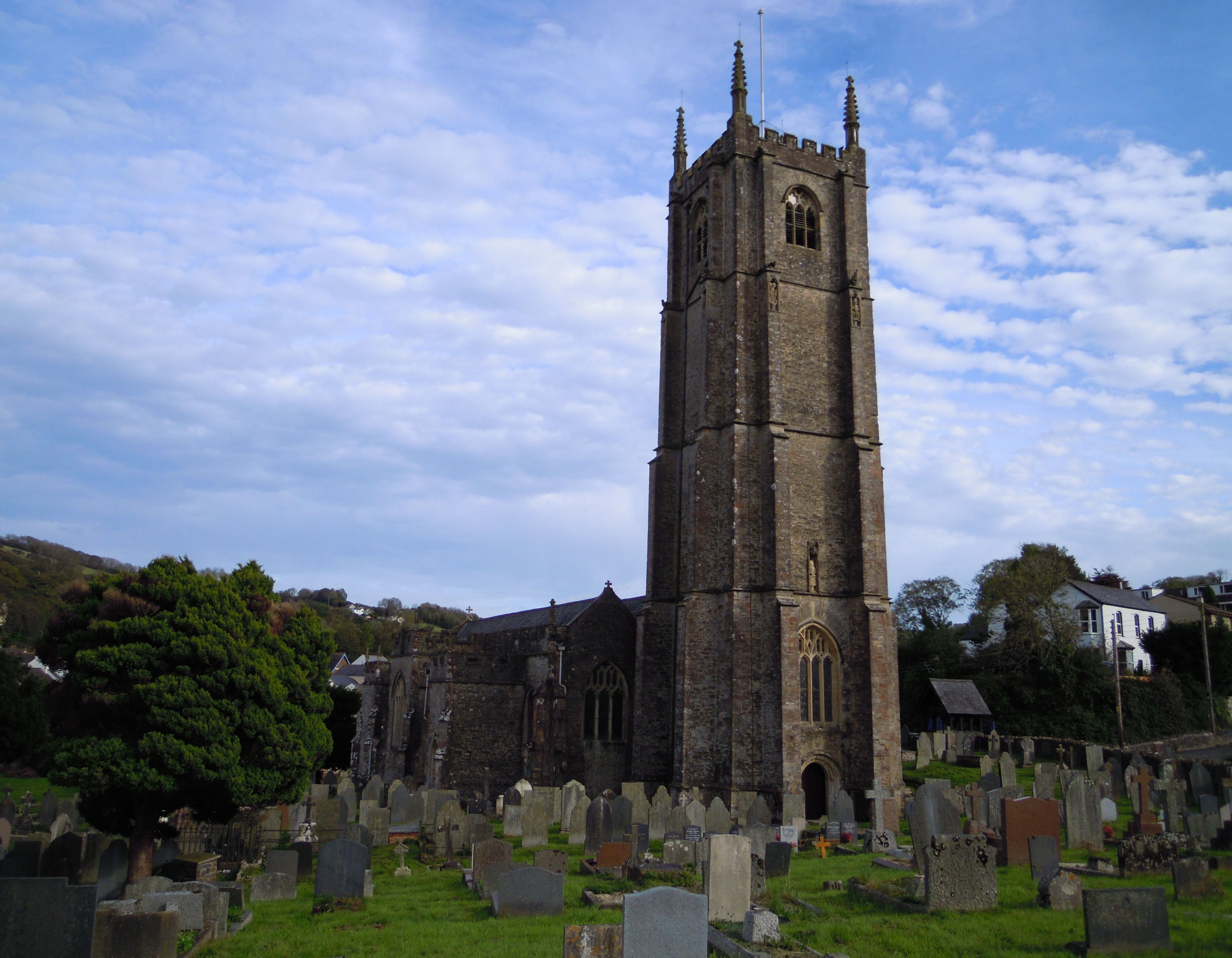
The Church of St Peter ad Vincula in Combe Martin

The Church of St Peter ad Vincula is the Church of England parish church for the village of Combe Martin in North Devon, England. Possibly built on the site of a Saxon church, construction of the present building began in the 13th century, with additions in the 15th century and later. It has been a Grade I listed building since 1965. The church comes under the Diocese of Exeter. Pevsner describes the church as "One of the best in the neighbourhood." The church is one of only 15 in England dedicated to St Peter ad Vincula ("St Peter in Chains"), after the basilica of San Pietro in Vincoli in Rome.

== Exterior features ==
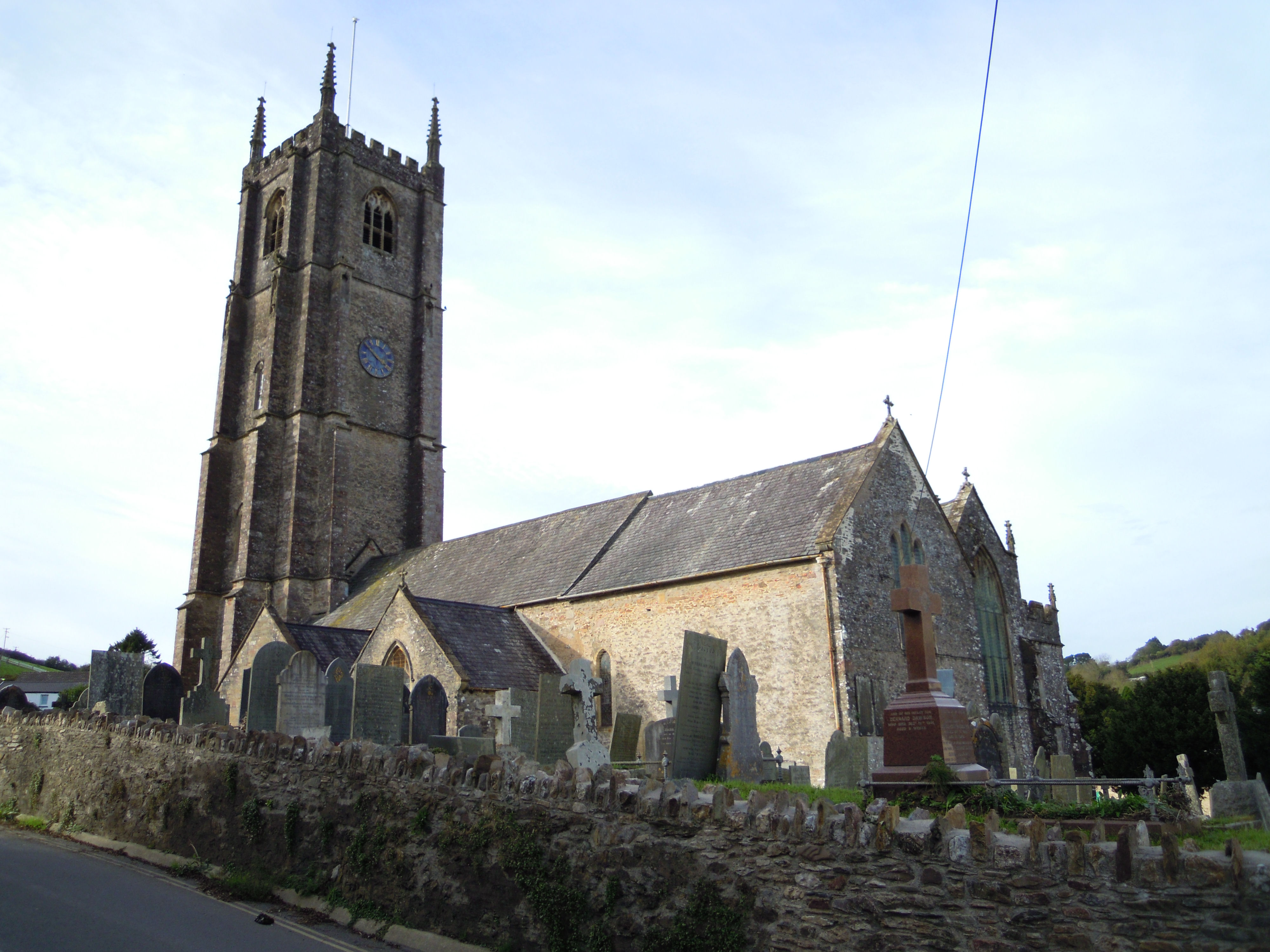
Church of St Peter ad Vincula

A large parish church for the size of the village owing to the time when silver was mined in the area, the church is dedicated to St. Peter ad Vincula ("St. Peter in Chains") and is derived from the ancient Basilica of San Pietro in Vincoli in Rome. Built with stone rubble with ashlar dressings and with a dressed stone façade to the south porch, the structure was constructed in the Early English style with 13th-century materials surviving in the south transept and on the south side of the chancel and nave. In the early 15th century the north aisle and north chancel chapel, north porch and west tower were added, and in the late 15th or early 16th-century a north transept. The south porch was rebuilt in 1725, while the church was restored in 1858 and again in 1881.

The slate roofs have coped gable ends and apex crosses, while there are embattled parapets to the west tower, vestry, north transept and north porch. The tall west tower is 99 feet in height with tall and thin crocketed pinnacles. It is of four stages with embattled parapets and setback buttresses with two tiers of gargoyles and trefoil-headed niches to the north and south buttresses holding now weathered statues. The tower has large three-light Perpendicular bell-openings on each face and a cusped niche holding a carved figure of Christ. The tower contains a clock and eight bells, recast by Taylor of Oxford in 1827 and by Mears and Stainbank of London in 1922.

== Interior design ==
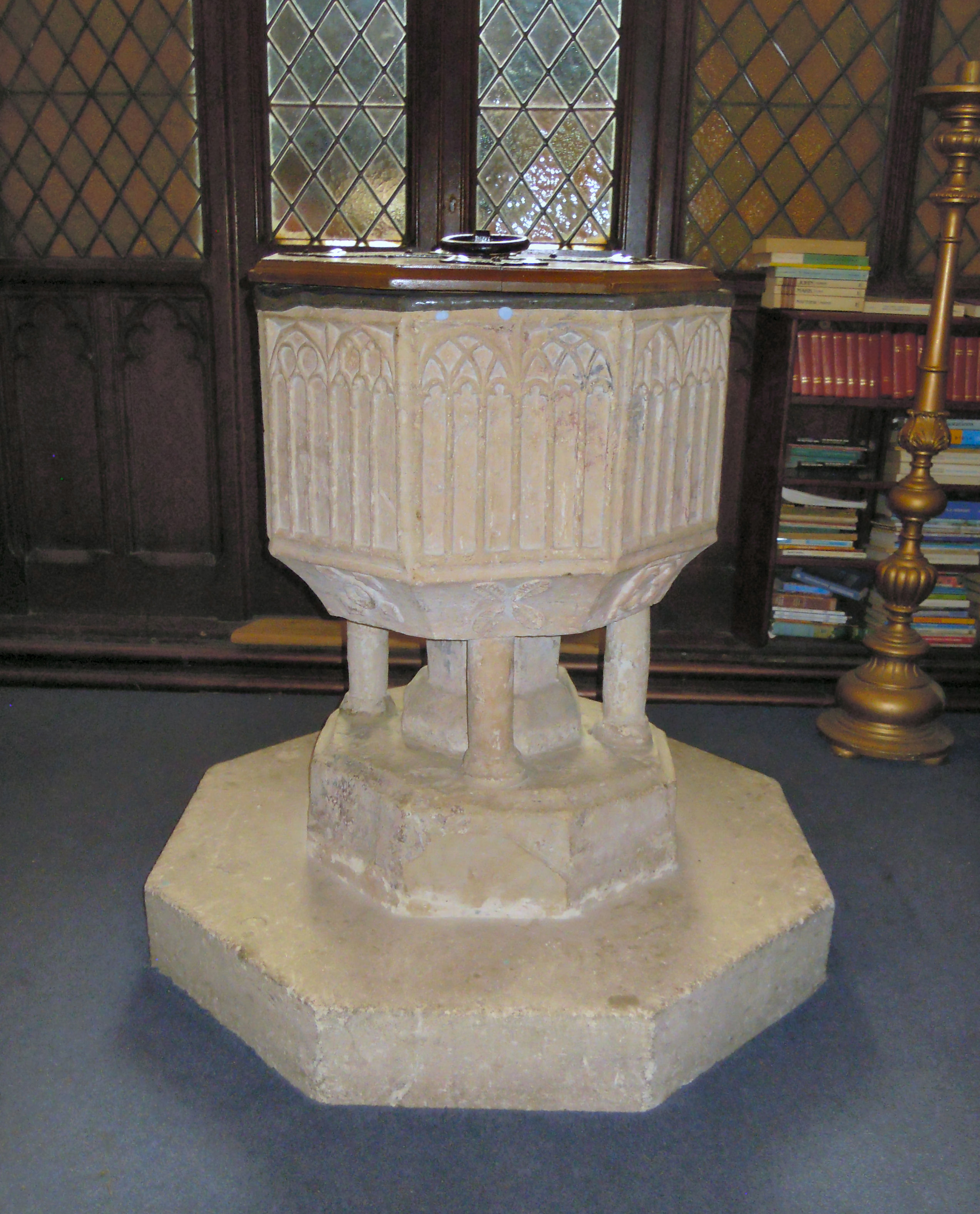
The baptismal font is 15th-century

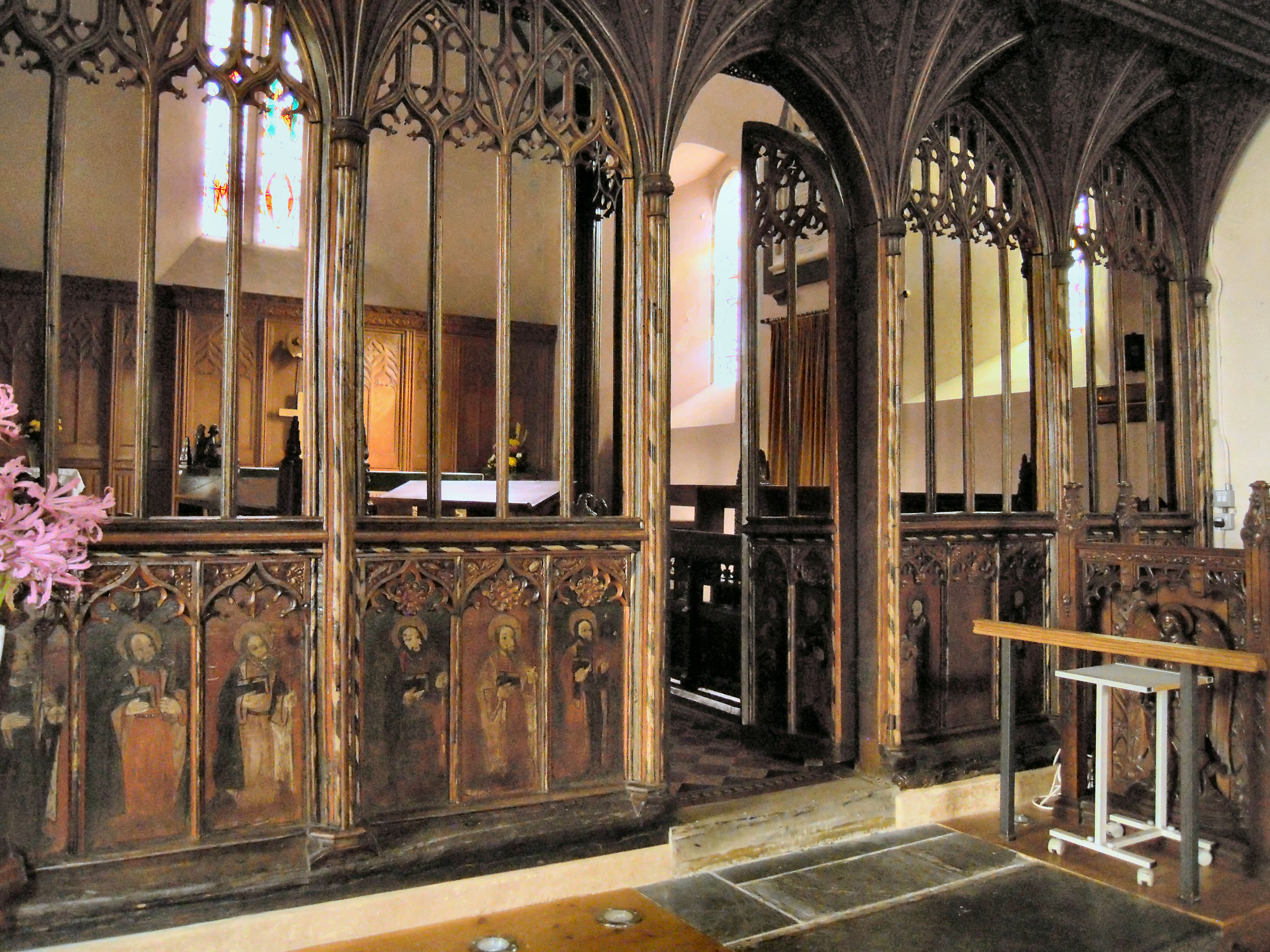
The Rood Screen is 15th-century and retains its painted figures

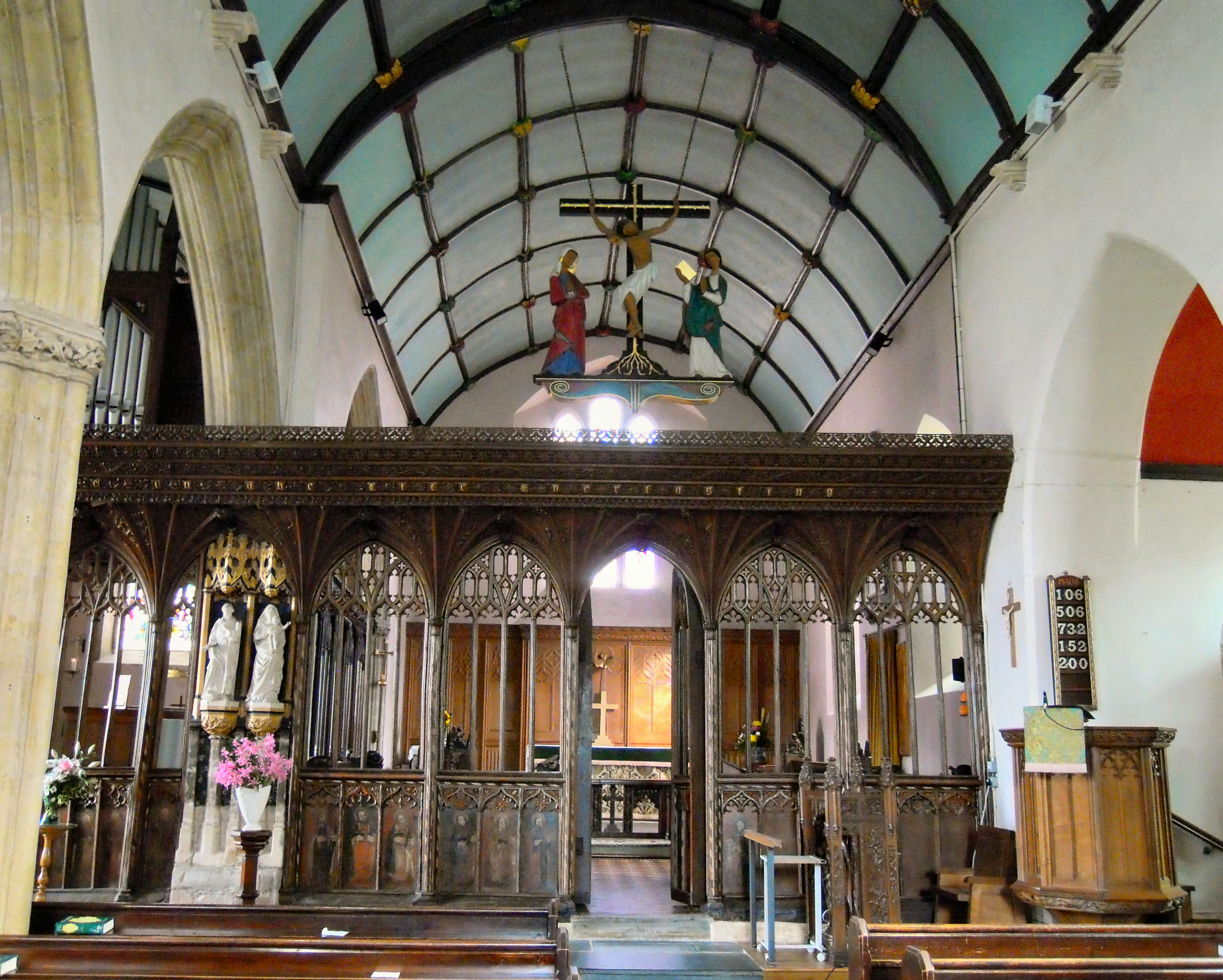
Looking east towards the Rood Screen

There are twin arches between the chancel and the chancel chapel with on the west side two canopied niches holding two statues supported on slender shafts with the original painted scrolling foliage carved below and to the backs of niches. The niches are part of a 15th-century rood screen of 9½ bays carved in the Perpendicular style. The Rood figures of Jesus, Mary and John the Apostle were carved in 1962 by Colin Shewring, basing his work on a picture in a medieval Book of Hours. The chancel bays have three panels and the chancel chapel bays have four panels, with all the panels except for three still with their original Tudor painted figures of The Apostles and Christ. These were painted by three different artists, presumably as more money from the silver mines became available. These paintings are the only preserved examples in North Devon. Female saints are depicted on what would have been the women's side of the church. In 1912 the screen was restored at a cost of about £330. In 2009 the church received £45,000 from the Lottery Heritage Fund towards its £64,000 total to conserve the medieval screen and its paintings.

The Parclose screen dates to about 1333 when the Chantry Chapel (the present Lady Chapel) was added. New choir stalls were added in 1913 and new altar rails in 1914. The baptismal font dates to 1427 and is Perpendicular with an octagonal lead-lined bowl and is decorated with blind traceried panels to each face; it retains traces of its original paint. The short circular stem has four narrow outer columns. Alongside the font can be seen evidence of medieval wall paintwork. The Peter's Pence oak chest is 16th-century. The damaged pew ends in the chancel chapel are 16th-century. The vestry plank door is probably 15th-century and still retains its original sanctuary ring and lock. A new organ was installed in 1905 in memory of the Rev. Humphry William Toms M.A., Rector from 1842 to 1904. The Devon cradle or wagon roofs are everywhere and were ceiled in 1725, that of the North transept being especially attractive with stars in the centre of the panels. Two Green Men are also visible.

== Monuments ==
There are various monuments in the church. On the south wall of the chancel is a monument to Richard Harding (d.1831) and his family while on the north aisle is a monument to George Ley (d.1716), who built the nearby Pack o' Cards, supposedly after a large win while playing cards. In the chancel chapel is a marble wall monument to Judith Ivatt (d.1634), wife of Thomas Ivatt 'his Majesty's principal sercher in the port of London'. A monumental brass on the south side is to William Hancock (d.1587) with his coat-of-arms above an inscription. The stained glass includes a three-panel window by Archibald John Davies, illustrating the calling of St Andrew and St Peter. The chancel west lancet retains some medieval glass to its central section showing seraphim and wheels.

== Churchyard ==
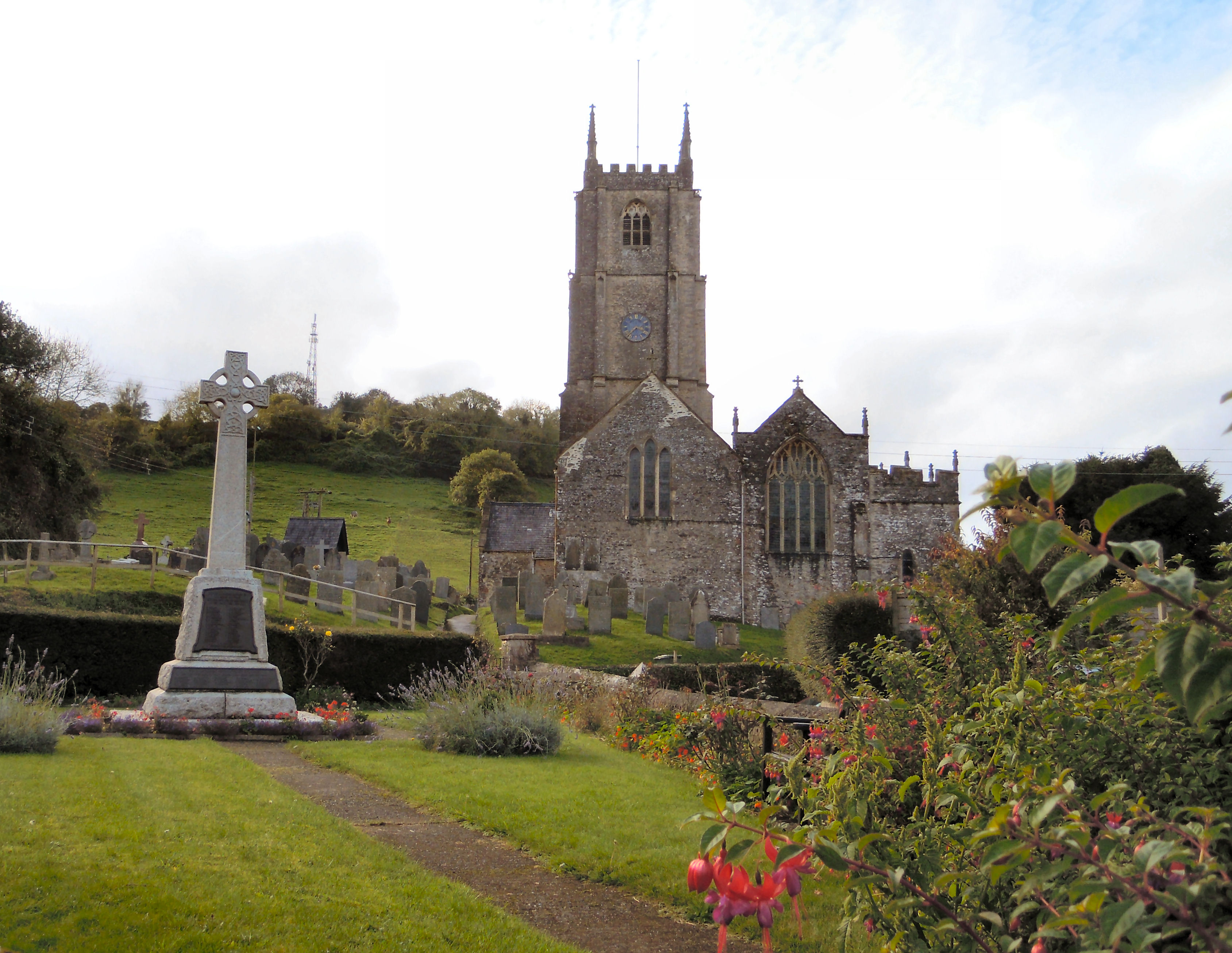
The War Memorial attached to the churchyard

In the churchyard near the lychgate is buried James Norman (c1844-1898), the sexton at the church and the inspiration for Reuben Dale in The Mighty Atom (1896) by Marie Corelli, written during her stay at the nearby Pack o' Cards inn. The war memorial in the Garden of Remembrance attached to the churchyard is in the form of a cross and was designed by W C Willis and unveiled in 1921. It commemorates the dead of the village from both World Wars.

== Gallery ==
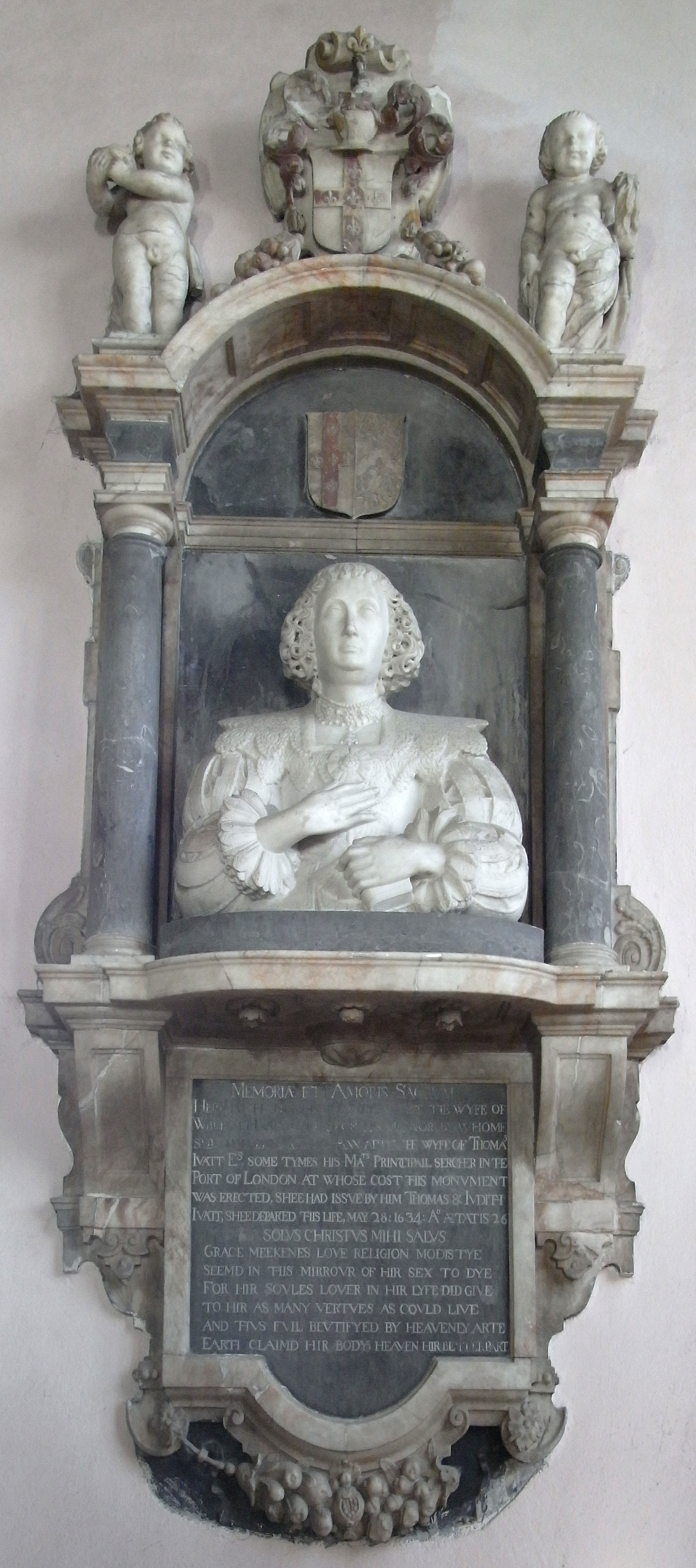
Monument to Judith Newman (1608-1634) firstly wife of William I Hancock (d.1625), secondly of Thomas II Ivatt, erected by her second husband.

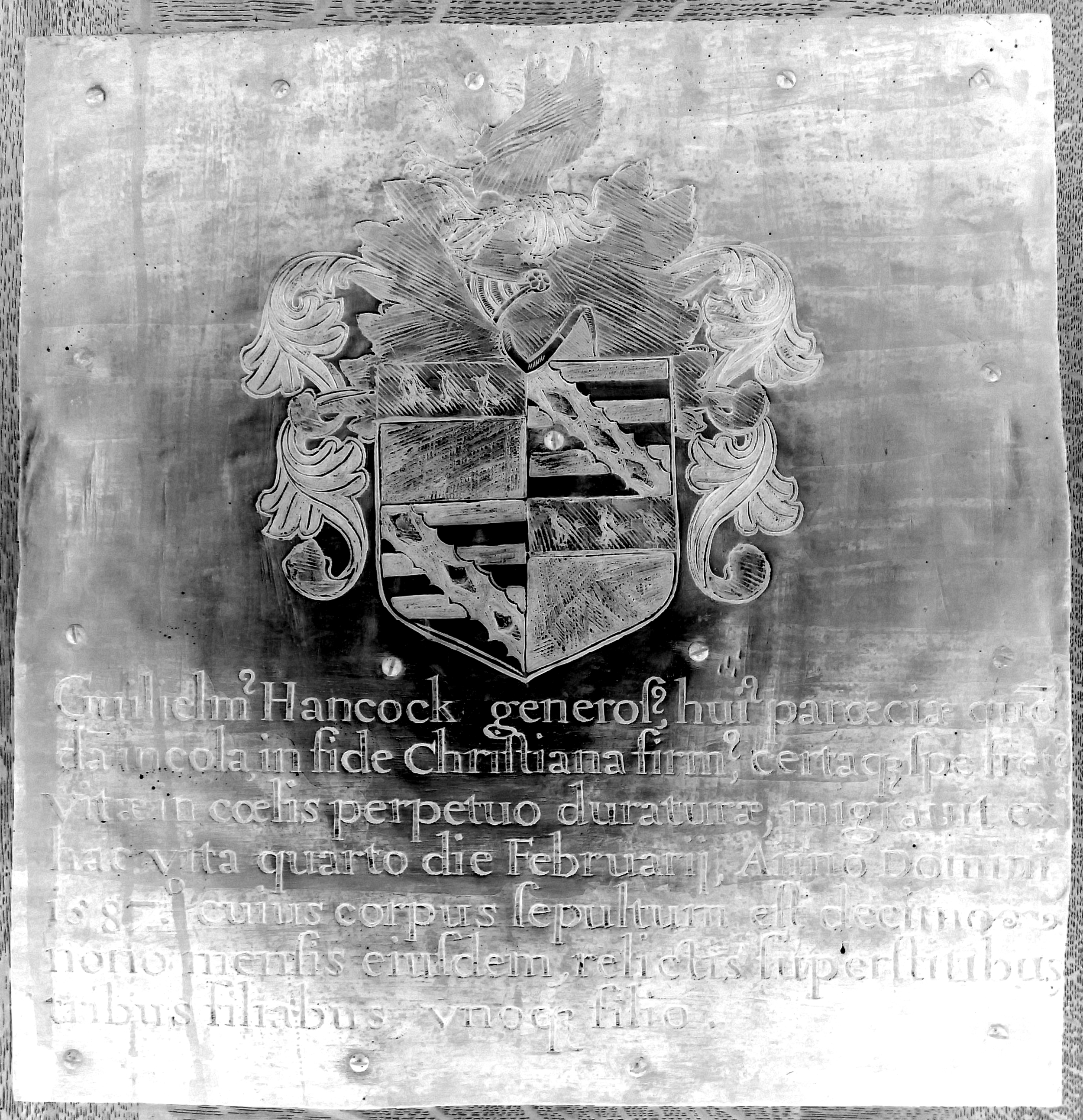
Monumental brass of William Hancock (d.1587)

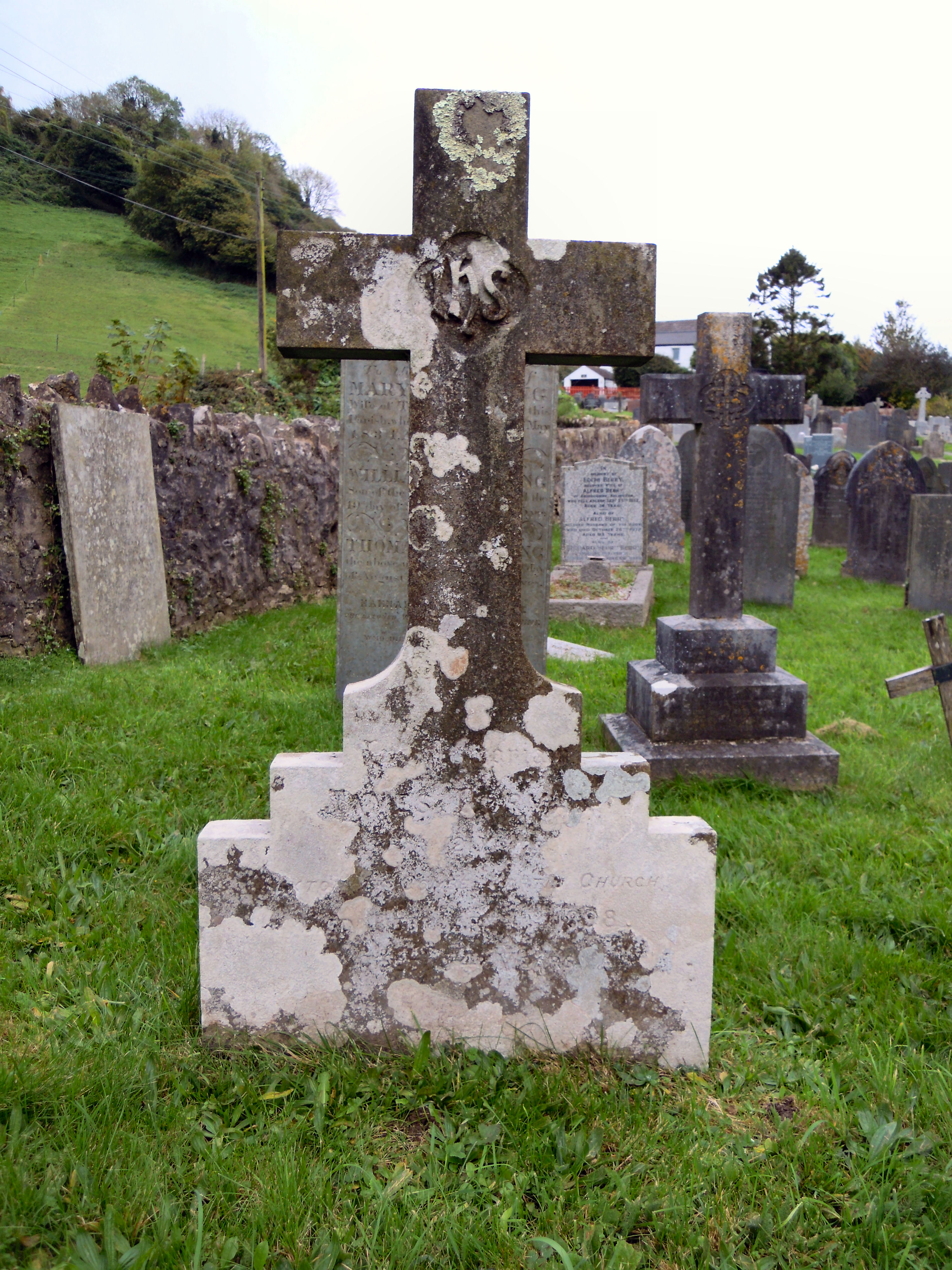
The grave of James Norman, the model for Reuben Dale in Marie Corelli's The Mighty Atom (1896)
