= Newberry Castle =

Iron Age hill fort in Devon, England

Coordinates: 51.193°N 4.024°W

Newberry Castle is an Iron Age Hill Fort close to Combe Martin in Devon, England.It takes the form of an earthwork hillside enclosure close on an outcrop of a hill on the north eastern shoulder of Newberry Hill at an elevation 110 metres (360 ft) above sea level.
