= Hangman cliffs =

Cliffs in Devon, England

Coordinates: 51.21654°N 4.01451°W

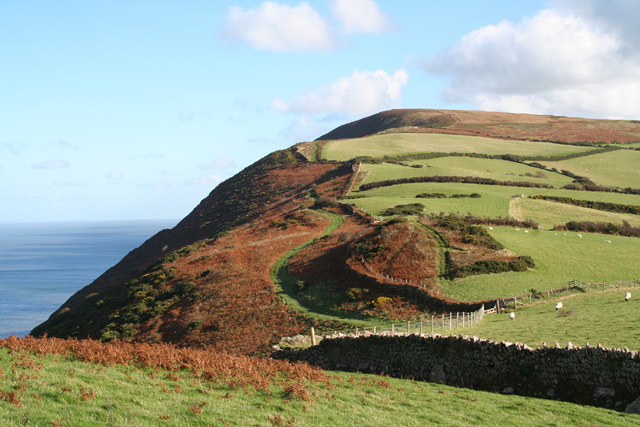
Great Hangman from Little Hangman on the South West Coast Path

Hangman cliffs, consisting of Great Hangman and Little Hangman, are near Combe Martin on the north coast of Devon, England, where Exmoor meets the sea.

Great Hangman, with its summit at grid reference SS601481, is 1,043 feet (318 m) high with a cliff face of 800 feet (244 m). It is the highest sea cliff in England and the highest point on the South West Coast Path. Little Hangman is 716 feet (218 m) high and overlooks the village of Combe Martin at the western boundary of Exmoor National Park. Both cliffs lie on the South West Coast Path and are in an Area of Outstanding Natural Beauty. The cliffs are formed from a considerable thickness of sandstone known as the Hangman Grits (or more formally the Hangman Sandstone Formation) laid down during the Devonian Period. They were subsequently folded during the Variscan Orogeny and the strata are seen locally to dip southwards at between 25 and 35 degrees. There is an abandoned working for iron ore below Great Hangman at Blackstone Point.

No early forms of the place-name Hangman there are recorded: its first mention, as Hangman Hill, was in 1792. However, there is a fanciful derivation of the name, based on a local legend. The story goes that a sheep stealer was walking over the hill carrying a stolen ewe slung over his shoulder. He stopped to rest on a rock and the struggling sheep caused the cord tied around its legs to tighten and slip round the man's neck, strangling him. In all likelihood the name Hangman is a mixture of Celtic and Germanic languages. Mynydd in Welsh means "mountain" and hang is the Germanic word for "slope". There are other examples of hills being called man from Celtic origin, e.g. Old Man of Hoy or East/West Man in Purbeck. The literal translation for Hangman would be "sloping hill".

In fiction, Great Hangman is part of the setting of Meet the Tiger, the first in a long series of novels by Leslie Charteris featuring "The Saint". Simon Templar stays on Great Hangman in an abandoned World War I pillbox so he can find out about a Chicago gangster staying in Baycombe aka Combe Martin.
