= Clara Larter =

English botanist

Clara Ethelinda Larter FLS
- Born: 27 June 1847; Leeds, England
- Died: 13 May 1936 (aged 88); Torquay, England
- Scientific career
- Fields: Botany
- Author abbrev. (botany): Larter

Clara Ethelinda Larter (27 June 1847 - 13 May 1936) was an English botanist known for her studies of the flora of Devon.

== Personal life ==
Larter was born in Leeds as the eldest daughter of Thomas Larter, a language teacher. The family moved to Torquay, South Devon, around 1857.

From 1885, she lived in Barmouth, north Wales, for a period, before moving to Combe Martin, in North Devon, where she lived from at least 1899 until 1909, when she returned to Torquay. She died there on 13 May 1936.

She was a member of the Belgrave Congregational Church in Torquay.

== Botany ==
Larter began her botanical studies in 1897 and joined the Devon Association in 1906, being secretary of its new botany committee from 1909. She edited its report in 1914 and from 1920 to 1923; and was the inaugural chair of the association's botanical section from 1930 to 1936. She also joined the Torquay Natural History Society in 1909, and was a committee member 1913–1917, 1919-1923 and 1926–1928. She was its vice-president in 1917, 1918, 1928 and 1929, and chair of its botanical section, 1925–1936. The society made her an honorary member in 1932. She was recognized in 1912 as a fellow of the Linnean Society for her botanical research and was the county botanical recorder for Devon in 1924 and 1925.

Her last work, in the Flora of Devon, was published posthumously. She had been its original editor-in-chief, from 1930 to 1935, but had to resign due to ill health. Her herbarium was bequeathed to the Torquay National History Museum and her plant collection to Oxford University.

The standard author abbreviation Larter is used to indicate this person as the author when citing a botanical name.

Kallymenia larterae (Holmes, 1907) (originally Callymenia larteriae) was named in her honour.

== Bibliography ==
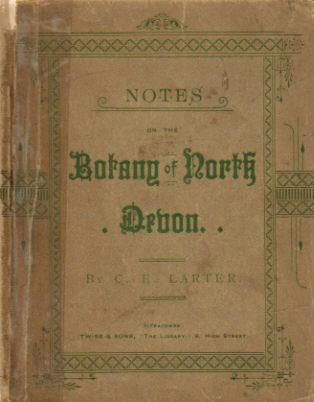
Cover of Notes on the Botany of North Devon (1897)

- —— (1897). Notes on the Botany of North Devon. Ilfracombe: Twiss and Sons.
- —— (1900). Manual of the flora of Torquay. Torquay: Andrew Iredale.
- —— (1918). Minehead, Porlock and Dunster: the seaboard of Exmoor. London: Homeland Association. (ran to at least 21 editions)

Larter also contributed to:

- Martin, W. Keble; Fraser, G. T., eds. (1939). The Flora of Devon: Phanerogams and higher Cryptogams. Arbroath: Buncle, T. & Co Ltd. (promoted by The Devonshire Association)
