= Kings Arms, Leaves Green =

Pub in Leaves Green, London

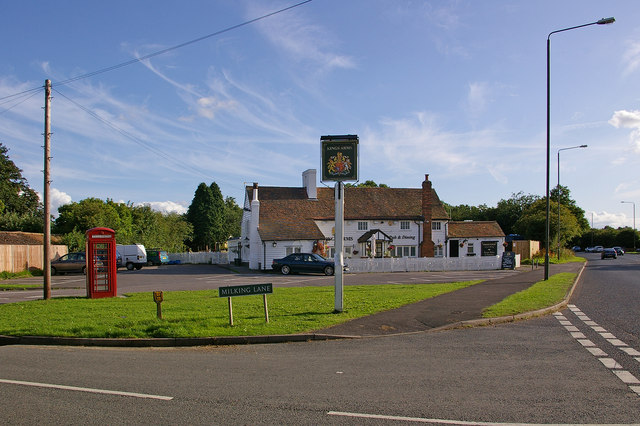
- Kings Arms, Leaves Green

- Location within London Borough of Bromley Location within Greater London

General information
- Location: Leaves Green Road, Leaves Green, Keston BR2 6DU, Bromley, London, England
- Coordinates: 51.335238°N 0.0296755°E

Design and construction
- Designations

Listed Building – Grade II
- Official name: Kings Arms Public House
- Designated: 29 June 1973; 53 years ago
- Reference no.: 1064393

The Kings Arms, Leaves Green is a pub in Leaves Green Road, Leaves Green, Keston, Bromley, London.

It is a Grade II listed building, dating back to the 18th century.
