= King's Arms, Waterloo =

Pub in Waterloo, London

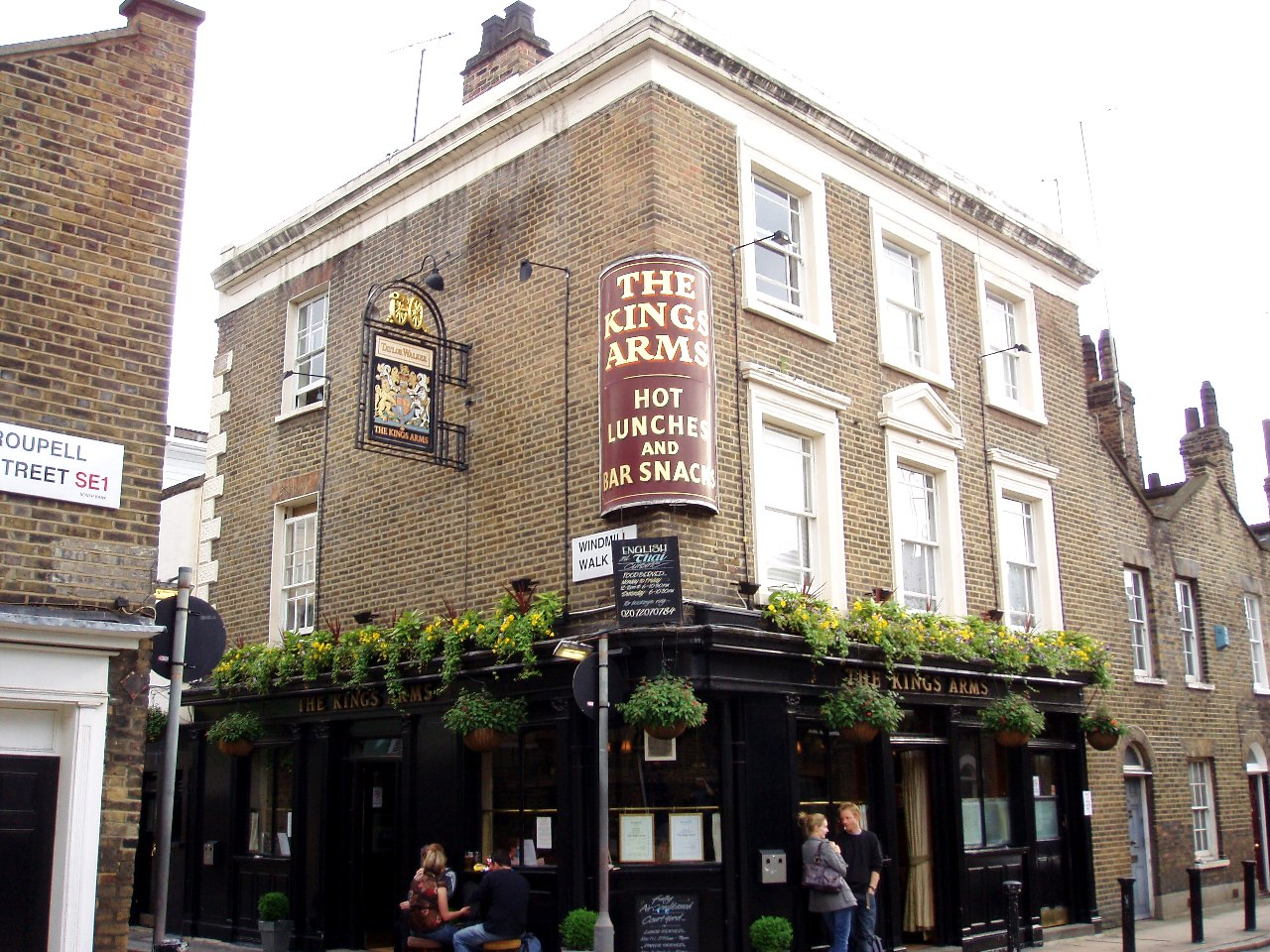
- The King's Arms, Waterloo

- Location within London Borough of Lambeth Location within Greater London

General information
- Location: 25 Roupell Street, Waterloo, London, England
- Coordinates: 51.504401°N 0.109072°W

Design and construction
- Designations

Listed Building – Grade II
- Official name: King's Arms Public House
- Designated: 27 August 1976
- Reference no.: 1064979

The King's Arms is a pub at 25 Roupell Street, Waterloo, London SE1.

It is a Grade II listed building, built in the early-mid 19th century.
