= The Old Kings Arms =

Pub in St Albans, Hertfordshire, England

Coordinates: 51.7514°N 0.3420°W

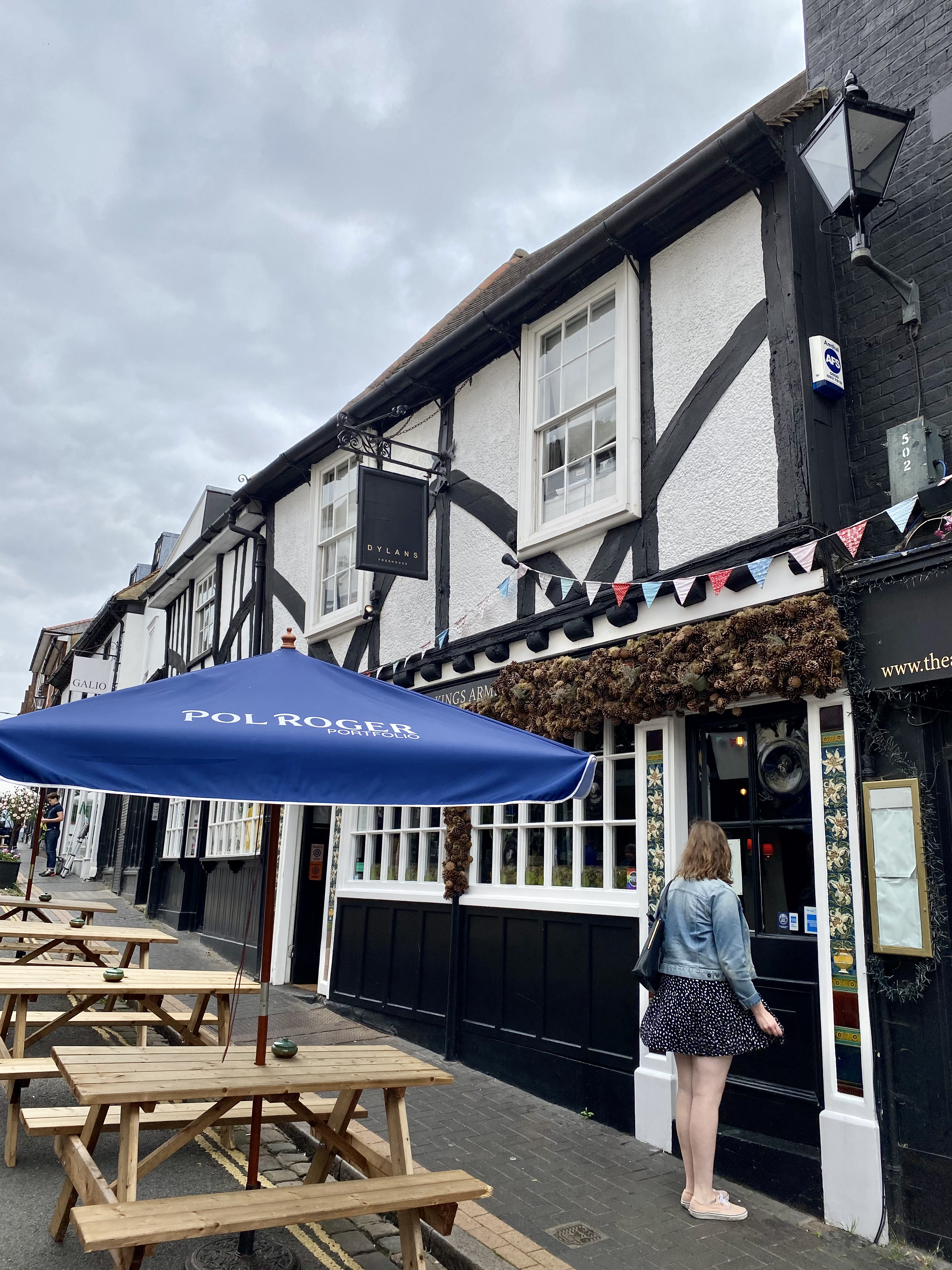
The Old Kings Arms in August 2021

The Old Kings Arms is a public house at 7 George Street, St Albans, Hertfordshire, England. The timber framed building is fifteenth century and is listed Grade II with Historic England.

It was closed for over a decade, before reopening under the name "Dylans" in 2015.
