= Combe Martin =

Village in Devon, England

Coordinates: 51.200°N 04.025°W

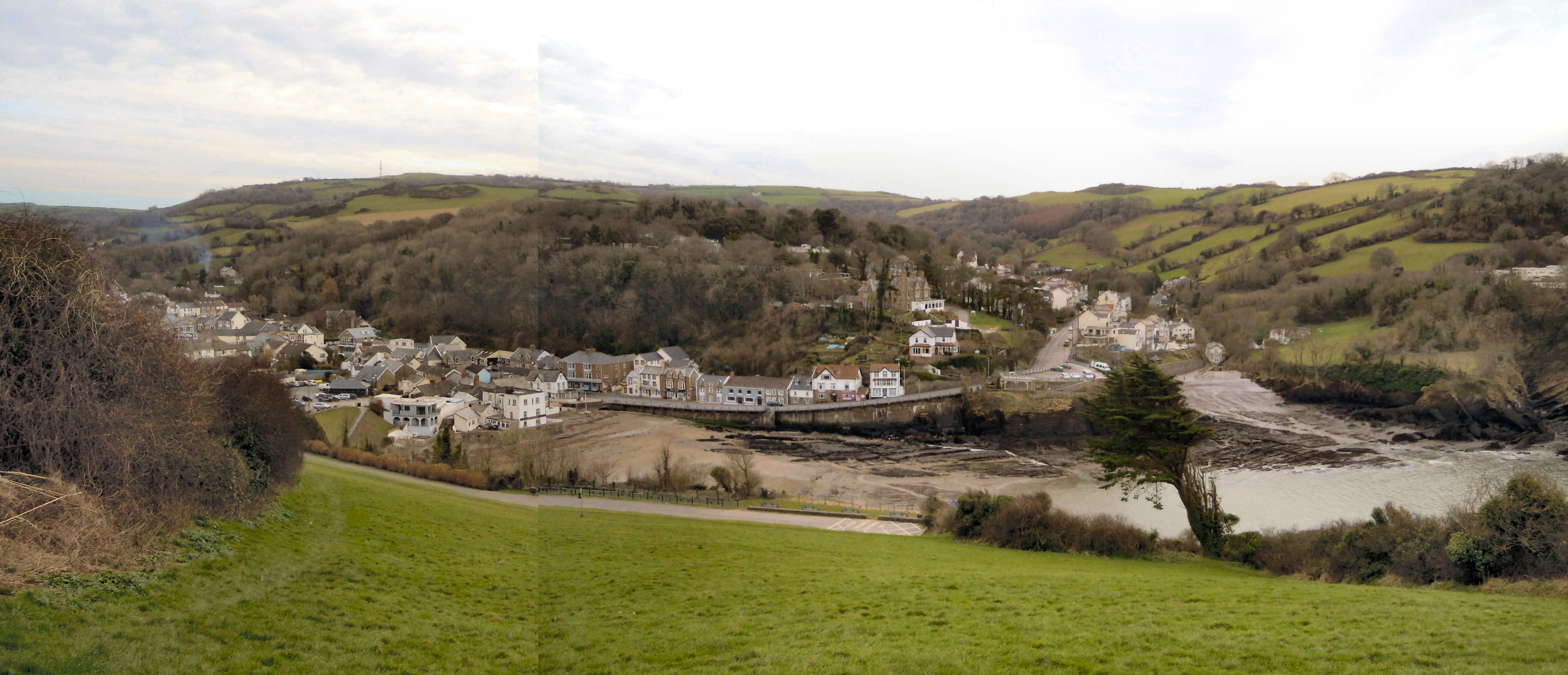
- Combe Martin from Little Hangman

- Location within Devon
- Population: 2,687 (2011 census)
- OS grid reference: SS5846
- Civil parish: Combe Martin
- District: North Devon
- Shire county: Devon
- Region: South West
- Country: England
- Sovereign state: United Kingdom
- Post town: Ilfracombe
- Postcode district: EX34
- Dialling code: 01271
- Police: Devon and Cornwall
- Fire: Devon and Somerset
- Ambulance: South Western
- UK Parliament: North Devon
- Website: Combe Martin Parish Council

Combe Martin (/kuːm ˈmɑːrtɪn/) is a village, civil parish and former manor on the North Devon coast about 4 miles (6.4 km) east of Ilfracombe. It is a small seaside resort with a sheltered cove on the northwest edge of the Exmoor National Park.

Due to the narrowness of the valley, the village consists principally of one single long street which runs 2 miles (3.2 km) between the valley head and the sea. An electoral ward with the village name exists. The ward population at the 2011 census was 3,941.

== History ==
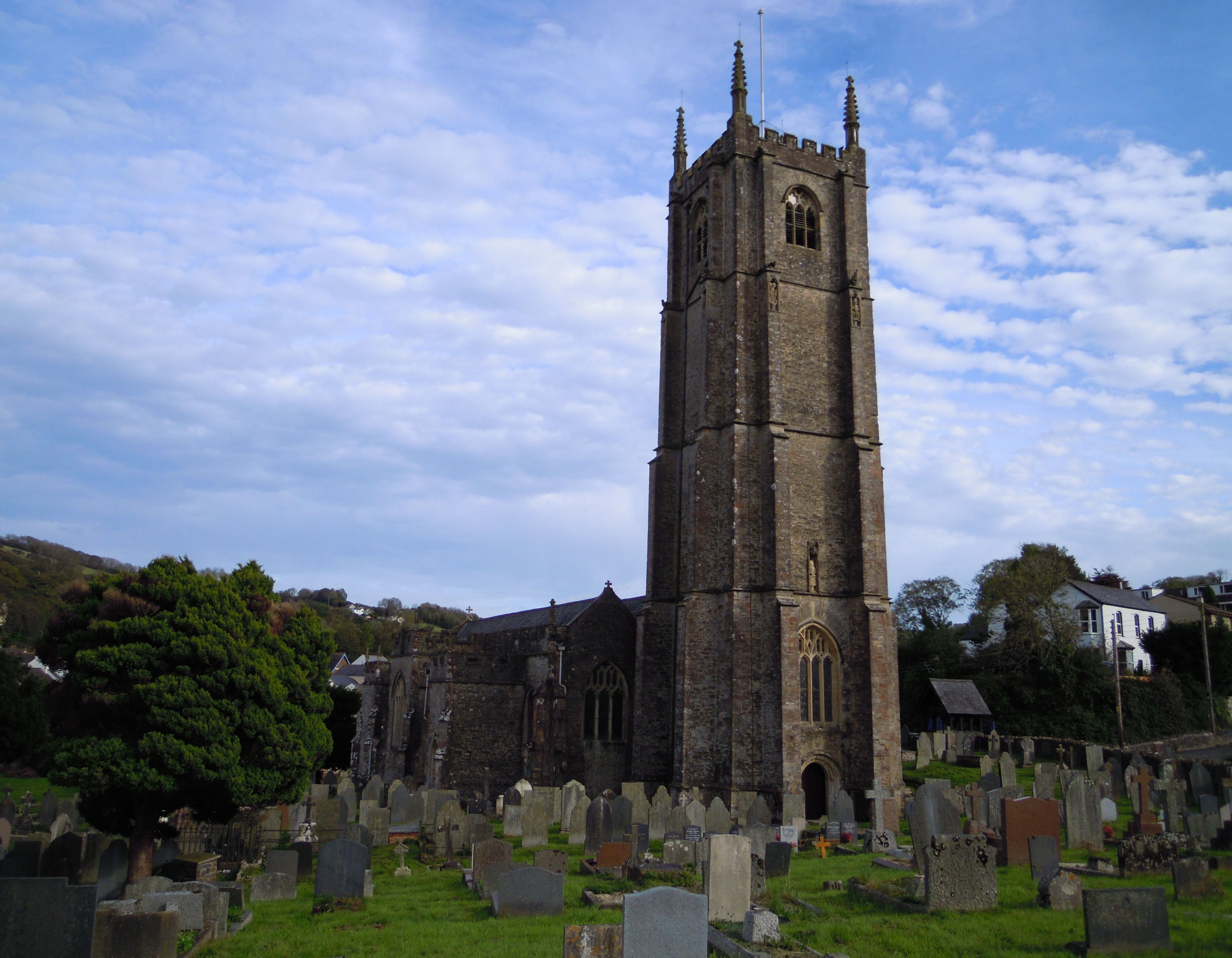
Church of St Peter ad Vincula

Evidence of Iron Age occupation includes the nearby Newberry Castle fort. The toponym "Combe" is derived from Old English cumb meaning "wooded valley". It derives ultimately from the same Brythonic source as the Welsh cwm, Cornish kom also of the same meaning. The name was recorded as Comer in 1128.

The 'Martin' suffix on the place name is from the name of the FitzMartin family, feudal barons of Barnstaple, from which large barony the manor of Combe was held. The FitzMartins held the barony following the marriage of Nicholas FitzMartin (d.1260) to Maud de Tracy, heiress of the barony of Barnstaple, until the death of his grandson William II FitzMartin in 1326 who left his two sisters co-heiresses.

There are several disused silver mines on the eastern ridge and evidence of tunnels can still be seen, as well as the remains of a wheelhouse used to lift ore from the mine. There are items in the Crown Jewels made from Combe Martin silver and a large part of the war expenses of Edward III and Henry V were paid for by the sale of silver mined here.

The unusual dedication of the parish church St Peter ad Vincula to St Peter ad Vincula ("St. Peter in Chains") is derived from the ancient Basilica of San Pietro in Vincoli in Rome.

One of the village's unusual features is the Pack o' Cards public house built around 1700 by George Ley. Reputed to have been funded by his gambling successes, it originally had 52 windows, 13 rooms and four floors (matching the numbers from a pack of cards).

In the 19th century, the village name was spelt as Combmartin.

== Village street ==
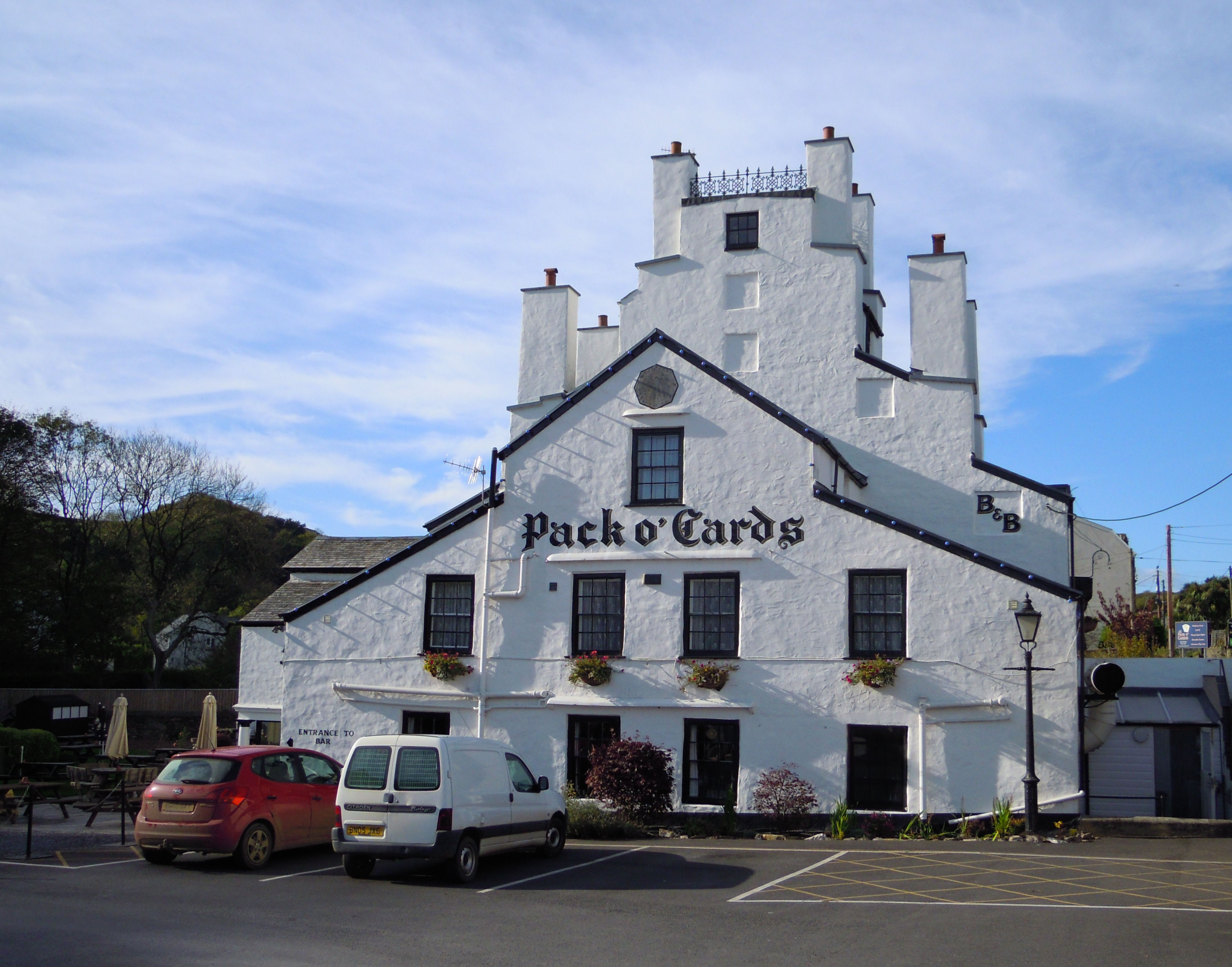
The Pack o' Cards is located on the village street.

It is believed that the street is the longest village street in England, but this is actually a myth. It was recently measured at around a mile and a half long. The actual longest street is Stewkley, Buckinghamshire. The myth has several possible origins:

- Combe Martin has the Guinness world record for the world's longest street party; this can easily be confused as longest village street (or, indeed, the longest high street).
- Many people measure Combe Martin from one "you are entering Combe Martin" sign to the other. One of the signs is placed an unusually long way from the village (approx 1 mile and one half) which can lead to confusion.
- Combe Martin has several very active pubs. There is a saying in Combe Martin that "At the George and Dragon they talk about my sprained thumb, at the Dolphin they talk about my broken leg."

== Annual events ==
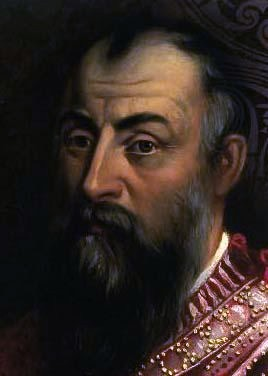
Earl of Tyrone

At one time there were nine pubs: The Castle, The Dolphin, the Fo'c'stle, the George and Dragon, the Lion Inn, The London Inn, The Marine, the Pack o' Cards and the Top George. As part of the annual Carnival celebrations, there was a wheelbarrow race over the length of the village, competitors having to stop at each pub and consume a glass of beer before continuing. In 2008 the wheelbarrow race was replaced by a Fun Run and alcohol free wheelbarrow parade. The wheelbarrow race was reinstated in 2009. The carnival, run in the first week of August, also includes a popular parade where Floats travel down the long high street for many onlookers. One float named the Uncle Tom Cobley has been entered into the parade since 1911.

The annual procession "The Hunting of the Earl of Rone" features the rare hobby horse of England and a character called the Earl of Rone. The Hunting of the Earl of Rone takes place over a weekend, finishing with a two-mile procession along the main street, featuring, as well as the 'obby 'oss and Earl of Rone, a Fool, "Grenadiers", drummers and music, a donkey, and hundreds of dancers in festive dress.

The custom was banned in 1837 (due to 'licentiousness and drunken behaviour') as well as the death of a drunken parishioner falling off a wall during the celebrations. The Rone custom was reconstructed in 1970. Legend has it that the Earl of Tyrone fled Ireland in 1607 and was shipwrecked at Rapparee Beach, in Ilfracombe harbour, to the west of the village. However, he actually made it to Continental Europe. It is an interesting and noisy event which takes place over the Spring Bank Holiday weekend each year.

In early June, a traditional strawberry fayre is held, where stalls are set up to sell local farm produce. Combe Martin was a big producer of strawberries in the past, being sold all over Devon and further afield. Whilst they may not produce many strawberries in the present, the tradition of holding a strawberry fayre remains to celebrate their history. However, other stalls such as charities, crafts and children's entertainment are also usually present. A Farmers Market is also held every 3rd Saturday of the month, which only sells food and is smaller, fitting into the village hall.

== Local attractions ==
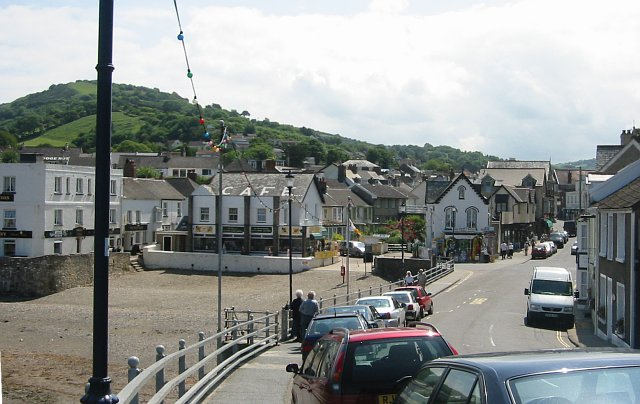
View of Combe Martin, where the village meets the sea

Just to the east of Combe Martin Bay are the Hangman hills, the Hangman cliffs are made up of Little Hangman and the Great Hangman. The Great Hangman is a hog-backed hill of 318m (1043 ft) with a cliff-face of 218m (820 ft), making it the highest cliff in southern Britain, and can be reached by following the South West Coast Path which runs through the village. Combe Martin lies within the North Devon Area of Outstanding Natural Beauty.

The Wildlife and Dinosaur Park is similar to a normal wildlife park, containing animals such as wallabies, free-roaming macaws, wolves and lions, but there are also models and animatronic dinosaurs. The models are in their own area, Domain of the Dinosaurs, whilst the animatronics (T. rex, Dilophosaurus, Megalosaurus and Velociraptor) have an enclosure in the main area of the park. There is also a Dinosaur Museum with a fossilised skeleton and egg nest of some dinosaurs. Other attractions include a train ride with a massive flood of water, shows with sealions and wolves, a light show and a mock Egyptian tomb with hieroglyphics and mummies.

== Notable residents ==
- Clara Larter (1847–1936), botanist
- Damien Hirst, English artist, entrepreneur and art collector lives in a farmhouse near the village.

== See also ==
- North Devon Areas of Outstanding Natural Beauty
