= Black Rat (restaurant) =

Coordinates: 51.057934°N 1.306874°W

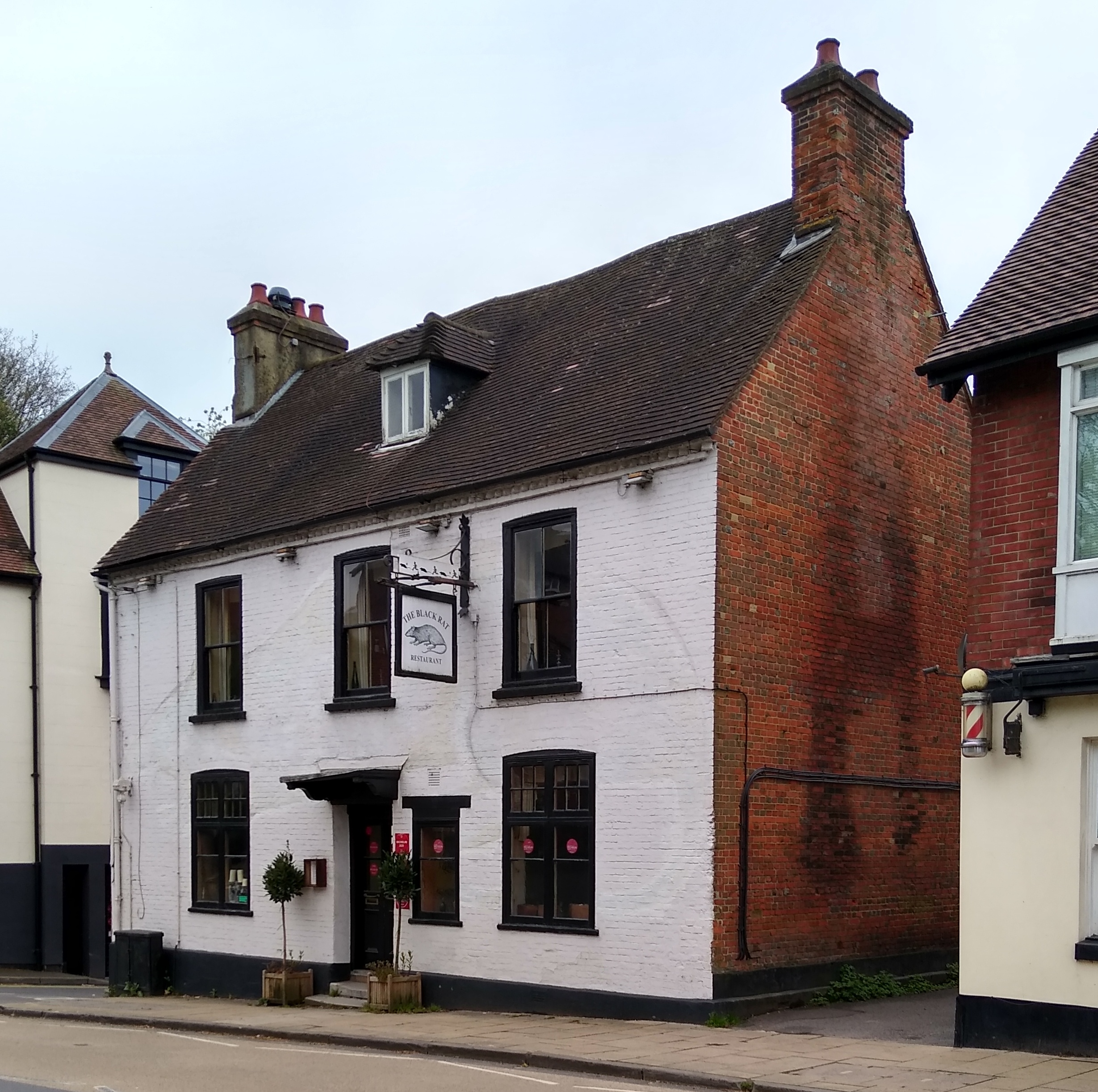
- Interactive map of Black Rat

Restaurant information
- Location: Winchester, Hampshire, England

The Black Rat was a restaurant in Winchester, in Hampshire, England. As of 2021, the restaurant lost its one star in the Michelin Guide that had been held since 2011. The restaurant closed in 2022. It was formerly called "The Kings" and became a Grade II listed building on 14 January 1974, listed as "Kings Arms Public House".

== See also ==
- List of Michelin starred restaurants
