= Pack o' Cards =

Pub and hotel in Combe Martin, Devon, England

Coordinates: 51°12′07″N 4°01′45″W

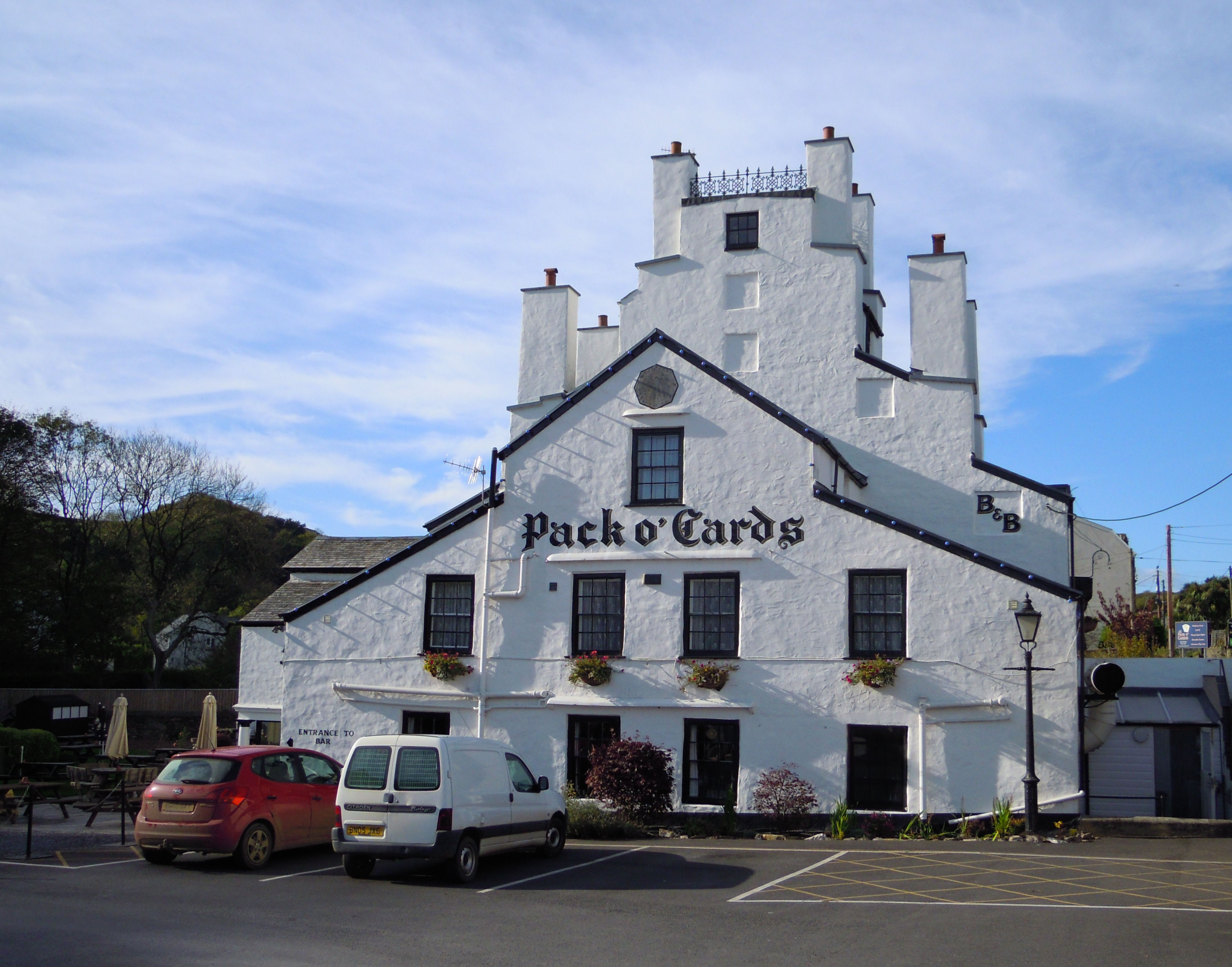
The Pack o' Cards in 2017

The Pack o' Cards is a historic house built about 1690 in Combe Martin in North Devon. Today it is a public house and hotel. It is listed Grade II* on the National Heritage List for England.

Located on the long High Street in Combe Martin, the building was constructed in about 1690 by local squire George Ley, who, it is said, celebrated his good luck at card games when, after winning a large sum of money, he built a house to represent a house of cards on a plot of land measuring 52 × 53 feet, representing the cards in a pack plus the joker. It has four floors representing the four suits, with 13 doors and fireplaces on each floor equaling the number of cards in each suit, and fifty-two stairs. Before the imposition of the window tax, the panes in all the windows added up to the total value of a pack of cards.

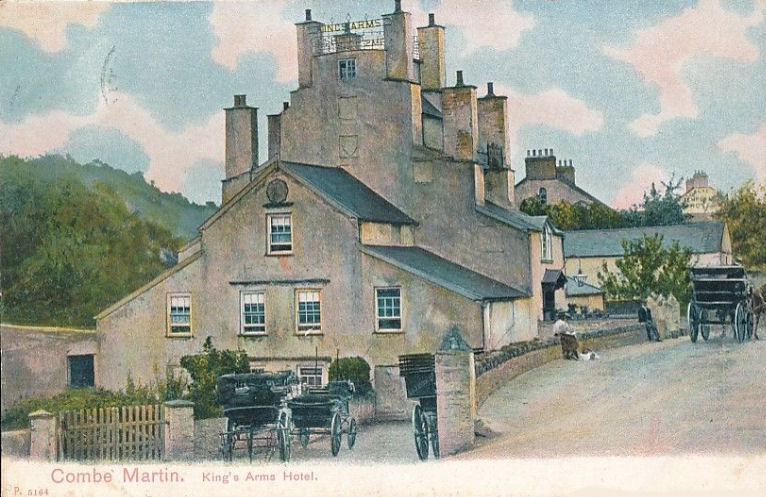
As The King's Arms Inn c.1905

Eventually the house passed out of the hands of the Ley family, but it is not certain when exactly the building became an inn. Records show that it was serving that function early in the 19th century, when in 1822 it was called the King's Arms Inn and a Jane Huxtable was the landlady. It was offered for sale in 1831 by the same name. The hotel is said to have been visited by the author Marie Corelli, who supposedly wrote part of her novel The Mighty Atom (1896) in the "Corelli Room" on the third floor, at a desk still preserved in her room. The inn was renamed the Pack o' Cards on 1 June 1933, but it had probably been known by that name for many years before that date.

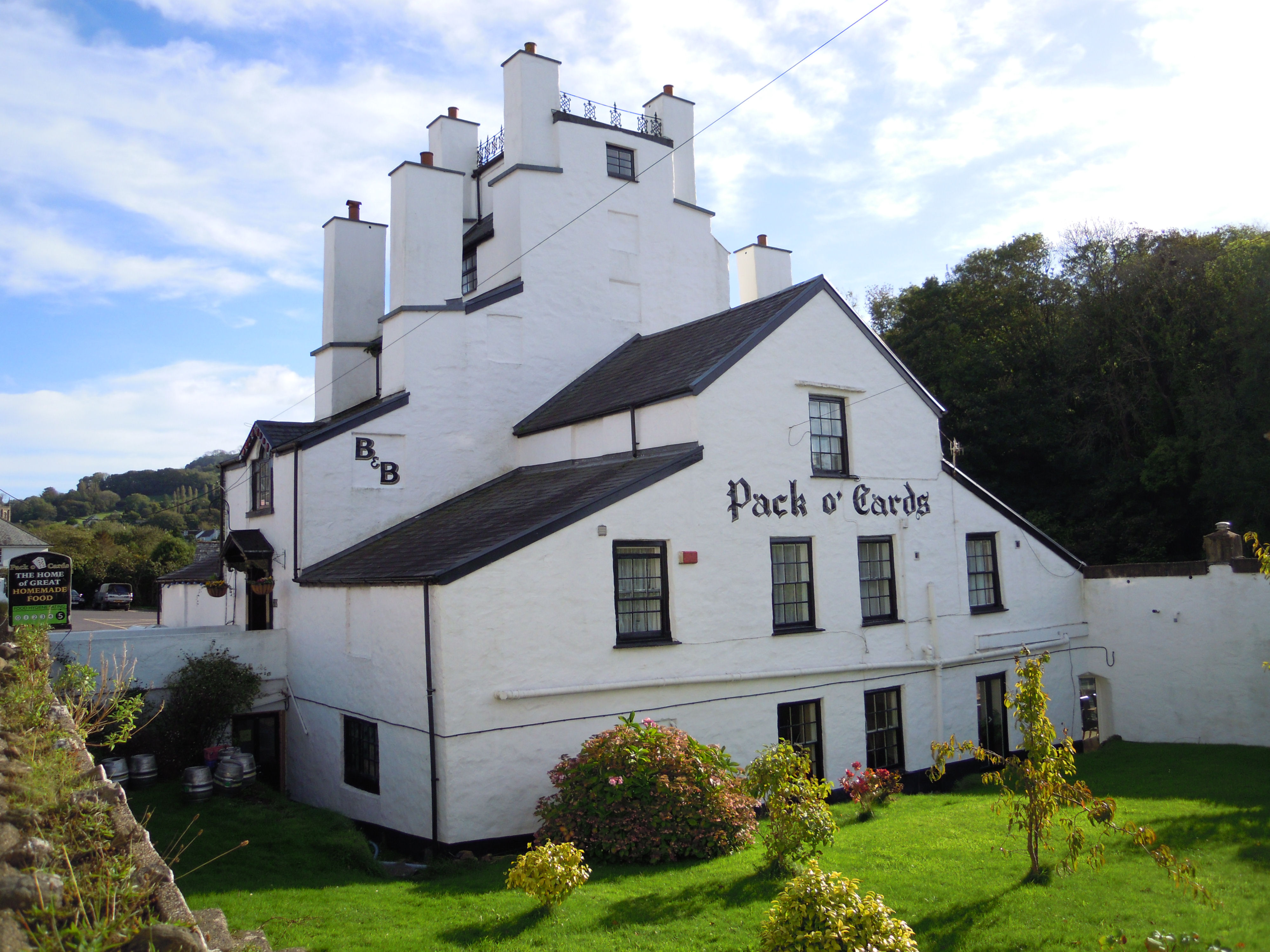
Rear view of the Pack o' Cards

In spite of 20th-century alterations, much of the joinery and moulded cornices in the ground floor have survived. The first and second floors are largely original and untouched, with decorative plaster ceilings to the main first floor room in the left-hand wing and to the through-corridor. Both corridors are panelled, as is the central room on the third floor, where Marie Corelli is said to have stayed. All the principal rooms have moulded plaster cornices, while good quality panelled joinery survives throughout the building. Nikolaus Pevsner describes it as the only noteworthy building in the village, being "a rare folly, built on a cruciform plan with a towering display of symmetrically grouped chimneys, eight together". The hotel featured on The Paul Daniels Magic Show on BBC television in 1987.

The Pack o' Cards remains an inn and has been a Grade II* listed building since 1953.

== Gallery ==
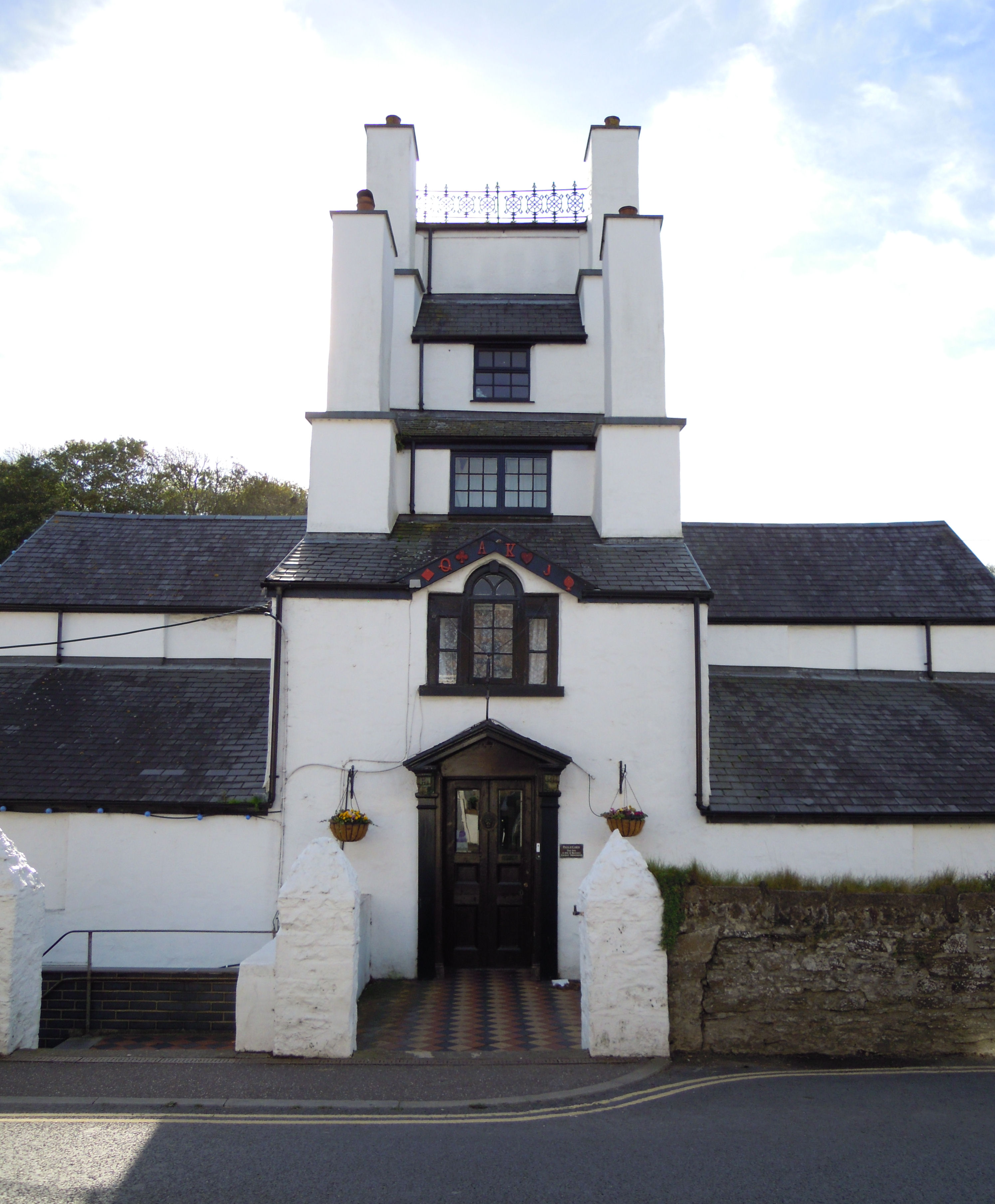
The side entrance to the Pack o' Cards

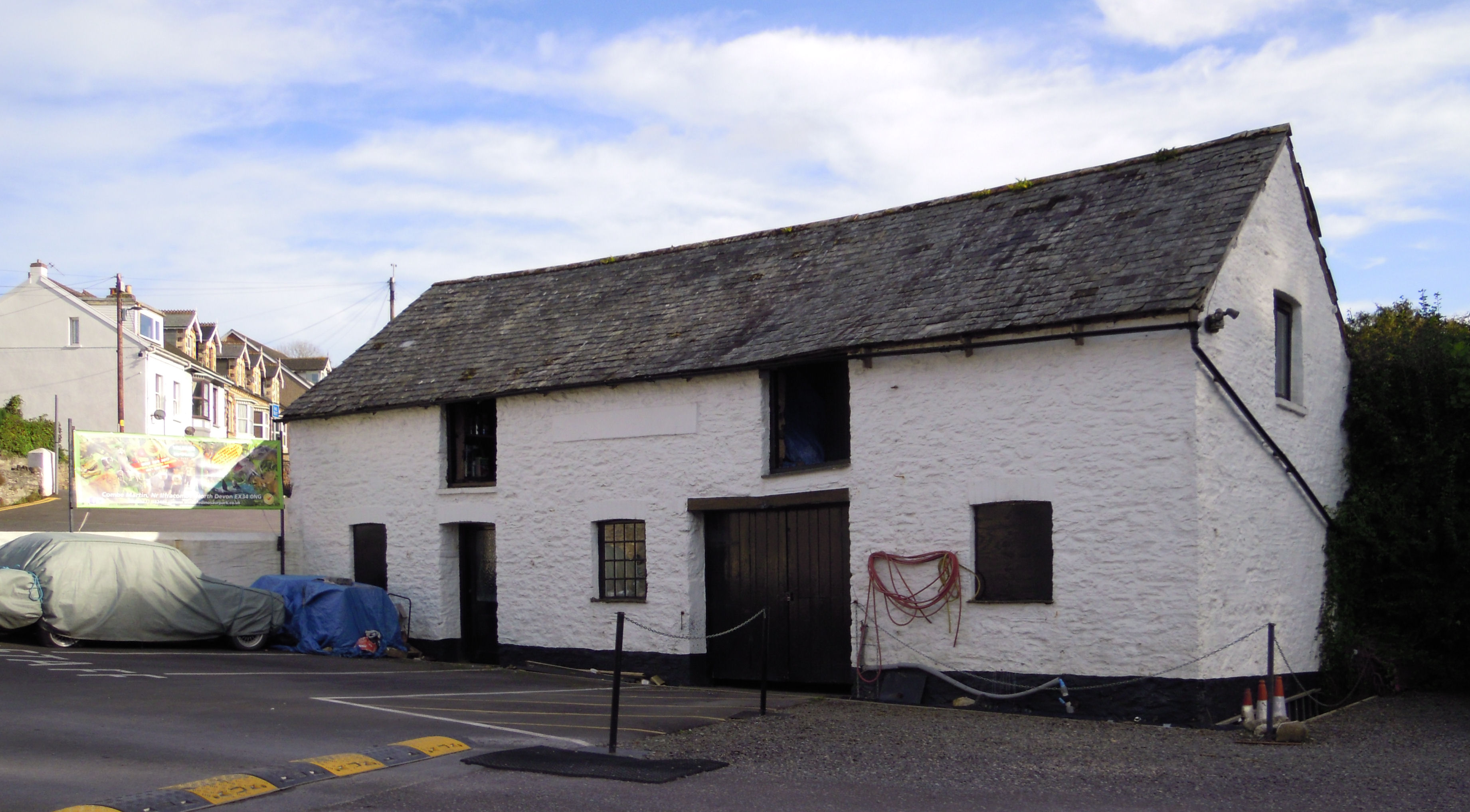
The original Coach House
