= Grade II listed buildings in the London Borough of Hillingdon =

This page is a list of classified buildings Grade IIs in the London Borough of Hillingdon.

Name	Location	Type	Completed (Note: The date given is the date used by Historic England as significant for the initial building or that of an important part in the structure's description.)	Date designated	Grid ref. (Note: Sometimes known as OSGB36, the grid reference is based on the British national grid reference system used by the Ordnance Survey.) Geo-coordinates	Entry number (Note: The "List Entry Number" is a unique number assigned to each listed building and scheduled monument by Historic England.)	Image
The Angel, Hayes	697 Uxbridge Road, Hayes, Middlesex, UB4 8HX.	Pub	1926	13 February 2015	TQ0878681832; 51°31′30″N 0°26′00″W	1422617	The Angel, Hayes More images
Black Horse, Eastcote	High Road, Eastcote	Pub	early 19th century	6 September 1974	TQ1047788489; 51°35′04″N 0°24′24″W	1358380	Upload Photo
Brunel University lecture centre	Brunel University, Cleveland Road, Uxbridge	Academic building	1966 or 1967	23 June 2011	TQ0602382688; 51°31′59″N 0°28′22″W	1400162	Brunel University lecture centre More images
Case is Altered, Eastcote	Southill Lane, Eastcote, London	Pub	16th century	6 September 1974	TQ1068988985; 51°35′20″N 0°24′13″W	1358392	Case is Altered, Eastcote More images
The Crown, Cowley	High Street, Cowley, London	Pub	16th century	6 September 1974	TQ0538682437; 51°31′51″N 0°28′56″W	1080230	The Crown, Cowley More images
Eastcote tube station	Field End Road	Tube station	4 July 1904	17 May 1994	TQ1117787630; 51°34′36″N 0°23′49″W	1358405	Eastcote tube station More images
Highgrove House, Eastcote	Highgrove House, High Road	House	1750	26 November 1975	TQ1041788230; 51°34′54″N 0°24′28″W	1080110	Highgrove House, Eastcote More images
Hillingdon Sports and Leisure Complex	Gatting Way, Park Road, Uxbridge	Leisure centre	1935	30 March 1993	TQ0634284677; 51°33′04″N 0°28′03″W	1442596	Hillingdon Sports and Leisure Complex More images
Ickenham Hall	Ickenham Hall, Glebe Avenue	Georgian mansion	1624	6 September 1974	TQ0817585954; 51°33′44″N 0°26′27″W	1286099	Ickenham Hall More images
Longford Meeting House	Longford Cottage, Bath Road, Longford	Cottage	16th-century	6 September 1974	TQ0529476903; 51°28′53″N 0°29′06″W	1286577	Longford Meeting House More images
Polish War Memorial	West End Road	Memorial	1948	30 August 2002	TQ1101984541; 51°32′56″N 0°24′01″W	1088113	Polish War Memorial More images
Queen's Head, Uxbridge	54 Windsor Street, Uxbridge, London	Pub		6 September 1974	TQ0549084102; 51°32′45″N 0°28′48″W	1358443	Queen's Head, Uxbridge More images
Randalls of Uxbridge	Vine Street	Building	1938	31 October 2008	TQ0565883957; 51°32′41″N 0°28′40″W	1393206	Randalls of Uxbridge More images
Red Lion, Hillingdon	Royal Lane	Pub	1800	8 May 1950	TQ0681082896; 51°32′06″N 0°27′40″W	1358389	Red Lion, Hillingdon More images
Ruislip tube station		Tube station	1904	4 August 2000	TQ0951187027; 51°34′17″N 0°25′16″W	1380983	Ruislip tube station More images \
St Catherine's Church, West Drayton	The Green, West Drayton	Church	1869	12 May 2016	TQ0557484063; 51°30′15″N 0°28′35″W	1428695	St Catherine's Church, West Drayton More images
The Shovel, Cowley	Iver Lane, Cowley, London	Public house	19th century	6 September 1974	TQ0514682289; 51°31′47″N 0°29′08″W	1080185	The Shovel, Cowley More images
Three Tuns, Uxbridge	24 High Street, Uxbridge, London	Pub	16th and 17th centuries	3 April 1973	TQ0557484063; 51°32′44″N 0°28′44″W	1285689	Three Tuns, Uxbridge More images
Uxbridge tube station	163-174, High Street	Tube station	1930	12 January 1983	TQ0559984143; 51°32′45″N 0°28′42″W	1358405	Uxbridge tube station More images

== See also ==
- Grade I and II* listed buildings in the London Borough of Hillingdon
