= William Eves =

British architect (1867–1950)

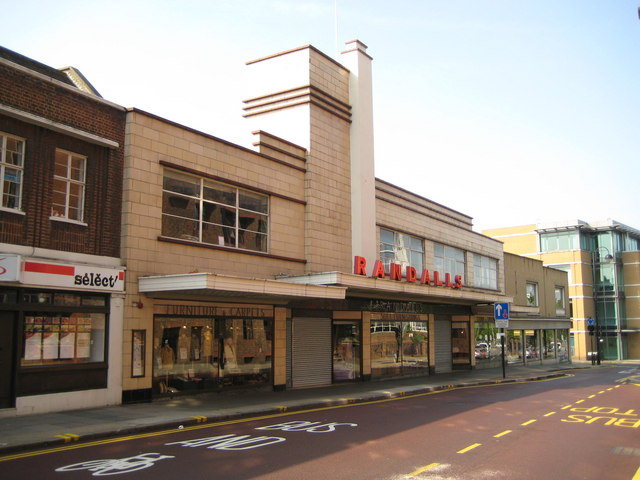
Randalls of Uxbridge, 2008

William Lionel Eves MBE FRIBA (1867 – 19 April 1950), was a British architect, and the designer of the Grade II listed building Randalls of Uxbridge.

== Background ==
Eves was born in Uxbridge, the son of fellow architect George Eves (1816–1892), and succeeded him as the surveyor for the Allen Estate in Kensington, London. He died in Uxbridge on 19 April 1950, aged 82 years, leaving £15,961 10s 7d (equivalent to £1,857,773.95 in 2025). Among his bequests were several family heirlooms, including his great grandfather's gold chronometer watch, his family bible, a 1584 Bishop's Bible, "leather-bound in oak boards", and a silver salver which had been presented to him by Uxbridge Urban Council.

== Career ==
Eves' architectural practice was based at 54 High Street, Uxbridge, and he designed Ilchester Mansions, Earls Court, and remodelled the frontage of the Allen Estate's properties on Kensington High Street between 1894 and 1935. He designed numerous buildings in the Uxbridge area.

== Awards ==
In the 1939 New Year Honours, William Lionel Eves, Architect to the Uxbridge Urban District Council was made a Member of the Order of the British Empire (MBE).
