= Grade I and II* listed buildings in the London Borough of Hillingdon =

There are over 9,000 Grade I listed buildings and 20,000 Grade II* listed buildings in England. This page is a list of these buildings in the London Borough of Hillingdon.

== Grade I ==
Name	Location	Type	Completed (Note: The date given is the date used by Historic England as significant for the initial building or that of an important part in the structure's description.)	Date designated	Grid ref. (Note: Sometimes known as OSGB36, the grid reference is based on the British national grid reference system used by the Ordnance Survey.) Geo-coordinates	Entry number (Note: The "List Entry Number" is a unique number assigned to each listed building and scheduled monument by Historic England.)	Image
Breakspear House	Harefield, Hillingdon	House	Early-mid 17th century	8 May 1950	TQ0607989641; 51°35′44″N 0°28′12″W	1080262	Breakspear House More images
Church of St Martin of Tours	Ruislip, Hillingdon	Parish Church	Mid 13th century	24 January 1950	TQ0915387604; 51°34′36″N 0°25′34″W	1285697	Church of St Martin of Tours More images
Church of St Mary	Harefield, Hillingdon	Parish Church	12th century	8 May 1950	TQ0533389586; 51°35′43″N 0°28′51″W	1358363	Church of St Mary More images
Church of St Peter and St Paul	Harlington, Hillingdon	Parish Church	12th century	27 May 1949	TQ0880078214; 51°29′33″N 0°26′03″W	1080163	Church of St Peter and St Paul More images
Group Operations Room	RAF Uxbridge, Hillingdon	Underground Military Headquarters	1938–1939	1 December 2005	TQ0654883514; 51°32′26″N 0°27′54″W	1392556	Group Operations Room More images
Ickenham Manor	Ickenham, Hillingdon	Hall House	LATE MEDIEVAL	8 May 1950	TQ0829385329; 51°33′23″N 0°26′22″W	1080187	Upload Photo
Manor Farm Barn (to West of Church of St Mary)	Harmondsworth, Hillingdon	Tithe Barn	LATE MEDIEVAL	1 March 1950	TQ0563277848; 51°29′23″N 0°28′48″W	1194332	Manor Farm Barn (to West of Church of St Mary) More images
Outbuildings to North of Swakeleys	Ickenham, Hillingdon	Courtyard		6 September 1974	TQ0742885753; 51°33′38″N 0°27′06″W	1286571	Outbuildings to North of Swakeleys
Swakeleys	Ickenham, Hillingdon	House	1629–1638	1 May 1956	TQ0742185706; 51°33′36″N 0°27′06″W	1080295	Swakeleys More images

== Grade II* ==
Name	Location	Type	Completed	Date designated	Grid ref. Geo-coordinates	Entry number	Image
Almshouses	Harefield, Hillingdon	Almshouse	16th century	8 May 1950	TQ0515689824; 51°35′51″N 0°29′00″W	1358364	Almshouses More images
Cedars House	Hillingdon, Hillingdon	House	c. 1580	8 May 1950	TQ0694883003; 51°32′09″N 0°27′34″W	1284903	Upload Photo
Church of St Dunstan	Cranford, Hillingdon	Church	13th century	27 May 1949	TQ1016078179; 51°29′31″N 0°24′53″W	1181190	Church of St Dunstan More images
Church of St Giles	Ickenham, Hillingdon	Parish Church	Late 14th century	8 May 1950	TQ0795086264; 51°33′54″N 0°26′38″W	1080229	Church of St Giles More images
Church of St John	Hillingdon, Hillingdon	Parish Church	13th century	8 May 1950	TQ0691482916; 51°32′06″N 0°27′36″W	1080160	Church of St John More images
Church of St Laurence	Cowley, Hillingdon	Parish Church	12th century	8 May 1950	TQ0599482043; 51°31′38″N 0°28′24″W	1286371	Church of St Laurence More images
Church of St Margaret	Uxbridge	14th-15th century	1985–88	8 May 1950	TQ0552584099; 51°32′45″N 0°28′47″W	1180516	Church of St Margaret More images
Church of St Martin	West Drayton, Hillingdon	Parish Church	13th century	1 March 1950	TQ0616379542; 51°30′17″N 0°28′18″W	1358325	Church of St Martin More images
Church of St Mary	Hayes, Hillingdon	Parish Church	13th century	27 May 1949	TQ0970881077; 51°31′05″N 0°25′13″W	1080233	Church of St Mary More images
Church of St Mary, Harmondsworth	Harmondsworth, Hillingdon	Parish Church	12th century	1 March 1950	TQ0569577808; 51°29′22″N 0°28′45″W	1080201	Church of St Mary, Harmondsworth More images
Discotheque Royle	Hillingdon	Cinema	1930–31	15 November 1976	TQ0589583954; 51°32′40″N 0°28′28″W	1080111	Discotheque Royle More images
Dovecote to North West of Breakspear House	Harefield, Hillingdon	Dovecote	17th century	4 July 1968	TQ0601689692; 51°35′46″N 0°28′15″W	1080263	Upload Photo
Footbridge Across River Colne, to North of Denham Court	Denham Court, Hillingdon	Footbridge	c. 1850	30 June 1986	TQ0515587329; 51°34′30″N 0°29′02″W	1065962	Footbridge Across River Colne, to North of Denham Court
Fray's Cottage Old Mill House	West Drayton, Hillingdon	House	Late 18th century	1 March 1950	TQ0542979082; 51°30′03″N 0°28′57″W	1181607	Fray's Cottage Old Mill House More images
Great Barn to West of Manor Farm Yard	Ruislip	Barn	Late 17th century or 18th century	6 September 1974	TQ0897787755; 51°34′41″N 0°25′43″W	1358359	Great Barn to West of Manor Farm Yard More images
Green End	Northwood, Hillingdon	House	17th century	14 September 1993	TQ0895391704; 51°36′49″N 0°25′40″W	1065964	Upload Photo
Harefield Park	Harefield, Hillingdon	House	EARLY-MID 18th century	6 September 1974	TQ0493390841; 51°36′24″N 0°29′10″W	1080177	Harefield Park More images
Heinz buildings	Hayes, Hillingdon	Commercial Office: full name: Heinz Administrative Headquarters and Former Research Laboratories	Mid 20th century	24 November 1995	TQ0887582471; 51°31′50″N 0°25′55″W	1242724	Heinz buildings
Hillingdon Court	Hillingdon, Hillingdon	Country House	1854-8	16 August 1983	TQ0684883829; 51°32′36″N 0°27′38″W	1080114	Upload Photo
Mount Vernon Hospital Chapel	Northwood	Chapel	1904	6 September 1974	TQ0785991779; 51°36′52″N 0°26′37″W	1358386	Mount Vernon Hospital Chapel More images
No. 9-15 High Street	Ruislip	Continuous Jetty House	16th century	24 January 1950	TQ0912487593; 51°34′36″N 0°25′36″W	1080204	No. 9-15 High Street
Southlands	West Drayton, Hillingdon	House	Early 18th century	1 March 1950	TQ0588779170; 51°30′06″N 0°28′33″W	1286038	Southlands More images
Crown and Treaty Inn	Uxbridge	Inn	1576	8 May 1950	TQ0519884529; 51°32′59″N 0°29′03″W	1080148	Crown and Treaty Inn More images
The Frays	West Drayton, Hillingdon	House	Late 16th century	6 September 1974	TQ0554679319; 51°30′11″N 0°28′51″W	1358349	Upload Photo
The Market House	Uxbridge	Market House	1788	8 May 1950	TQ0553784107; 51°32′46″N 0°28′46″W	1080208	The Market House More images
The Old Gatehouse	West Drayton, Hillingdon	Manor House	Early 16th century	1 March 1950	TQ0617179491; 51°30′16″N 0°28′18″W	1193001	The Old Gatehouse More images
Walls south of Old Gatehouse etc.	West Drayton, Hillingdon: full name: Wall Running South from the Old Gatehouse and West Along Front of Gatehouse Nurseries	Wall	Early 16th century	6 September 1974	TQ0615579469; 51°30′15″N 0°28′19″W	1358326	Walls south of Old Gatehouse etc. More images
Walls around St Martin's	West Drayton, Hillingdon	Wall: full name: Walls Around Saint Martin's Churchyard	16th century	6 September 1974	TQ0618579549; 51°30′18″N 0°28′17″W	1286366	Walls around St Martin's More images
Walls of Cooombe House	West Drayton, Hillingdon: full name: Walls to East and South of Garden of Number 28 (coombe House)	Wall	Early 16th century	6 September 1974	TQ0609579466; 51°30′15″N 0°28′22″W	1193014	Walls of Cooombe House More images

== See also ==
- Grade II listed buildings in the London Borough of Hillingdon
