= E. Norman Bailey =

British architect

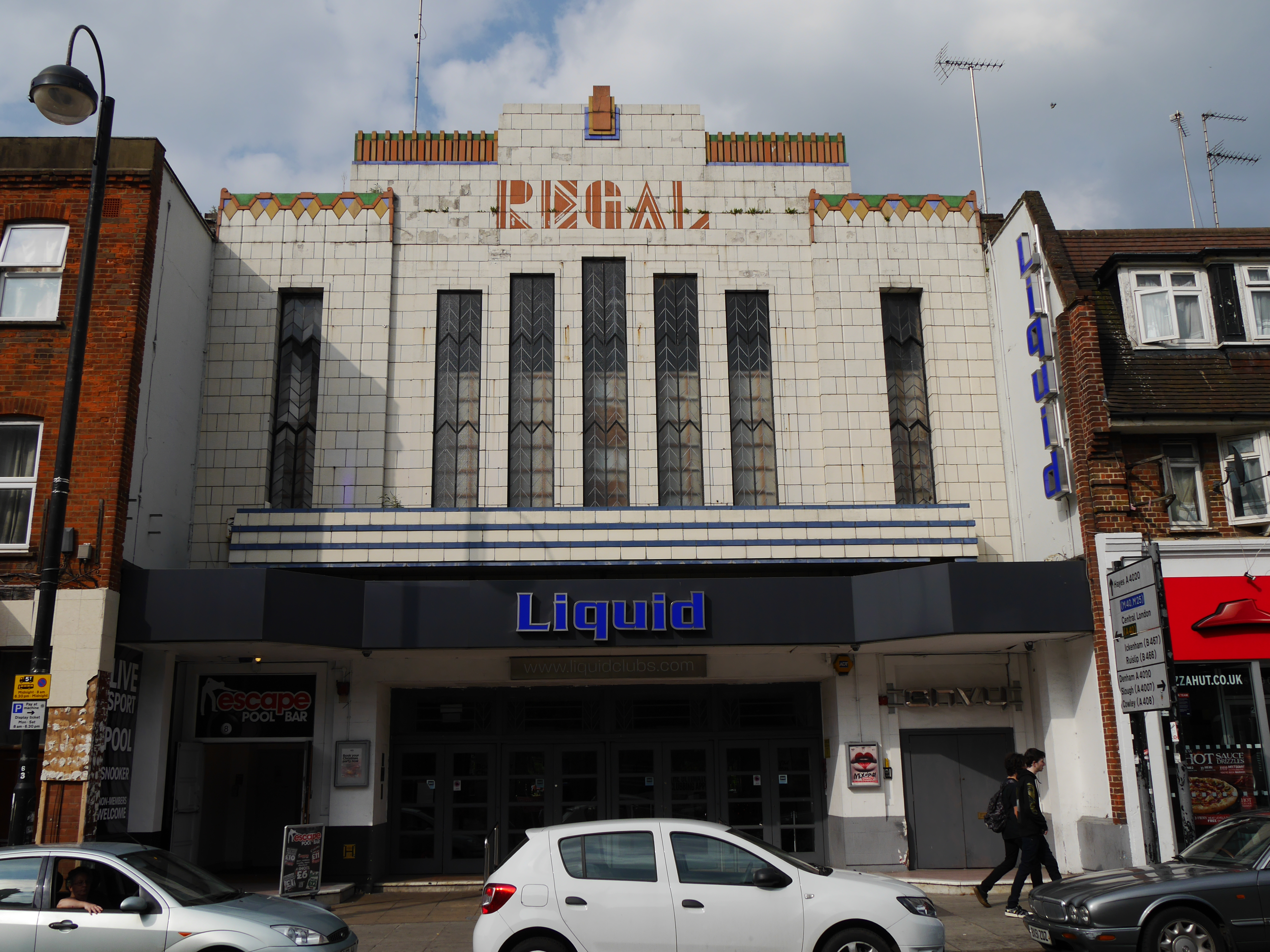
The former Regal Cinema, Uxbridge, 2016

Eric Norman Bailey was a British architect, particularly of cinemas.

Bailey designed the Showboat Roadhouse in Maidenhead in the moderne style, specifically intended as a destination for motorists. The Showboat was demolished in January 2019.

Bailey designed at least eleven cinemas in London and the south-east of England, all of which are now closed or demolished.

The Regal Cinema in an Egyptian Revival architectural style in Uxbridge, a Grade II* listed building, built in 1930-31, is considered his best work. The author David Atwell calls it, "one of the most highly developed exercises in Art Deco attempted in any cinema", and Historic England call it, "the finest surviving work of the cinema architect E Norman Bailey".
