= Shovel (disambiguation) =

Shovel may refer to:

- Shovel, a tool for lifting and moving loose material
- Power shovel, a bucket equipped machine, usually electrically powered, used for digging and loading earth or fragmented rock material, the modern equivalent of steam shovels
- Steam shovel, a steam-powered excavating machine designed for lifting and moving material such as rock and soil
- Intellipedia shovel
- The Shovel, Cowley, a Grade II listed public house at Iver Lane, Cowley, London
- Shovel (album)

== See also ==
- Sir Cloudesley Shovell (1650 – 1707)
- Shovel Knight, a video game created by Yacht Club Games
- Shuvel, a defunct nu-metal band from Wichita, Kansas
