= Uxbridge power station =

Power station in London, England

- Country: England
- Location: Uxbridge
- Coordinates: 51°36′36″N 00°29′15″W
- Status: Decommissioned and demolished
- Construction began: 1900
- Commission date: 1902
- Decommission date: 1963
- Owners: Uxbridge and District Electric Supply Company Limited (1899–1948), British Electricity Authority (1948–55), Central Electricity Authority (1955–57), Central Electricity Generating Board (1958–63)
- Operators: Uxbridge and District Electric Supply Company Limited (1899–1948), British Electricity Authority (1948–55), Central Electricity Authority (1955–57), Central Electricity Generating Board (1958–63)

Thermal power station
- Primary fuel: Coal
- Turbine technology: reciprocating engines and steam turbines
- Cooling source: Canal water

Power generation
- Nameplate capacity: 4 MW
- Annual net output: 10038 MWh (1923)

Uxbridge power station supplied electricity to the District of Uxbridge and the surrounding area from 1902 to 1962. The power station was built by the Uxbridge and District Electric Supply Company Limited which operated it until the nationalisation of the British electricity supply industry in 1948.

== History ==
The Uxbridge and District Electric Supply Company Limited was established in 1899 as a local enterprise to obtain provisional orders under the Electric Lighting Acts to generate and supply electricity to the District of Uxbridge. The Uxbridge and District Electricity Supply Order 1900 was granted by the Board of Trade and was confirmed by Parliament through the Electric Lighting Orders Confirmation (No. 12) Act 1900 (63 & 64 Vict. c. clxx). Further Provisional Orders were obtained in 1903 and 1906.

The company was formed with capital of £1,000. By 1908 the capital amounted to £75,000, in 1911 the company issued further stock of £75,000. The directors in 1911 were: Charles H McEuen (Director); Theodor Petersen (Assistant Manager); James O. Callender (Assistant Manager).

The power station in Waterloo Road Uxbridge (51°32′32″N 0°29′15″W) began to supply electricity in May 1902. The site was adjacent to the Grand Union Canal for delivery of coal by barge and for cooling water.

The Central Electricity Board built the first stages of the National Grid between 1927 and 1933. Uxbridge power station was connected to the 132 kV electricity grid.

In 1913 the electricity supply area included Greenford Urban District (UD); Hayes UD; Uxbridge UD; Uxbridge Rural District (RD); and Yiewsley UD. By 1936 the supply area included: Amersham RD; Beaconsfield UD; Ealing Metropolitan Borough (MB); Eton RD; Harrow UD; Hayes & Harlington UD; Ruislip-Northwood UD; Southall MB; and Yiewsley and West Drayton UD.

The British electricity supply industry was nationalised in 1948 under the provisions of the Electricity Act 1947 (10 & 11 Geo. 6. c. 54). The Uxbridge and District Electric Supply Company Limited was abolished, ownership of Uxbridge power station were vested in the British Electricity Authority, and subsequently the Central Electricity Authority and the Central Electricity Generating Board (CEGB). At the same time the electricity distribution and sales responsibilities of the Uxbridge and District Electric Supply Company Limited were transferred to the South Eastern Electricity Board (SEEBOARD).

Following nationalisation Uxbridge power station became part of the Uxbridge electricity supply district, covering an area of 69 square miles (179 km^{2}).

Uxbridge power station was closed in 1963.

== Equipment specification ==
=== Plant in 1913 & 1919 ===
The capacity and output of the generating plant at Uxbridge power station in 1913 and 1919 was as shown.

Generating plant 1913 & 1919
Year	1913	1919
Capacity of plant, kW	1,100	3,600
Connections, kW	2,098	4,347
Maximum Load, kW	550	1,625

=== Plant in 1923 ===
By 1923 the plant at Uxbridge comprised boilers delivering a total of 105,000 lb/h (13.2 kg/s) of steam to:

- 1 × 200 kW reciprocating engine generating alternating current (AC)
- 2 × 300 kW reciprocating engine generating AC
- 1 × 650 kW turbo-alternator generating AC
- 2 × 1,000 kW turbo-alternator generating AC
- 1 × 1,500 kW turbo-alternator generating AC

The total generating capacity was 4,950 kW.

=== Plant in 1936 ===
The plant data for 1936 was:

Capacity of plant, kW	4,850
Connections, kW	123,629
Maximum Load, kW	22,648

=== Plant in 1954 ===
By 1954 the plant comprised:

- Boilers:
  - 5 × Babcock and Wilcox marine boilers total evaporative capacity was 81,000 lb/h (10.2 kg/s), steam conditions were 200 psi and 600 °F (13.8 bar and 315 °C), steam was supplied to:
- Generators:
  - 2 × 1.1 MW Brush-Ljungstrom turbo-alternators, 3-phase, 50 Hz, 6,600 volts
  - 1 × 1.8 MW Brush-Ljungstrom turbo-alternators, 3-phase, 50 Hz, 6,600 volts

The total installed generating capacity was 4 MW.

== Operations ==
=== Operating data 1913 and 1919 ===
Operating data for Uxbridge power station in 1913 and 1919 was:

Year	1913	1919
Electricity generated, MWh	1,266	4,532
Number of customers	714	1,312
Electricity supply	200 V 400 V AC	

=== Operating data 1921–23 ===
The electricity supply data for the period 1921–23 was:

Uxbridge power station supply data 1921–23
Electricity Use	Units	Year		
Electricity Use	Units	1921	1922	1923
Lighting and domestic	MWh	821.7	988.7	1,227.8
Public lighting	MWh	8.4	11.0	17.3
Traction	MWh	0	0	0
Power	MWh	2,870	3,327	6,286
Bulk supply	MWh	1,257	3,520	2,506
Total use	MWh	4,957	7,847	10,038

Electricity Loads on the system were:

Year		1921	1922	1923
Maximum load	kW	3,280	4,320	5,218
Total connections	kW	6,860	8,001	10,398
Load factor	Per cent	21.8	26.8	27.2

Revenue from the sale of current (in 1923) was £99,106; the surplus of revenue over expenses was £49,470

=== Operating data 1931–36 ===
Operating data for the station over the period 1931–36 was.

Year	Electricity sold MWh	Electricity generated MWh	Number of customers
1931	33,569	2,970	
1932			
1933	39,636		
1934	46,898		
1935	52,915		
1936	65,312	2,963	37,501

=== Operating data 1946 ===
In 1946 Uxbridge power station supplied 932.08 MWh of electricity; the maximum output load was 5,700 kW.

=== Operating data 1954–63 ===
Operating data for the period 1954–63 was:

Uxbridge power station operating data, 1954–63
Year	Running hours, or (load as % of max capacity)	Max output capacity MW	Electricity supplied MWh	Thermal efficiency per cent
1954	261	4	513	3.88
1955	476	4	1,197	5.99
1956	311	4	752	2.15
1957	159	4	271	3.28
1958	161	4	316	3.48
1961	(0.3%)	4	97	3.07
1962	(0.4%)	4	128	3.81

Electricity output of Uxbridge power station, MWh

== See also ==
- Timeline of the UK electricity supply industry
- List of power stations in England
