= Queen's Head, Uxbridge =

Pub in Uxbridge, London

Coordinates: 51°32′45″N 0°28′48″W

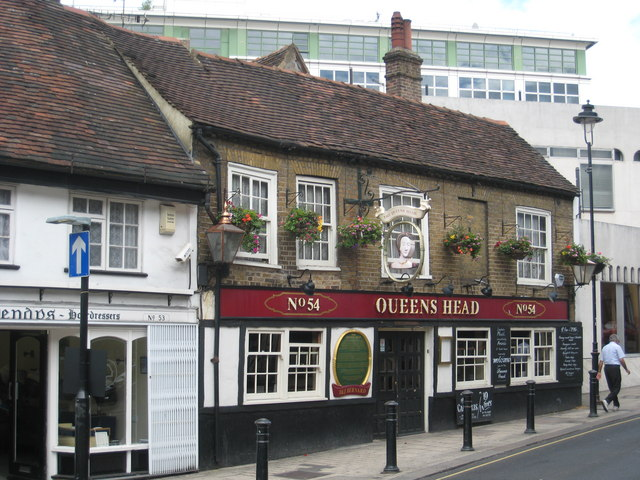
The Queen's Head

The Queen's Head is a public house at 54 Windsor Street, Uxbridge, London.

The Grade II listed building is constructed of brick and dates from the early-mid 19th century.
