= Uxbridge Market House =

Municipal building in Uxbridge, London, England

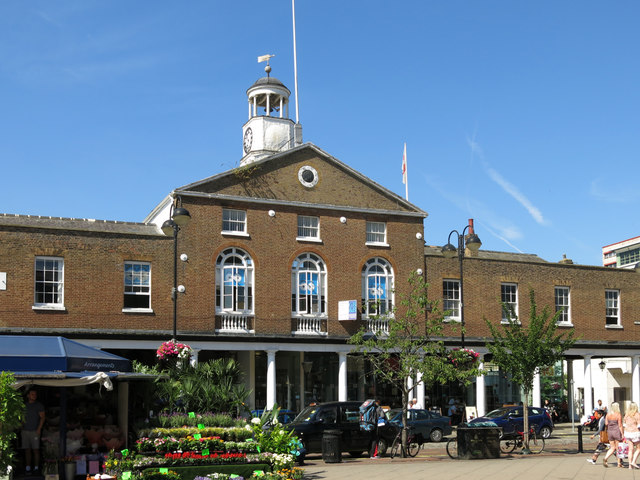
- The building in 2017

- Shown in the London Borough of Hillingdon
- 51.5460°N 0.4794°W
- Location: High Street, Uxbridge

History
- Built: 1788

Site notes
- Architectural style: Neoclassical style

Listed Building – Grade II*
- Official name: The Market House
- Designated: 8 May 1950
- Reference no.: 1080208

The Market House, also known as Uxbridge Town Hall, is a commercial building in the High Street in Uxbridge, a suburb of London, England. The building, which is currently in commercial use, is a Grade II* listed building.

== History ==
The building was commissioned to replace an earlier market house which was completed in 1561, and demolished for the purpose of widening the High Street in 1785.

The new building was designed in the neoclassical style, built in red brick and was completed in 1788. The building was open on the ground floor, so that markets could be held, with an assembly room on the first floor. The design involved a symmetrical main frontage of 11 bays facing onto the high street. The first floor were supported by around 50 Doric order columns. The central section of three bays, which was taller than the other sections, was fenestrated by three tall round headed windows with balustrades on the first floor, and by three square windows at attic level, all surmounted by a pediment with an oculus in the tympanum. The wings of four bays each were fenestrated by sash windows. At roof level, there was a single-stage hexagonal tower with clock faces surmounted by a cupola; the clock was by George Handy of Uxbridge and is dated 1789. Internally, the principal area was the market hall on the ground floor, which was 140 feet (43 m) long and 49 feet (15 m) wide.

In the 19th century, the first floor accommodated a local school, while the ground floor was used as a corn exchange. However, the use of the building as a corn exchange declined significantly in the wake of the Great Depression of British Agriculture in the late 19th century. Following the formation of Uxbridge Urban District Council in 1894, the new council met on the first floor of the market house, which then became known as "Uxbridge Town Hall".

The building continued to serve as the local seat of government until the council acquired a house called Southfields at 265 High Street in 1927 and converted it to be its offices and meeting place. Meanwhile, the market house was converted for commercial use and, in the mid-20th century, the ground floor was enclosed in glass. The glazing was removed later in the century and replaced by a series of retail stalls which were recessed from the curtilage of the building.

== See also ==
- Grade I and II* listed buildings in the London Borough of Hillingdon
