= Three Tuns, Uxbridge =

Pub in Uxbridge, London

Coordinates: 51°32′44″N 0°28′44″W

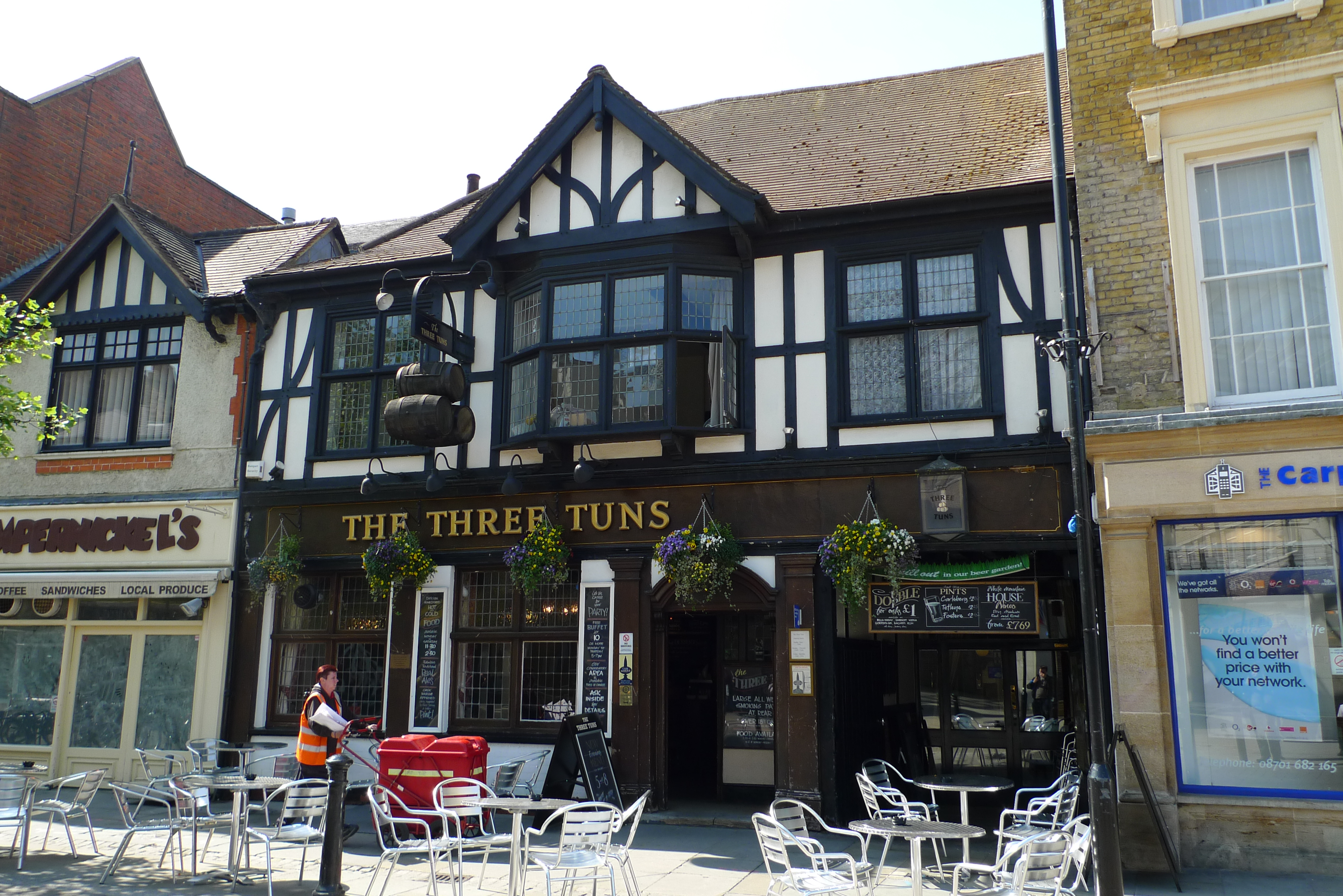
The Three Tuns

The Three Tuns is a Grade II listed public house at 24 High Street, Uxbridge, London.

It was built in the 16th and 17th centuries.
