= Hillingdon Sports and Leisure Complex =

Leisure centre in Uxbridge, England

Coordinates: 51°33′3.63″N 000°28′3.37″W

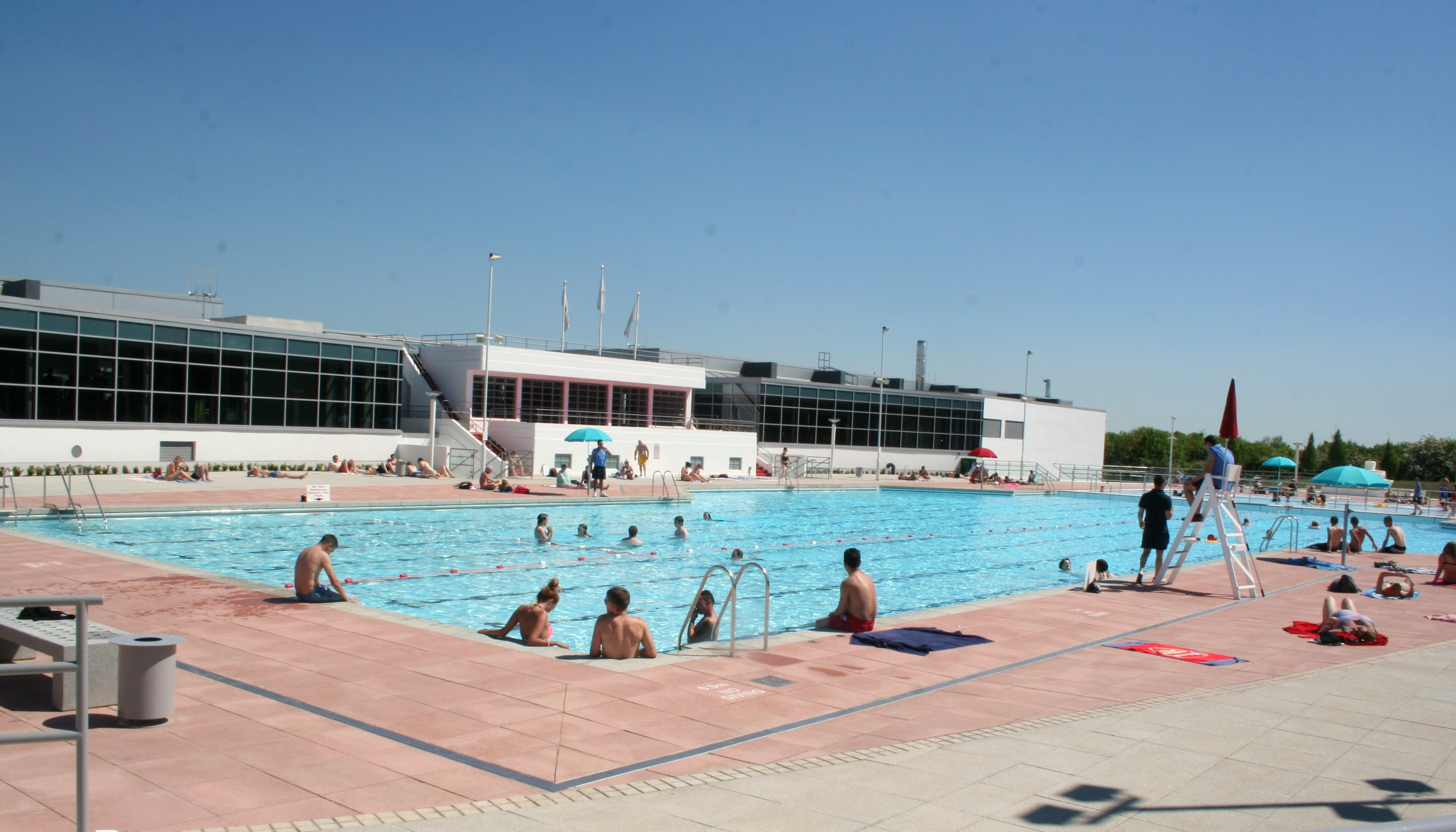
- The refurbished outdoor pool in May 2010
- Interactive map of Hillingdon Sports and Leisure Complex
- Location: Gatting Way, Park Road, Uxbridge, UB8 1NR
- Owner: London Borough of Hillingdon
- Operator: Fusion Lifestyle
- Dimensions: Length: 220 feet (67 m); Width: 72.5 feet (22.1 m)

Construction
- Opened: 1935
- Closed: 1998^{*} Reopened 2010
- Architect: G.P. Trentham

Website
- fusion-lifestyle.com/centres/Hillingdon_Sport_and_Leisure_Complex

Listed Building – Grade II
- Official name: Uxbridge Lido
- Designated: 24 April 1998
- Reference no.: 1323711

Listed Building – Grade II
- Official name: Entrance Building, Uxbridge Lido
- Designated: 24 April 1998
- Reference no.: 1323712

Listed Building – Grade II
- Official name: North Fountain, Uxbridge Lido
- Designated: 24 April 1998
- Reference no.: 1323713

Listed Building – Grade II
- Official name: South Fountain, Uxbridge Lido
- Designated: 24 April 1998
- Reference no.: 1323714

Listed Building – Grade II
- Official name: Grandstand, Uxbridge Lido
- Designated: 24 April 1998
- Reference no.: 1323715

The Hillingdon Sports and Leisure Complex is a leisure centre in Uxbridge, operated by Better (GLL) on behalf of the London Borough of Hillingdon. The complex is centred on the Grade II listed outdoor swimming pool, known as Uxbridge Lido until 2010, when the newly built centre and refurbished pool were opened. A new indoor pool was built beside the lido as part of the redevelopment works, opening in February 2010, followed a day later by the outdoor pool.

The outdoor pool was built in 1935 in the "Moderne" or Art Deco style, at a cost of £24,500. It was closed in 1998 and became subject to heavy vandalism. In 2007 it was announced that the pool would be restored in time to be used as a training pool for the 2012 Summer Olympics.

== Description ==
The oldest parts of the complex are the unheated outdoor swimming pool, two fountains, an entrance building and a grandstand structure, all of which are Grade II listed.

At opening the pool measured 220 by 72.5 feet (67.1 m × 22.1 m), and took the form of an elongated twelve-sided star in plan – it is the only remaining example in the country. It was the second longest open-air swimming pool remaining in London. The two fountains are arranged in a line, one to the north and one to the south of the pool. These are octagonal concrete structures, each with a base and central column supporting two basins.

The concrete and brick entrance building at the northern end of the complex has a single storey and has a splayed "U"-shape in plan. The short central brick bay features a pay window. The grandstand on the eastern side of the lido is built of reinforced concrete and has three levels including the open flat roofed viewing terrace.

As part of the new development, the Hillingdon House Farm athletics track nearby was refurbished to become part of the new complex. The building beside the outdoor pool comprises a new 50-metre (160 ft) pool, sports hall, health and fitness facilities, café and changing rooms.

== History ==
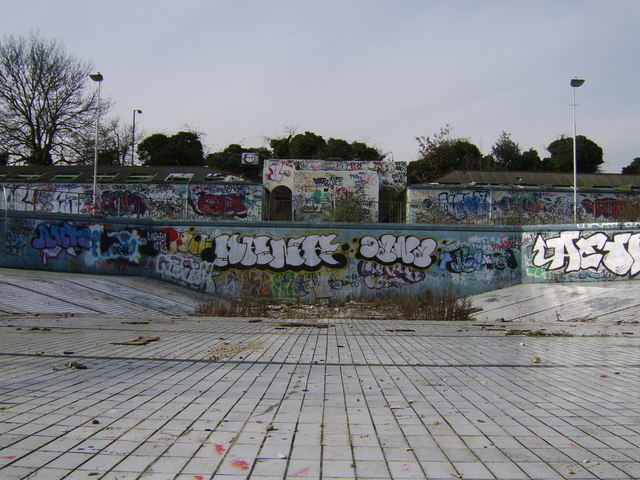
The heavily vandalised outdoor pool, photographed in 2007

The architect for the lido was G. Percy Trentham. Before the opening of the pool, many residents swam in a section of the Frays River near Harefield Road, and the Colne. The construction of the buildings and pool cost £24,500 at that time, and 120 local unemployed men were employed to complete the works.

The opening ceremony for the pool was held on 31 August 1935, organised by Uxbridge Urban District Council. The chairman of the council, Reverend Luther Bouch, performed the opening, while Alf Price became the first superintendent.

Athletes participating in the 1948 Summer Olympics in London were housed at the nearby RAF Uxbridge, and used the pool to train in.

Hillingdon Council closed the pool after the 1982 season and did not open it in 1983. It was then reopened by Uxbridge Pool Action Group in 1984, following a £148,000 grant from the Greater London Council. They installed solar heating panels and a huge water slide, as well as additional dry-side activities to try to improve the viability of the pool. However, it did not prove to be a viable proposition in the long-term and the Council eventually took the pool back in 1989.

Lidos historian Andy Hoines wrote: "Subsequently the pool closed down a second time, but was reopened again by the Yiewsley Pool Trust by the time of a visit I made in 1993. The current closure after the 1998 season was prompted by damage attributed to incursions from travellers, as well as the perceived need for major expenditure to bring the facilities up to recent Health and Safety standards."

The pool, pavilion building, entrance building and both fountains were granted Grade II listed status in 1998. Despite the listing and the pool closing to the public, the buildings were subjected to heavy vandalism.

=== Restoration ===
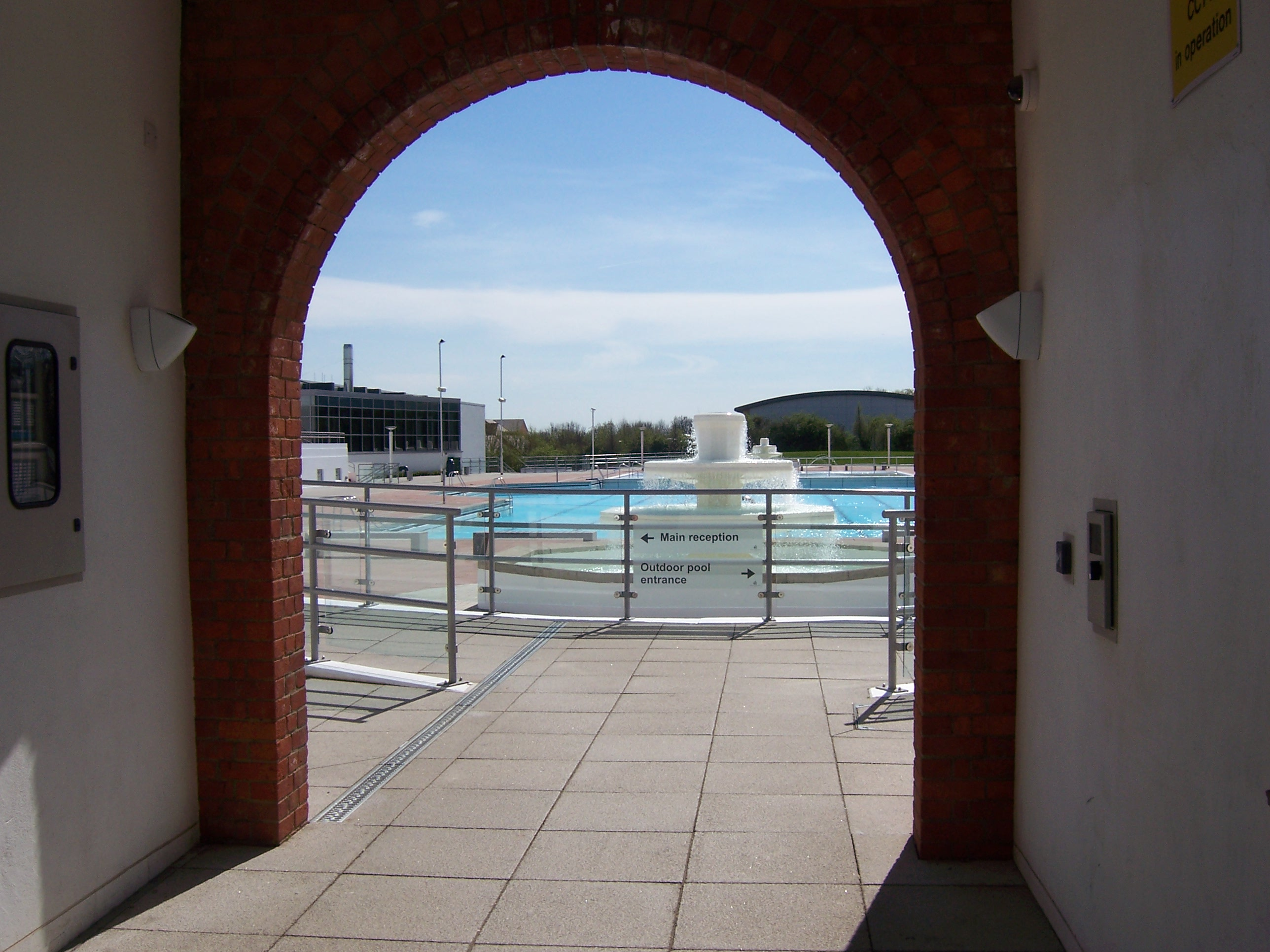
Entrance to the refurbished outdoor pool in 2011

In October 2000 the London Borough of Hillingdon proposed building a 50-metre (160 ft) indoor community pool with movable booms and floors beside the outdoor pool, with a centre for performance training. Under the plans, the outdoor pool would be restored to allow for outdoor swimming, and the new development would include a health and fitness suite, restaurant, health suite and sports hall. English Heritage would oversee the project to restore the lido.

Planning permission for the main swimming pool and sports centre was granted on 8 June 2005. In January 2008, the contractors Leadbitter, with a design team headed by FaulknerBrowns Architects, began work on the £21m swimming pool complex that would be used by budding Olympians in the run up to the 2012 games. Sharron Davies, the former Olympic swimmer, commenced the building work in a special ceremony. The outdoor pool will be completely restored to its former glory.

The athletic track was completed in April 2006, and was officially opened by Queen Elizabeth II.

Funding was provided by London Borough of Hillingdon (£22m), London Development Agency (£2.02m), Sport England (£1.5m) and the Heritage Lottery Fund (just under £1m). In May 2009 a topping out ceremony was held, attended by councillors, the construction firm and members of the local residents' association.

The indoor pool and sports complex opened to local residents in February 2010, and was officially opened by the Mayor of London, Boris Johnson, on 21 March 2010. The unheated outdoor pool re-opened the following day.

On 8 September 2010, the 75th anniversary of the first opening of the lido was celebrated at the pool.

The South Korean Olympic Team used the centre for training during the 2012 Olympic Games.
