= The Case is Altered, Eastcote =

Pub in Eastcote, London

Coordinates: 51°35′20″N 0°24′13″W

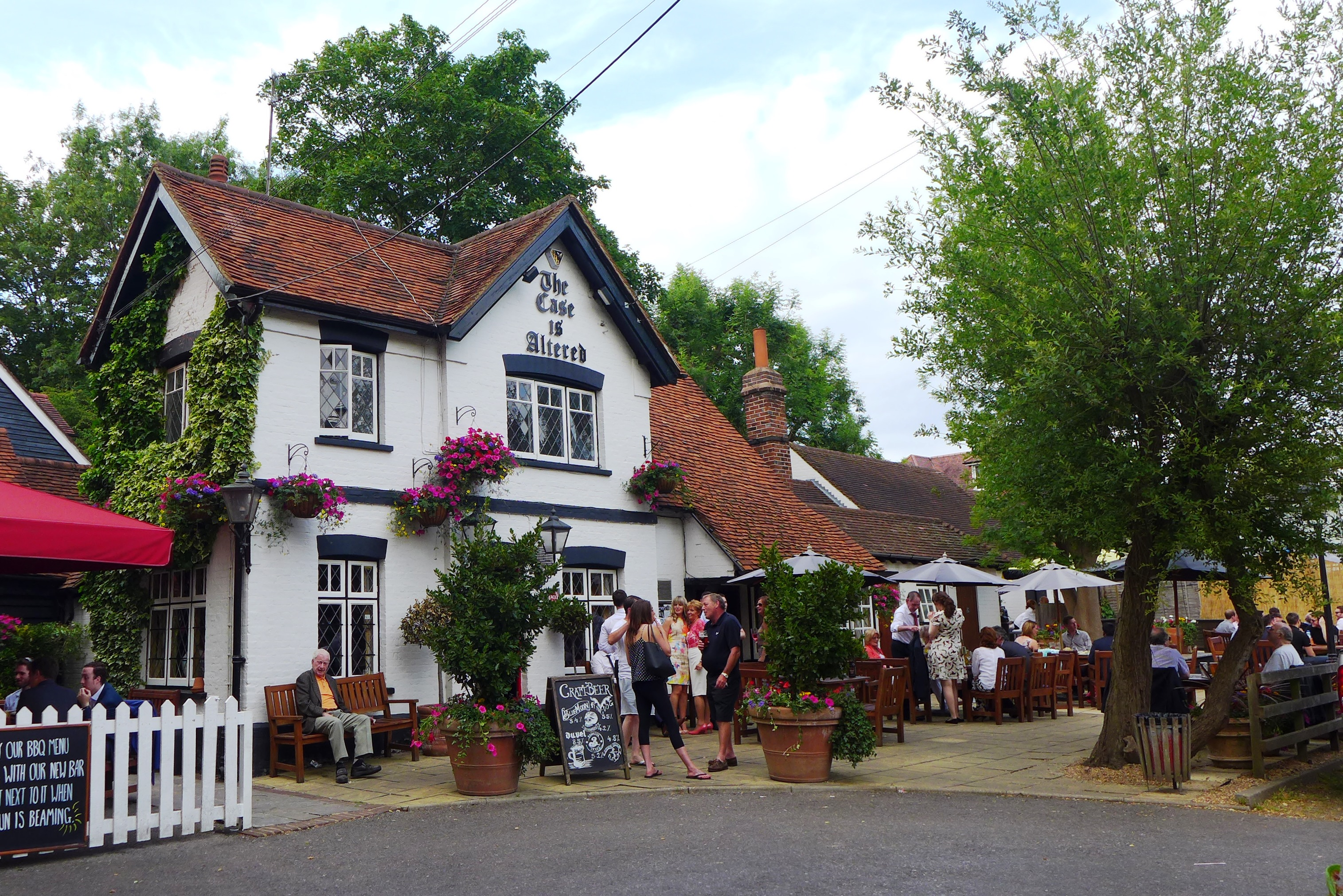
The Case is Altered

The Case is Altered is a Grade II listed public house at Southill Lane, Eastcote, northwest London.

It dates from the 16th century.

It is one of several pubs in the United Kingdom with this name.
