= The Crown, Cowley =

Pub in Cowley, London

Coordinates: 51°31′51″N 0°28′56″W

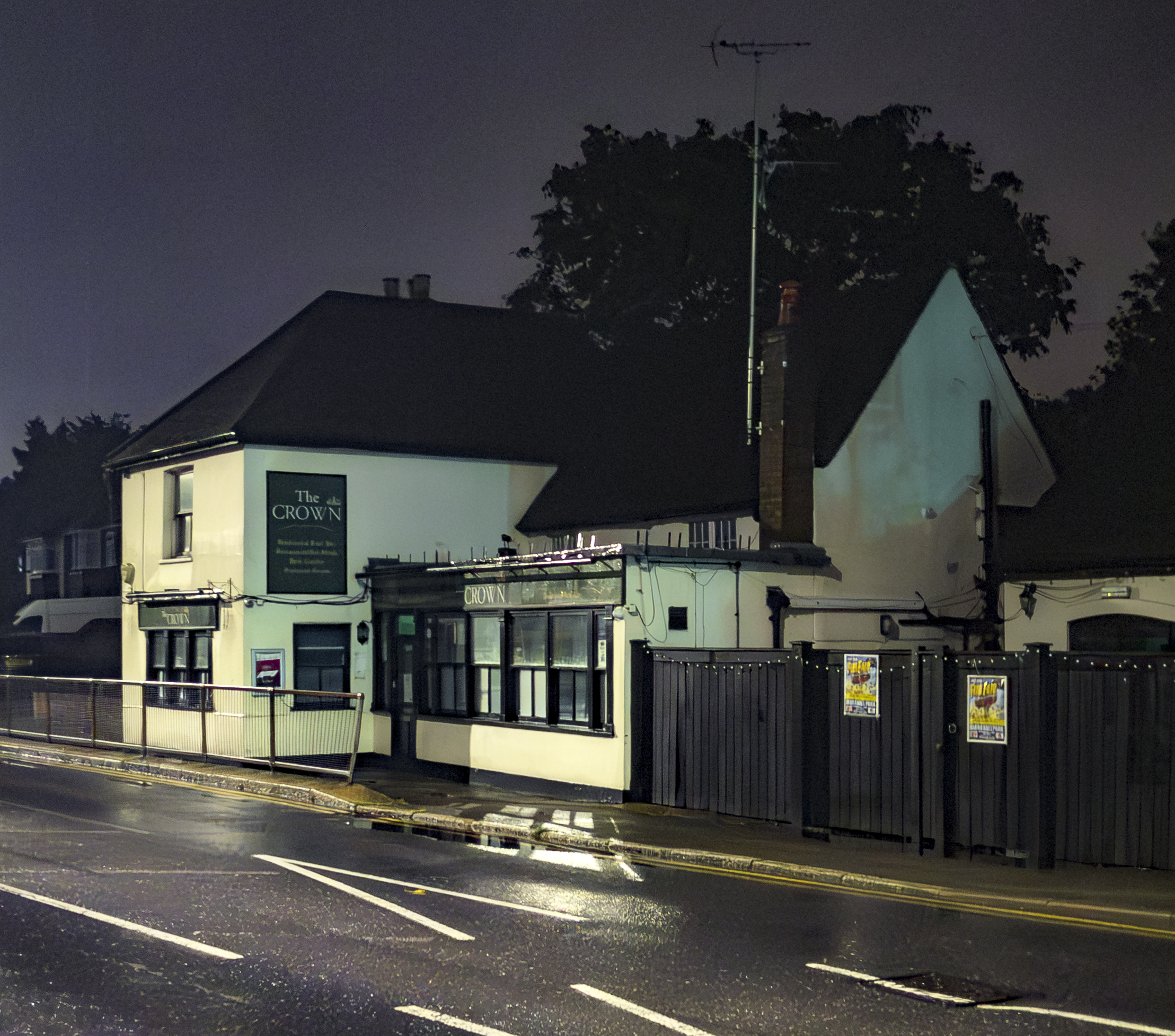
The Crown in 2024

The Crown is a Grade II listed public house at High Street, Cowley, London.

It dates from the 16th century.
