= Randalls of Uxbridge =

Former department store in Uxbridge, London

Coordinates: 51.544628°N 0.477739°W

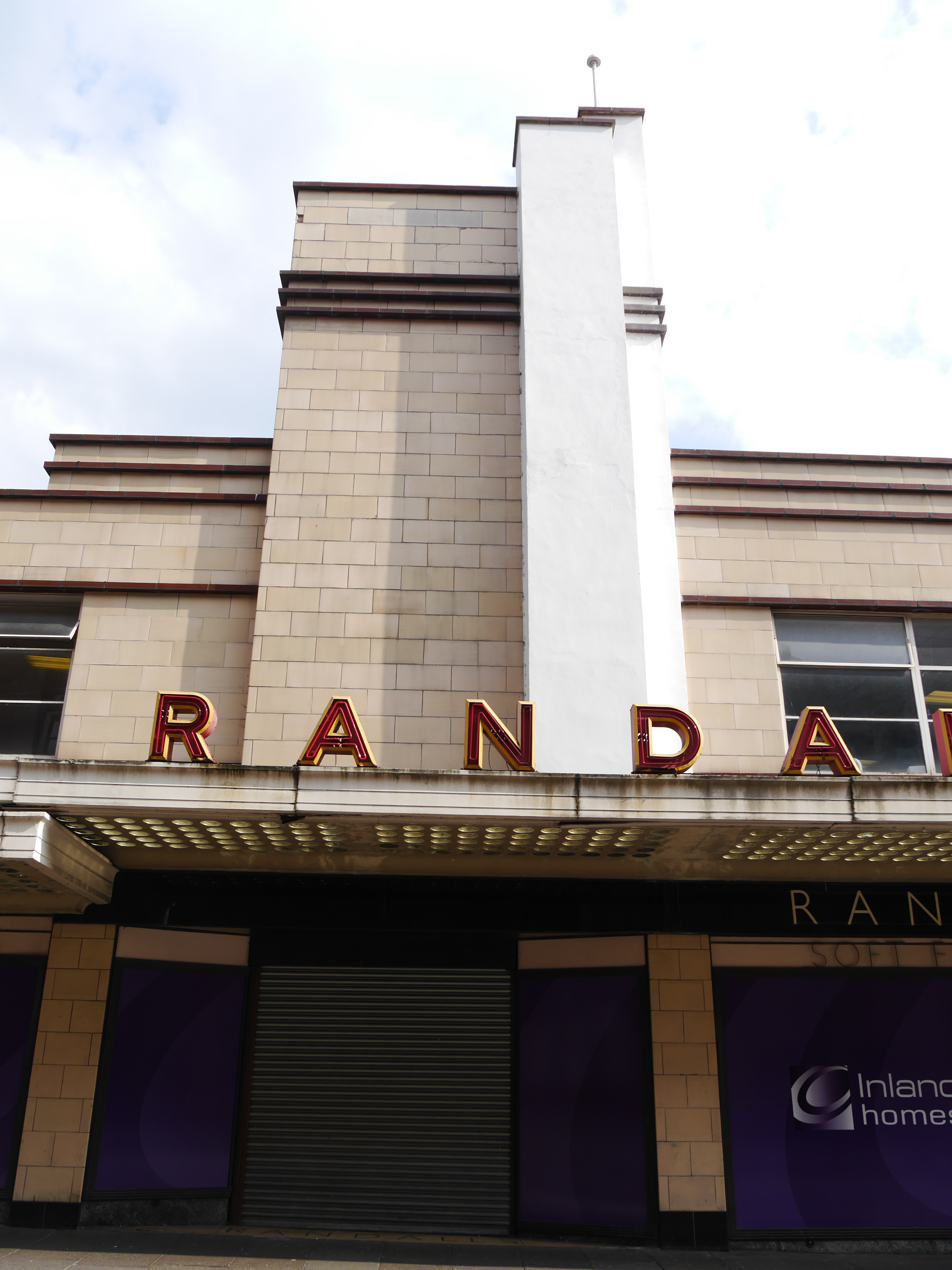
Randalls of Uxbridge, 2016

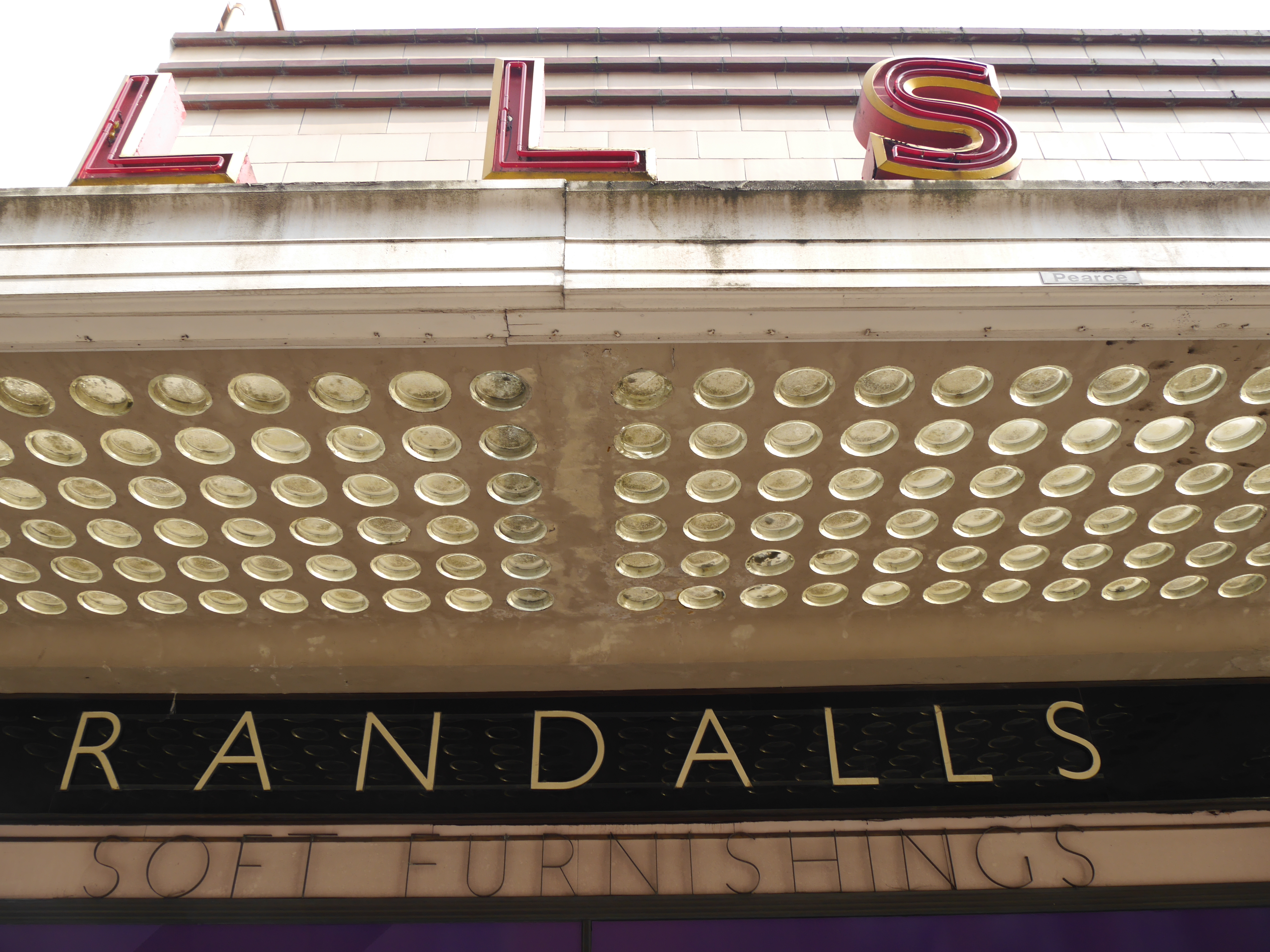
Randalls of Uxbridge, 2016

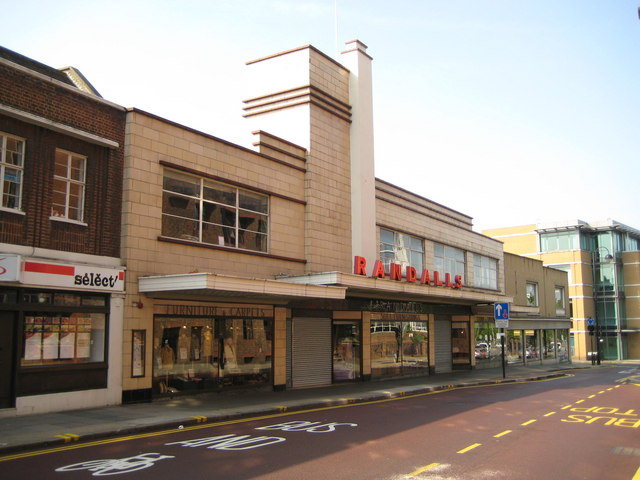
Randalls of Uxbridge, 2008

Randalls of Uxbridge was a family-owned British department store in Vine Street, Uxbridge, which operated for 123 years until it closed in January 2015. The store mainly sold homeware and furniture, but also sold designer menswear.

== History ==
Randalls originated in 1891, and the current store was built in 1937–38 and designed by William Eves (1867–1950). The store was designed in the 1930s style with cream faience. During the Second World War, the store was accused of adverts which made light of censorship rules at the time. It was used as a location for the British sitcom Only Fools and Horses. In 2008, the building became a Grade II listed building.

In January 2015, the store closed down. At the time of closure, only five letters in the store name were illuminated properly on the shop front. The final owner of the store was MP John Randall, the fifth generation of his family to own the store. Randall blamed the closure of the shop on a variety of things, including the rise of online shopping, as well as zero-hour contracts.

In October 2015, the building was acquired by Inland Homes, who redeveloped the building, using it as a mixed-use development since 2021.
