= Regal Cinema, Uxbridge =

Former cinema in Uxbridge, Hillingdon, London, now a nightclub

Coordinates: 51.544556°N 0.474324°W

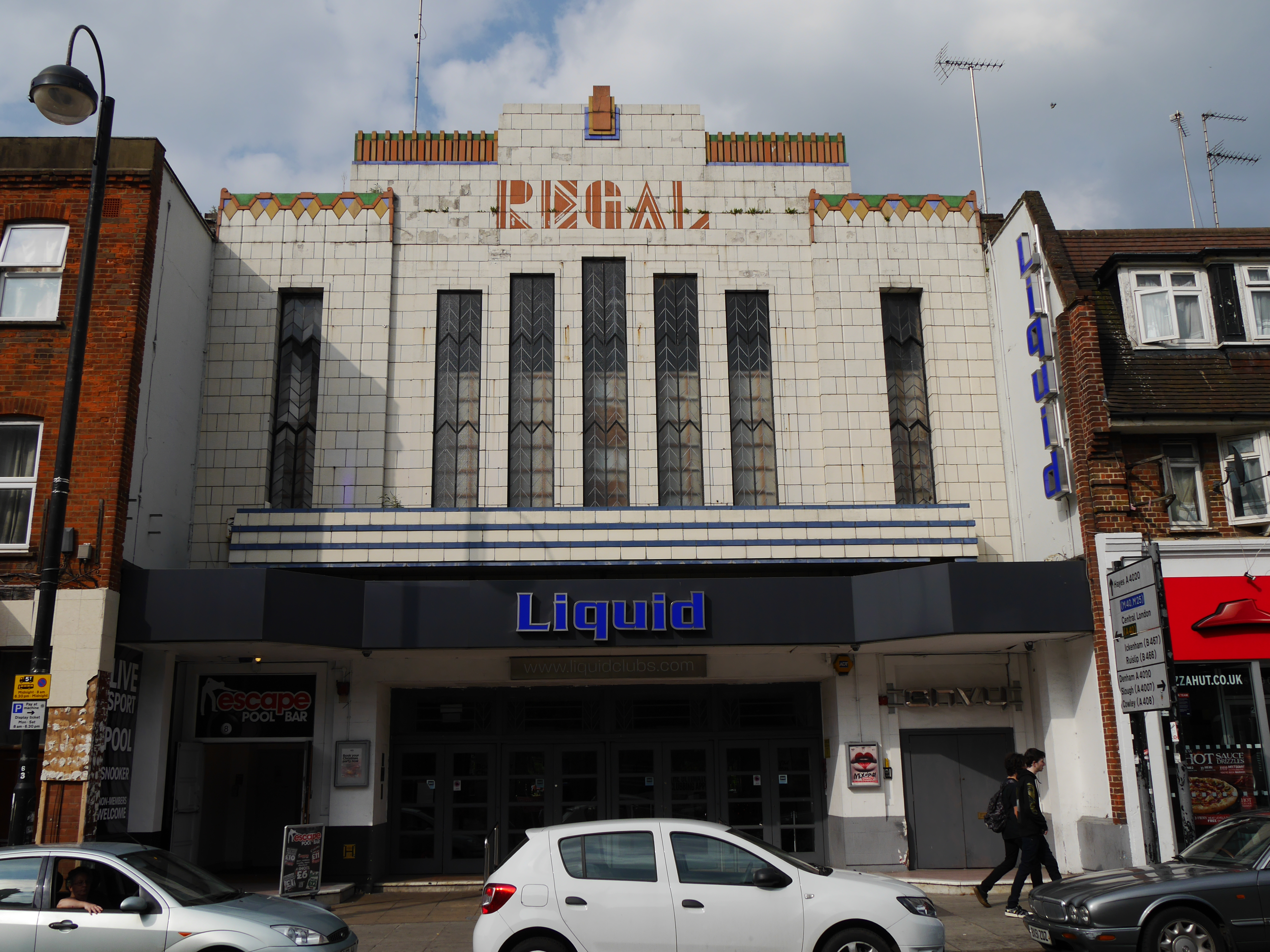
The former Regal Cinema, 2016

The Regal Cinema is a former cinema building in an Egyptian Revival architectural style in High Street, Uxbridge, in the London Borough of Hillingdon. It became the ABC Regal, then Discothèque Royale, and was a branch of the Liquid nightclub chain.

It is a Grade II* listed building, built in 1930–31 for Uxbridge Entertainments Ltd (a company controlled by the cinema speculator A. E. Abrahams), and the architect was E. Norman Bailey.

The author David Atwell calls it, "one of the most highly developed exercises in Art Deco attempted in any cinema", and Historic England call it, "the finest surviving work of the cinema architect E Norman Bailey".

The cinema was listed in 1977 following a hard-fought campaign by local environmentalists who objected to proposals by Hillingdon Council to demolish it and surrounding buildings to build offices, flats and warehousing.
