= Black Horse, Eastcote =

Pub in Eastcote, London

Coordinates: 51°35′04″N 0°24′24″W

The Black Horse is a Grade II listed public house at High Road, Eastcote, in the London Borough of Hillingdon. It was built in the early 19th century.
