= Longford Meeting House =

Grade II listed building in Longford, UK

Coordinates: 51°28′53″N 0°29′06″W

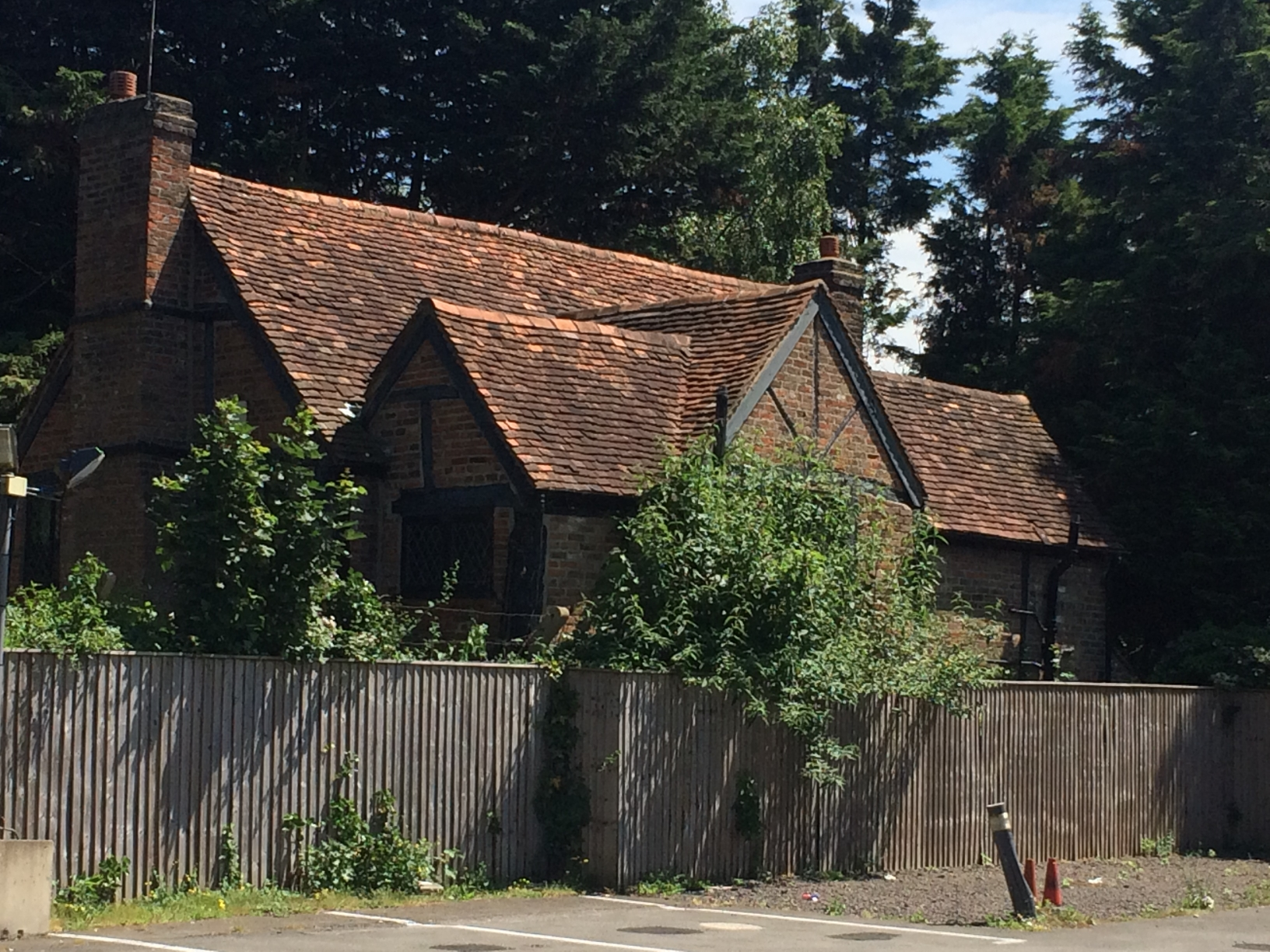
Former Longford Meeting House

Longford Meeting House is a Grade II listed building, formerly used by the Society of Friends for worship, that stands on a site at the south side of Bath Road, Longford, a short distance to the east of the Duke of Northumberland's River.

== Building ==
A detailed description of this building, identified by Historic England as “Longford Cottage, Bath Road, Longford, Hayes”, is included in the relevant entry on its website. The description there appears to be based on an external inspection of the structure and was composed in 1974 when the property was first listed. It states the building is a timber-framed cottage of 16th-century appearance with a tiled roof and nogging of old narrow bricks. There is a gabled extension to the west of the original structure.

== History ==
Meetings of the Society of Friends had started at Longford by 1669, initially in a private house. In 1672, land was bought by the Longford Monthly Meeting for a burying place. A purpose-built meeting house was erected on part of the land and opened for use in 1676. Meetings continued to be held there until 1794. The Quakers sold the building in 1875, after which it was converted into a cottage. The same source states that the building had been demolished by the date of publication. However, an apparently 19th-century photograph held by the Library of the Religious Society of Friends shows a building with the same shape and pattern of external timbers as the picture that illustrated the auction catalogue when the property was offered for sale in 2012. The catalogue states that the building was “historically used as a Quaker Meeting House” and gives its postal address as Longford Cottage, 493 Bath Road, Longford, West Drayton, Middlesex, UB7 0EN.

== Effect of Proposed Heathrow Runway 3 ==
On 1 July 2015, the Airports Commission recommended that the Government approve Heathrow Airport having a third runway in the form of the Northwest Runway scheme put forward by Heathrow Airport Ltd. The plan on page 99 of the Airports Commission report confirms that the proposal requires the demolition of the former Longford Meeting House. The stages involved in bringing forward the proposed development are set out on the Heathrow Expansion website.
