= The Shovel, Cowley =

Pub in Cowley, London

Coordinates: 51°31′47″N 0°29′08″W

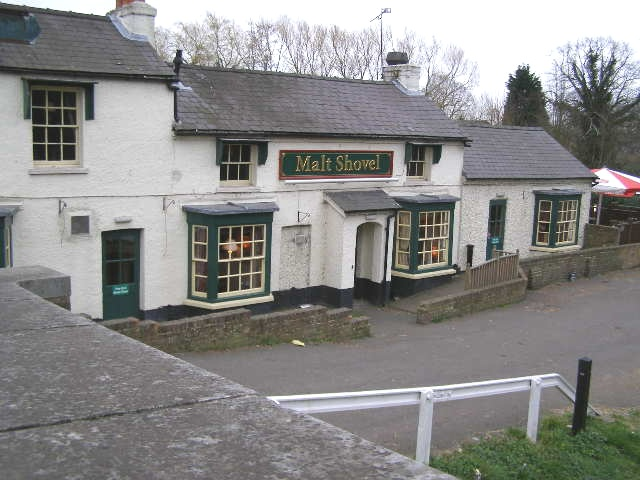
The Malt Shovel

The Malt Shovel is a Grade II listed public house at Iver Lane, Cowley, London.

It was built early 19th century. It is now called The Malt Shovel.

The Shovel appeared in the 1956 biopic Reach for the Sky about the RAF airman, Douglas Bader with the location being portrayed as rural France during World War II.
