= Red Lion, Hillingdon =

Pub in Hillingdon, London

Coordinates: 51°32′06″N 0°27′40″W

The Red Lion in 2023

The Red Lion is a Grade II listed public house at Royal Lane, Hillingdon, London.

According to English Heritage, it was probably built in the 16th century, and the timber-framed building was refronted in about 1800.

The Red Lion has grown over the years and now the former Conifir Cafe is joined to the public house forming the Red Lion restaurant. The former Cottage Hotel is now the historic wing of the 55 bedroom hotel, a 45 bedroom block was added to the rear of the property in 2003.

Many original features remain in the various buildings including original staircases, vaulted cellar, Tudor fireplaces and original beams.

The public house was bought by Fuller, Smith and Turner in 1905.
