= Uxbridge =

Town in the west of Greater London, England

Coordinates: 51.5404°N 0.4778°W

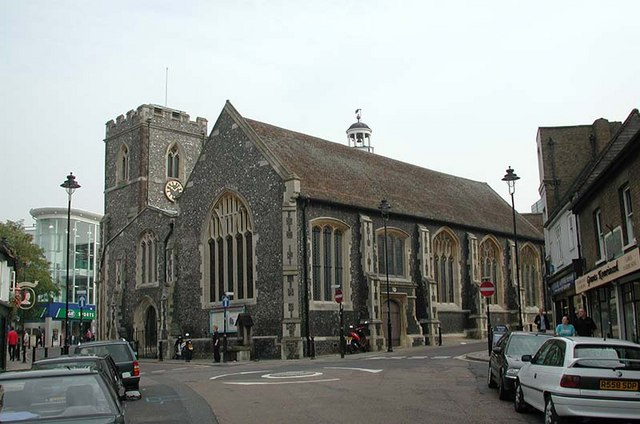
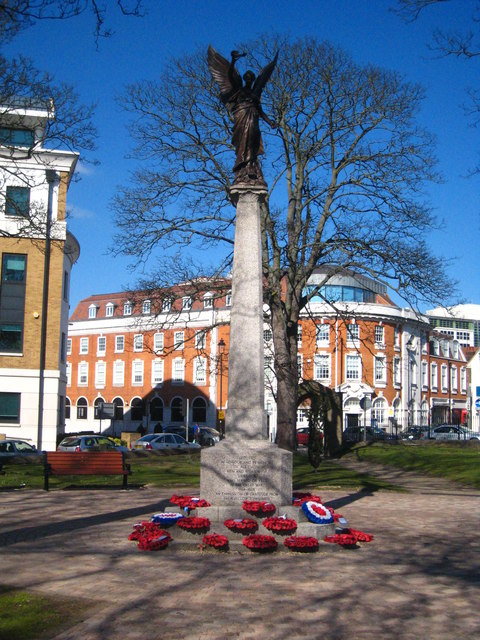
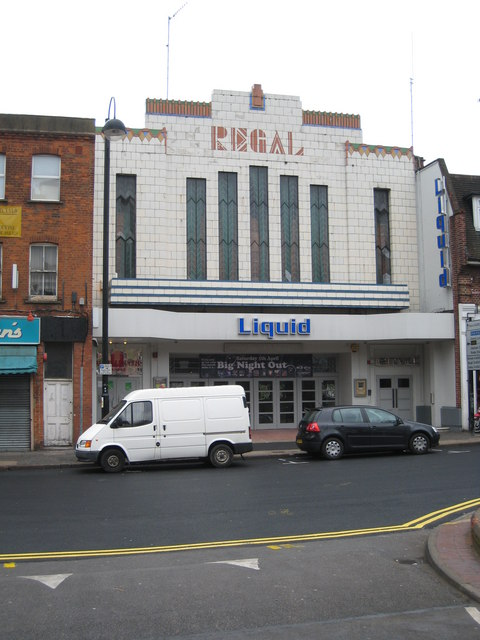
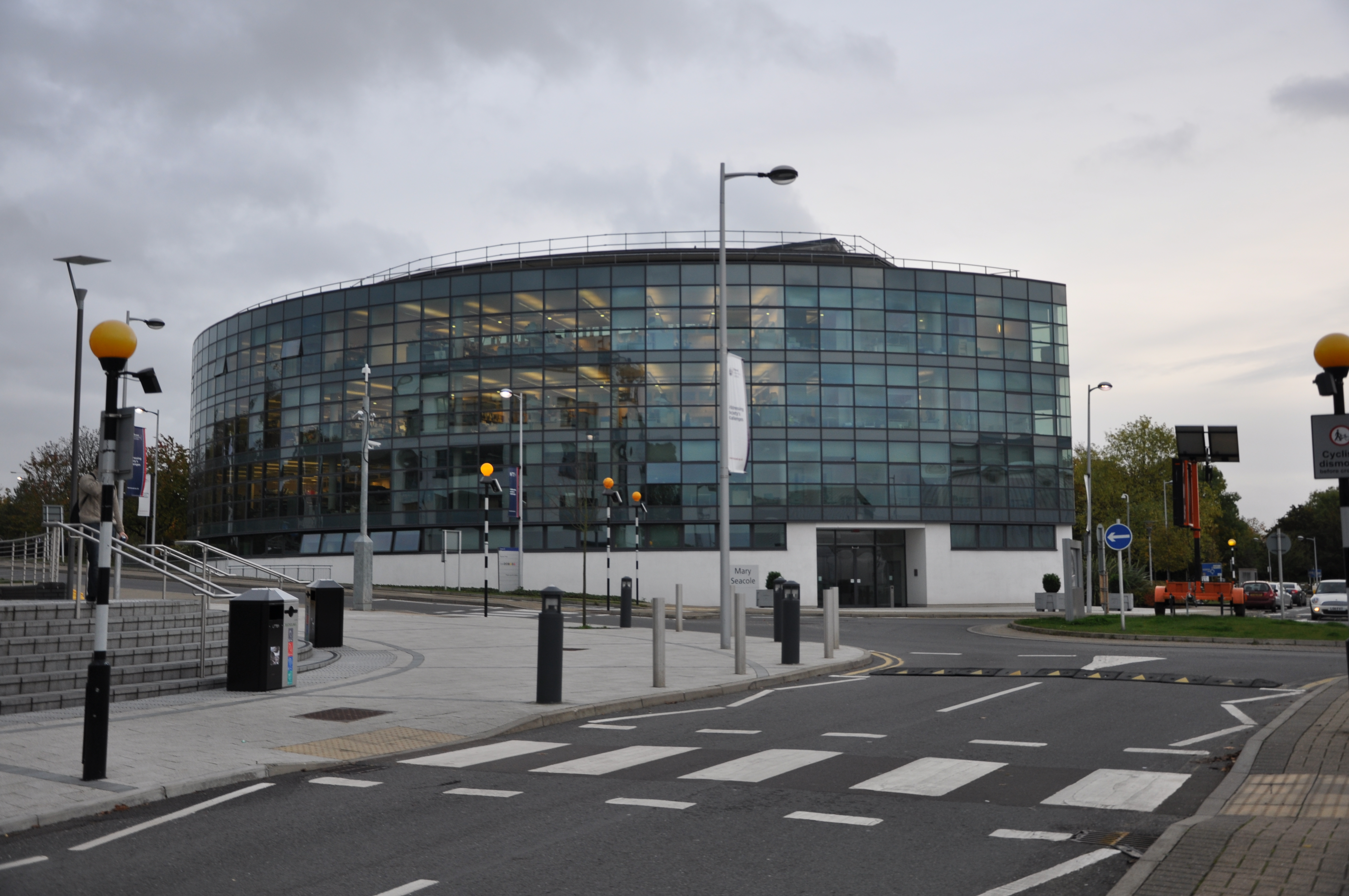
- Clockwise from top: St Margaret's Church; The listed Regal Cinema building; Brunel University; Uxbridge War Memorial

- Location within Greater London
- Population: 70,560 (2011 census (Note: Uxbridge is taken at is broadest definition, a conurbation definition, as 6 wards in the London Borough of Hillingdon: Brunel, Harefield, Hillingdon East, Ickenham, Uxbridge North, and Uxbridge South.))
- OS grid reference: TQ055835
  - Charing Cross: 15 mi (24 km) ESE
- London borough: Hillingdon
- Ceremonial county: Greater London
- Region: London
- Country: England
- Sovereign state: United Kingdom
- Post town: UXBRIDGE
- Postcode district: UB8
- Dialling code: 01895
- Police: Metropolitan
- Fire: London
- Ambulance: London
- UK Parliament: Uxbridge and South Ruislip
- London Assembly: Ealing and Hillingdon

Uxbridge (/ˈʌksbrɪdʒ/) is a suburban town in west London, England, and the administrative headquarters of the London Borough of Hillingdon, 15.4 miles (24.8 km) northwest of Charing Cross. Uxbridge formed part of the parish of Hillingdon in the county of Middlesex. As part of the suburban growth of London in the 20th century it expanded and increased in population, becoming a municipal borough in 1955, and part of Greater London in 1965.

Attempted negotiations between King Charles I and the Parliamentary Army during the English Civil War took place at a public house called the Crown and Treaty. RAF Uxbridge houses the Battle of Britain Bunker, from where the air defence of the south-east of England was coordinated during the Battle of Britain especially from its No. 11 Group Operations Room, also used during the D-Day landings.

Today the town serves as a significant retail and commercial centre; it also houses Brunel University London as well as a campus of Buckinghamshire New University. A part of the town which has large converted flour mills adjoins Buckinghamshire, the boundary being the River Colne.

== History ==
=== Toponymy ===
The name of the town is derived from "Wixan's Bridge", which was sited near the bottom of Oxford Road where a modern road bridge stands, beside the Swan and Bottle public house. The Wixan were a 7th-century Saxon tribe from Lincolnshire who also began to settle in what became Middlesex. Anglo-Saxons began to settle and farm in the area of Uxbridge in the 5th century, clearing dense woodland. Two other places in Middlesex bore the name of the Wixan: Uxendon ("Wixan's Hill"), a name preserved only in the street names of Uxendon Hill and Crescent in Harrow, and Waxlow ("Wixan's Wood") near Southall.

Archaeologists found Bronze Age remains (before 700 BC) and medieval remains during the construction of The Chimes shopping centre; two miles (3.2 km) away at Denham, Upper Paleolithic remains have been found. Uxbridge is not mentioned in the Domesday Book of the 11th century, but a hundred years later St Margaret's Church, was built. The town appears in records from 1107 as "Woxbrigge", and became part of the Elthorne Hundred with other settlements in the area.

=== Early developments ===
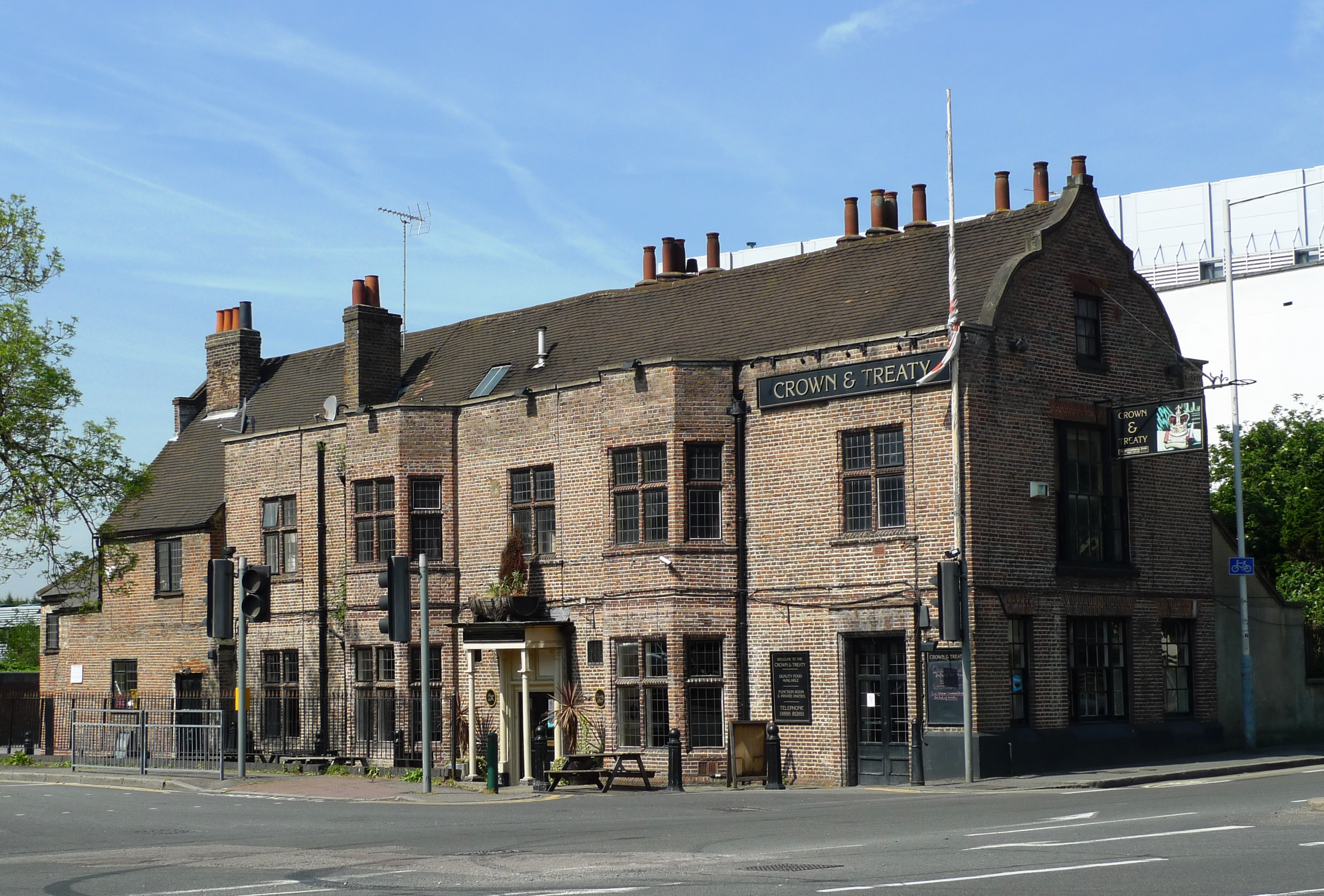
The Crown & Treaty public house

The Parliamentary Army garrisoned the town upon the outbreak of the English Civil War in 1642 and established their headquarters there in June 1647 on a line from Staines to Watford, although the king passed through Uxbridge in April 1646, resting at the Red Lion public house for several hours. Charles I met with representatives of Parliament at the Crown Inn in Uxbridge in 1645, but negotiations for the end of hostilities were unsuccessful due in part to the king's stubborn attitude. The town had been chosen as it was located between the Royal headquarters at Oxford and the Parliamentary stronghold of London.

The covered market was built in 1788, replacing a building constructed in 1561. In the early 19th century, Uxbridge had an unsavoury reputation; the jurist William Arabin said of its residents "They will steal the very teeth out of your mouth as you walk through the streets. I know it from experience." For about 200 years most of London's flour was produced in the Uxbridge area.

The Grand Junction Canal opened in 1794, linking Uxbridge with Birmingham and the River Thames at Brentford. By 1800 Uxbridge had become one of the most important market towns in Middlesex, helped by its status as the first stopping point for stagecoaches travelling from London to Oxford. The development of Uxbridge declined after the opening of the Great Western Railway in 1838, which passed through West Drayton. A branch line to Uxbridge was opened in 1856, but it was the opening of the Metropolitan Line in 1904 which restarted Uxbridge's growth by giving the town its first direct link to London.

Harman's Brewery was established in Uxbridge by George Harman in 1763, and moved into a new headquarters in Uxbridge High Street in 1875. The eventual owners of the brewery, Courage, closed the headquarters in 1964. It was demolished and replaced by a Budgen's supermarket, which in turn was demolished with the construction of The Chimes shopping centre. The brewery building in George Street remained in place until it was demolished in 1967. The office building Harman House was built on the site in 1985, named after the brewery.

=== Urban development ===
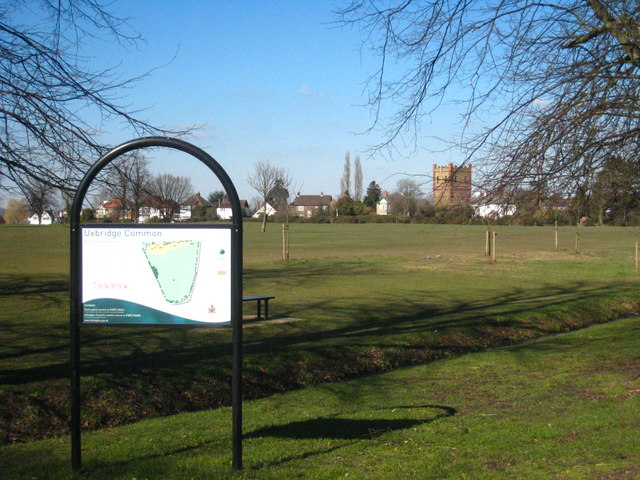
Uxbridge Common was reduced in size by the 1819 inclosures within Hillingdon Parish.

The main enclosures effected in the parish of Hillingdon, by statute in 1819, saw the reduction of Uxbridge Common, which at its largest had been 4 miles (6.4 km) in circumference. It originally straddled Park Road, north of the town centre, and covers 15 acres (6.1 ha).

In 1871 the town's first purpose-built police station was built in Windsor Street. The building included three cells and stables. The Metropolitan Police continued to use the building until 1988, when operations moved to a new site in Harefield Road. The building subsequently became the Old Bill public house in 1996, renamed the Fig Tree in 2006.

In the early 1900s the Uxbridge and District Electricity Supply Company had been established a power station in Waterloo Road, and much of the town was connected by 1902, although some houses still had gas lighting in 1912. A water tower on Uxbridge Common was built in 1906, resembling a church tower, to improve the supply to the town.

Wood panelling from a room in the Crown & Treaty public house was sold in 1924 to an American businessman, who installed it in his office in the Empire State Building in New York. It was returned in 1953 as a gift to the newly crowned Queen Elizabeth II and returned to the house, although the monarch retained ownership.

On 31 August 1935 Uxbridge Lido, an outdoor swimming pool built in the "Moderne" or Art Deco style, was officially opened. Before the opening, many residents swam in a section of the Frays River near Harefield Road, and the Colne. The pool, pavilion building, entrance building and both fountains were designated Grade II listed buildings in 1998. Despite the listing, the pool was closed to the public and the buildings became subject to heavy vandalism. The Uxbridge open-air pool was fully refurbished during 2009 and re-opened in May 2010. Added to the site, renamed Hillingdon Sports and Leisure Complex, was a 50 m indoor competition pool, a leisure pool, a 100-station gym, a wide range of exercise classes, an athletics stadium and track, 3G floodlit pitches, a sports hall, a café and a crèche. The Grade II listed buildings are still standing.

During the Second World War Uxbridge adopted the Royal Navy destroyer HMS Intrepid in 1942, to help towards the ship's costs; Intrepid was lost to enemy action the following year. The town and surrounding areas suffered bombing by the Luftwaffe. V1 flying bombs fell on the town between June 1944 and March 1945. The first recorded bombing using a V1 was on 22 June 1944 at 07:00, when the bomb passed over the top of a bus and hit four houses nearby. Seven people were killed and 25 injured, leaving 46 houses in the area uninhabitable. In all the Uxbridge Urban District suffered 79 civilian deaths through enemy action in the war.

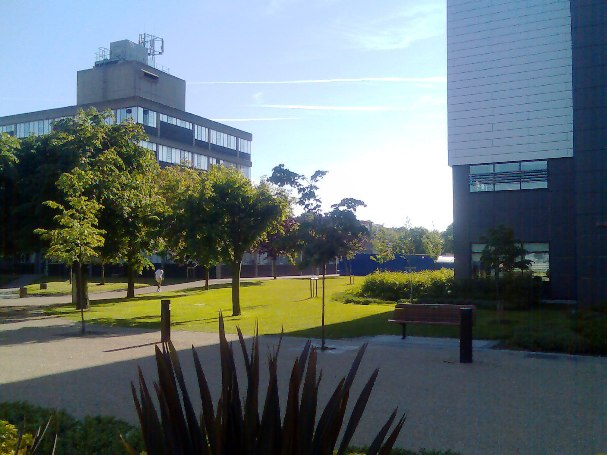
Brunel University was built on land formerly occupied by the Lowe & Shawyer plant nursery.

In 1958 the 199-acre (81 ha) Lowe & Shawyer plant nursery to the west of RAF Uxbridge entered voluntary liquidation. The nursery had stood in Kingston Lane since 1868, and was the largest producer of cut flowers in the country. Demolition work began in 1962, and the construction of Brunel University commenced. Chrysanthemums are included the coat of arms of the Borough of Uxbridge in memory of the nursery. The Uxbridge (Vine Street) railway branch line, which partly ran alongside the site, was closed in 1964 and in 1966 the university opened, purchasing the land where the railway had run from the local council for £65,000.

The Uxbridge Cricket Club moved from Cricketfield Road in 1971 to make way for the new Civic Centre. The club had been at Cricketfield Road since 1858, but moved to a new site on part of Uxbridge Common on Park Road. The Market Square shopping precinct in the town centre was built in the late 1970s, but its lack of shelter made it unpopular and it did not attract the expected levels of custom. Many buildings along the High Street and Windsor Street had been demolished to make way for the new precinct, which was eventually sold to the Prudential Assurance Company and redeveloped with a roof in the early 1980s to become the Pavilions Shopping Centre. The Peacock public house (later renamed The Chequers) in one of the two main squares was built partially underground having two flights of steps down into the pub at either end. It was demolished and replaced with a café named also named The Chequers, which remains. Rayner's pharmacy shop was also demolished during the Market Square development, although the shopfront was saved by the Museum of London and is held in storage.

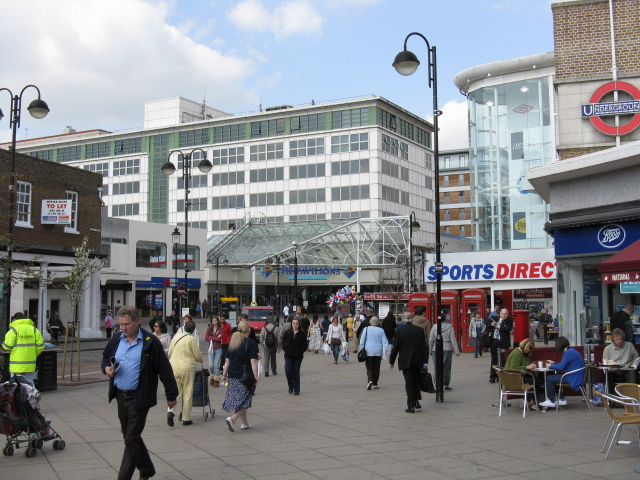
Uxbridge High Street and The Pavilions shopping centre

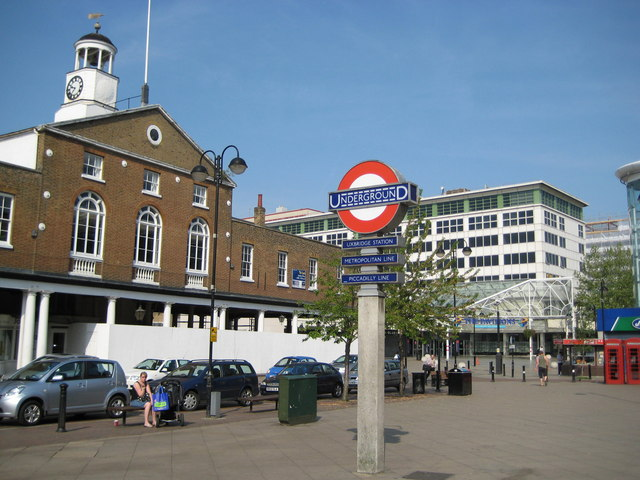
Uxbridge Market House on the High Street

The Chimes shopping centre was built beside Uxbridge station in 2001, incorporating many of the existing buildings into the new structure. The centre was originally to be named St George's Centre in plans dating back to the early 1990s, though this name was eventually taken by another shopping centre in Harrow. Instead, The Chimes was said to refer to the sound of the bells from the nearby market house on the High Street. An Odeon cinema opened as a major part of the centre, with the smaller cinema at the opposite end of the High Street closing. Some houses on Chippendale Way and the St George's car park were demolished to allow for the construction of the new shopping centre car park. The offices of the local building company Fassnidge were also included in the new development; built in the 19th century, they house a Pizza Express restaurant. Preserved timber from earlier demolished buildings in Uxbridge was used in the construction of a new building beside the former offices of Fassnidge, designed to resemble a much older structure.

In 2002 the dry ski slope near Park Road and the Uxbridge Lido was closed and the remaining buildings and structures removed. The Hillingdon Ski Centre had been subject to several arson attacks during 2001 and the company operating it became insolvent. The slope, which had been built in 1977, was left to return to nature.

Work began in 2008 to extensively refurbish and extend Uxbridge Lido, and it reopened to the public in February 2010 as the Hillingdon Sports and Leisure Complex. On 8 September 2010 the 75th anniversary of the first opening of the Lido was celebrated at the pool.

== Governance ==
Uxbridge is known from tithe assignments to the vicar of Hillingdon in 1281 and hundreds of later documents as a chapelry in the large parish of Hillingdon; the town core was upgraded to a full parish (and thus its large chapel to a church) in 1827. Eleven years later a parish of Saint John was added in Uxbridge Moor, Hillingdon. A parish of Saint Andrew, Uxbridge, was added in 1865. From Tudor times, parishes had a select or elect vestry which determined much local maintenance, including poor relief, but under the Poor Law Amendment Act 1834, broader local poor law unions took on the relief role and shifted funds towards workhouses and associated hospitals.

Uxbridge was in the first main wave of the new, secular system of civil parishes, gaining a council and territory in 1866, and an Urban District under the Local Government Act 1894. In 1955 the council successfully petitioned for a charter of incorporation and became a municipal borough. This stood for ten years, followed by incorporation into the new system of London Boroughs, as the London Borough of Hillingdon.

Uxbridge gave its name to a parliamentary constituency from 1885 until 2010, when boundary changes led to the creation of the Uxbridge and South Ruislip constituency. The seat is currently held by Danny Beales of the Labour Party.

Uxbridge is covered by the Uxbridge ward for elections to Hillingdon London Borough Council.

== Geography ==
Uxbridge

Climate chart (precipitation, max. and min. temperature)
| J | F | M | A | M | J | J | A | S | O | N | D |
| 51 8 3 | 44 9 2 | 43 12 4 | 51 14 5 | 52 18 8 | 46 21 11 | 44 23 13 | 75 23 13 | 50 20 10 | 67 16 7 | 62 11 4 | 58 8 3 |
- █ Average max. and min. temperatures in °C
- █ Precipitation totals in mm
- Source: World Weather Online
Imperial conversion
| J | F | M | A | M | J | J | A | S | O | N | D |
| 2 46 37 | 1.7 48 36 | 1.7 54 39 | 2 57 41 | 2 64 46 | 1.8 70 52 | 1.7 73 55 | 3 73 55 | 2 68 50 | 2.6 61 45 | 2.4 52 39 | 2.3 46 37 |
- █ Average max. and min. temperatures in °F
- █ Precipitation totals in inches

Uxbridge lies at a mean elevation of 130 feet (40 m) above mean sea level. Like much of the rest of the UK its climate is generally temperate, with few extremes of temperature or weather.

The landscape upon which the settlement of Uxbridge was established is largely unchanged from the Mesolithic era. Much of it was covered by oak and elm trees, which were gradually cleared by early settlers. An archaeological excavation by the Museum of London in the 1990s found evidence of flint items shaped by Mesolithic hunters, as well as various animal bones and traces of charcoal from the remains of campfires.

The River Pinn runs through Uxbridge, passing through the former site of RAF Uxbridge and the grounds of Brunel University. It joins the Frays River, which branches off from the River Colne and acts as the boundary between Uxbridge and the neighbouring county of Buckinghamshire.

Uxbridge is centred 15.4 miles (24.8 km) from Charing Cross in Central London; 3 miles (4.8 km) from Hayes; 3.1 miles (5.0 km) from Ruislip; 4.7 miles (7.6 km) from Northolt; 5.4 miles (8.7 km) from Slough; and 12.8 miles (20.6 km) from High Wycombe.

== Demography ==
The table below shows housing data for Uxbridge, broadly defined, and its neighbourhoods.

2011 Census homes %
| Ward | Detached | Semi-detached | Terraced | Flats and apartments |
|---|---|---|---|---|
| Brunel | 17.1% | 32.0% | 21.8% | 29.2% |
| Harefield | 15.4% | 37.9% | 23.8% | 22.7% |
| Hillingdon East | 5.9% | 34.2% | 45.1% | 14.7% |
| Ickenham | 45.3% | 40.3% | 5.0% | 9.4% |
| Uxbridge North | 30.1% | 28.5% | 15.1% | 26.2% |
| Uxbridge South | 7.8% | 30.3% | 20.7% | 40.6% |

The population of Uxbridge North was estimated in 2009 by the Office for National Statistics as 11,812, and 11,887 for Uxbridge South. Around 85% of residents of Uxbridge North are White, 6% more than both the borough average and Uxbridge South. Other residents are mixed-race, Asian or Asian British, Black or Black British, and Chinese or other ethnic groups. Uxbridge South has more Black and Chinese residents than any other Hillingdon ward.

By the time of the 2011 UK Census, the population of Uxbridge had reached 12,048 in Uxbridge North and 13,979 in Uxbridge South. The most common ethnic group in Uxbridge North was White British (69.8%), followed by Asian or Asian British (19.5%) and Black or Black British (4.1%). The remaining percentage was made up of mixed-race and other unspecified ethnic groups. White British was also the largest ethnic group in Uxbridge South, at 62.1%, followed by Asian or Asian British (22.6%), Black or Black British (7.3%) and mixed-race (4.3%). The remaining percentage was made up of other unspecified ethnic groups.

Uxbridge North's largest sector of employment, according to the 2001 and 2011 censuses, was management.

The life expectancy for men was estimated at 77 years in Uxbridge North, compared with 74 years in Uxbridge South. The figures for women are 83 years in Uxbridge North and 81 years in Uxbridge South.

== Religion ==
In the 2011 census, 72.8% of residents in the Uxbridge North ward answered that they had a religion, compared with 19.3% who did not and 7.9% who did not answer. Of those who answered, 53% identified as Christian, followed by 6.7% who identified as Muslim and 6.2% as Sikh. The percentage identifying as Hindu was 5.4%. Figures for residents identifying as either Jewish, Buddhist or other unspecified religions were each below 1%.

Within the Uxbridge South ward, 69.2% of residents answered that they had a religion, compared with 23.8% who did not and 7% who did not answer. As with Uxbridge North, the majority (46.4%) identified as Christian, followed by 13.4% who identified as Muslim and 5% as Hindu. The percentage identifying as Sikh was 2.3% and those identifying as Buddhist were 1.2%. Figures for residents identifying as either Jewish or other unspecified religions were each below 1%.

=== Churches ===
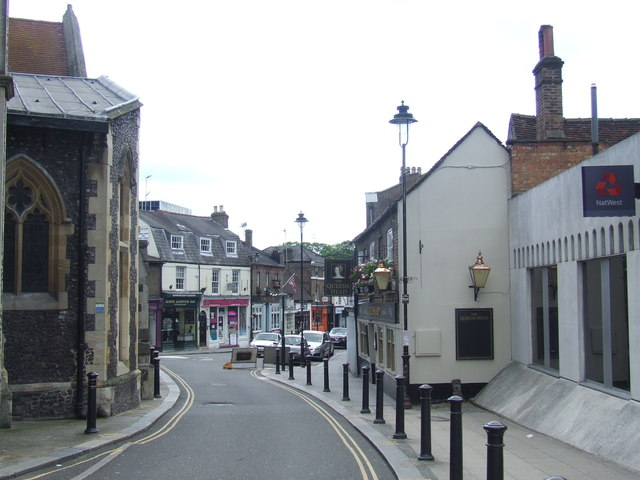
Windsor Street in Uxbridge, with St Margaret's Church visible on the left

==== St Margaret's Church ====
This is the original parish church of Uxbridge, and one of the oldest buildings in the town. Located in Windsor Street, it is known to have existed since at least 1245, when a series of hearings took place there in which the Abbot of Bec in Normandy brought an action against the rector of Great Wratting in Suffolk for non-payment of tithes. On parchments kept at St. George's Chapel, Windsor, in connection with this event, St. Margaret's is mentioned by name, and there are several other references between 1245 and 1247 to the "chapel at Uxbridge".

The oldest portion of the existing building is part of the north tower, which was built in the late 14th century. The north aisle, together with the nave and its arcades, dates from the early 15th century, while the south aisle, with its fine hammer-beam roof, was added about 1450. The carved stone font was placed in the church soon afterwards, dating from about 1480.

For most of its history, St Margaret's served as a chapel-of-ease to St John the Baptist's Church in Hillingdon; it was not until 1827 that it was given its own parish.

==== St Andrew's Church ====
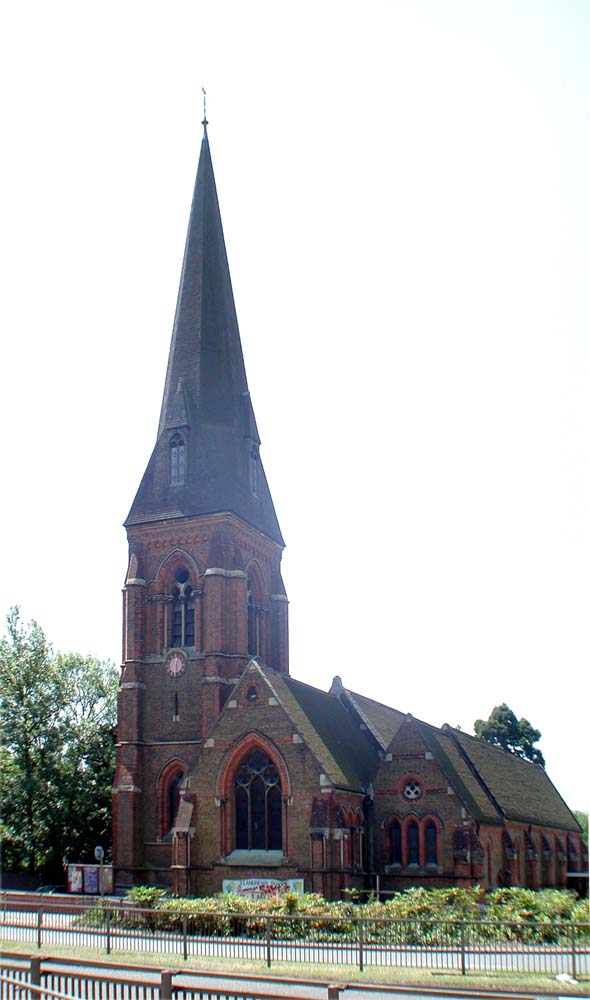
St Andrew's Church

By the 1850s the population of both Hillingdon and Uxbridge was beginning to rise. With new housing being built between the two centres the then Vicar of Hillingdon, Rev. Richard Croft (served 1856–69) gained permission to build a new local church for a newer part of the town traditionally called Hillingdon West. He asked architect Sir George Gilbert Scott "to draw up plans to build a church without unnecessary ornament but in handsome proportions suitable to its position at the entrance to Uxbridge Town..."

Scott produced his plans and local Uxbridge builder William Fassnidge was employed to construct the church. On St Peter's Day, 29 June 1864, the foundation stone was laid at the south end of the chancel arch by the Lord Bishop of London, Archibald Campbell Tait. He returned to consecrate and open the church on the feast day of saints Philip and James, 1 May 1865.

The spire was completed the following year. Together with the bells, vestry and organ and other embellishments, the building cost £12,000 (equivalent to £1,300,000 in 2025).

==== Church of Our Lady of Lourdes and St Michael ====
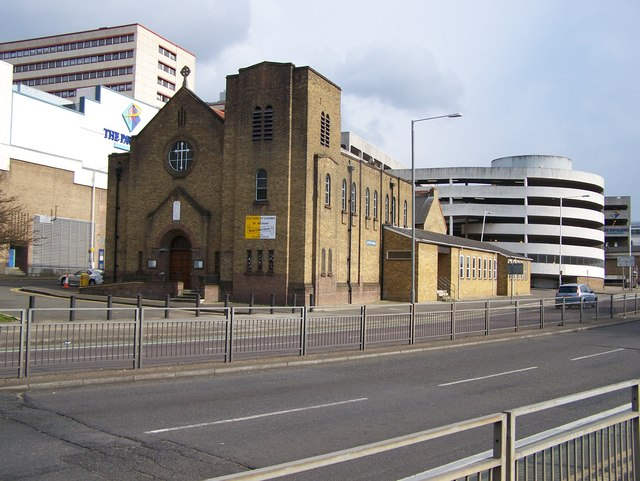
Church of Our Lady of Lourdes and St Michael

After the Reformation in the 16th century, there was no official Roman Catholic place of worship in Uxbridge until after the passing of the Catholic Emancipation Act in the late 19th century. In 1892 Father Michael Aloysius Wren bought a presbytery at 37 Lawn Road, next to which a temporary church of corrugated iron was built, dedicated to Our Lady of Lourdes and St Michael. St Mary's School was also founded on Rockingham Road at this time. Fr Wren was helped by his nephew John, who acted as his assistant priest. They covered an extensive area, including the modern Catholic parishes of Ruislip and Hillingdon.

The mission grew and by 1907 the congregation numbered 150, with school attendance at 60. In time plans were made for a larger, more permanent church. This was led by Father Thomas Moloney, who bought the current presbytery and acquired the land that stood at the back so that a church could be built. The foundation stone was eventually laid on Low Sunday 1931 by Archbishop Alban Goodier, an English Jesuit who had been Archbishop of Bombay between 1919 and 1926. The new church, in Oxford Road, was designed by the diocesan architect, T. H. B. Scott. It was built of brick in the Romanesque style, seating 350. The church was opened by Cardinal Bourne on 29 September 1931 and was officially consecrated on 14 May 1936, after its debts were cleared.

==== Faith Assembly, Uxbridge ====
The Redeemed Christian Church of God is based at 2 Harefield Road, worship is in the Kate Fasnidge Hall, it is contemporary and Pentecostal.

== Economy ==
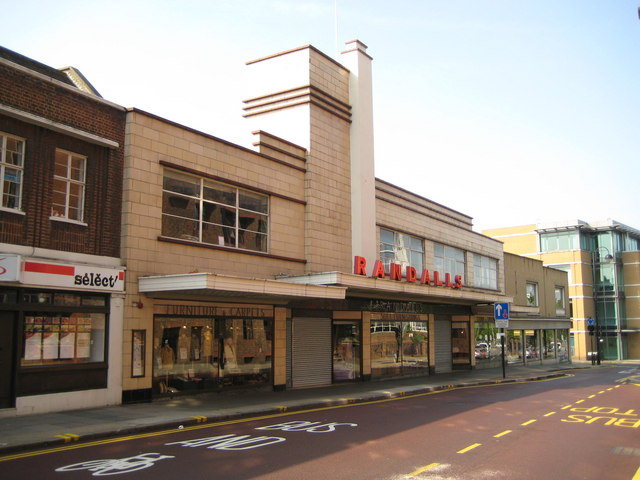
The former Randalls store is terraced, has a tower, and is in Art Deco style.

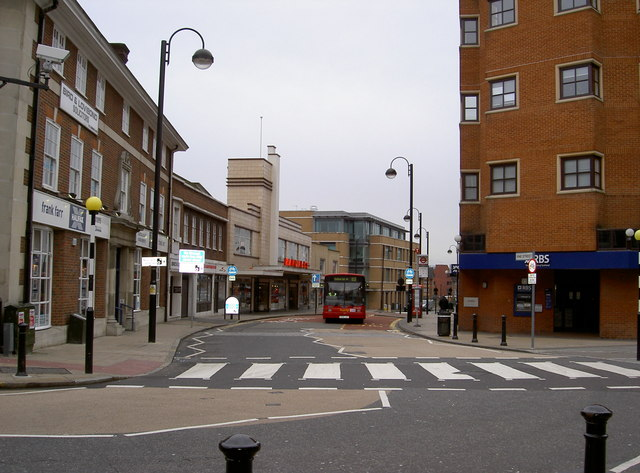
Looking down Vine Street from High Street

As of 2012, Uxbridge had 112,175 square metres (1,207,440 sq ft) of town centre floorspace. Uxbridge has two shopping centres, The Pavilions and The Chimes (formerly Intu Uxbridge). Much of the town centre is pedestrianised. Just off the High Street is Windsor Street, a short street with older shops.

The town centre consists of retail outlets and office buildings, including the main UK and European offices of international companies such as Coca-Cola European Partners, Cadbury, Xerox, General Mills, F. Hinds, PAREXEL, Arri, Bristol Myers Squibb, Monster Energy, APL, Herbalife Europe. Other employers include NetApp, Anixter International, PwC, WMS Gaming, IBB Solicitors and Nexen.

Within the London Borough, 55.1% of residents travel to the Uxbridge North and Uxbridge South wards to work, and only 8% of residents working there who also live within the wards. The 2001 census measured a total of 6,007 (35.9%) of residents leaving the North ward to go to work. Uxbridge South had a figure of 5,666 (26.5%) of residents leaving the ward to work elsewhere.

In 2005 retail footprint research, Uxbridge ranked 9th in terms of retail expenditure in Greater London at £311 million.

A terraced landmark with tower on Vine Street is what was Randalls, the Art Deco-architecture department store owned by relations of John Randall MP. It is a 1939, remodelled rebuilding of a 1900 building. The building has the initial, mainstream category of listed building since October 2008. The store closed in January 2015.

== Education ==
Primary schools in Uxbridge include Hermitage Primary School, St Andrew's Church of England Primary School, St Mary's Catholic Primary School, Whitehall Infant School, and Whitehall Junior School. Uxbridge High School is a comprehensive secondary school in the town.

Uxbridge is also home to Brunel University and the Buckinghamshire New University's nursing campus. The main campus of Uxbridge College is also in the town.

== Transport ==
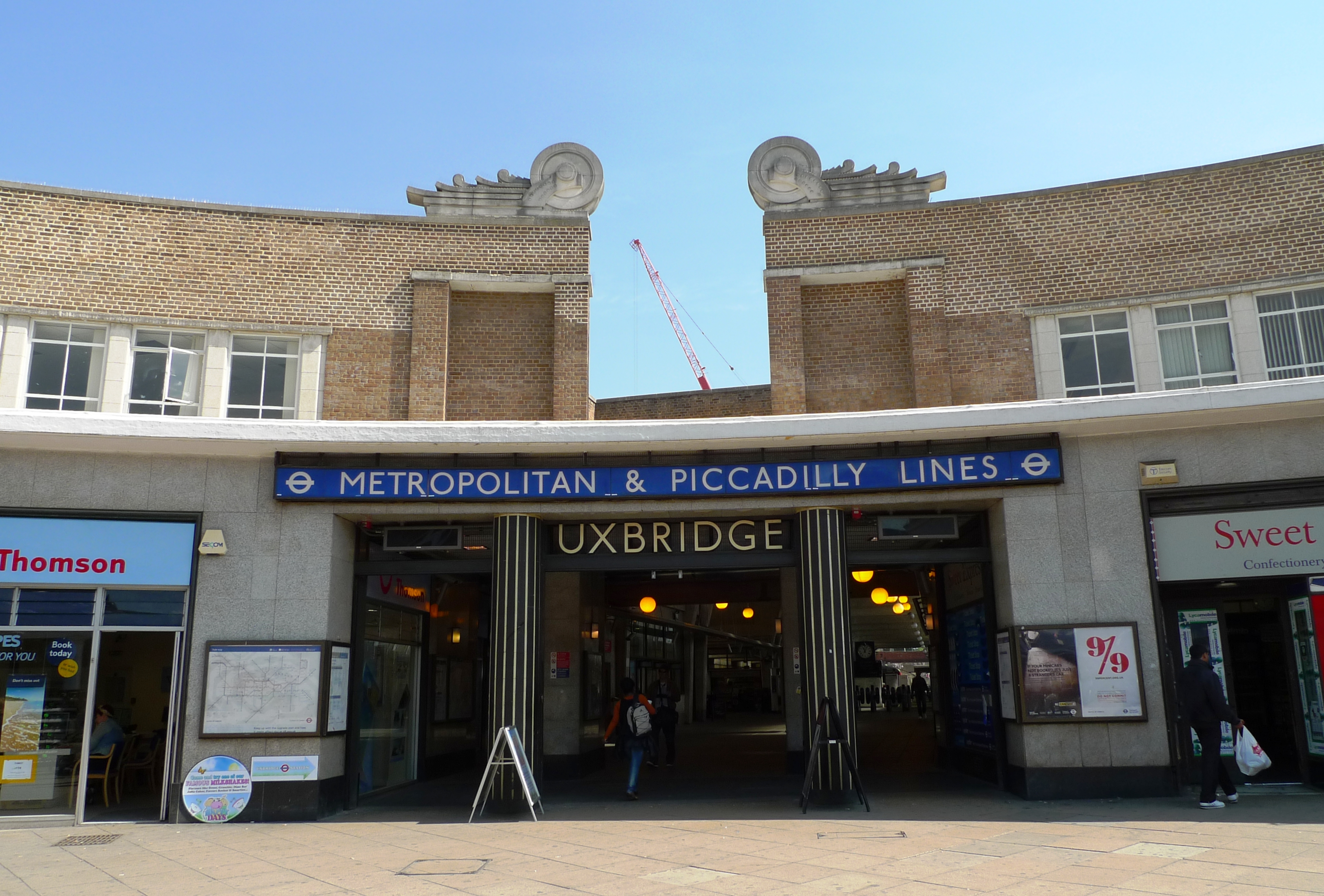
Frontage of Uxbridge tube station

Uxbridge tube station is the western terminus of branches of the Metropolitan and Piccadilly lines of the London Underground. The station, built in 1933, is fronted by a pedestrian high street and is connected to a bus terminus with connections to Hillingdon, Hayes, Ealing, Ruislip, and Slough. Uxbridge Belmont Road was the first underground station, built slightly outside the town centre to allow for a possible extension to High Wycombe. This was subsequently replaced by the current station.

There were two Great Western Railway branch lines to Uxbridge with terminus stations at Uxbridge Vine Street (originally just Uxbridge Station) and Uxbridge High Street. The two railway lines were planned to be joined, with a new Uxbridge station to be built on the west side of the town replacing the existing station at Vine Street which had been opened in 1856. Work on the new branch line from the north at Denham started in 1900. However with the Metropolitan Railway being extended into Uxbridge Belmont Road station in 1904 it was decided to temporarily terminate the line at a bridge over Uxbridge High Street. The extension through Uxbridge to join the lines was never completed. Uxbridge High Street station opened on 1 May 1907 but had low passenger numbers and closed on 1 September 1939 as a war economy and never reopened. By the 1960s the Uxbridge Vine Street branch line to West Drayton station was being affected by competition on London services from the town's faster Underground lines. Passenger services were stopped on 10 September 1962. Goods traffic ceased two years later. Uxbridge Vine Street station was demolished in 1965.

The B483 road connects the centre of Uxbridge with the Swakeleys Roundabout junction of the A40. Uxbridge is also connected by major roads to Slough, Denham, Ickenham, Cowley, Iver Heath, Hillingdon Heath and Hayes.

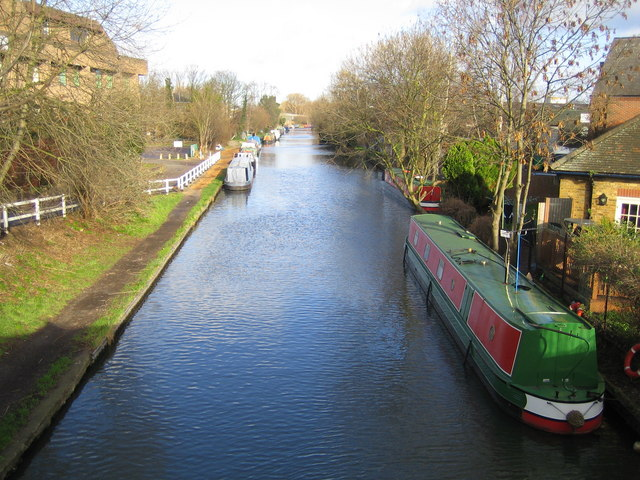
The Grand Union Canal in Uxbridge was opened in 1794.

The Grand Union Canal, formerly the Grand Junction Canal, connects London with Birmingham and passes immediately to the west of Uxbridge, forming part of the borough boundary. The first stretch was built in the late 18th century from Brentford to Uxbridge. Further upstream is Uxbridge Lock, and nearby is a derelict flour mill formerly owned by Allied Mills. The mill was bought in the 19th century by William King, who named it "Kingsmill". Kingsmill continues to be used as a brand of bread by Associated British Foods.

London Buses routes 222, 331, 427, 607, A10, U1, U2, U3, U4, U5, U7, U9, U10 and N207 serve the area, alongside 8 non-Transport for London (TfL) routes: First Berkshire & The Thames Valley route 3, Green Line route 724 and Carousel Buses routes 101, 102, 104, 105, 581 & 583.

The proposed West London Tram was postponed indefinitely by TfL in August 2007 after it was announced that the Crossrail project would be going ahead. TfL cited "an effective bus-based solution" as an alternative, delivered in conjunction with local councils. Since 2013 the route has been served by the 427, 207, and 607 bus services.

== Landmarks ==
=== Civic Centre ===
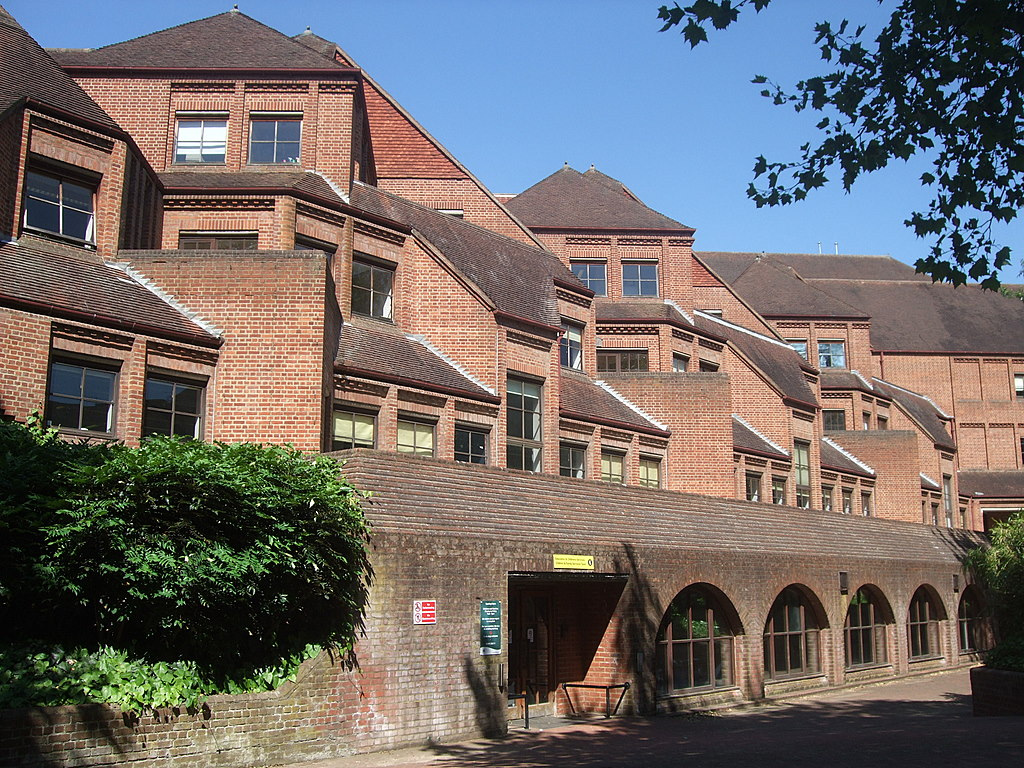
View of part of the Hillingdon Civic Centre

The London Borough of Hillingdon's Hillingdon Civic Centre was built in Uxbridge High Street in 1973, as part of an effort to unite the services of the council, which had formed in 1965 with the merger of the Municipal Borough of Uxbridge, Ruislip-Northwood Urban District, Hayes and Harlington Urban District and Yiewsley and West Drayton Urban District. Before the new building was completed, council services had been spread throughout Uxbridge and the rest of the borough and various buildings, as a result of the merging of the former district councils.

Part of the original Middlesex County Council office building that stood on site was incorporated into the new Civic Centre. The centre's clock tower is the only visible section from the old building. The Uxbridge Cricket Club Ground and Uxbridge fire station were relocated as part of the new development, which became controversial owing to its size and cost. Areas of the building, particularly the council chambers, continue to suffer from poor acoustics.

=== Uxbridge Magistrates' Court ===
The original Magistrates' Court opened in 1907 in an Edwardian style. A new building with little exterior styling opened nearby in the 1990s and legal proceedings were transferred.

=== RAF Uxbridge, Battle of Britain Bunker and Hillingdon House ===
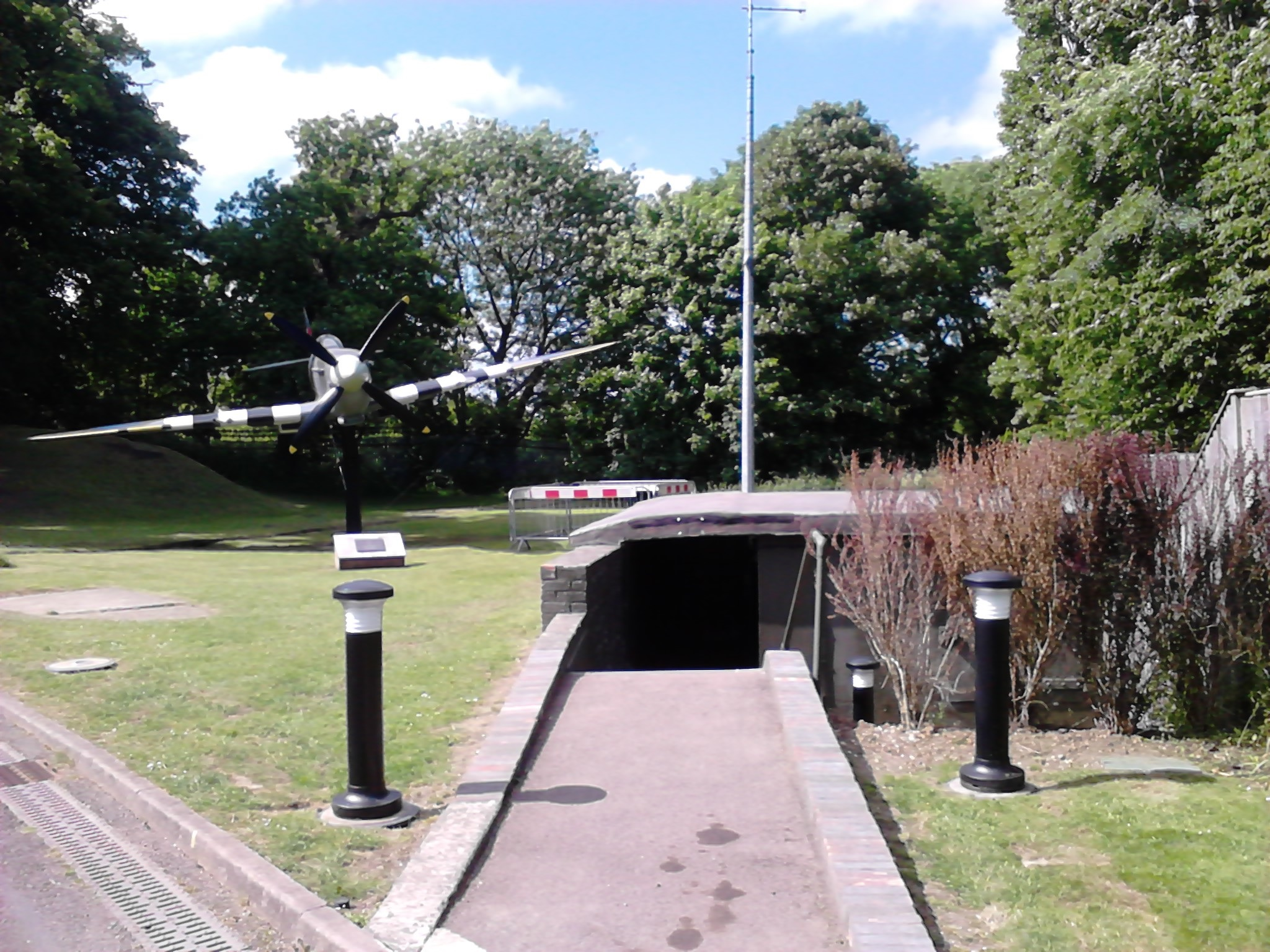
Replica Spitfire gate guardian beside the Battle of Britain Bunker

Uxbridge had a Royal Air Force station, known as RAF Uxbridge, until its closure on 31 March 2010. The station was built within the grounds of Hillingdon House, a 19th-century mansion bought by the British government in 1915, and became the home of RAF Fighter Command's No. 11 Group Operations Room during the Battle of Britain. Fighter squadrons at airfields in the south-east of England were directed from the station, which was visited by Prime Minister Winston Churchill during the battle, and other foreign leaders throughout the rest of the war.

Following the station's closure, the replica No. 33 Squadron Supermarine Spitfire gate guardian was removed from the main entrance for restoration work and moved to the entrance of the Operations Room (now known as the Battle of Britain Bunker). The area around the bunker was retained as an enclave under the RAF Uxbridge name, under the care of RAF Northolt. An additional guardian, a Hawker Hurricane in the colours of No. 303 (Polish) Squadron, was added to the area in November 2010.

== Sport and leisure ==
Uxbridge has a Non-League football team, Uxbridge F.C., which plays at Honeycroft, Yiewsley. Uxbridge Cricket Club is also based in Uxbridge and is a member of the Middlesex County Cricket League, a designated ECB Premier League. Hillingdon Sports and Leisure Complex was refurbished in 2010 and contains an indoor and outdoor swimming pool, an athletic track and large sports complex. The South Korean Olympic Team used the centre for training during the 2012 Olympic Games.

== Notable people ==
=== 18th century ===
- John Lightfoot (1735–1788), parson-naturalist, conchologist and botanist, died in Uxbridge.

=== 19th century ===
- Charles Brown (1827–1905), engineer and inventor of the Brown valve gear, born in Uxbridge.
- Annie Isherwood (1862–1906), Anglican nun and founder of the Community of the Resurrection in Grahamstown, Southern Africa, was born in Uxbridge.

=== 20th century ===
- Bernard Miles (1907–1991), actor, writer and director, attended Bishopshalt Grammar School and given a peerage.
- Peggy Eileen Whistler (1909–1958), poet, novelist and illustrator who used the pseudonym Margiad Evans, born in Uxbridge,
- Joan Dowling (1928–1954), actress, best known for her role in the first "Ealing Comedy" Hue and Cry, grew up in Uxbridge.
- John Stears (1934–1999), Academy Award-winning creator of James Bond's Aston Martin DB5 and Star Wars robots, born in Uxbridge.
- Christine Keeler (1942–2017), 1960s model, party to the 1963 Profumo affair, born in Uxbridge.
- Rianna Dean (born 1998), footballer for Southampton

== See also ==
- Uxbridge English Dictionary
