= Battersea Library =

Battersea Library may refer to:

- Battersea Central Library, a municipal lending library established in 1890 on Lavender Hill in Battersea, London
- Battersea Reference Library, a municipal reference library established in 1924 in Altenburgh Gardens, and connected to the Battersea Central Library
