= Battersea Arts Centre =

Performance space in London, England

- 1893: Vestry of St. Mary; 1900: Battersea Town Hall
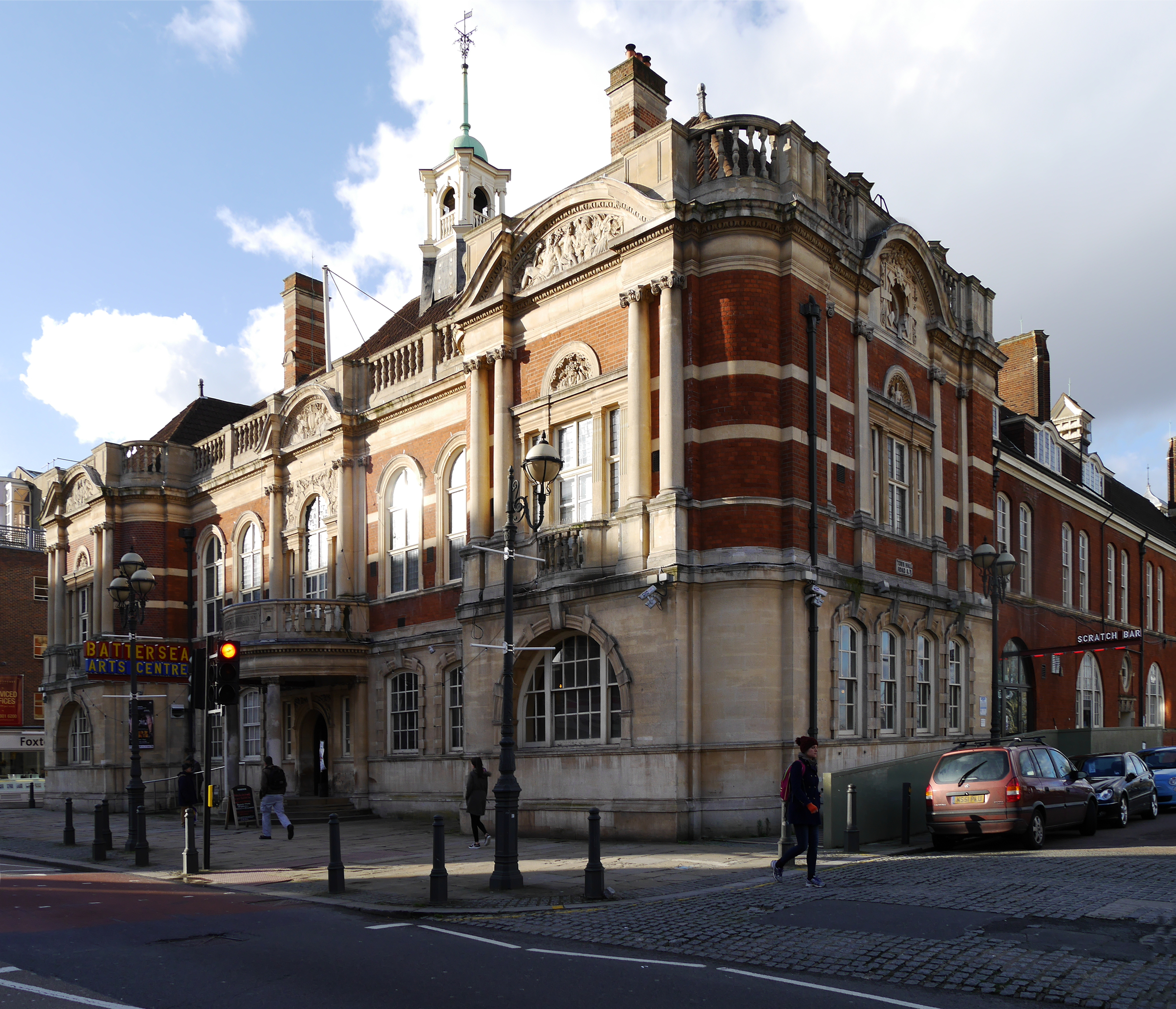
- Interactive map of Battersea Arts Centre
- Address: Lavender Hill; London, SW11; United Kingdom
- Coordinates: 51.4648°N 0.1607°W
- Owner: BAC Trust
- Capacity: 640 (500 Grand Hall; 140 Lower Hall)
- Type: Producing house
- Designation: Grade II* listed
- Public transit: Clapham Junction

Construction
- Opened: 1981; 45 years ago
- Architect: E. W. Mountford

Website
- www.bac.org.uk

The Battersea Arts Centre ("BAC") is a performance space specialising in theatre productions. Located near Clapham Junction railway station in Battersea, in the London Borough of Wandsworth, it was formerly Battersea Town Hall. It is a Grade II* listed building.

In March 2015, while a major programme of renovation works were underway, the Grand Hall was severely damaged by fire. Approximately 70% of the theatre, including the 200-capacity Council Chamber, the Scratch Bar and the Members Library, was saved from the fire and remains open.

The building is now used for theatre shows, weddings, filming, shoots and meeting room hire.

== History ==
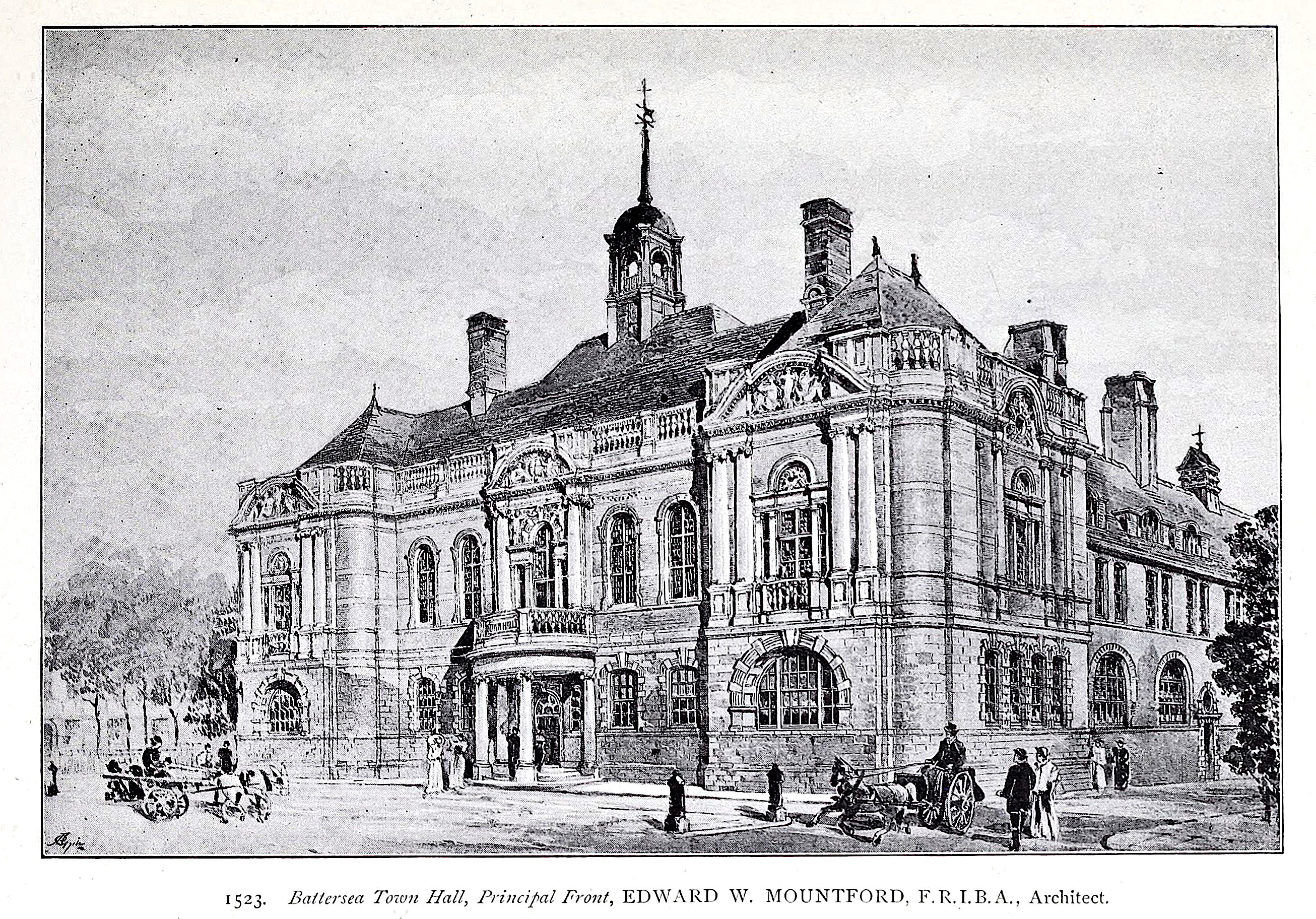
Battersea Town Hall in 1893

The building, designed in 1891 by E. W. Mountford, opened in 1893 as Battersea Town Hall, the administrative headquarters of the Borough of Battersea, shortly after the borough was transferred from the county of Surrey to the newly formed County of London. It is built from Suffolk red brick and Bath stone, on the site of Jane Senior's Elm House, a villa with a small wooded estate.

Bertrand Russell's essay Why I Am Not a Christian was originally given as a talk in the hall, on 6 March 1927, under the auspices of the South London Branch of the National Secular Society.

Following proposals by London Borough of Wandsworth to demolish large parts of the building, a vociferous and ultimately successful campaign to save it was fought by the Victorian Society and Battersea Society it was given Grade II* listed protected status in February 1970.

=== Organ ===
In 1901, a large pipe organ was installed in the Grand Hall by Norman & Beard. This was an unusual instrument designed by Robert Hope-Jones, a pioneering organ builder who invented many aspects of the modern pipe organ. His ideas went on to form the basis of the Wurlitzer theatre organ in the 1920s and 30s. It was said to be the largest Hope-Jones organ to survive, and was partially restored in 2008–2009. In the 2015 fire, although much of the organ was destroyed, including the console, bellows, wiring and architectural cases, the soundboards and much of the pipework survived as they were off site undergoing restoration. A specification of the organ can be found on the National Pipe Organ Register.

=== Arts centre ===
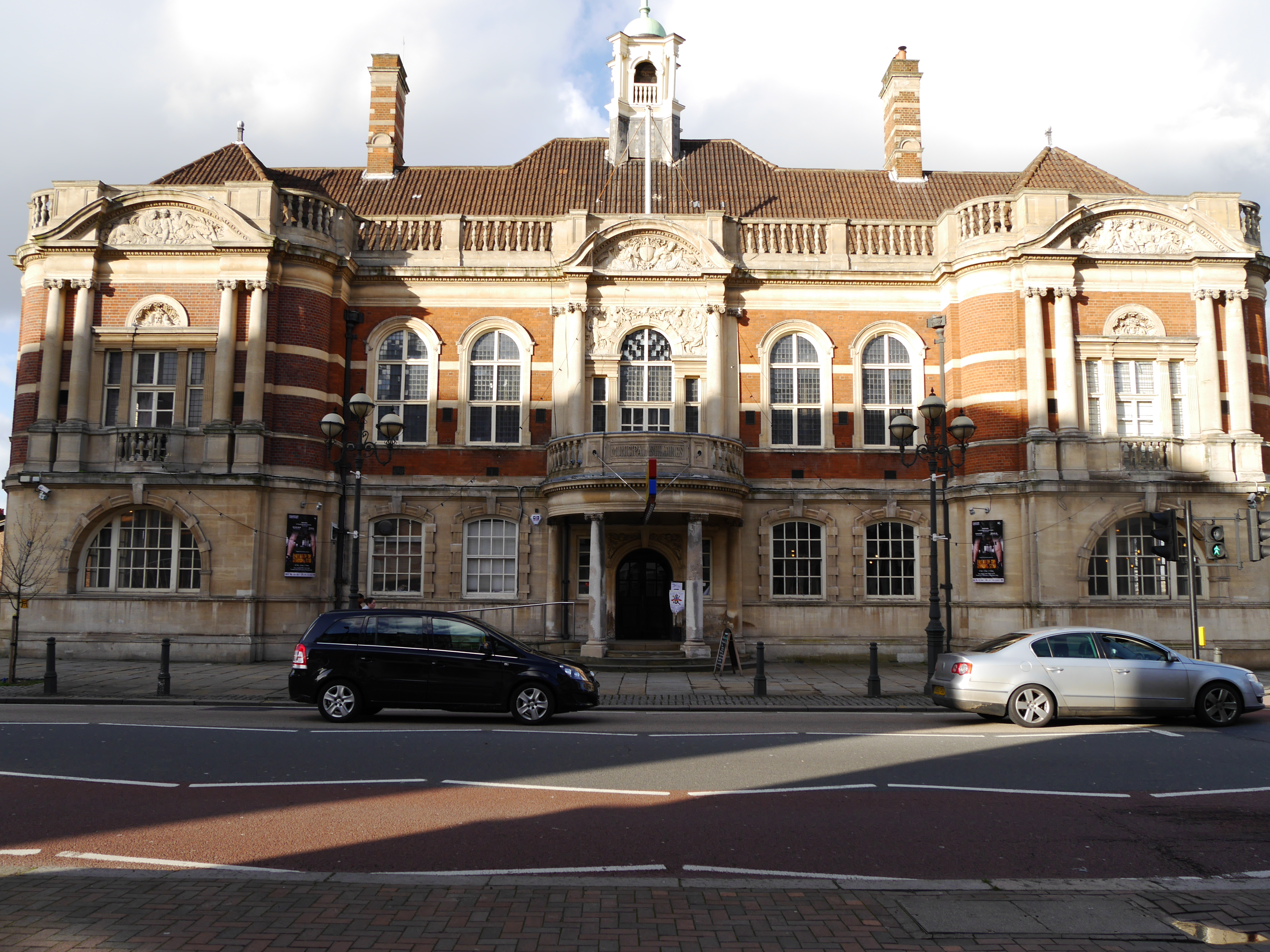
Battersea Arts Centre

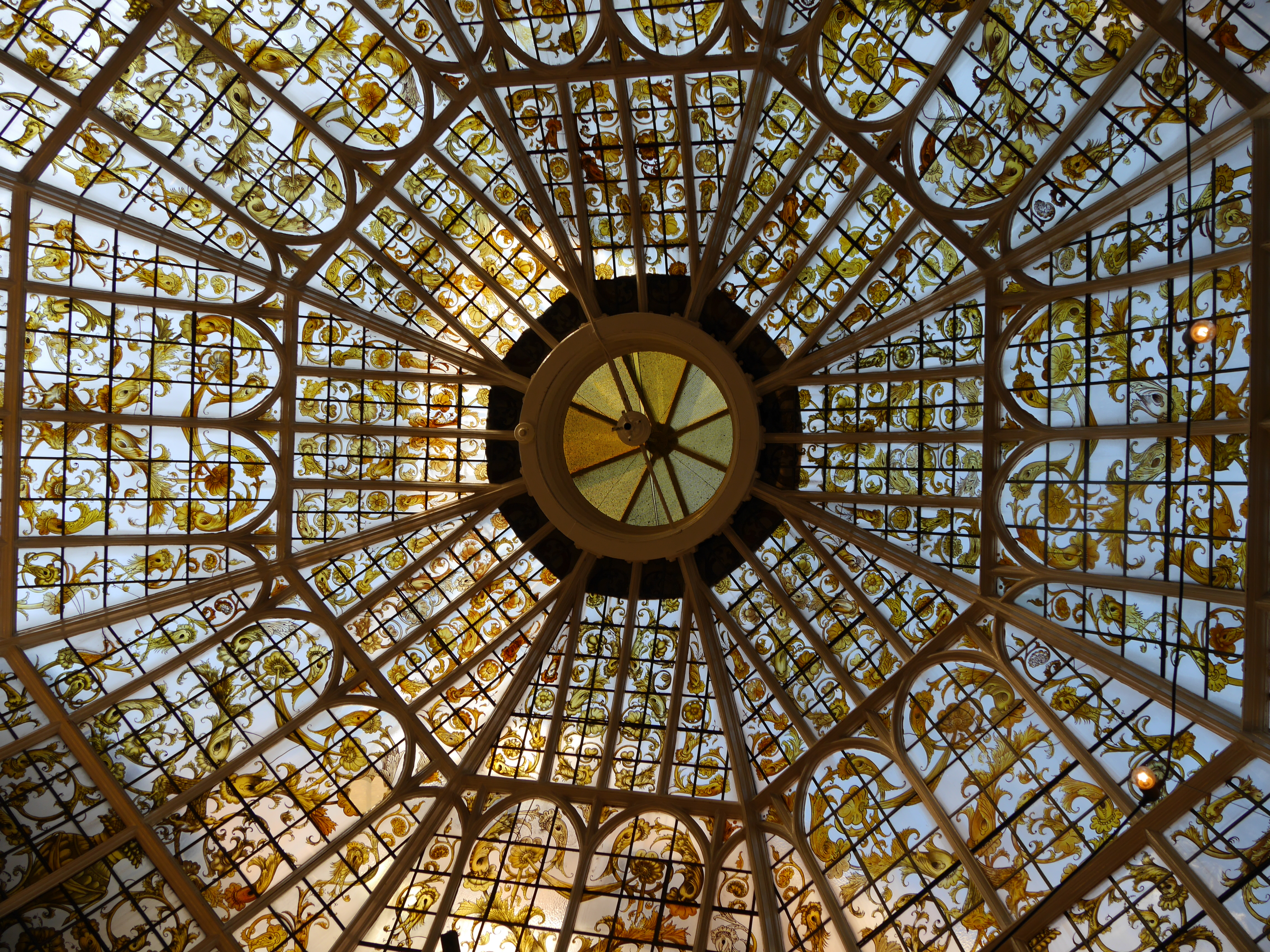
Interior

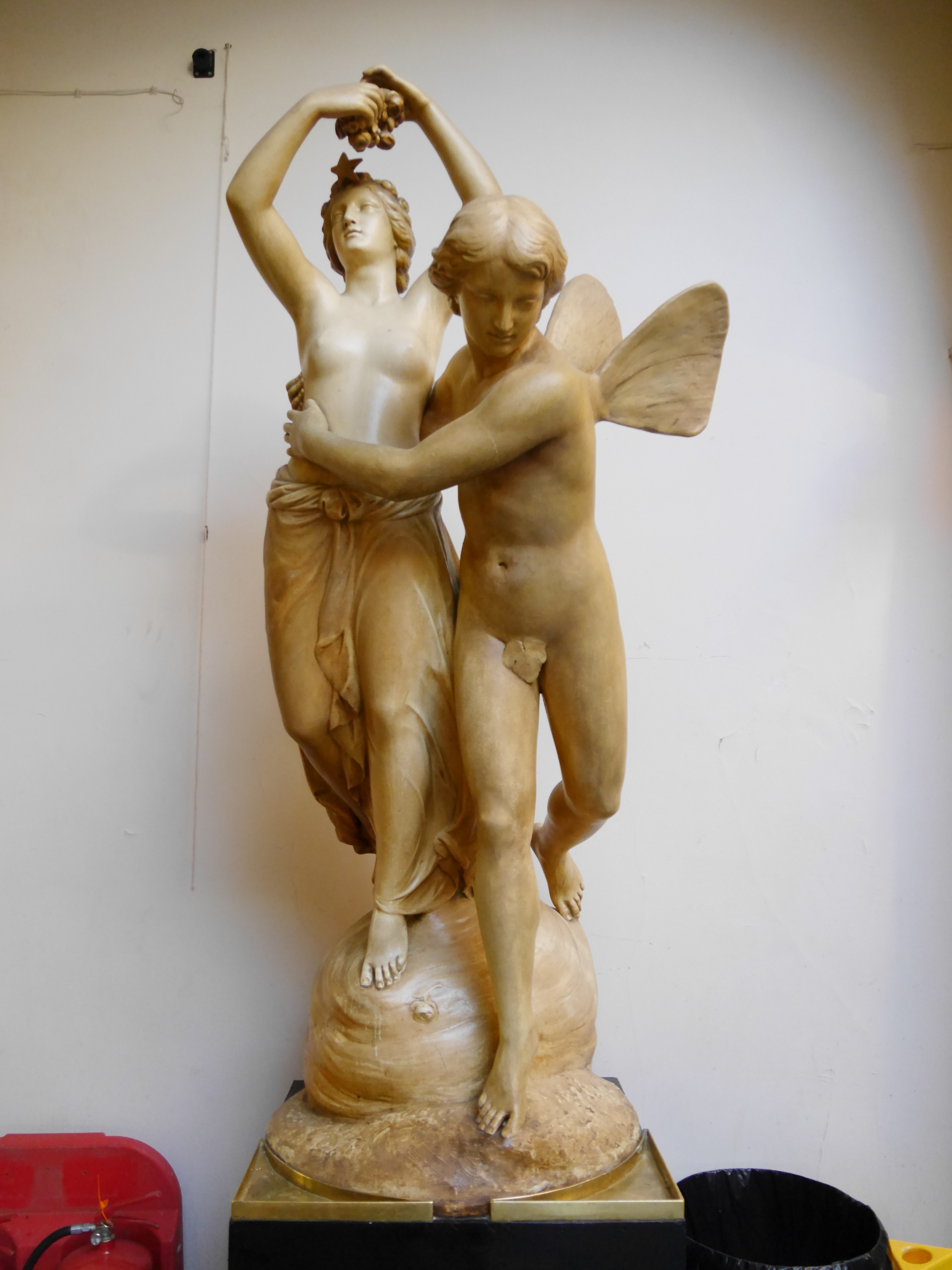
William Calder Marshall – Zephyr and Aurora

The building became a community arts centre in 1974. BAC currently receives grants towards the building's operating costs from Arts Council England and the London Borough of Wandsworth, among others. The centre is a registered charity. The theatre was founded in 1981.

Following the departure of Tom Morris in 2003, David Jubb became Battersea Arts Centre's Artistic Director in 2004, serving as Joint Artistic Director with David Micklem between 2007 and 2012. In October 2018, David Jubb announced that he would step down from his role in April 2019. Tarek Iskander is Battersea Arts Centre's current Artistic Director and CEO, appointed in December 2018.

BAC operates a "scratch" methodology as part of its "ladder of development" for new work. Performances are shown at various stages of development to an outside audience, whose input and criticism guides the further evolution of the work.

==== Past productions ====
- Punchdrunk Theatre Company's promenade performance of "The Masque of the Red Death" by Edgar Allan Poe ran through most of the building from September 2007 to April 2008. The performance was interactive, and was seen by over 400,000 people over its seven-month sellout run. Since audience members were required to wear masks throughout the performance, a number of famous actors attended the play anonymously, including Jeff Goldblum and Joanna Lumley.
- Richard Thomas's early work as Kombat Opera, including Tourette's Diva, leading to the development of Jerry Springer - The Opera, which premièred at BAC in 2002, before transferring to the Royal National Theatre.
- Jackson's Way, the winner of the 2004 Perrier Award in Edinburgh. A one-man show which mocks the world of motivational speaking and embraces it through encouraging 'pointless actions'.

=== Use in film and TV ===
The old Town Hall was used as a location in the 1975 film Slade In Flame featuring rock band Slade. The Town Hall was the location for the 21st birthday party of the character played by Dave Hill.

On 8 and 9 October 2012, the pop band McFly used the location to film a video for their single Love Is Easy.

The Sky Arts TV series Portrait Artist of the Year is filmed at BAC.

=== Beer festival ===
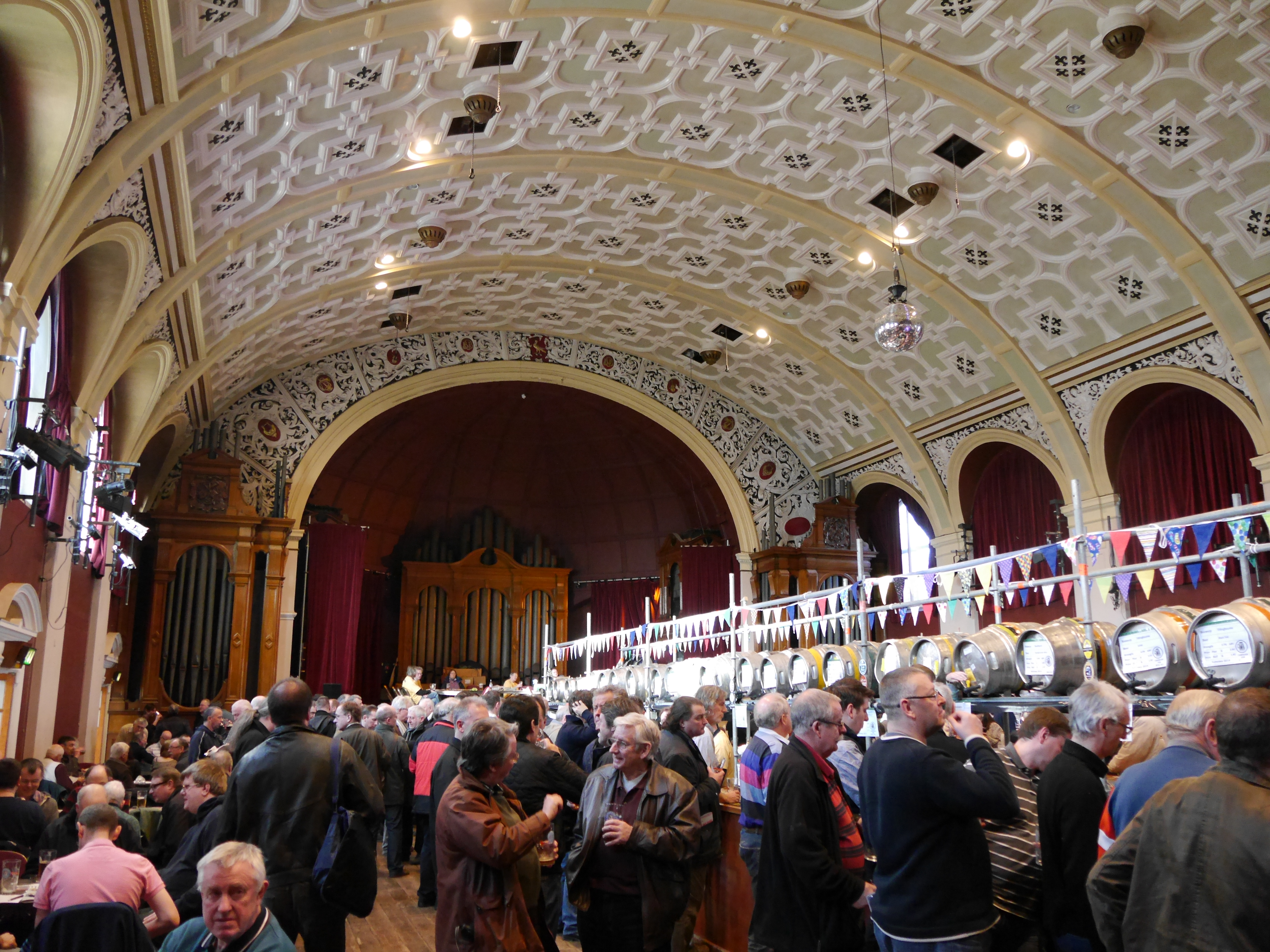
Battersea Beer Festival in the Great Hall, before the 2015 fire destroyed the vaulted roof and wall decorations.

Every February since 1991, the BAC has hosted the three-day-long Battersea Beer Festival.

=== Murders ===
On 31 January 1998 the Annual Rockers Reunion was held at the centre. Members of the Outcasts Motorcycle Club served as the security at the reunion. In a coordinated attack via microphone headsets, about 40 members of the Hells Angels from various chapters all over England arrived uninvited at the reunion armed with baseball bats, knives, iron bars and machetes. The Hells Angels proceeded to attack and beat various Outcasts. Two of the Outcasts, David Armstrong and Malcolm St. Clair, were killed during the melee. Only one Hells Angel was convicted of charges relating to the incident. Ronald "Gut" Wait, the vice president of the Angels Essex chapter, was convicted of conspiracy to cause grievous bodily harm.

=== Fire ===
On 13 March 2015, during a major renovation programme, a fire broke out in the roof, and engulfed the building, causing severe structural damage, including the collapse of the tower. The Grand Hall and Lower Hall were destroyed. No injuries were reported.

The fire was tackled by about 80 London Fire Brigade firefighters and 12 fire engines. Firefighters were able to save a large part of the building including several of the smaller theatre spaces. Two shows went ahead as planned one day after the fire, and BAC has maintained much of its artistic programme, despite losing the ability to hire out the larger venues (a significant source of income).

Jubb launched a fundraising campaign to help the centre soon afterwards., and in May announced that during the rebuilding of the Grand Hall, BAC would also create a large off-site theatre from mid-2016 to end of 2017 "for the presentation of visionary and exciting new theatre while we rebuild the Grand Hall".

In 2018, the rebuilding of the Grand Hall was completed, overseen by architects Haworth Tompkins, who had been working with BAC on a phased transformation of the centre for over a decade. The vaulted plaster ceiling of the Grand Hall was replaced with a similar design in three layers of CNC-cut plywood; adjacent corridors were left scorched and bare of plaster. The mosaic floor, manufactured by Jess Rust in the 19th century, survived the fire.
