= Electric House =

Electric House may refer to:

- The Electric House, a 1922 American short comedy film
- Electric House, Battersea, a 1927 electricity showroom building in London
