= Henry Hyams =

Henry Hyams may refer to:

- Henry Hyams (architect), British architect
- Henry M. Hyams (1806–1875), American lawyer and lieutenant governor of Louisiana

== See also ==
- Harry Hyams (1928–2015), British property developer
