= Electric House, Battersea =

Electricity showroom in Battersea, London, England

Coordinates: 51.464285°N 0.164868°W

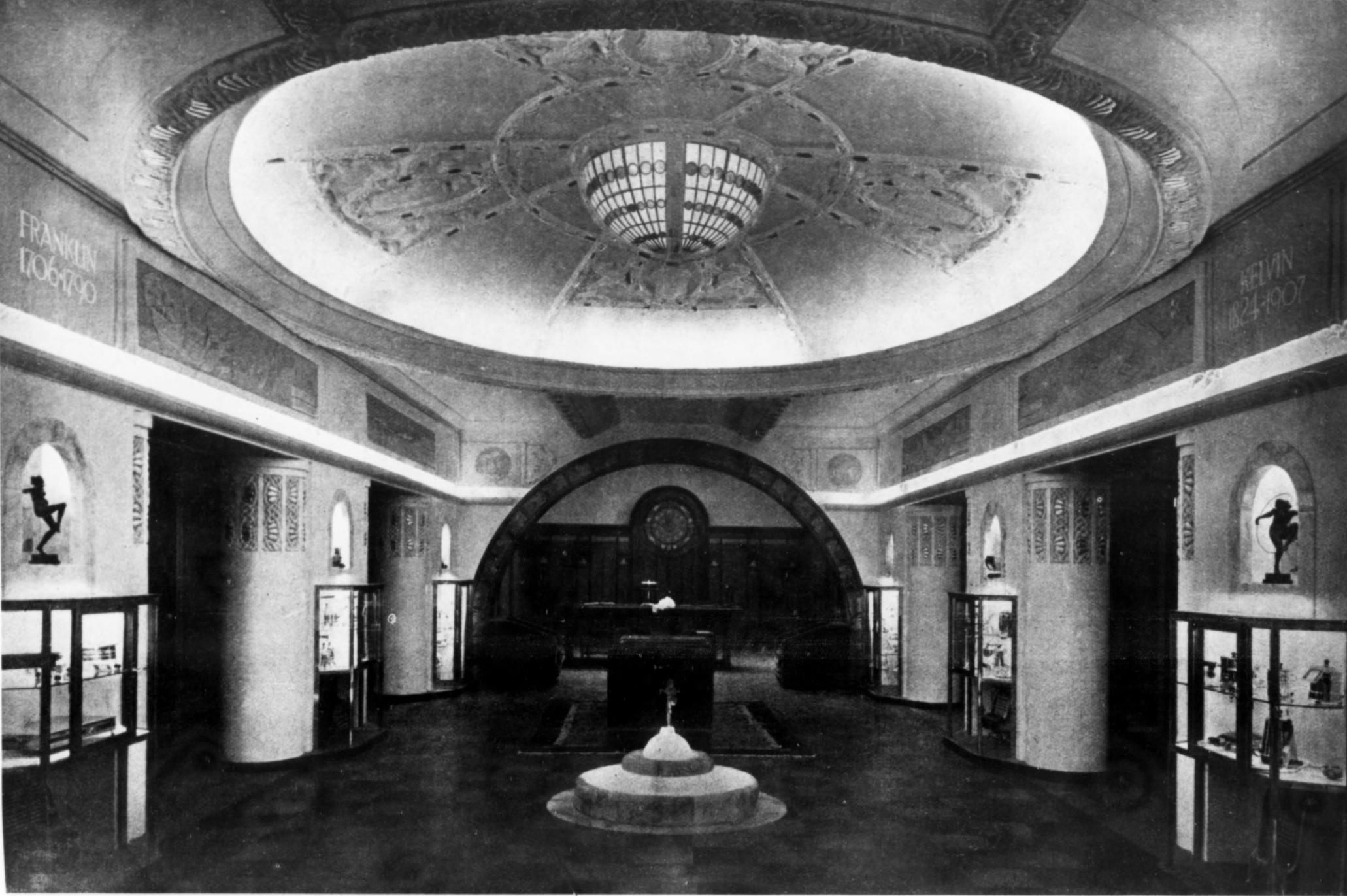
Main hall of Electric House

Electric House was an electricity showroom building built on Lavender Hill, Battersea, London, England, by Battersea Borough Council. The building, opened in 1927, was broadly to a design by Henry Hyams, and was described as combining a 'fin-de-siècle manner' with 'up-to-the-minute Art Deco taste'. It was demolished in 1985.

== Background ==
The supply of electricity in Battersea dates from 1901, when a power station situated on Lombard Street, near the River Thames, commissioned by Battersea Vestry under the Battersea Electric Lighting Order, 1896, was completed by Battersea Borough Council. The power station initially supplied direct current, used for diverse purposes including street lighting and tramway power. In 1915 its design was amended to supply alternating current, and it was linked, first to power stations at Hammersmith and Fulham, and later to the nascent National Grid.

Battersea Council took the initiative, in the late 1920s, to commission an electricity showroom to encourage uptake of the new technology within the borough.

== Electric House ==
Electric House was erected on Lavender Hill, west of the Post Office sorting office, occupying an area of 4,000 square feet (370 m^{2}) and with a frontage of nearly 65 feet (20 m). The building is credited to Battersea's Borough Surveyor, T. W. A Hayward, its Electrical Engineer, F. Bond, and particularly to Henry Hyams, an architect and structural engineer employed by the Borough who is noted for a number of distinctive building interiors. The Builder magazine comment that 'it is evident' that Hyams 'has put a great deal of thought into a work which is full of interest'. Hyams had previously been responsible for the design of Battersea Reference Library, opened in 1924.

Electric House was opened on 29 October 1927. It was a steel-framed, brick-built building, faced with Portland stone, of six stories including the basement and a dormer fifth floor of green Westmorland slate with projecting windows. In keeping with its showcase brief, four pilasters on the frontage were extensively illuminated by up and down floodlights above the signage fascia and below the eaves. Planted stone window boxes above the fascia had hidden illumination. A projecting illuminated electric clock was mounted on the building, its dials visible up and down Lavender Hill. On the ground floor, lighting in the soffits of four arches illuminated the entrance.

Behind the arches, central bronze swing entrance doors were flanked by two shop windows. Within, a central hall with illuminated fountain gave access to eight demonstration rooms, four on each side. On the left, a bathroom featured an electric geyser for the bath and handbasin, and an electrically heated mirror and towel rail; the bedroom, an electric ire beneath its window. The drawing room featured cornice lighting and window heating; a science room demonstrated daylight-quality lighting. On the right, a kitchen featured electrically heated hot water, an electric washing machine and an electric refrigerator. The dining room demonstrated the use of electricity in "heating a part of the room which is usually the coldest".

The basement consisted of showrooms, stores, a repair shop, unpacking room, storekeeper's office, and switch room. The first floor had a large demonstration and lecture hall and the borough electrical engineer's office with waiting room and typist's room adjoining. The second, third, and part of the fourth floor contained offices and a small flat.

Public areas were richly ornamented; the exterior was paved in light and dark green marble. Greek Cippolino marble columns flanked the entrance doors, above which were a carved San Stefano marble panel of the borough arms and symbols of electricity. The caps of the columns were also carved with symbols of electricity. The central hall's marble fountain was lit with concealed electric lamps and featured an opalescent, stained-glass bowl. On the walls, above bronze showcases, were niches lit by electricity and built of marble partly inlaid with onyx stones to landscape motives. The back part of the hall was panelled in walnut, with inlay wood decorative panels, and an inlay wood electric clock. The ceiling was an elliptical dome in fibrous plaster, and the frieze below this decorated with panels in blue and gold, showing in conventional rendering of the use of electricity in the city, on the land, under the sea, and so on. A columned opening led into an oak hall, providing access to a lift, and featuring a stone fireplace with an electric fire of burning logs, an electric grandfather clock with an inlay-wood panel of St Mary's Church, Battersea, and oak fireside seats featuring a variety of electric light fittings.

Hyams's Art Deco interior design was removed in 1956, and the interior was largely whitewashed. In 1961, the frontage was altered to extend the interior up to the arches. In 1985, the building was demolished as part of a wider redevelopment in its immediate area.
