= Henry Hyams (architect) =

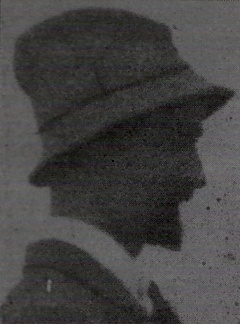

Henry Hyams was a British architect active in the early 20th century, mainly known for his design of two restaurants in Devon, and for two buildings in Battersea. He was an Esperanto instructor and in World War I, a conscientious objector.

== Biography ==
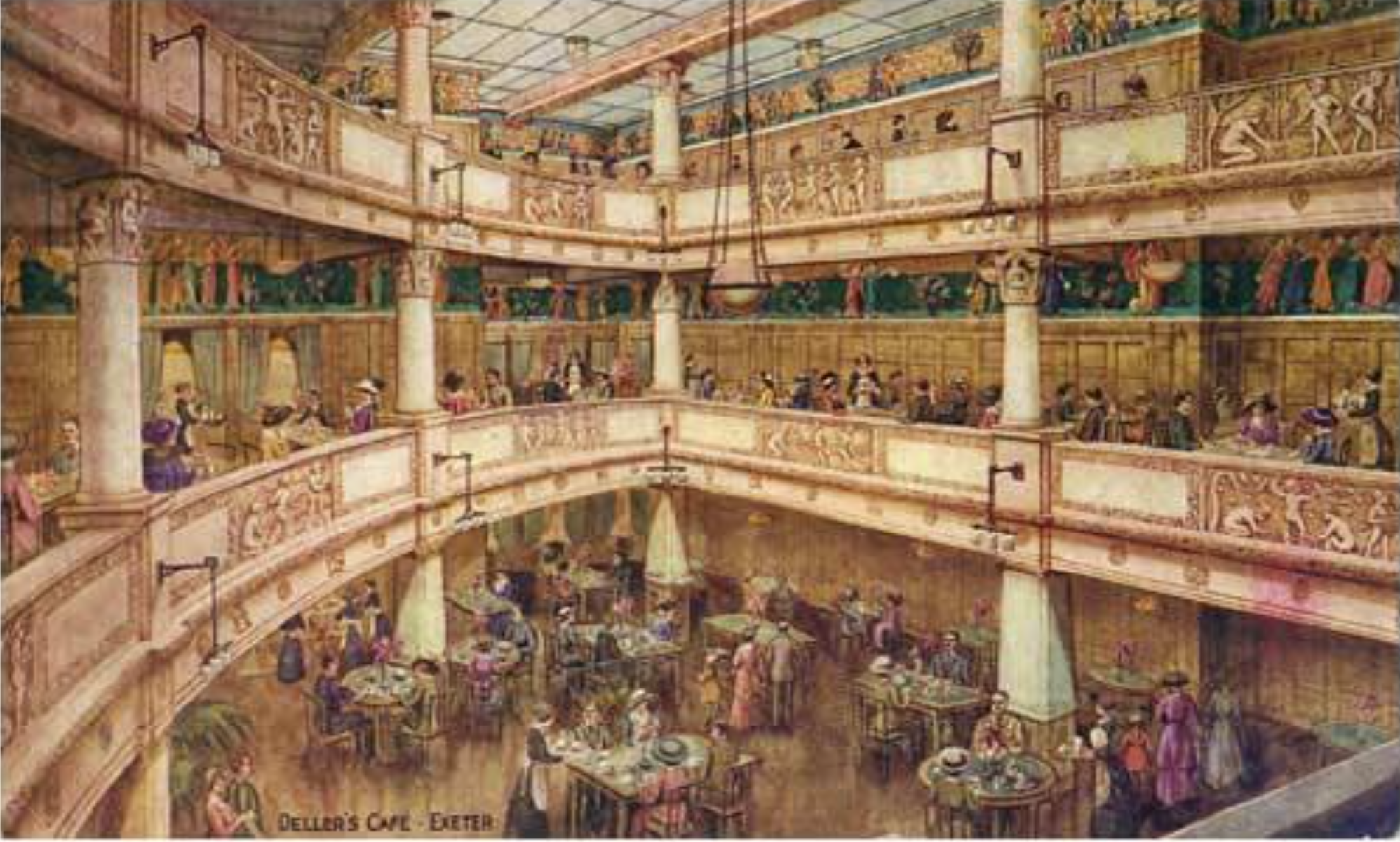
Interior of Deller's Cafe, Exeter, c.1920

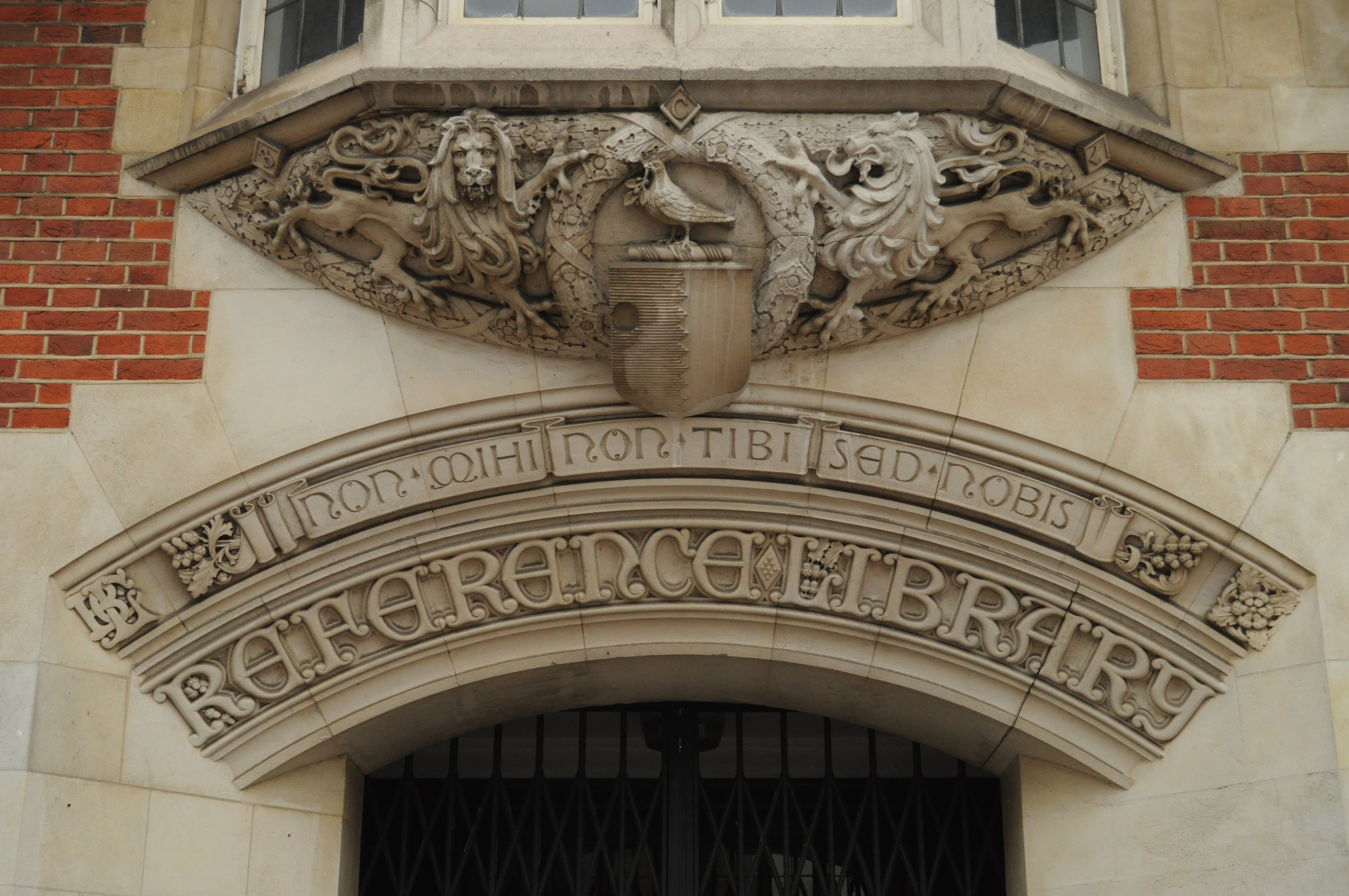
Detail of Hyams' work at Battersea: the base of an oriel window, and arch of the entrance porch door of Battersea Reference Library

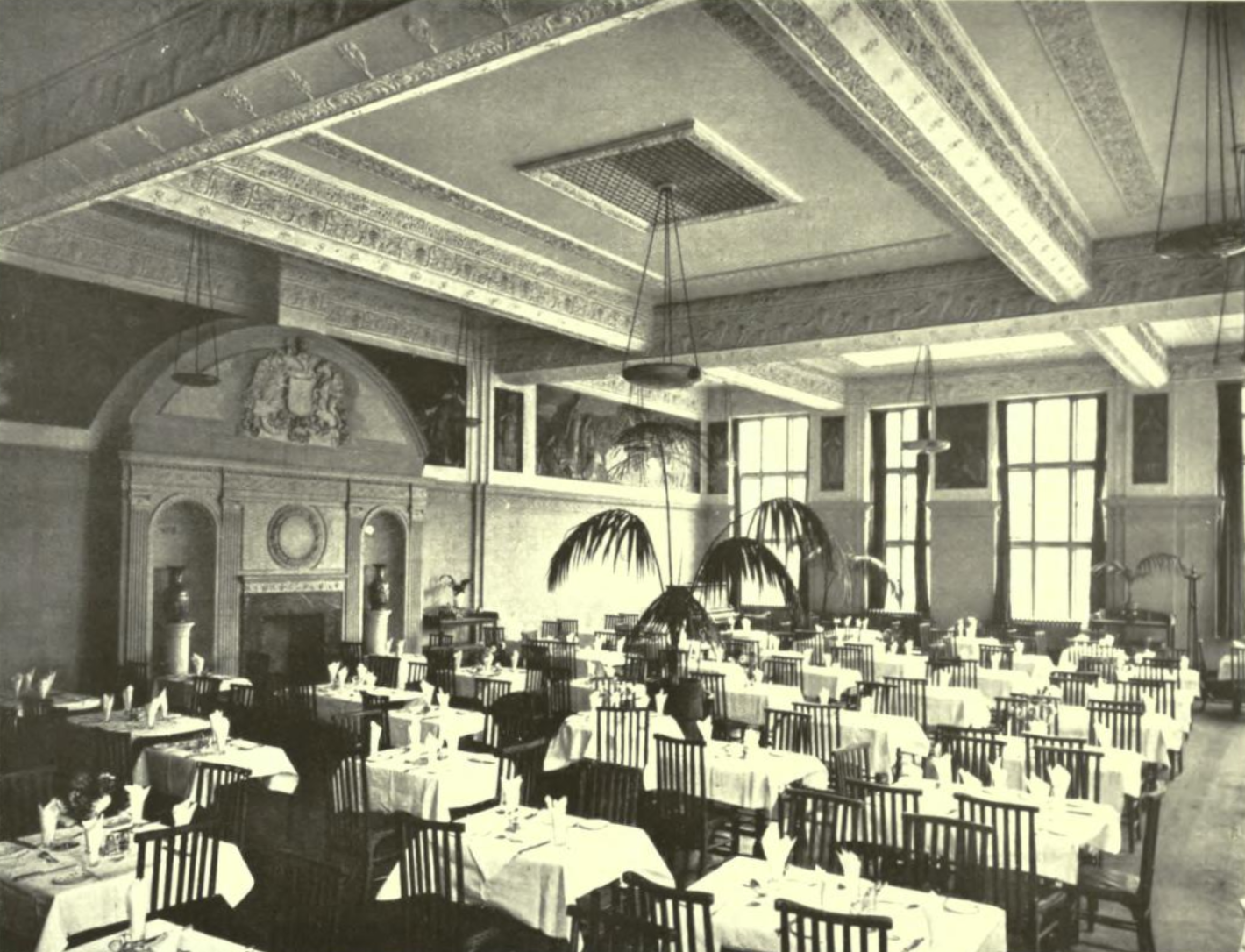
Interior of Deller's Cafe, Paignton, c.1921

Henry Hyams is described in the Survey of London as an "obscure but intriguing figure".

Hyams was a partner in the Paignton, Devon practice Hyams and Hobgen, and is noted as the architect of two restaurants in the county, the first a detached seaside café for Deller's Supply Stores in Paignton, the second a much larger multi-story design for Deller's in Exeter city centre, completed in 1916. Harold Clunn in his 1929 Famous South Coast Pleasure Resorts Past and Present described the Paignton cafe as one of the finest on the south coast. The Exeter cafe, galleried across three floors, was decorated with Arts and Crafts oak panelling and brightly coloured Art Nouveau plaster friezes. Hyams' design for the Exeter cafe was selected for the Royal Academy Summer Exhibition in 1922.

Hyams and Hobgen were also responsible for the Paignton Picture House, a 1914 construction and now the oldest surviving purpose-built cinema in Europe.

Hyams was by 1922 a fellow of the Royal Institute of British Architects and in 1927 became a member of the Institution of Structural Engineers.

Hyams is also associated with a number of buildings in Battersea, London, notably the 1924 Holgate Avenue's flats; the 1926 reconstruction of the lower hall of Battersea Town Hall; the 1924 Battersea Reference Library; and the 1925-1927 Electric House on Lavender Hill. Hyams had been appointed to a temporary post in Battersea Borough Council in 1924, which was converted to a permanent position three years later, albeit Hyams was made redundant three years after that.

Paul Cleave suggests that Hyams' work was of a high artistic quality, and reflected his personality. He had traveled in Europe in the early 20th-century, perhaps an influence on his design choices. He was an expert in Esperanto, published in that language, noted in the Encyclopedia of Esperanto as an architect and artist, and acting as president of and an instructor for a Clapham-based Esperanto society in 1920.

Hyams was a conscientious objector in World War I, facing imprisonment for his beliefs at around the time of the Exeter cafe's opening in December 1916. A founder-member of the No-Conscription Fellowship, he had received an absolute exemption from service in March 1916 from a local Military Service Tribunal, but on an appeal by the military, was later imprisoned.

In a 1921 article, Originality in Architecture Hyams argues against the teaching of old styles of architecture and the study of old architectural works, and in favour of encouraging the faculty by means of which the individual expresses himself and not another, seeing originality as "the highest mental activity of which we are capable". In particular he recommended a Guild approach to the building industries; encouragement of craftsmanship in which designers "get into close touch with his materials; and to give workmen a chance in the housing schemes of carrying out their own ideas.

== Writings ==
- Nova Sento (1915) - a philosophical romance in Esperanto by Tagulo, a pseudonym of Hyams (review)
- Originality in Architecture - The Builder, 16 September 1921, pages 346-347
- Sandals, Shoes and Boots - The Architect, 30 December 1921, pages 395-396
- Symbolic Ornament - The Builder, 11 August 1922, page 193
- The Thames at Westminster - Skylines and Silhouettes - The Architect, 10 November 1922, pages 338-339
