= Battersea Reference Library =

Public library in London

Coordinates: 51.46382°N 0.16375°W

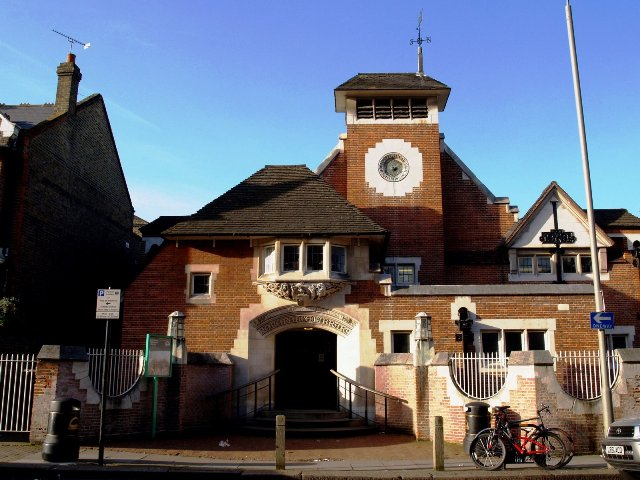
Battersea Reference Library's Altenburg Gardens entrance

Battersea Reference Library is a reference library within a Grade II listed building at Altenburg Gardens, Battersea, London, England.

The library building was designed by Henry Hyams, architectural assistant to the Battersea Council borough surveyor, in an Arts and Crafts architectural style, and was built in 1924.

The reference library is connected to, and now accessed through, Battersea Central Library; both are Wandsworth Council libraries, operated by Greenwich Leisure Ltd.

== History ==
Battersea Central Library, the main library of the settlement, was built by the Battersea Vestry between 1889 and 1890, to a design by Edward Mountford. It incorporated a 24' by 45' galleried, glass-roofed reference library room. A decision was made after World War 1, based on agitation for increased reference library space, to add a new library building adjacent and connected to the existing library, on land to the east which had been earmarked for a School of Art and was being used by the Borough's Highway and Works department. The Borough's ability to afford a new building was connected to the Public Libraries Act 1919, which repealed section 2 of the Public Libraries Act 1892 limiting library financing from rates to 1 penny in the pound per annum and which allowed more flexibility and discretion to civic authorities in respect of provision of library services. In 1918–19, for a population of 148,000, Battersea's library budget had been £3,793; this was soon doubled after the Act.

Post World War I policy prioritised housebuilding local authorities, and so the council required permission from the Board of Education to construct a new library. It argued that the studies of the growing youthful population of Battersea was hampered by existing poor housing, and thus a reference library would improve educational outcomes.

== Design ==
The Arts and Crafts design of the new building appears to have been by Harry Hyams, probably in conjunction with T. W. A. Hayward, the borough surveyor. The new building provides a 51' by 70' interior, divided into three bays by two sets of three steel columns supporting the ceiling. The roof of the central bay is a steel-arched glass roof glazed with leaded panes. An oak first-floor gallery runs around the outer walls. Both the columns and the gallery front are decorated, the former with oak-leaf and acorns and painted circular shields denoting science, art, philosophy and commerce; the latter with pierced carved diamond monograms incorporating a variety of mottos, the 1924 date, and a dove of peace (from the Borough's coat of arms).

The library was designed to provide space for 100 readers; according to an article in the South Western Star on its opening, each was provided with a "well-shaped chair ... and desks are divided into compartments which give students a measure of privacy and make them feel at home". The paper suggests the design of the library showed a clear overall concern to make the reading public feel at ease, perhaps reflecting the lowering of the age limit for entrance to the reference library, from 18 to 14.

The expectation, at the time of building, was that two additional floors would be added to the reference library when economic conditions improved, but this never came to pass. By the 1960s, when librarian Harold Smith sought to have such floors added, plans for foundations could not be found and his scheme came to nothing.

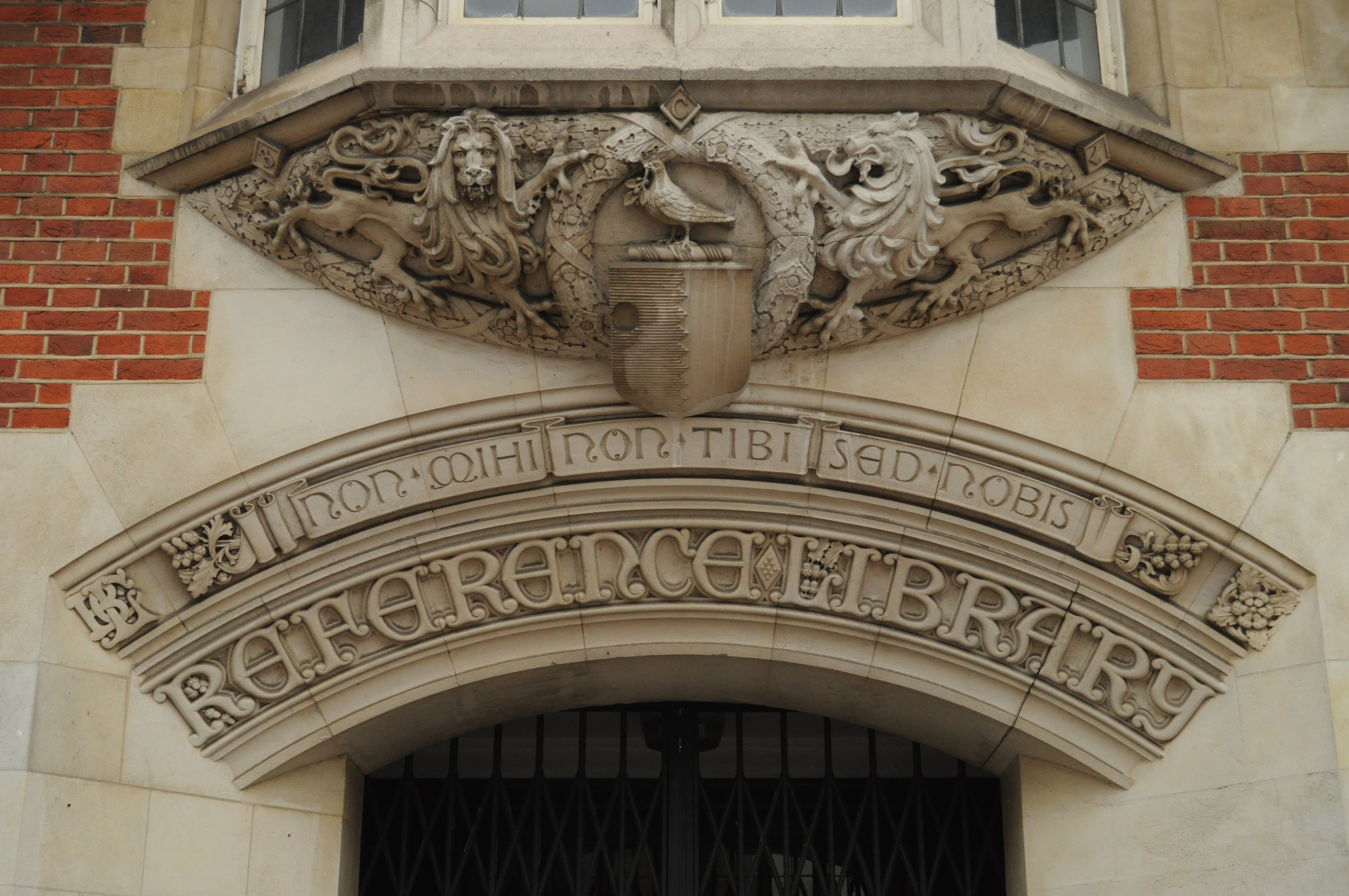
base of the oriel window, and arch of the entrance porch door

The entrance to the new reference library was from Altenburg Gardens, a side-road running south from Lavender Hill road and east of the existing library. The site was fairly congested, and the design reflects this in the choice to employ top-lighting through the roof, rather than side window lighting. The side walls of the library are plain of yellow brick. The entrance elevation of the library has a basic pyramidal shape established by its diagonal roof-lines, surmounted by a square bell turret concealing a ventilation shaft. A hipped tile roof overhangs an oriel window. The entrance porch is offset to the left, and on the right is a small gable of four mullioned windows outlined in Portland stone.

The entrance, according to Bailey, betrays little indication of the nature of the building; she cites friends guessing it might be a church, mission hall or British Legion building. Boundary railings curve inwards to the entrance porch, which is beneath an oriel window decorated with lions, acorns, swirling leaves, and the Borough coat of arms. The entrance, up a few steps, has a circular mosaic floor. Over the oak porch doors with distinctive handles, is the Battersea Council motto "Non mihi, non tibi, sed nobis", translating as "Not for me, not for you, but for all of us". Several decorative and emblematic references are found on the entrance elevation; above the hipped roof of the central turret, is a pierced copper weather vane in the form of a 'bearded professor looking man reading a book'. On the face of the turret shaft, the council's motto encircles a copper and gold lamp of knowledge. On the two piers of railings nearest entrance, two lamps of copper show gothic workings of the borough's initials, the tops pierced with fleur-de-lys. Finally the distinctive drainpipe guttering has 'reference library', 1924, flowers and basic geometrical shape motifs.

== Construction ==
The library was built in 1924 by the council's direct labour force.

== Harry Hyams ==
Identification of the architect rests on research undertaken by Pat Bailey for her 1985 Wandsworth History article on the library; architects appear to have had a relatively low status at the time of the library's construction. Hyams was acknowledged as the architect of another Borough building, Electric House, in a 1927 The Builder article, but his name does not feature on the plaque at that building's entrance, nor in the programme published to commemorate its opening.

Bailey cites the discovery that Hyams had been appointed to a temporary post in the Borough in 1924, which was converted to a permanent position three years later, albeit Hyams was made redundant three years after that. Bailey identifies illustrations in 1922 copies of The Builder showing Hyams' work on restaurants in Exeter and Paignton, which exhibit identical or similar elements to those found in the reference library, including the distinctive door handles, and fleur-de-lys decorations. Bailey concludes that Hyams, already by 1922 a fellow of the Royal Institute of British Architects and in 1927 a member of the Institution of Structural Engineers, had been taken on to work with Hayward - who was mostly associated with roads, bridges, waterworks, sewers and fireproofing - to deliver the steel-framed and highly decorated library building.
