= David Jubb =

- Born: 1969 (age 56–57)
- Education: Bedford Modern School
- Alma mater: Bretton Hall College; University of Bristol; Central School of Speech and Drama
- Occupation: Theatre producer
- Known for: Artistic Director & CEO of Battersea Arts Centre; Chairman of the board of trustees of Kneehigh Theatre

David Jubb (born 1969) is a theatre producer and the current artistic director and CEO of Battersea Arts Centre. He has been BAC's Artistic Director since 2004, sharing the Joint Artistic Directorship with David Micklem from 2008 to 2012, and CEO since 2008. He also worked as a Development Producer at Battersea Arts Centre (1999-2001), working with Artistic Director Tom Morris to develop Scratch and BAC's Ladder of Development.

== Life ==
Jubb was born in 1969. He was educated at Bedford Modern School, Bretton Hall College, the University of Bristol and the Central School of Speech and Drama.

Jubb's work at Battersea Arts Centre has included the organisation's celebration of UK-wide theatre, A Nation's Theatre, and the management of the building in the wake of the fire which occurred in its Grand Hall in March 2015.

Jubb was Director of Your Imagination (2001-2004), a company dedicated to producing independent artists, including Ridiculusmus, Kazuko Hohki and Toby Jones, and Director of The Lion & Unicorn Theatre for Central School of Speech and Drama (1998-1999). He has been BAC's Artistic Director since 2004, sharing the Joint Artistic Directorship with David Micklem from 2008 to 2012, and CEO since 2008. He also worked as a Development Producer at Battersea Arts Centre (1999-2001), working with Artistic Director Tom Morris to develop Scratch and BAC's Ladder of Development.

Jubb was chairman of the board of trustees of Kneehigh Theatre from 2008 to 2013, and Chair of the London Theatre Consortium from 2011 to 2015.
