= Battersea Central Library =

Public library in London

Coordinates: 51.46401°N 0.16420°W

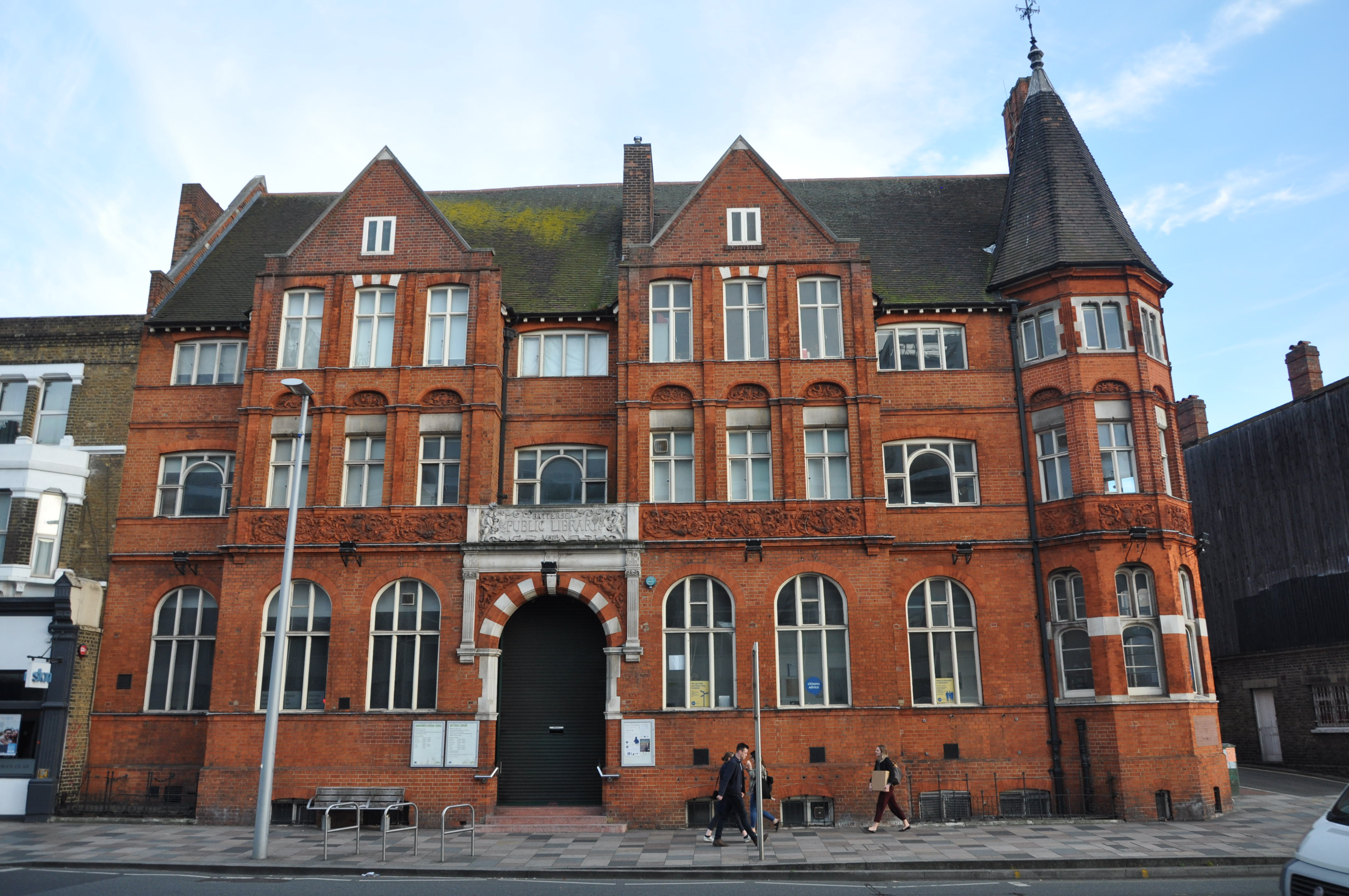
Battersea Central Library

December 1888 sketch of the proposed library; when built, the octagonal turret was extended to the second story.

Battersea Central Library - ground-floor plan in 1888

Battersea Central Library - first-floor plan in 1888

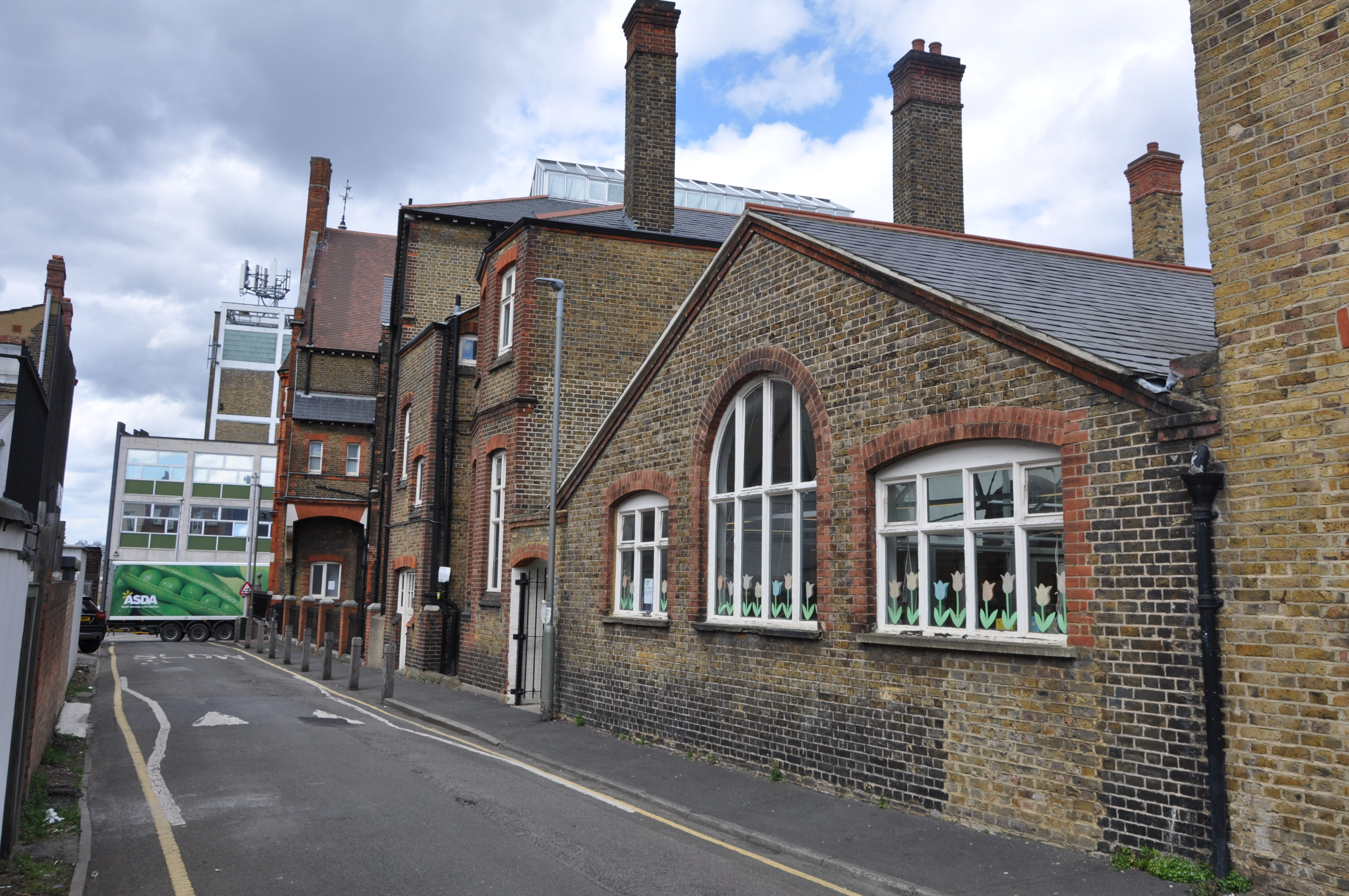
Battersea Central Library extension

Battersea Central Library is a public lending library situated on Lavender Hill in Battersea, south-west London. The library was built by the Battersea Vestry between 1889 and 1890, to a design by Edward Mountford, and remains in use in contemporary times as one of Wandsworth Council's libraries, operated by Greenwich Leisure Ltd.

A separate Battersea Reference Library, built in 1924 with a frontage on Altenburg Gardens, is connected to the Central Library, and together the pair are known as Battersea Library.

== History ==
Municipal boroughs in England and Wales were first given the power to establish free libraries by the Public Libraries Act 1850. Battersea, which in 1850 had a population of some 12,000 and local government based on the Vestry system, became eligible to consider adoption of the provisions of the Act after the Public Library Acts 1855 extended the types of authorities that qualified as potential Library Authorities. The Battersea Vestry considered the matter in a meeting in 1859, but declined to engage. By that date, much of the administration of local government in Battersea had been transferred to the Wandsworth Board of Works by dint of the Metropolis Management Act 1855.

Battersea experienced very rapid population growth over the next two decades; by 1881 it numbered 107,000 inhabitants, and as a result, both overshadowed the much smaller Wandsworth, and had ambitions to regain its autonomy. In 1887 the Wandsworth Board adopted the Libraries act and began making plans for library provision; it established temporary library facilities at two locations (on Battersea Park Road, and on the Latchmere Estate) and engaged Laurence Inkster, who had experience as the borough librarian of South Shields.

However, in the same year, the Metropolis Management (Battersea and Westminster) Act 1887 enabled Battersea to escape the Wandsworth Board and regain full control of all parochial functions. The revivified Battersea Vestry of 1888 was consciously progressive in nature, in part because of its newly won autonomy; in part because of the make-up of its population, and in part because of the ideals of some of its leaders, such as John Buckmaster, John Burns and Andrew Cameron.

Battersea Central Library was one of its first major projects. In 1888 the Vestry purchased what had been part of the West Lodge estate for £3,000: an L-shaped site with frontages onto Lavender Hill and Altenburg Gardens, to the west and south of Altenburg Terrace. It immediately held a design competition to solicit plans for a building based on very detailed specifications of requirements; ten architects submitted entries, and that of Edward Mountford was selected. Mountford was local and presumably well known to the Vestry; he was at the time engaged in the design and construction of the nearby Northcote Road Baptist Church (and three years later would be selected as architect for the new Battersea Town Hall). The Central Library was his first commission from the Vestry; his winning submission was the only design of the ten that could be built within the Vestry's £6,000 budget.

Mountford's design is of three-stories (plus basement), in red brick by Richardson & Co of Brunswick Wharf, Vauxhall, with Portland stone dressings and a roof of Broseley slate to match the extant 'speculating builder' constructions which characterise the area - many of which owe their origins to the work of Alfred Heaver, the dominant property developer of what is now termed Clapham Junction. The front elevation of the building has five main bays, the second and fourth of which project slightly and are topped by shaped gables. A sixth bay in the form of an octagonal tourelle with a steep roof forms the right-side corner of the building. This feature was added to Mountford's winning design after its submission and before building commenced; originally projected as a two-story turret, it was built to three-stories height. One effect of the turret is to set the library's entrance off-centre. The building is minimally embellished, having only carved-brick garlands and putti above the ground-floor windows of the projecting bays, probably by Gilbert Seale of Camberwell; and decoration around the arched entrance with a frieze above. Andrew Saint, in Survey of London, Battersea, describes the building as being in the "mildly Flemish Renaissance style, in the spirit of Ernest George".

As initially constructed, on the ground floor, a central lobby and corridor led to a news room on the right, behind which was the librarian's office; and a magazine room on the left. The lending library shelving occupied the rear of the ground floor. On the first floor, accessed by a central staircase, a double-height galleried reference library with open-timbered ceiling occupied the rear of the building; a second magazine room was situated to the front-left, and on the right side a small (and poorly lit) Ladies Reading Room separated the reference library from the librarian's apartment. On the second-floor a book store was situated above the magazine room, with the right-side of the building housing the upper floor of the librarian's apartment. The basement provided accommodation for a caretaker, and the library frontage was set behind a low stone wall with wrought-iron railings and six stone piers supporting spherical finials. Shelving throughout the library was of pitch pine.

The building was constructed by building contractor James Holloway, who tendered £5,600 for the job. A foundation stone was laid on 2 May 1889 by John Lubbock, 1st Baron Avebury, and work proceeded quickly, albeit Holloway died in 1889 before completion, and his executors arranged for his brothers' construction company, Holloway Brothers (London), to complete the project. The library was opened by Sheffield Liberal MP A. J. Mundella on 26 March 1890.

A number of modifications to the design were made in the very early years of the life of the building; as with alterations to Battersea Town Hall after its 1893 construction, all of these were designed by J. T. Pilditch, the vestry's surveyor with work being undertaken by the vestry's direct labour force rather than by contractors. The need to widen Lavender Hill road in 1895–96 necessitated removal of the railings and infilling of the light-wells illuminating the basement; this rendered the basement uninhabitable, as a result of which an extension was built to the rear of the library in 1897–98 to provide additional lending library space above which a new apartment for the caretaker was constructed. The second-floor book store had been repurposed as a lecture room in the very earliest period of the building's use, but in 1900–1 the first floor magazine room was galleried by removing the lecture room floor, the ground floor magazine room was turned into an auxiliary news room, and the second floor was extended to provide a children's library.
