= Metropolitan Borough of Battersea =

Former British administrative division

Coordinates: 51.4648°N 0.1607°W

Battersea St Mary Battersea
- Civil parish and metropolitan borough
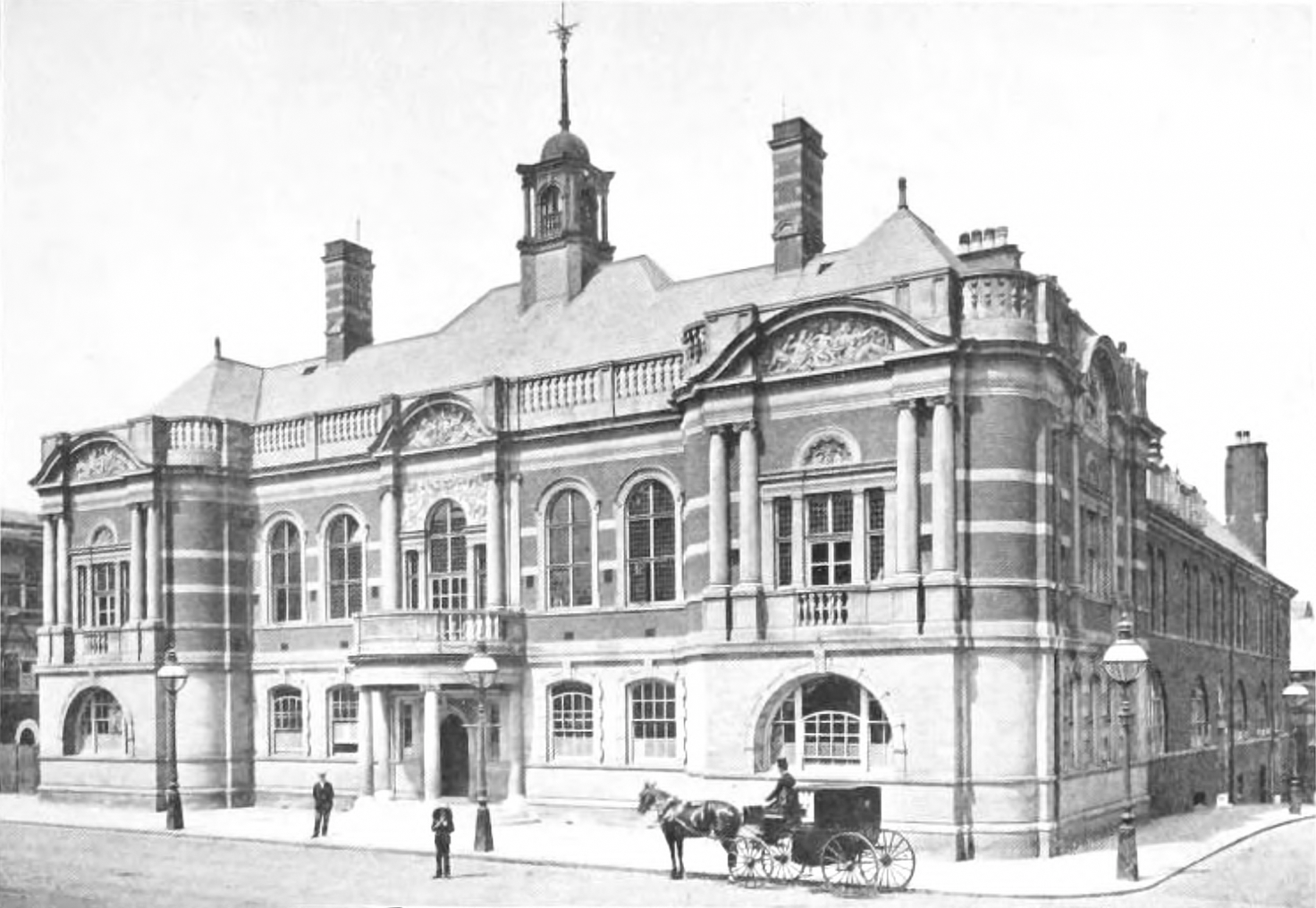
- New Parochial Offices, built for Battersea Vestry, became Battersea Town Hall for Battersea Borough Council

- Borough of Battersea within the County of London
- Interactive map of the borough
- Area
  - 1831: 3,020 acres (12.2 km^{2})
  - 1851: 2,343 acres (9.48 km^{2})
  - 1901: 2,161 acres (8.75 km^{2})
- Population
  - 1801: 3,365
  - 1851: 10,560
  - 1901: 168,907
- Density
  - 1851: 4.5/acre
  - 1901: 78/acre
- History
  - Origin: Ancient parish
  - Abolished: 1965
  - Succeeded by: London Borough of Wandsworth
- Status: Civil parish (until 1965); Metropolitan borough (1900-1965)
- Government: Battersea Vestry (1888–1900); Battersea Borough Council (1900–1965)
  - HQ: Town Hall, Lavender Hill
  - Motto: Non Mihi Non Tibi Sed Nobis; (Not for me, not for thee, but for us)
- Coat of arms of the borough council
- Today part of: London Borough of Wandsworth

Battersea was a civil parish and metropolitan borough in the County of London, England. In 1965, the borough was abolished and its area combined with parts of the Metropolitan Borough of Wandsworth to form the London Borough of Wandsworth. The borough was administered from Battersea Town Hall on Lavender Hill. That building is now Battersea Arts Centre. The local authority was Battersea Vestry until 1900 and then Battersea Borough Council until 1965.

== History ==
As an ancient parish, Battersea was part of the hundred of Brixton and county of Surrey. It included the exclave of Penge. In 1855, under the Metropolis Management Act 1855, the civil responsibilities of the parish were passed to the Metropolitan Board of Works. The two parts of the parish were assigned to different districts by the act establishing the MBW: Battersea was included in the area of the Wandsworth District Board of Works and the hamlet of Penge in that of Lewisham District Board of Works. Penge became a civil parish in its own right in 1866.

On 25 March 1888, an administrtive vestry was formed as a local authority for 'The parish of Saint Mary Battersea excluding Penge'. In 1889, the Local Government Act 1888 reconstituted the area of the Metropolitan Board of Works as the County of London, and Battersea was transferred from Surrey to the new county. In 1900, the London Government Act 1899 divided the County of London into twenty-eight metropolitan boroughs. The vestries and district boards were dissolved. The parish became the Metropolitan Borough of Battersea, with the borough council replacing the civil vestry.

== Geography ==
The Metropolitan Borough included within its bounds Battersea, Battersea Park, Clapham Junction and parts of Wandsworth Common and Clapham Common. The area of the borough was 2,163 acres (8.8 km^{2}).

== Governance ==
=== Battersea Vestry ===
The population of the parish in 1896 was 165,115 and it had adopted the Public Libraries Act 1850 immediately upon obtaining local independence in 1888, with its own vestry. For electoral purposes, the parish was divided into four wards and had 120 elected vestrymen.

=== Battersea Borough Council ===
The first election to the council was on 1 November 1900, with the Progressive Party taking control of the new borough. They retained power until 1909, when the Municipal Reform Party (allied to the Conservatives) gained a majority. The Progressives regained the council in 1912, holding power until 1919 when the Labour Party gained control. In 1931 the borough come under Municipal Reform control again. Labour regained power in 1934, retaining it for the rest of the borough's existence.

In 1913, John Archer became mayor of the borough and the first black mayor in the capital.

Elections of the whole council were held every three years. Elections were cancelled during the two world wars (1914–1918 and 1939–1945). The 1952 election was postponed for a year so that it did not clash with elections to the London County Council. The number of councillors returned at each election was as follows:.

Local elections

Year	1900	1903	1906	1909	1912	1919	1922
Progressives	37	38	29	2	29		
Municipal Alliance	17	16	25				
Municipal Reform				52	25	11	21
Labour						41	33
Discharged servicemen						2	

Year	1925	1928	1931	1934	1937	1945
Progressives						
Municipal Alliance						
Municipal Reform	25	22	31	18	15	5
Labour	29	33	23	37	40	50

No Municipal Reform candidates were nominated after 1946, and Conservative candidates were nominated at local elections for the first time.

Year	1949	1953	1956	1959	1962
Labour	34	37	46	34	40
Conservative	21	18	18	21	12
Liberal					3

==== Coat of arms ====
In 1901, the borough adopted an unofficial coat of arms, consisting of a shield vertically divided blue and white, the division line being indented (in heraldry-speak Party per pale indented azure and argent). This design was taken from a flag dating from 1803. On top of the shield was a dove bearing an olive branch. The Latin motto was Non Mihi, Non Tibi, Sed Nobis, or "Neither for myself, nor for yourself, but for us".

In 1955, the borough received an official grant from the College of Arms, based on the old device. The colours in the shield were reversed, and a bordure or heraldic border added. The bordure consisted of silver and blue waves, representative of the River Thames, and bore sixteen gold stars for the sixteen wards of the borough. The new crest on top of the helm was the dove of the 1901 design, with the addition of sprigs of lavender, for the old lavender fields of the area, and Lavender Hill, the main road of Battersea. The old motto was retained.

==== Wards ====
A map showing the wards of Battersea Metropolitan Borough as they appeared in 1916.

From 1900 to 1949 the borough was divided into nine wards, returning either three, six or nine councillors:

- Bolingbroke (6 councillors)
- Broomwood (6)
- Church (6)
- Latchmere (6)
- Nine Elms (9)
- Park (6)
- St John (3)
- Shaftesbury (6)
- Winstanley (6)

In 1949 the wards were redrawn, with fourteen wards returning three to five councillors each:

- Bolingbroke (3)
- Broomwood (3)
- Church (4)
- Latchmere (4)
- Lavender (3)
- Newtown (3)
- Nightingale (5)
- Nine Elms (3)
- Park (4)
- Queenstown (4)
- St John (4)
- Shaftesbury (3)
- Stormont (3)
- Thornton (3)
- Vicarage (3)
- Winstanley (3)

== Population ==
The population recorded in the Census was:

Battersea Vestry 1801–1899

Year	1801	1811	1821	1831	1841	1851	1861	1871	1881	1891
Population	3,365	4,409	4,764	5,311	6,617	10,560	19,600	54,016	107,262	150,558

Metropolitan Borough 1900–1961

Year	1901	1911	1921	1931	1941	1951	1961
Population	168,907	167,743	167,739	159,552		117,140	105,870

== Parliamentary representation ==
For elections to parliament the borough was originally part of the parliamentary borough of Battersea and Clapham, which consisted of two divisions, Battersea and Clapham.

In 1918 the metropolitan borough was divided into two constituencies:

- Battersea North (Church, Latchmere, Nine Elms and Park wards) and
- Battersea South (Bolingbroke, Broomwood, St John, Shaftesbury and Winstanley wards)

The boundaries of the two constituencies were adjusted in 1949 to reflect the redrawn borough wards:

- Battersea North (Church, Latchmere, Newtown, Nine Elms, Park, Queenstown, Vicarage and Winstanley wards)
- Battersea South (Bolingbroke, Broomwood, Lavender, Nightingale, St John, Shaftesbury, Stormont and Thornton wards)

The constituencies continued unchanged until 1983 when the Battersea constituency largely succeeded these two.

== Ecclesiastical parish ==
The ancient parish, dedicated to St Mary, was in the Diocese of Winchester until 1877, then the Diocese of Rochester until 1905, and then finally in the Diocese of Southwark. From 1851, as the population of Battersea increased, a number of new parishes were formed:

- St George, Nine Elms in 1853
- Christ Church, Battersea Park in 1861
- St John, York Road Battersea in 1863
- St Philip, Queen's Road, Battersea in 1870
- Church of the Ascension, Lavender Hill in 1871
- St Saviour, Battersea Park Road in 1872
- St Peter, Plough Road, Battersea in 1876
- St Mark, Battersea Rise in 1883
- All Saints, Queen's Road, Battersea Park in 1884
- St Michael, Wandsworth Common in 1884
- St Andrew, Stockdale Road, Battersea in 1886
- St Stephen, Battersea Bridge Road in 1887
- St Barnabas, Clapham Common in 1895
- St Luke, Ramsden Road, Battersea in 1901
- St Bartholomew, Wickersley Road, Battersea in 1906

A number of new parishes were also formed within the detached part of Battersea parish, the hamlet of Penge:

- St John the Evangelist, Penge in 1851
- St Paul, Penge in 1869
- Holy Trinity, Anerley Road, Penge in 1873
- Christ Church, Penge in 1886

== Replacement ==
During the restructuring and redefinition of the metropolitan boroughs in 1965 done by Keith Joseph, the Metropolitan Borough of Battersea merged with the Metropolitan Borough of Wandsworth to create the London Borough of Wandsworth.
