= Battersea Town Hall =

Municipal building in London, England

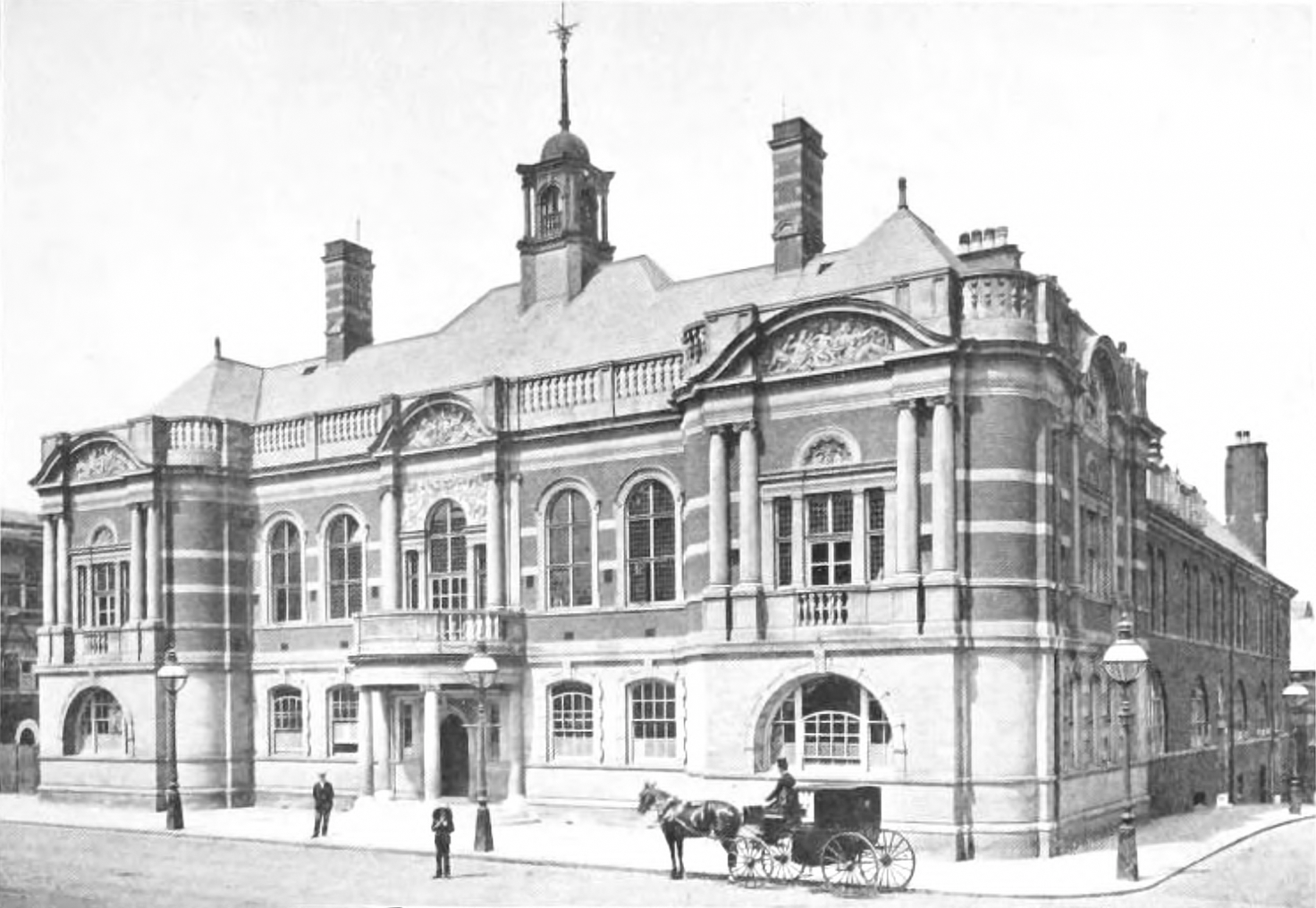
- Battersea Town Hall c. 1893
- Interactive map of the Battersea Town Hall area
- Former names: New Parochial Offices, Battersea
- Alternative names: Battersea Arts Centre

General information
- Type: Municipal building
- Architectural style: Edwardian Baroque
- Location: Lavender Hill, Battersea, London, United Kingdom
- Coordinates: 51°27′54″N 0°09′39″W
- Current tenants: Battersea Arts Centre
- Construction started: 1891
- Completed: 1893
- Cost: GBP 25,750
- Client: Battersea Vestry
- Owner: Wandsworth Council

Technical details
- Material: Monks Park (Bath) stone and red Suffolk bricks
- Floor count: 3

Design and construction
- Architect: Edward Mountford
- Main contractor: Walter Willis of Balham

Battersea Town Hall, originally the New Parochial Offices, Battersea, is a Grade II* listed municipal building in Battersea, south London, designed by Edward Mountford and erected between 1891 and 1893 by the Battersea vestry to provide public halls and office space for its staff. The building served for 72 years as the hub of municipal Battersea until the centre of local government was moved to neighbouring Wandsworth in 1965, after which it transitioned to use as a community and arts centre, latterly known as the Battersea Arts Centre.

== History ==
=== Background ===
A requirement for a town hall arose in Battersea in 1888, when the Battersea vestry regained autonomy from the Wandsworth District Board of Works under the Metropolis Management (Battersea and Westminster) Act 1887. The Wandsworth board had assumed powers of local government of Battersea in 1855 from the Battersea vestry, but prodigious population growth in Battersea over the subsequent 30-years provided a rationale for the reversion to vestry control. The Wandsworth board had since 1858 operated locally from a relatively small Georgian property, Mellish House, at 68A Battersea Rise. The vestry deemed this site too small to house its then 120 staff; it aspired to a building providing halls capable of seating 1,500 and 300 people, as well as a boardroom for the vestry board and offices for churchwardens, overseers and staff.

Population of Battersea
Date	Population
1801	3,365
1851	10,560
1881	107,262
1891	150,558

Battersea's ambitions were an expression of the civic pride of newly autonomous urban and provincial governing bodies, which looked, for models, back to 15th-century Italian city republics and the Hanseatic League, and which vied to create increasingly splendid symbols of their power and importance in brick and stone. Town halls were, too, a manifestation of rivalry between authorities: "Birmingham Town Hall trumped by Liverpool St. George’s Hall, whose glory was stolen by Bradford St. George’s Hall, which was in turn trumped by Leeds Town Hall". By these yardsticks, Battersea's town hall - at the time known as the New Parochial Offices, Battersea - was to be a more modest affair, rejecting mock Gothic and Italianate styling in favour of an English Neo-Renaissance aesthetic blended with Arts and Crafts and vernacular elements. In part, this modesty reflected the smaller size of the London authorities, relative to the great provincial cites. Equally, at least amongst London town halls, Battersea Town Hall is cited as one of the most accomplished examples of a trend away from parsimony characterised by modest structures with minimal decoration, towards appreciable municipal architecture.

=== Development ===
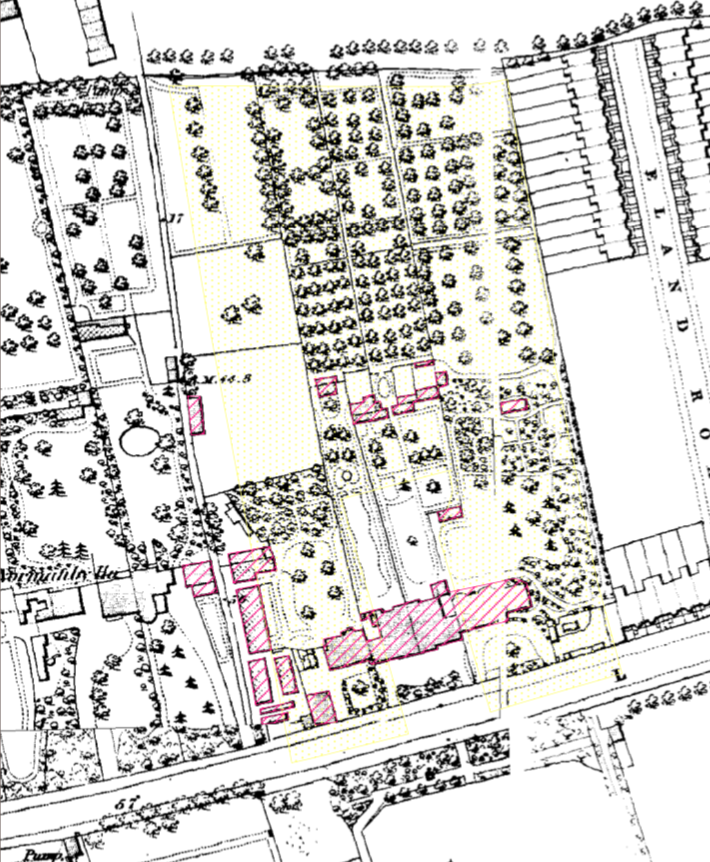
OS map of Lavender Hill c.1869. Elm House and grounds, the site of the Town Hall, is the rightmost yellow-shaded area

Although initial consideration was given to the proposed hall in 1888, it was not until 1891 that the vestry decided to act on their ambitions and to allocate a budget of £42,000 to the project. Eight sites were considered, all south of the main east-west railway lines that divide the parish. The vestry decided upon the purchase of Elm House, a villa with a small wooded estate on Lavender Hill, previously the home of Jane Senior, and which was close to their Lavender Hill Library building, as the site for the new hall.

A competition was held to solicit designs for the proposed hall, to a brief drawn up by J. T. Pilditch, the vestry's surveyor, and with William Young, architect of the Glasgow City Chambers resident at nearby Putney, acting as judge. Young awarded the design project to Edward Mountford, who lived locally and was already well known to the vestry as architect of the 1889 ‘Early French Renaissance’ style Lavender Hill Library, and of Battersea Polytechnic. His credentials were good; he had also succeeded in a similar competition to design the much grander Sheffield Town Hall. Equally, as the Oxford Dictionary of National Biography puts it, Mountford's lack of connections meant that in the early years of his practise he had ample time to dedicate to design competitions. The vestry committed an initial £25,000 to the cost of the proposed 52,000 square feet (4,800 m^{2}) structure.

Work commenced in the winter of 1891-2, the vestry using direct labour - its own workforce; a recurrent feature of Battersea's approach to the provision of infrastructure - to clear the site, lay roads, drains and sewerage. However the construction was let by tender to the firm of Walter Willis of Balham, which quoted £25,750 for the job. Two foundation stones date the main construction phase to a 7 November 1892 start, and the building was opened - if not entirely completed - by the same time in 1893, by Lord Rosebery, Chairman of the London County Council.

== Description ==
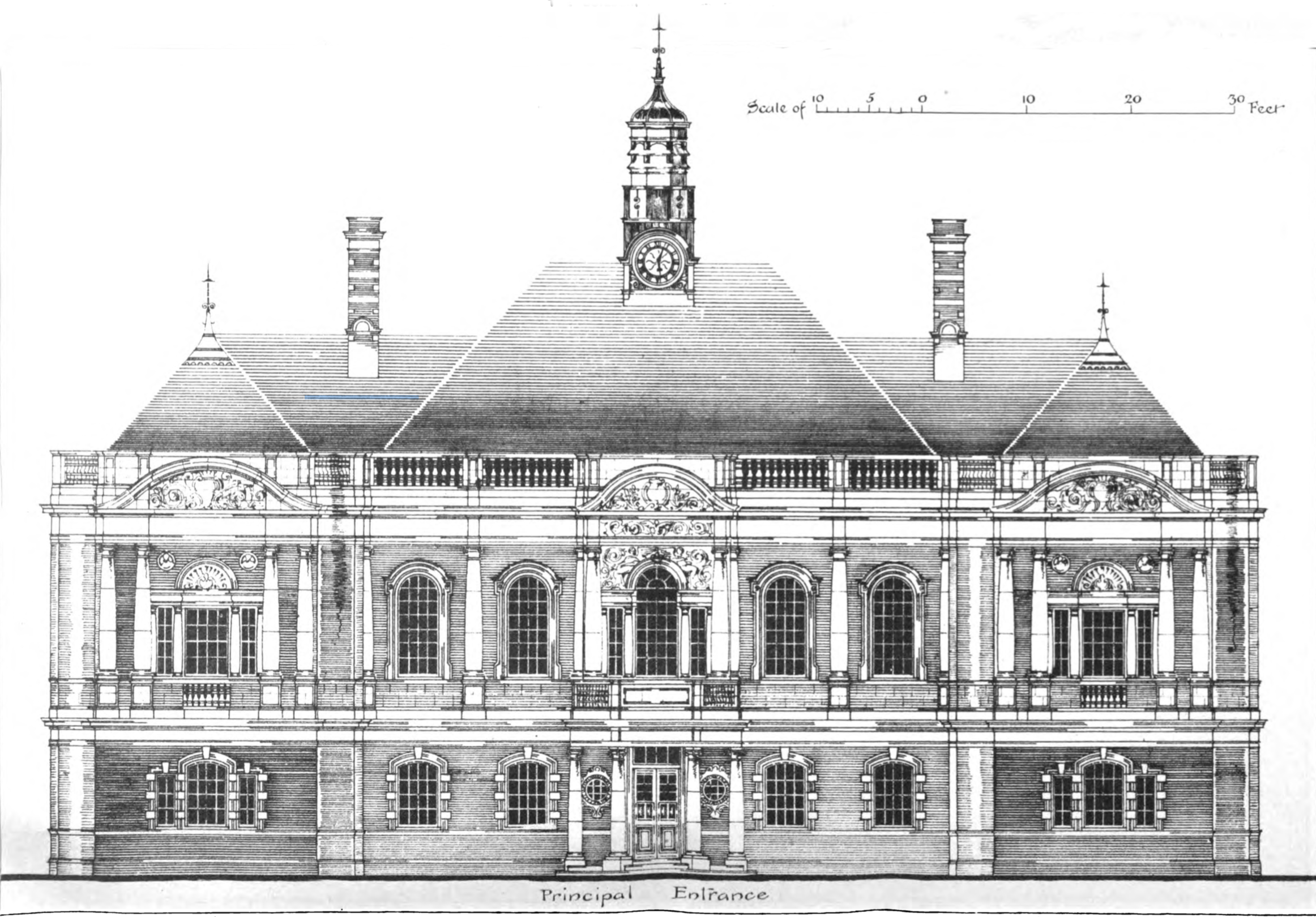
New Parochial Offices, Battersea - illustration from The Builder, 1891

Eastern side-elevation of the town hall

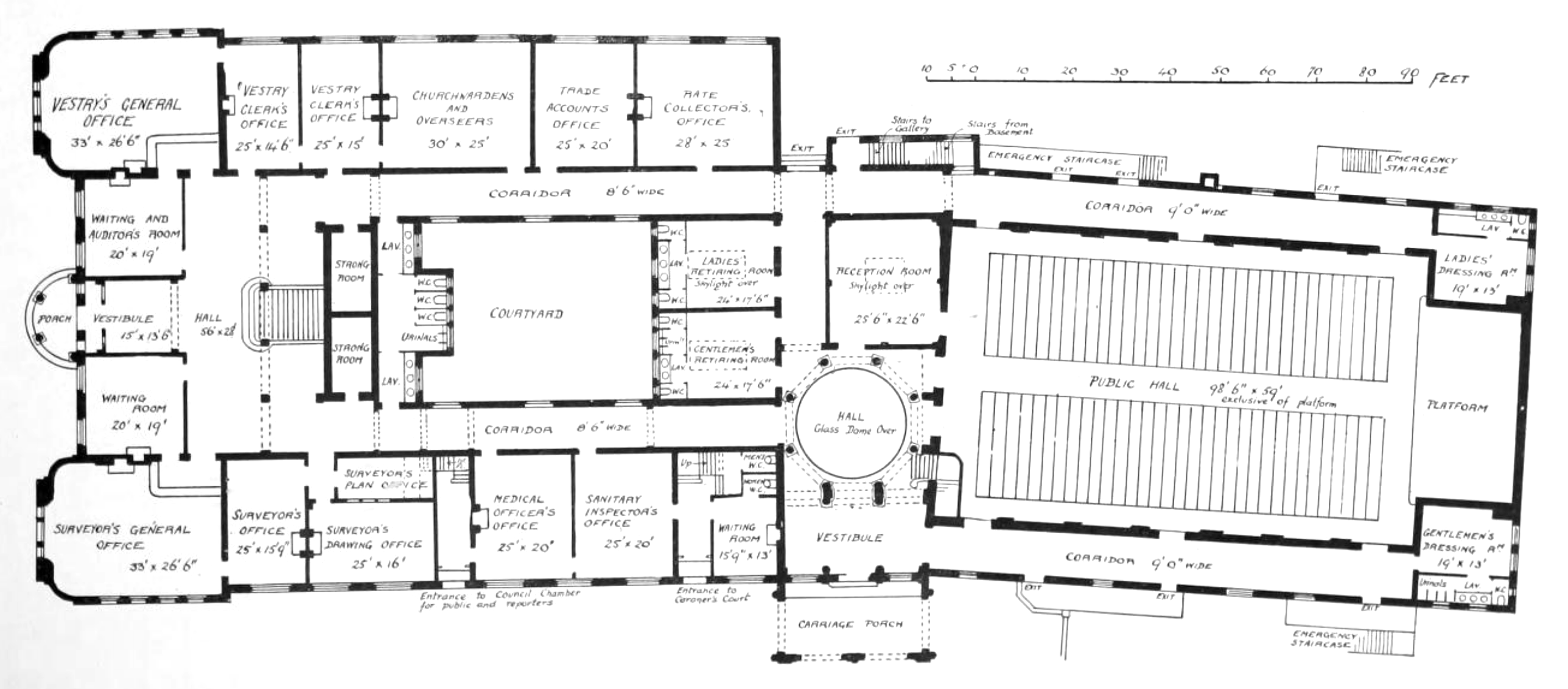
Plan of the ground floor of the town hall

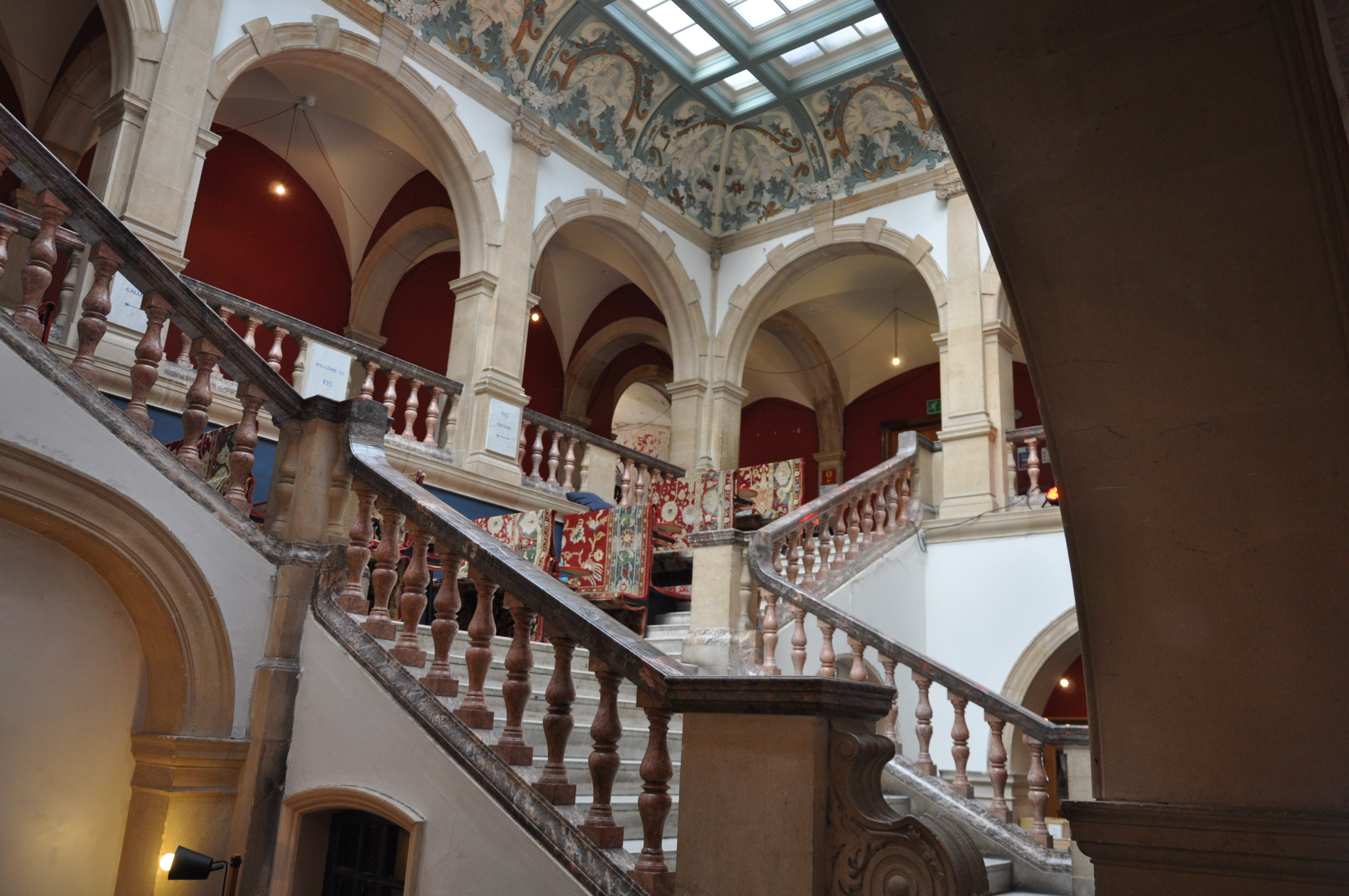
Imperial staircase within Battersea Town Hall

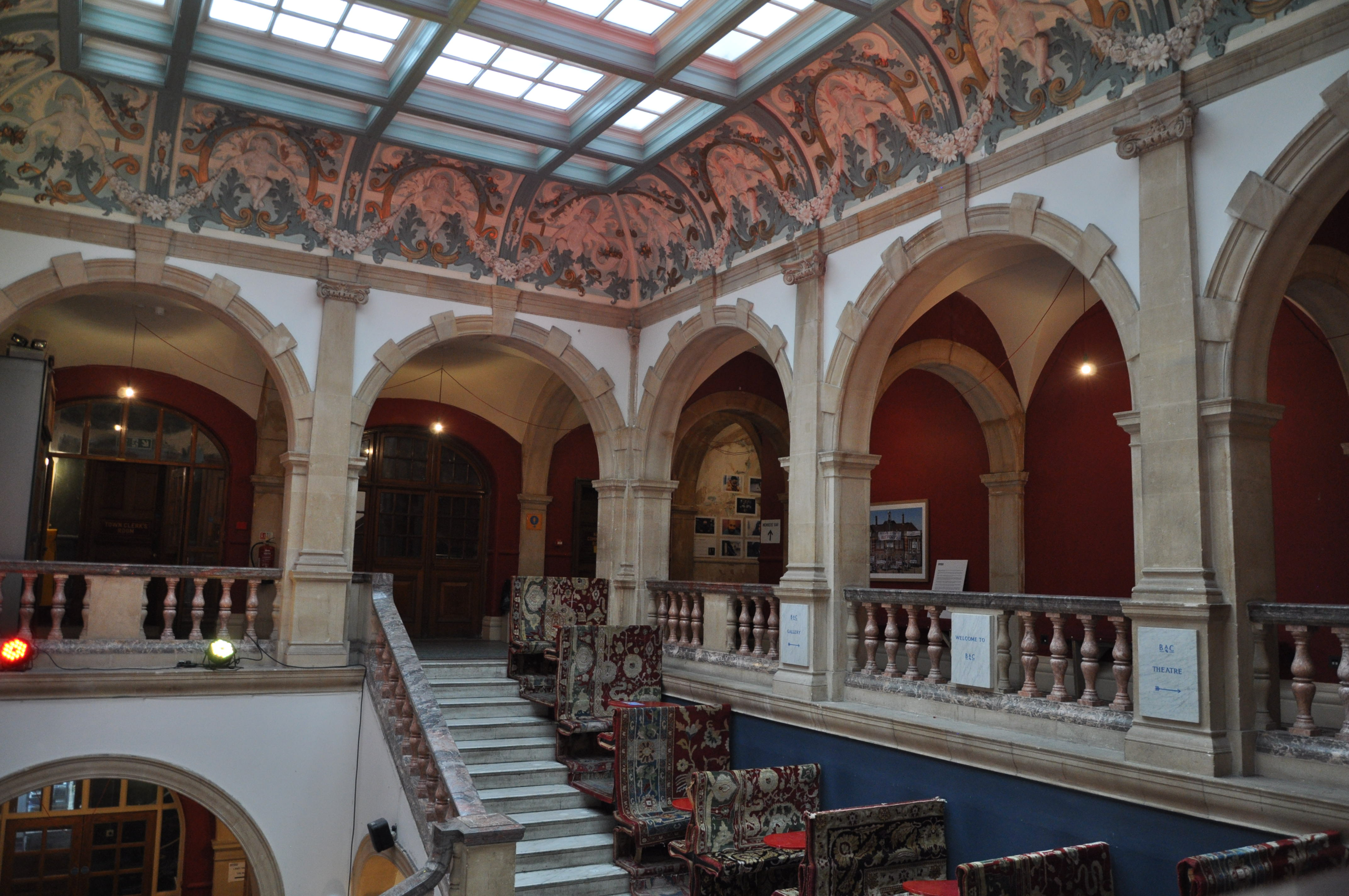
Staircase and first floor corridors within Battersea Town Hall

The town hall is built on a sloping site falling northwards from a 160 foot (49 m) frontage on Lavender Hill. The building extends 293 feet (89 m) northwards, divided into two essential parts; a front 2-storey municipal building with council chamber and offices; and at the rear a series of public halls. The building is offset to the west of the site, Mountford electing to build a 40 feet (12 m) wide road to the east of the building to provide easy access to the public halls.

In a communication to The Builder, Mountford described the design intention as "essentially English Renaissance, though perhaps treated somewhat freely", and set out a series of principles for the building:

- The good approaches to all parts of the building, especially the public hall
- The corridors are wide and well lighted from the central court, while the principle staircase and entrance are lighted from above
- The compactness and convenient arrangement of offices for various parish purposes
- The prominent position assigned to the council chamber and the accompanying committee rooms and member's library
- The means of completely disconnecting the public hall and its accessories from the other parts of the building, when let out for bazaars and other purposes
- The thoroughly well lighting of every part of the building.

To the functional layout of the building, Mountford introduced what were for him was a signature feature: the blending of the architectural with sculpture and painting. Woodwork panelling, floors and dado rails are of oak; highly decorative ceilings and friezes in the council chamber and the grand hall of fibrous plaster were provided by Gilbert Seale of Camberwell. Floors feature mosaics with emblematic bees, signifiers of the industry of the parish, by Rust's Vitreous Mosaic Company of Battersea. Relief sculptures by Horace and Paul Raphael Montford adorn pediments at the front and side of the building; to the east, Labour and Progress; to the west, Art and Literature, and in the centre, Justice and Prudence flank the crest and arms of the Parish, and Authority and Relaxation (alternatively called Government and Entertainment) feature to either side of the first-floor central window, personifications of the twin purposes of the building. Putti (cherubs) feature on the main entrance spandrels and the lunettes of windows and doors. An elaborate curved frieze featuring cartouches, swags and more putti adorn the staircases - themselves in Devonshire and Sicilian marble. The glass dome above the octagonal hall features a garden-pattern in shades of yellow.

Mountford's design provided a symmetrical 112 feet (34 m) building frontage in Monks Park (Bath) stone and red Suffolk bricks, having 5 central bays including a semi-circular Ionic portico, and single bay pavilions with curved-corners to left and right. At the front, upper windows are in a Venetian style, whilst the lower windows have rusticated or Gibbs surrounds. The building has hipped roofs, originally of Westmoreland slate, incorporating turrets of oak covered with copper and surmounted by wrought iron.

Within the ceremonial front block of the hall, an imperial staircase rises to a gallery on three sides; the council chambers and a public viewing area, a committee room and members' library occupy the front of the first-floor space, and a series of offices are provided along the east and west of the ground-floor of the block. A small courtyard serves as a light-well.

To the rear of the main block, proceeding down the hill, are three halls: the main Grand Hall, beneath which is a smaller Lower Hall, with a glass-domed Octagonal Hall linking these to the front municipal block. The Grand Hall is a 4,000 cubic metres (140,000 cu ft) space with an arched ceiling rising to 10.5 meters (34 ft) height, adorned with decorative plasterwork and ventilation grilles. At the northern end, a platform stage is fronted by a highly decorated proscenium. Wide corridors run along the east and west of the hall, above which are large arched windows providing the hall with ample daylight.

=== Further development ===
Embellishment of the buildings continued after their opening; the building was closed for three months in 1897 to enable plasterwork to be painted and gilded, and before that in 1894 full-sized plaster maquettes of three of William Calder Marshall's sculptures were installed: Dancing Girl Reposing, Zephyr and Aurora, and Eurydice - the last since lost (by Wandsworth council, upon its transfer to their town hall). In 1895 a glass and iron porch was built to provide shelter outside the Grand Hall entrance.

Perhaps the single feature neglected by the vestry during the original construction was the installation of an electric lighting system; in 1896-7 a 100 V system was retrofitted, served by a dedicated generator, and in 1901-2 a higher voltage system served by the borough's Lombard Road power station was introduced.

Additions were made at the time of incorporation of Battersea as one of London's metropolitan boroughs in 1900, in the form of an additional refreshment room catering for up to 400 people, as well as additional office space; provision for these had been made in the original plans, although practical difficulties necessitated compromises in providing adequate access to the new rooms. J. T. Pilditch served as architect for these modifications.

In 1901 a large pipe organ was installed in the Grand Hall by Norman and Beard, under the direction of Hugh Blair, the borough's Director of Music. This was an unusual instrument thought to be designed by Robert Hope-Jones, a pioneering organ builder who invented many aspects of the modern pipe organ, and whose ideas went on to form the basis of the Wurlitzer theatre organ in the 1920s and 30s. The console was situated at the front of the Grand Hall's stage, on rails allowing it to be hidden when not in use; organ pipes were arranged in five oak cases manufactured by borough carpenters.

In 1920, a permanent projection booth was installed in the Grand Hall gallery, to replace portable cinematic equipment which had been employed since 1899.

== Repurposing as Battersea Arts Centre ==
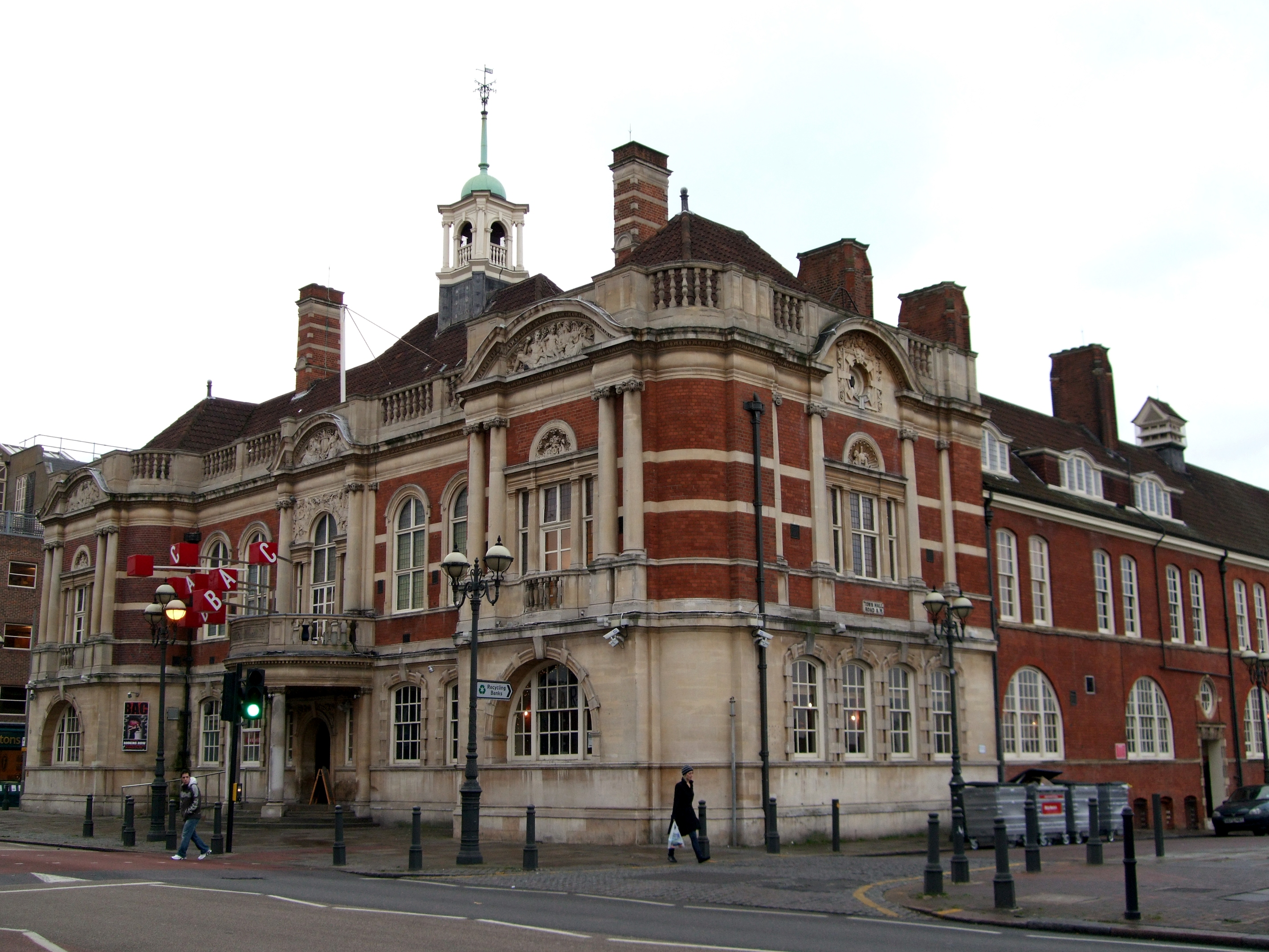
Battersea Town Hall under Battersea Arts Centre management

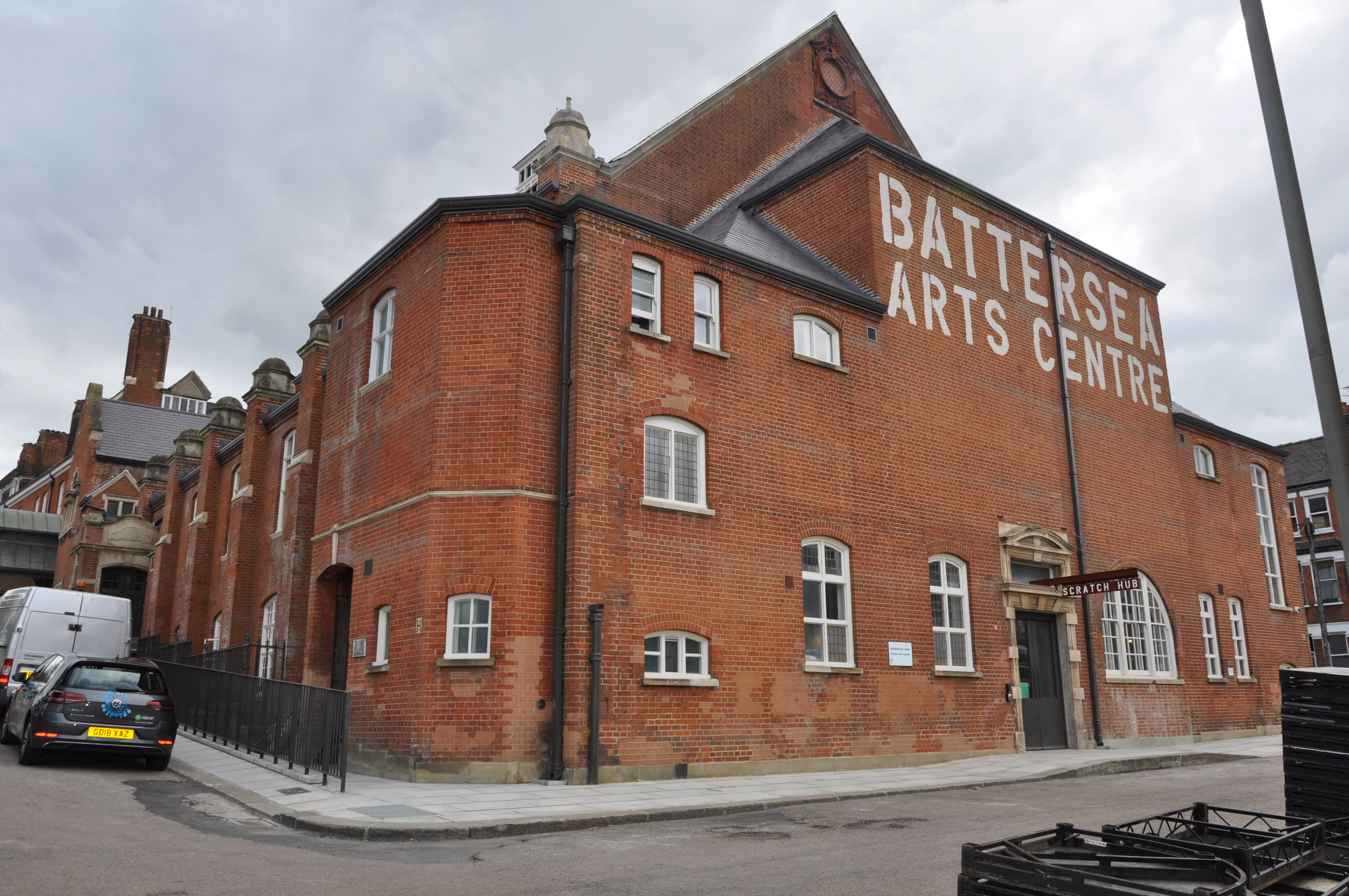
Rear elevation of Battersea Town Hall

Local government reorganisation in 1964-5 led to the dissolution of the Borough of Battersea and the incorporation of its administrative functions into a new Wandsworth council, operating from its town hall. In 1966-1967, the new council sought to replace to replace the front section of the building and the adjoining Shakespeare Theatre with a combined library, swimming pool and carpark, an idea successfully rebuffed by a combination of the Victorian Society and a new Battersea Society, as well as Nikolaus Pevsner and John Betjeman (who thought Battersea a much finer building than Wandsworth's grey town hall). The Grand and Lower Halls continued in use as community halls.

Wandsworth next sought to find tenants for the building, entering into discussion with the Department of the Environment, which was in the market for a new location for a criminal court, and with the Institution of Production Engineers; but these came to nothing. A working group led by local councillor Martin Linton was established in 1972, which recommended the re-opening of the main building for "social, community and artistic purposes"; and with sponsorship from Hugh Jenkins, then Minister of Arts, this was achieved in 1974 - entailing more minor changes to the fabric of the building to accommodate the various groups and purposes involved. The new arts centre ran for five years, closing in 1979, but re-opened in 1980 as the Battersea Arts Centre (BAC), in whose custody the building remains.

BAC have made a number of amendments to the building; notably, converting the council chamber to a theatre by the removal of its bespoke furniture; creation of a cafe in what was the borough surveyor's office and of a cinema in the former drawing office. The members' library has been repurposed as a gallery and the town clerks' office as a performance studio space. BAC's changes to the fabric of the building have been minimal, and more recent changes have emphasised the preservation and representation of original features.

The Grand Hall was extensively damaged by fire on 13 March 2015, but has been rebuilt. The hall's elaborate ceiling was entirely destroyed, and has been replaced by suspended wooden tracery patterned on the lost decorated plasterwork. The charred remains of the hall's wall panelling have been left in place. This innovative approach, together with other interventions by architects Haworth Tompkins, has created a building which The Guardian, including the town hall in its list of the Top 10 buildings of 2018, described as a "magical place that revels in the rich patina of its history. Steve Tompkins, architect of the Battersea Arts Centre redevelopment, was named the most influential person in British theatre in the 2019 The Stage 100 listing, in part for his work at Battersea.

== Heritage listings ==
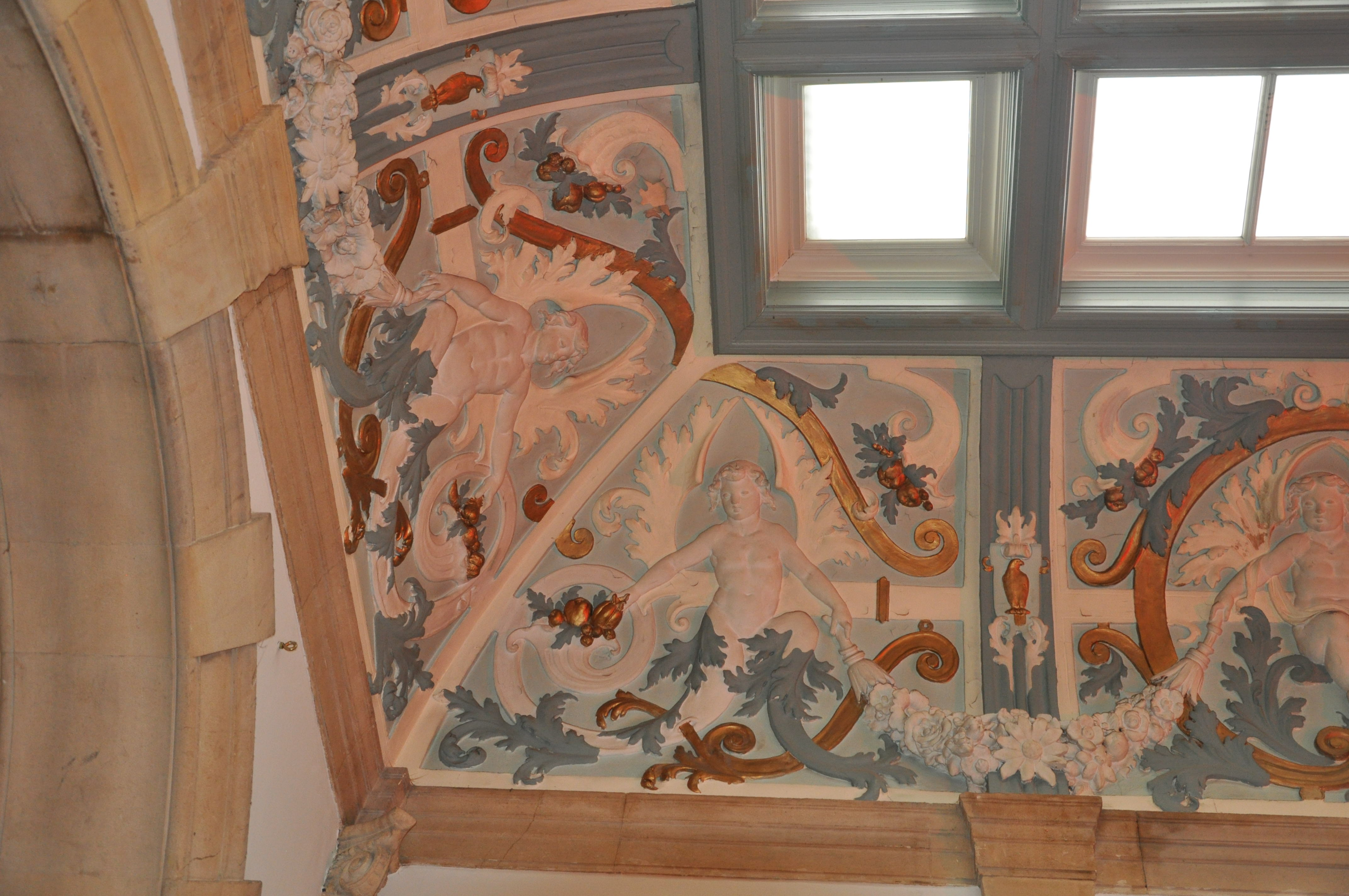
Detail of cartouches, swags and putti making up the grand hall frieze within Battersea Town Hall

The Battersea Town Hall building was designated as a Grade II* listed building on 13 February 1970; its entry adduces four reasons for the decision:

- Architectural interest: a handsome and well-preserved example of late-C19 municipal architecture with extensive relief sculpture and decorative treatment
- Designer: a notable work by EW Mountford, a distinguished figure in late Victorian/Edwardian civic architecture
- Interiors: for the survival of elaborate public rooms, in particular the monumental stair hall, council chamber, octagonal lobby and public hall
- Historic interest: it illustrates the transformation of London's antiquated vestry system into modern local government, and is one of the most ambitious manifestations of this new-found civic pride and local identity; also as the seat of one of London's leading Progressive authorities, where Britain's first black mayor, John Archer, was elected in 1913.

The town hall lies within the Town Hall Road Conservation Area, a 1989 designation made by Wandsworth Council under the Civic Amenities Act 1967 to safeguard an area identified to be of “special architectural or historic interest.”
