= Edward William Mountford =

English architect

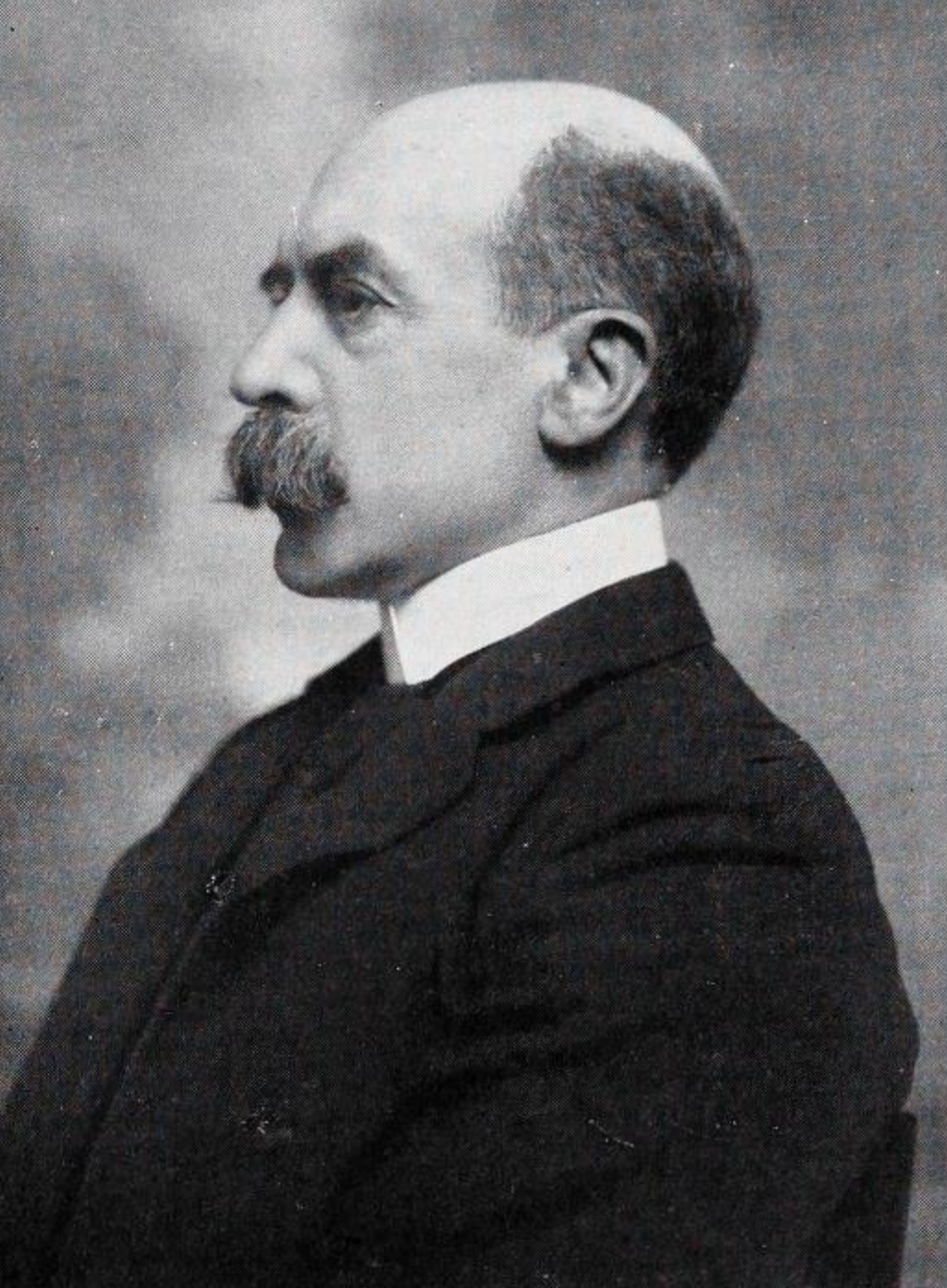
Edward William Mountford

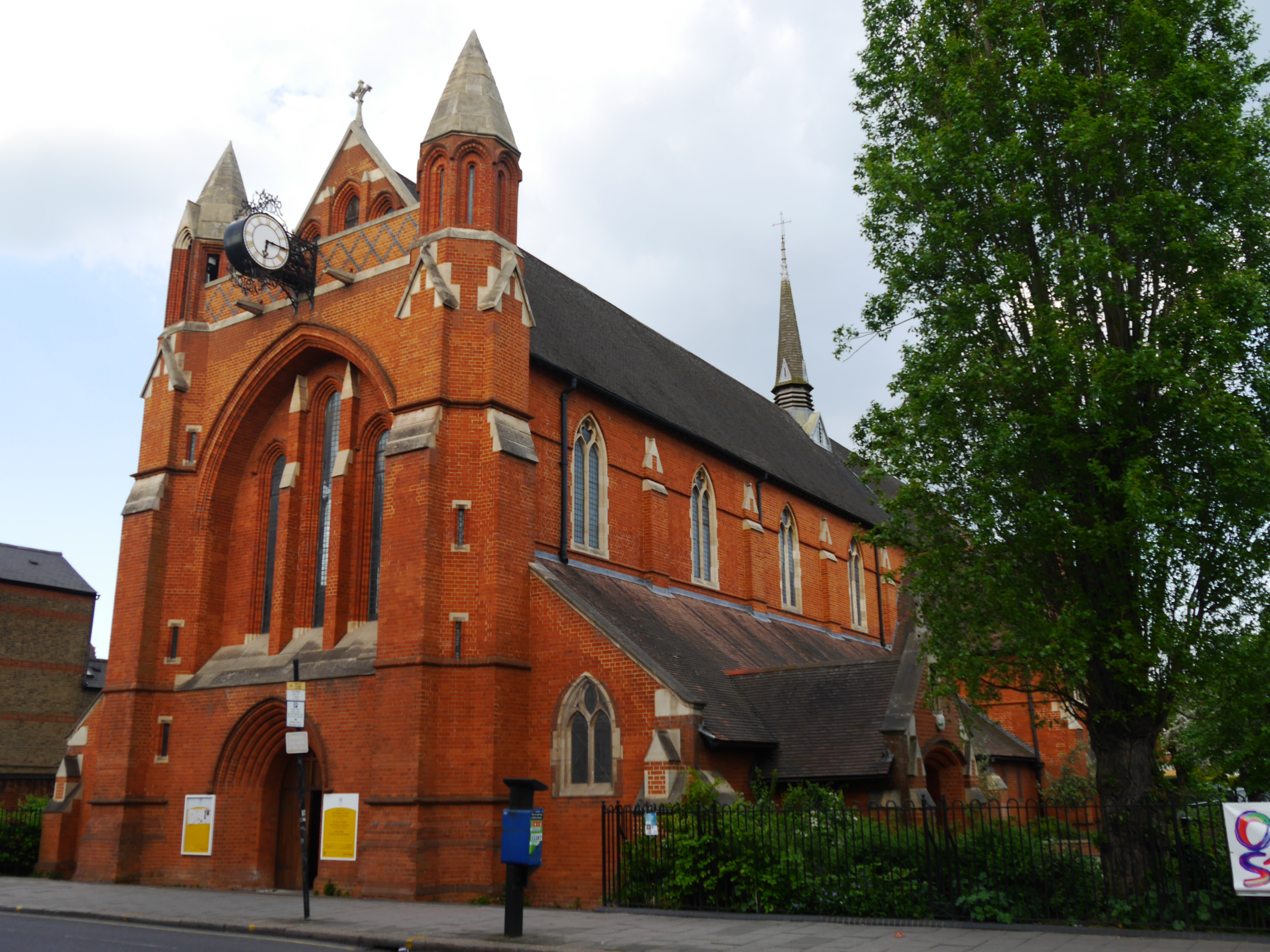
St Andrew, Earlsfield (1890/1902)

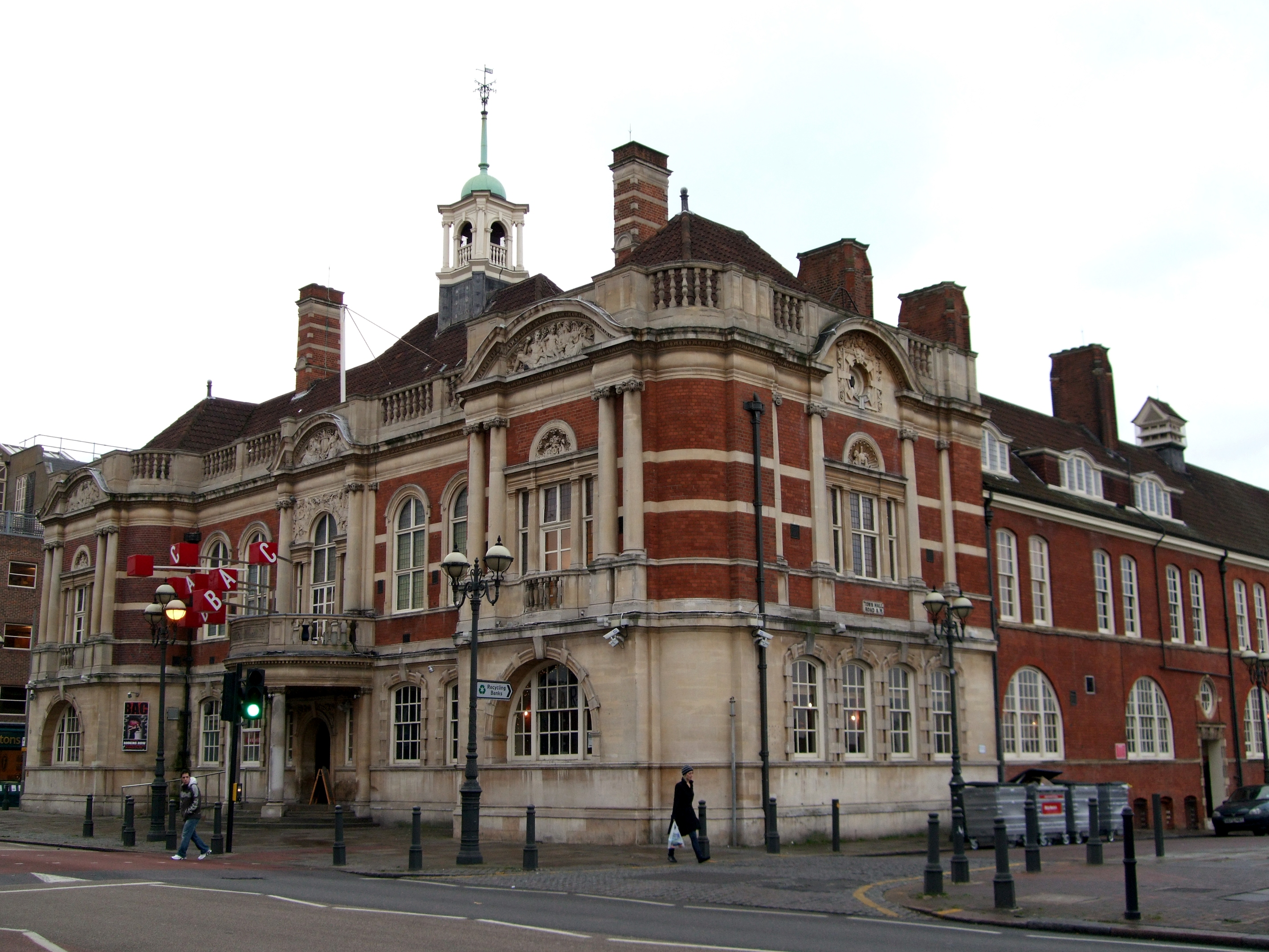
Battersea Town Hall (1891–1893)

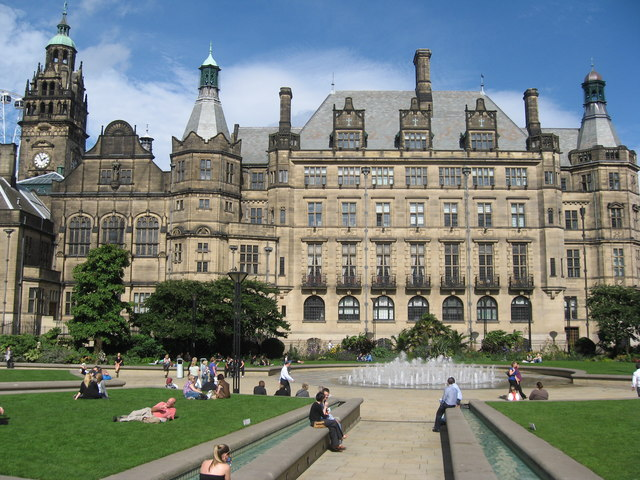
Sheffield Town Hall (1890–1897)

The Old Bailey (1900–1907)

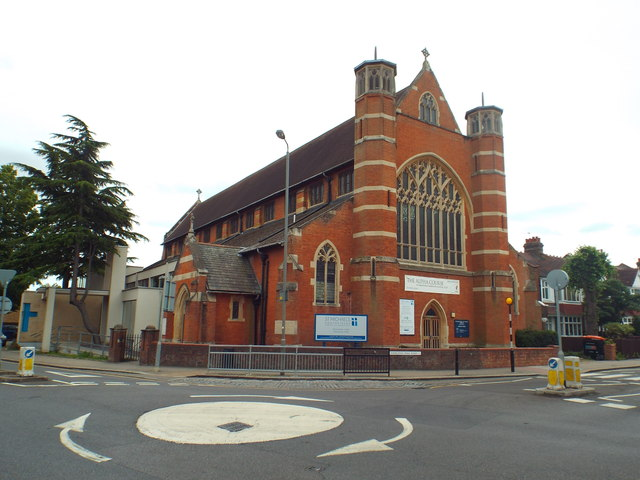
St Michael, Southfields (1901)

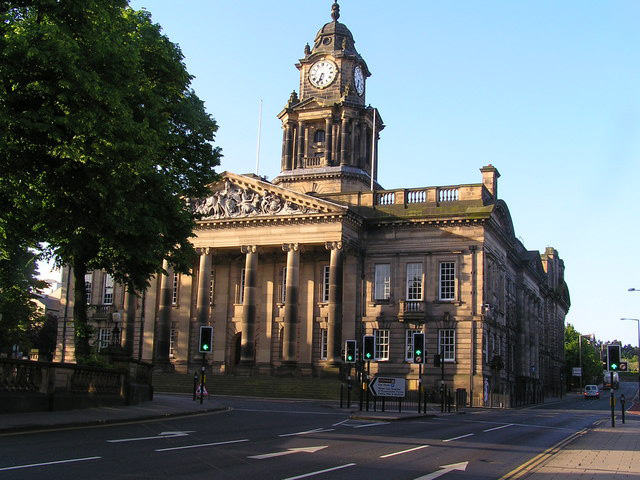
Lancaster Town Hall (1906–1909)

Edward William Mountford (22 September 1855 – 7 February 1908) was an English architect, noted for his Edwardian Baroque style, who designed a number of town halls – Sheffield, Battersea and Lancaster – as well as the Old Bailey in London. He served as President of the Architectural Association, and as a council-member of the Royal Institute of British Architects, but died young at the age of 52, "removing from the front rank of the profession a very able and distinguished architect."

== Life ==
Mountford was born in Shipston-on-Stour, Warwickshire, on 22 September 1855, the son of Edward Mountford, a draper, and his Northamptonshire-born wife Eliza Devonshire. The family lived in the Cotswolds in his youth, and he was educated privately in Clevedon, Somerset.

In 1872 he was articled to Messrs. Habershon & Pite of Bloomsbury Square, where his contemporaries included William Howard Seth-Smith and A. R. G. Fenning, later acting as the practice's Clerk of Works. He was later for a time part of the practice of George Elkington, and afterwards employed by Messrs. Giles, Gough & Trollope.

He entered into practice on his own account in 1881, engaged in the design, chiefly, of churches and schools, often carried out in conjunction with H. D. Searles-Wood. He developed his practice by entering public competitions for public libraries, hospitals, and convalescent homes. Early commissions include the New Baptist Chapel on Northcote Road, Battersea (1884–5); a cottage hospital at Whitchurch, Shropshire (1885); and the Ellen Badger Hospital in Shipston-on-Stour, Warwickshire (1886).

His profile was raised immeasurably by winning the competition for the design of Sheffield Town Hall (1890–1897), a grand palatial structure reflecting and serving as a symbol of the civic pride of the newly autonomous northern metropolitan council. In much the same period he was successful on three occasions in competitions run by the Battersea Vestry, being commissioned to design the Battersea Central Library (1889–1890); the Battersea Polytechnic Institute (1891); and the Battersea Town Hall (1891–1893). Further commissions via competition followed, including the Central Criminal Court of England and Wales (1900–1907) and Lancaster Town Hall (1906–1909). Although he saw the former to completion, he predeceased the construction of the latter, which was completed by his partner F. Dale Clapham.

Mountford is seen as one of the initiators of the Wrenaissance style of Baroque Revival architecture which characterises many British and Empire public buildings during the Edwardian era; Edwin Lutyens was a fellow exponent of the style – and Mountford and Lutyens had a form of connection via their work in Munstead Heath, where Lutyens designed Munstead Wood for Gertrude Jekyll and Mountford build Munstead Grange – Jekyll advising on his garden design – as his country house. Mountford was awarded a silver medal at the Exposition Universelle (1900) for his Edwardian baroque designs. His domestic architecture, however, appears to have been influenced by the architecture of his Gloucestershire, Somerset and Warwickshire youth.

He was also noted for championing the blending of sculpture and art with architecture, working with sculptors such as Paul Montford (on Battersea Town Hall), F. W. Pomeroy, and Gilbert Seale, and with muralist Gerald Moira and the Arts and Crafts exponent William Richmond.

Mountford was very active in developing the architectural profession throughout his later career, holding for many years committee positions in the Architectural Association, including serving as its president from 1893–94 and acting as an advisor of its school of architecture. He was made a fellow of the Royal Institute of British Architects in 1890, and in later years served on its council until his death in 1908.

He was described as genial, and “a bluff, kindly, humorous, thoroughly English President” of the Architectural Association; and although plagued by arthritis in later years, was known as an enthusiast for all kinds of sport, notably fishing, rowing, football, and as a well-known member of the Surrey Cricket Club.

Mountford married twice, to Jessie Smith (18 June 1888) and, following her death, Dorothy Hounsham (11 July 1903). He had a son (who became an architect) from his first marriage, and a daughter from his second. He resided in Wandsworth, where he was active in the local community; he furnished the south chapel of St Anne's Church, Wandsworth, in memory of his first wife. He died in London on 7 February 1908.

== Legacy ==
Mountford’s contributions to British architecture extend beyond his buildings. His influence is acknowledged in the legal profession through Mountford Chambers, a barristers’ chambers in London named in his honour. This naming reflects recognition of his architectural legacy, including his design of significant public buildings like the Old Bailey, which remains a key component of the UK’s legal heritage.

== Notable buildings: chronological order ==
- Ellen Badger Hospital 1886
- Battersea Central Library 1889–1890
- Sheffield Town Hall 1890–1897
- St Andrew's, Earlsfield 1890/1902
- Hitchin Town Hall 1900–01
- Battersea Town Hall 1891–1893
- St Olave's Grammar School (Southwark site) 1893
- Northampton Institute 1896
- Old Bailey 1900–1907
- St Michael and All Angels, Southfields, 1901
- Munstead Grange and Munstead Lodge, Godalming, Surrey, 1902.
- Lancaster Town Hall 1906–1909
- College of Technology and Museum Extension 1896–1909

=== With Herbert Appleton ===
- St Paul's Church, Forest Hill 1882 (destroyed by bombing 1943)
- Beckenham Baptist Church (Elm Road Chapel), Beckenham 1883–84
