= Nappy (disambiguation) =

Nappy is a term in the English language in Australia, Ireland, New Zealand, South Africa, United Kingdom, and Zimbabwe for a diaper.

Nappy may also refer to:

- Nappy Creek, a stream in Alaska
- Nappy Valley, a term for a neighbourhood with a large number of families with young children
- Nappy Brown, stage name of American R&B singer Napoleon Brown Goodson Culp (1929–2008)
- Joseph Nappy Lamare (1905–1988), American jazz banjoist, guitarist and singer
- Nappy, an adjective for Afro-textured hair (often offensive)
