= Shaftesbury Park Estate =

Housing estate in Battersea, London

Coordinates: 51°28′08″N 0°09′18″W

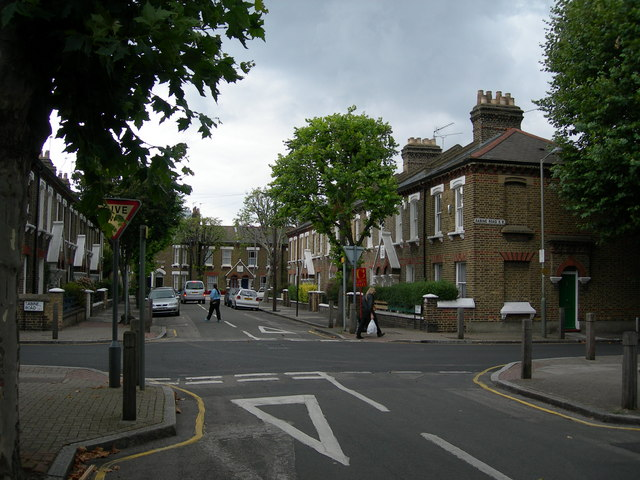
The junction of Eland Road and Sabine Road, on the estate

The Shaftesbury Park Estate, commonly known as The Shaftesbury Estate, is a residential estate in Battersea in South London, England. It lies north of Lavender Hill and Clapham Common and east of Clapham Junction railway station.

The estate occupies a flat area of land at the edge of the River Thames flood plain, just north of the slope rising to Clapham Common. Historically, the area was occupied by Battersea Fields, the poorly drained common land covering the area as far as the river. The Heathwall River ran along the foot of the slope and drained into the River Effra and Falcon Brook, making Battersea an island; present-day Heathwall Street marks the line of this watercourse. A stream crossed the area on the line of present-day Grayshott Road.

== History ==
In the Middle Ages the area was known as Pig Hill because of the large number of piggeries in the area. The Domesday Book says that brickmaking was carried on in some fields on Pig Hill. Cattle breeding also flourished to some extent in the area. Pig Hill formed part of Latchmoor Common, an area of common land belonging to the parish for the common good.

Under the power of the Inclosure Act 1836 (6 & 7 Will. 4. c. 115), the overseer of any parish had the power to enclose waste or common land, less than 50 acres (200,000 m^{2}), lying in or near the parish. Under the Act, the parish then had to cultivate and improve such waste land for the use and benefit of the parish, and also had the power to let such enclosed land in allotments to the inhabitants of the parish to be cultivated on their own account. Taking advantage of this Act, the churchwardens and overseers of Battersea enclosed about 16 acres (65,000 m^{2}) of Latchmoor Common and let it out in allotments at a low rental, to the residents of the parish, for the cultivation of vegetables.

At the start of the seventeenth century, the allotments were flourishing and Battersea had become famous for its market gardening. The gardeners were known for their quality produce which fetched high prices in the London markets and were the first growers to cultivate and introduce asparagus. One gardener had 40 acres (160,000 m^{2}) of asparagus under cultivation, and at one time there were three hundred acres of market gardens within a mile of St Mary's Church, Battersea. The gardens were most probably improved by the Huguenots who settled in Wandsworth in 1639.

When Pig Hill became Latchmere Road this land was known as the Latchmere allotments. The allotments were later sold to Samuel Poupart (the rail junction to the north is still known as Poupart's Junction) and became known as Poupart's Market Garden.

== Housing ==
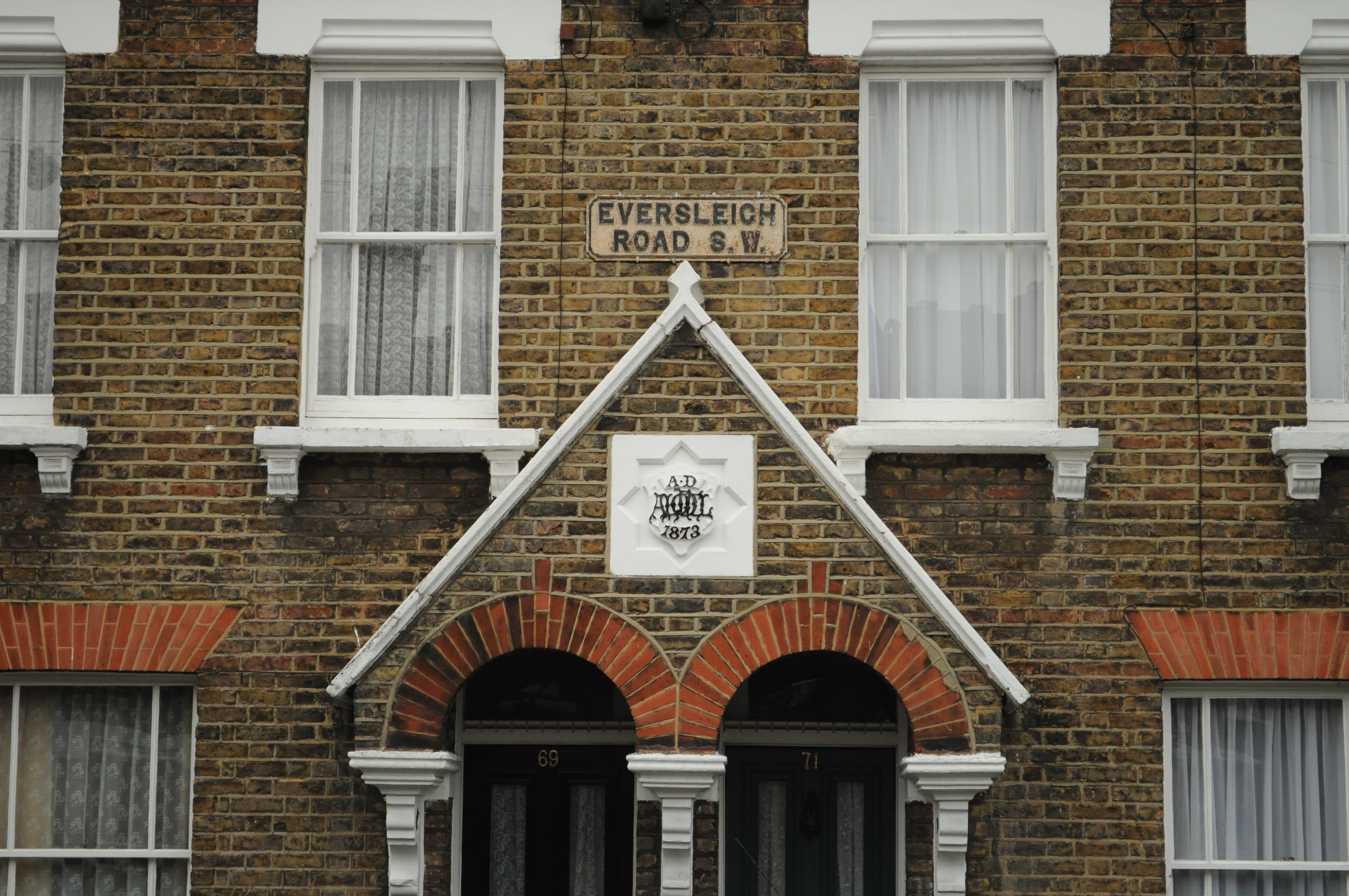
An example of the characteristically "paired" doors of the Victorian terraces

In the 1870s, it became residential when the Artizans, Labourers and General Dwelling Company, a housing co-operative founded in 1867 by William Austin, built several thousand small homes on it.

The company was dedicated to providing decent accommodation for the working classes at a time when overcrowding and squalid living conditions were rife amongst the poor. Money was raised to undertake small developments for sale, the proceeds of which were then invested in larger estates, like Shaftesbury Park, for renting.

The land for the Battersea estate was purchased in 1872; three other estates were developed elsewhere. The original concept was to combine new housing of various classes with social facilities such as meeting rooms, school rooms, a wash house and baths, and to provide integral open space (3 acres of the 40 acres (160,000 m^{2}) bought). One facility certainly not to be provided on the estate was a public house, which was an attempt by the reformers behind the scheme to avoid the social problems of cheap alcohol.

At the same time as the conception of the estate, the social reformer and peer Anthony Ashley-Cooper, 7th Earl of Shaftesbury was pushing legislation through parliament to improve the living and employment conditions of working people and sponsoring philanthropic efforts to provide schooling for their children. Under Shaftesbury's guardianship new so-called Ragged Schools were established providing free education in 1844. On 3 August 1872, Shaftesbury laid the foundation-stone of buildings at the estate, thus giving it a name.

The estate layout and house designs were by the company's Architect and Surveyor, Robert Austin, formerly a carpenter with the company. However, financial difficulties, caused by poor accounting, led to replacement of the directors of the company and a change of approach during the construction of the estate. Rents and lease prices were raised, excluding many lower paid workers who were originally intended to benefit, and the planned area of open space was built over – Brassey Square in the centre of the estate.

== Buildings and townscape ==
The estate was built between 1873 and 1877 and comprises about 1,200 two-storey houses with gardens laid out in wide tree-lined streets. The estate houses are of four basic types or classes distinguished by the number of rooms (only the highest class originally had bathrooms). The street elevations are varied slightly to avoid monotony, creating generally attractive street frontages.

They are consistently of stock brick with red brick dressings and pitched slate roofs, which gives the estate a sense of identity and distinctiveness. The grid layout, with streets of varying lengths but always straight (except Eversleigh Road, which is aligned with the railway embankment), allows for easy movement throughout the estate. There is a sense of formality in the townscape arising from the grid layout and the repetition in the building frontages.

The Peabody Trust owns most of the estate, but many homes are already privately owned, and the number continues to rise as the Trust gradually releases more units for sale.

== Governance ==
The Shaftesbury Park Estate is part of the Battersea constituency for elections to the House of Commons of the United Kingdom.

The Shaftesbury Park Estate is covered by the Shaftesbury and Queenstown ward for elections to Wandsworth London Borough Council.
