= A3036 road =

Road in southwest London

A3036

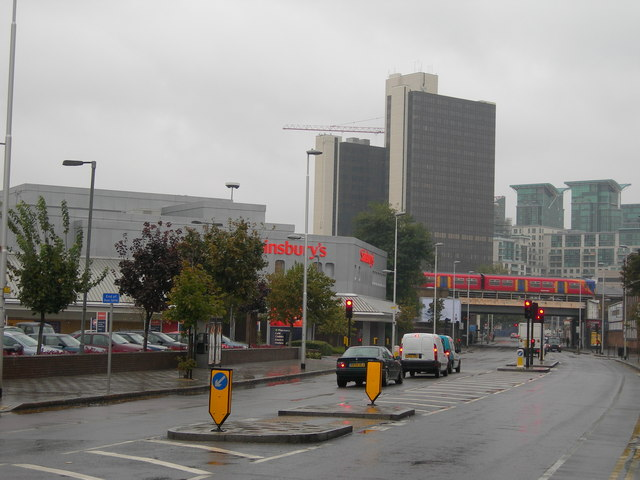
- Wandsworth Road, SW8. Sainsbury's Nine Elms store is on the left, and to the right of the picture a South West Trains service has just left Vauxhall Station, heading away from Waterloo.

Route information
- Length: 4.7 mi (7.6 km)

Major junctions
- North end: Waterloo
- A302; A3203; A202; A3205; A3216; A3220; A3207; A3; A214
- South end: Wandsworth

Location
- Country: United Kingdom
- Constituent country: England

Road network
- Roads in the United Kingdom; Motorways; A and B road zones

The A3036 is an A road in London, England, running from Waterloo to Wandsworth.

== Route ==
It starts at the southern tip of the County Hall roundabout (51.5003°N 0.1168°W), where the A302 Westminster Bridge, York Road and A23 Westminster Bridge Road all intersect.

=== Lambeth Palace Road ===
This stretch of the route is called Lambeth Palace Road and heads southwest, past St Thomas' Hospital and at the southern end meets Palace itself, the London base of the Archbishop of Canterbury at the roundabout junction with the A3203 at Lambeth Bridge, where it runs along the south side of the Thames.

==== History ====
The road was constructed in the 1860s at the same time as the Albert Embankment as part of the land reclamation that allowed the construction of St Thomas' Hospital. The road originally ran in a straight line parallel to the river, with views between the pavilion blocks of the hospital to the Thames.

Since the redevelopment of the hospital in the 1960s, the road now follows a route further inland, although its original alignment through the hospital as a continuation of Belvedere Road can still be seen between later buildings. Because the expansion of the hospital and the new road layout eliminated Stangate Triangle, a protected London square, an area of land on the east of the road was provided as an extension to Archbishop's Park in compensation.

==== Notable residents ====
- Thomas Neill Cream, serial killer, lodged at number 103, near St Thomas's Hospital, from 1891 to 1892.

=== Albert Embankment ===
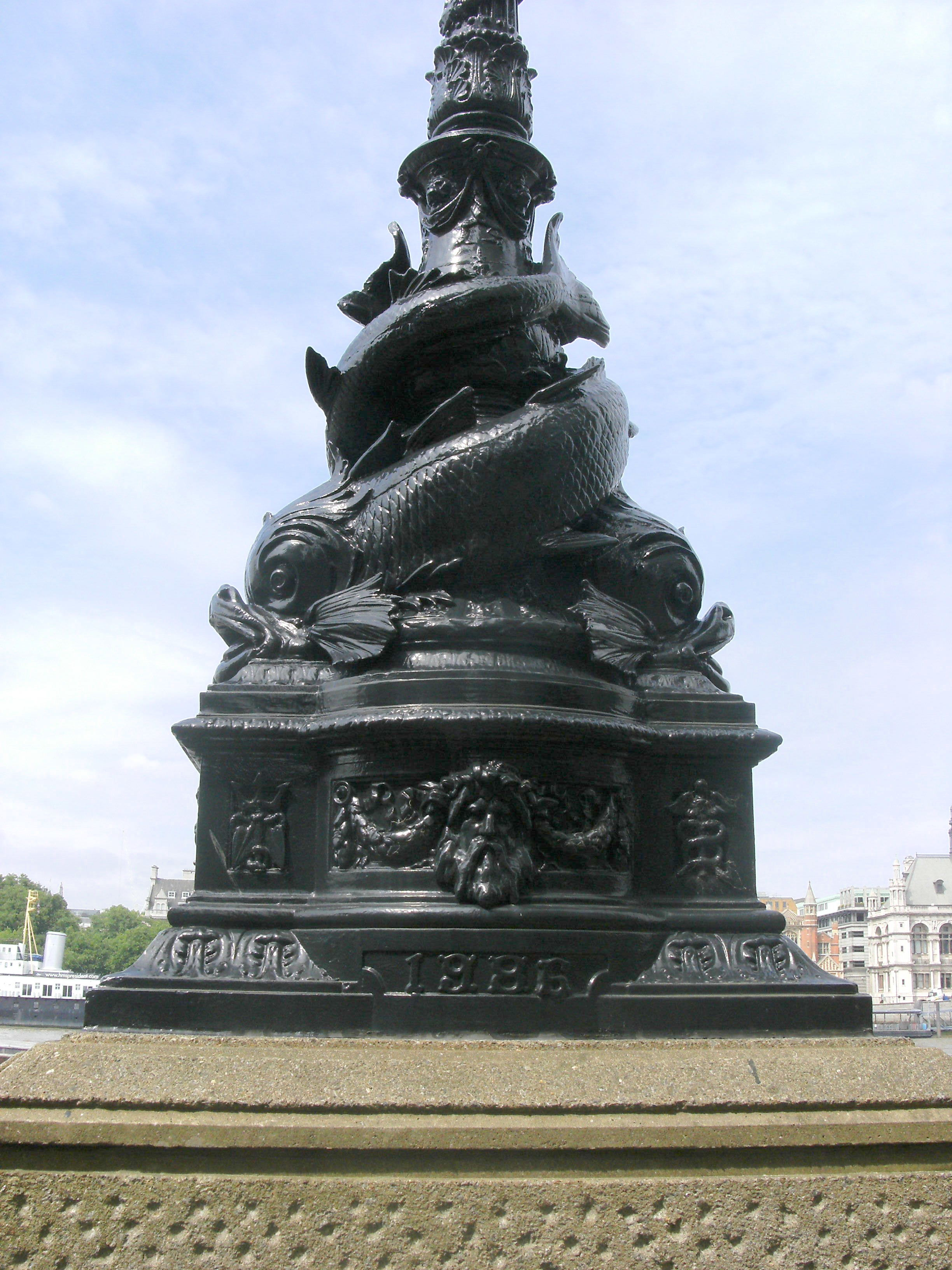
Sturgeon lamp standards line the embankment.

After this, the road is called Albert Embankment and continues to run alongside the river, until it passes the MI6 headquarters at the major junction known as Vauxhall Cross, where the A202 Vauxhall Bridge, Durham Street and Harleyford Road, the A203 South Lambeth Road, and the A3205 Nine Elms Lane all converge.

Albert Embankment is part of the river bank on the south side of the River Thames in Central London. It stretches approximately one mile (1.6 km) northward from Vauxhall Bridge to Westminster Bridge, and is located in the London Borough of Lambeth.

==== History ====
The Albert Embankment was built for the Metropolitan Board of Works under the immediate direction of engineer John Grant (not Sir Joseph Bazalgette, as is commonly supposed; Bazalgette was chief engineer to the Board). It was commenced in September 1865, and opened in May 1868. The purpose was to create a new highway and open space, and to help even out irregularities in the riverfront (since malodorous mud accumulated in the wider places). It is sometimes said the Albert Embankment was created to prevent flooding in the Lambeth area, but that was not its purpose. In fact the Albert Embankment was built on arches to permit vessels to continue to access landside business premises, such as draw docks; these already had their own defensive walls — as did most of the tidal Thames. After the Embankment was completed, floods continued to occur owing to defects in these walls (e.g. in 1877 and 1928). Any flood protection the Embankment gave was incidental.

Unlike Bazalgette's Thames Embankment (including Chelsea Embankment and Victoria Embankment), the Albert Embankment does not incorporate major interceptor sewers. This allowed the southern section of the embankment (upstream from Lambeth Bridge) to include a pair of tunnels onto a small slipway, named White Hart Draw Dock, whose origins can be traced back to the 14th century. This is contrary to the popular myth that the dock was built and used by the nearby Royal Doulton's pottery works to transport clay and finished goods to and from the Port of London. From spring 2009, refurbishment of White Hart Dock commenced as part of an ongoing public art project being delivered by Lambeth council.

Some of the reclaimed land was sold to the trustees of St Thomas' Hospital. To the north of Lambeth Bridge, the embankment is a narrower pedestrian promenade in front of the hospital, with motor traffic carried behind the hospital on Lambeth Palace Road.

In common with other 'Bazalgatte' works, the original embankment is adorned with sturgeon lamp standards to the designs of George Vulliamy. The southern limit of Bazalgatte's embankment was opposite Tinworth Street, where the road moves away from the riverside.

The stretch south of Tinworth Street was occupied by industrial and wharf premises until after World War II. These areas have subsequently been redeveloped as offices, with extensions to the embankment being constructed to a more utilitarian design than the Bazalgatte/Vulliamy stretch. Public pedestrian access to this newer embankment was only secured in the 1990s. Parts of this section of the embankment have a provisional appearance, as the landowners still have hopes for future redevelopment that could move the embankment line further into the river. However, encroachment of the tidal river bed habitat is contrary to the current planning policies of Lambeth.

Albert Embankment is also the name given to the part of the A3036 road between Vauxhall Bridge and Lambeth Bridge, where it adjoins Lambeth Palace Road and Lambeth Road. On the west side of this road adjacent to Vauxhall Bridge is the SIS Building, while on the east side nearer to Lambeth Bridge are the International Maritime Organization (IMO) building and the former headquarters of the London Fire Brigade. In the Thames opposite is London's only river fire station, home to two fireboats.

=== Wandsworth Road ===
From Vauxhall, the route is then called Wandsworth Road until it crosses the A3216 Queenstown Road / Cedars Road junction in Battersea.

=== Lavender Hill ===
At that point the street name changes to Lavender Hill, continuing until Clapham Junction.

Lavender Hill is a hill, and a shopping and residential street, near Clapham Junction in Battersea, south London. Lavender Hill forms the section of the A3036 as it rises eastwards out of the Falconbrook valley at Clapham Junction, and retains that name for approximately 1.3 km (0.81 mi) to the corner of Queenstown Road in Battersea, beyond which it is called Wandsworth Road towards Vauxhall.

==== History ====
===== Origin of the name =====
The earliest known reference to the name 'Lavender Hill' is in 1774 when a Mr Porter, advertising a reward for the return of his lost pony, described it as having strayed or been stolen from 'a Field on Lavender-Hill', suggesting that the name was already widely known. The road formed part of the Southwark to Kingston Turnpike from 1717.

The name refers to the commercial cultivation of lavender on the gentle north-facing slopes of this part of the Thames estuary – helped by well-drained soil, fresh air and several natural springs.

The first building to reflect the name was Lavender Hall on the south side of the road in 1790. The road itself, which ran just below the crest of the hill, was not widely referred to as Lavender Hill until the later 1800s. Several smaller streets developed in the Victoria era, including Lavender Gardens, Lavender Walk (an ancient farm lane) and Lavender Sweep, also reflect the area's historic lavender industry.

===== Early development =====
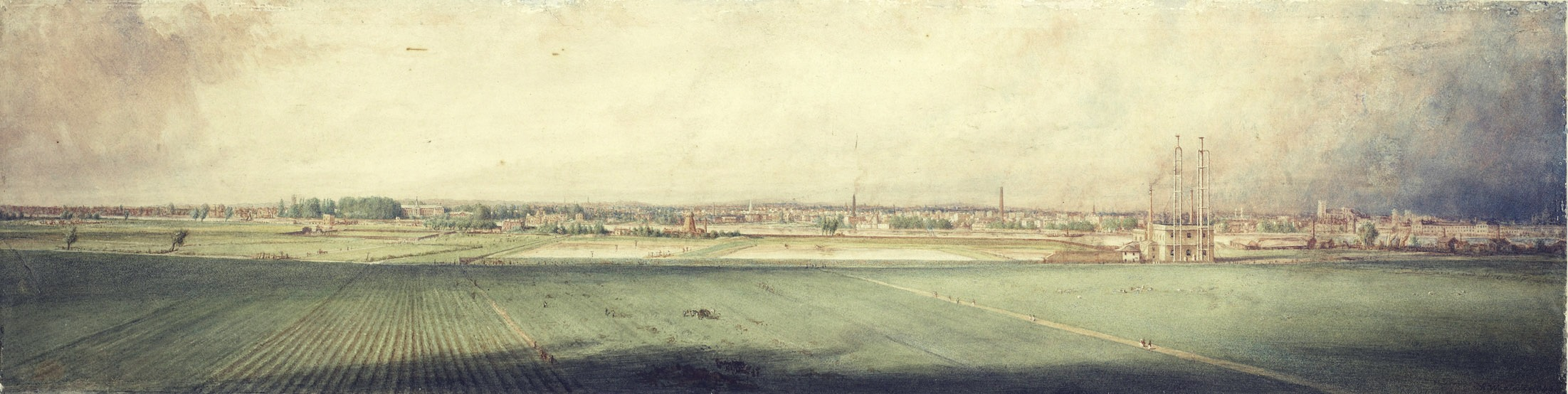
The view from Battersea New Town, painted in 1848 by Robert Westall, showing wide open fields, the then-new Battersea pumping station (built in 1840), and distant views of Westminster Abbey and the Royal Hospital Chelsea. This view encouraged the early construction of several villas among the Lavender fields.

Until the 1860s Lavender Hill was mostly an area of open farmland, with small-scale development at both ends. At the western end there was a crossing of the Falconbrook river with several farms. The Chestnuts, a farmhouse built in 1812, survived and has been incorporated into the modern street plan halfway along Mossbury Road. The earliest reference to the still-existing Falcon public house at the west end of the street is in 1767.

After the 1780s a few large villas were built on the hillside, owned by wealthy residents attracted by the expansive views over Battersea Fields and the Thames towards London. The earliest was Rush Hill House, developed in around 1770, whose fate was typical of many of these early buildings: as the area developed, its grounds were sold off in 1872 and developed as a new street and terrace of houses (Rush Hill Terrace), and the house itself survived until 1887 before being replaced by a further terrace of houses (Crombie Mews).

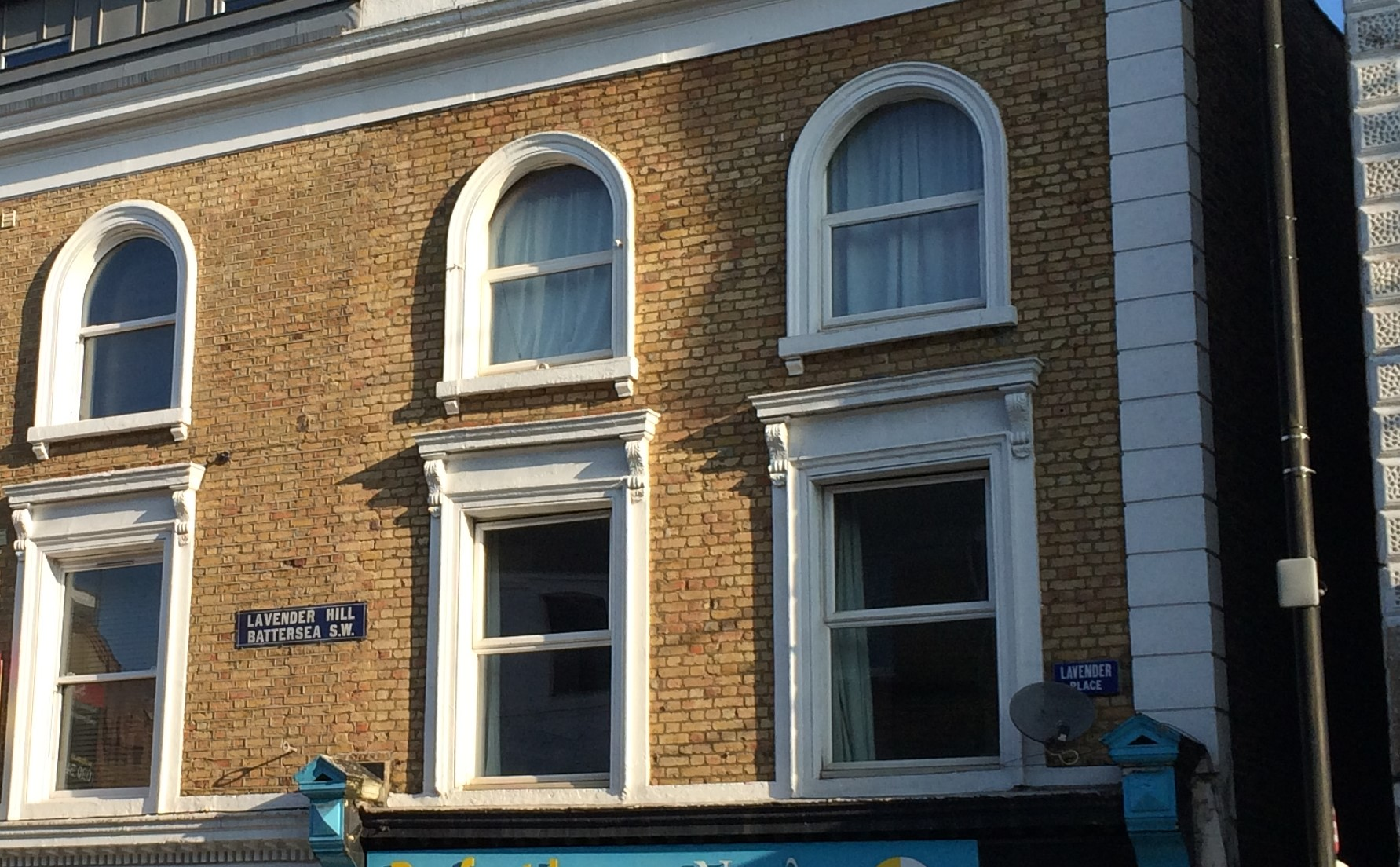
Street name signs for "Lavender Hill" and "Lavender Place" are still visible at 16 Lavender Hill

Lavender Place was developed in around 1826 as a row of cottages at the eastern end of what is now Lavender Hill. The clean air and supply of fresh water meant Lavender Place became home in the early-to-mid nineteenth century to several laundresses, who bleached and dried linen on the grassland behind the houses. Lavender Place extended some distance into what is now Wandsworth Road, and remained a separate street for many years (one ceramic street name for 'Lavender Place' is still visible). An acetic acid distillery, Beaufoy's Acetic Acid Works, was also located at the eastern end (for many years a public house called the Beaufoy remained at this end of Lavender Hill; the only surviving trace of the distillery is now a short street called Beaufoy Road). In the 1870s the houses on Lavender Terrace were adapted to form a terrace of shops, and the houses on Lavender Place were eventually renumbered to become part of Lavender Hill.

===== Victorian era =====
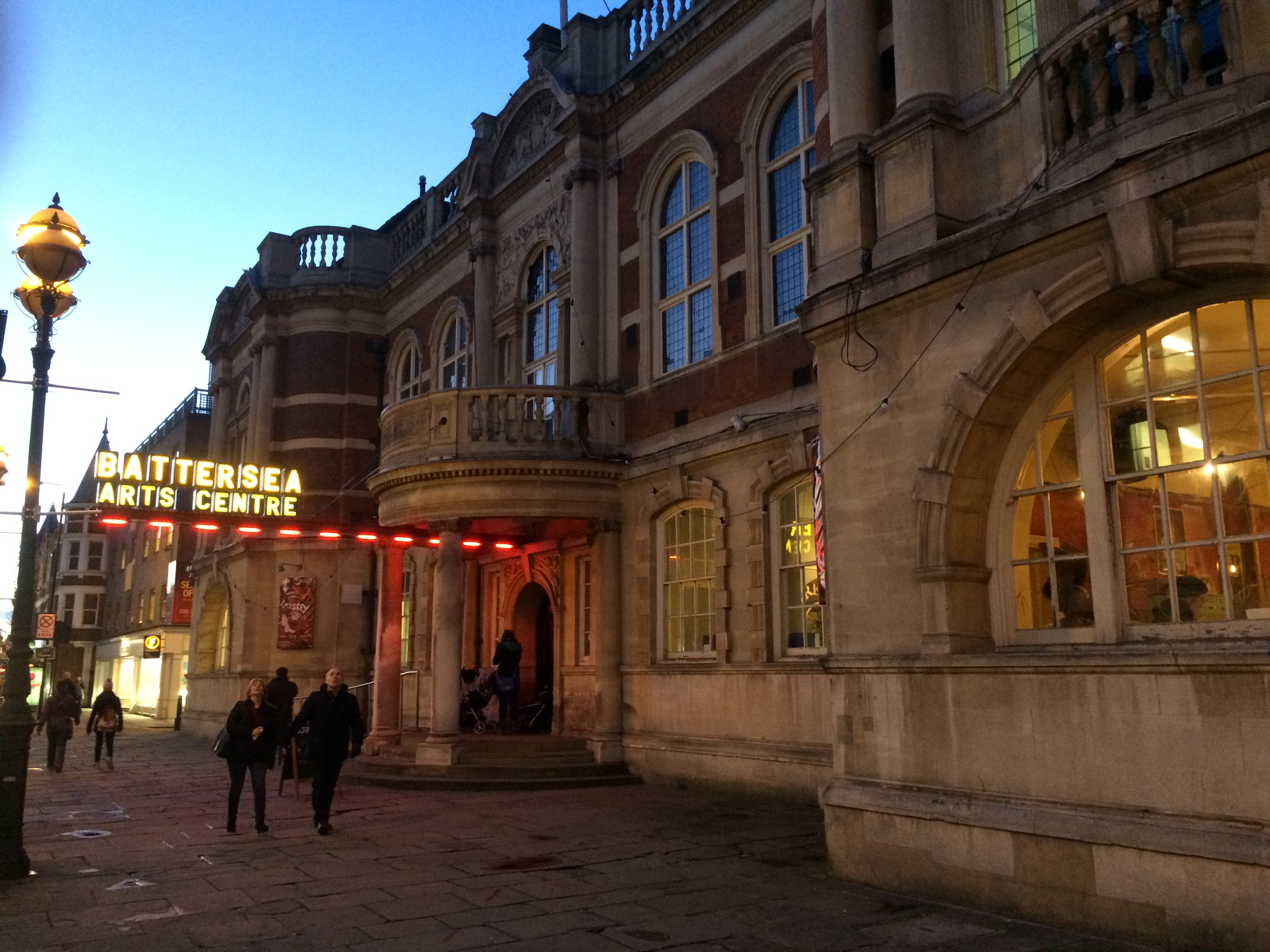
Battersea Arts Centre, formerly Battersea Town Hall

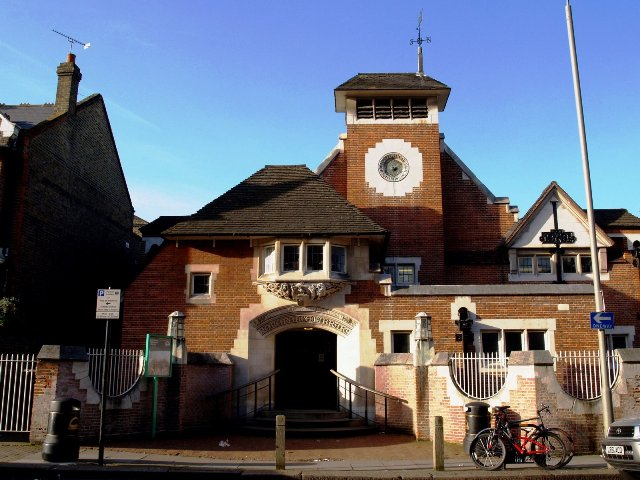
The Grade II listed 1920 Battersea Reference Library extension

The opening of Clapham Junction railway station in 1863 led to rapid residential and commercial development along the street, with construction of a large number of houses as well as many major civic and commercial buildings. By 1885 it was such a busy commercial district that Arding & Hobbs, the largest department store south of the River Thames, was built.

The imposing Church of the Ascension, designed by James Brooks, was built in 1883 to cater to the growing population of the neighbouring Shaftesbury Estate. A Welsh Methodist chapel was built on Beauchamp Road, reflecting what was once a significant Welsh population.

Battersea Central Library was opened in March 1890, following an architectural competition that was won by Edward William Mountford (who also designed the Old Bailey) with a mildly Flemish Renaissance design that was described as "inexpensively devised and designed to not needlessly clash with the adjoining houses which are of the speculating builders' type of work". It quickly proved popular and saw several subsequent extensions, notably with the addition in 1924 of a reference library on Altenburg Gardens (in a part of the original plot that had originally been intended for a museum) that was designed by Henry Hyams.

Battersea Town Hall was opened in 1893, as the administrative headquarters of the Metropolitan Borough of Battersea, and the large Grade II* listed building is one of Lavender Hill's most prominent features. When the Borough was abolished in 1965, the Town Hall became redundant. After being threatened with demolition for some years, plans to build a new library and swimming pool on the site were finally rejected following a campaign by residents to save the building, and it was then converted into a community arts centre in 1974. The Battersea Arts Centre is now a major arts venue.

The Shakespeare Theatre was built in 1896, next to the Town Hall. It was severely damaged in the Second World War, before being demolished in 1957 and replaced by an office building called Shakespeare House.

A large Central Post Office, designed by Jasper Wager, was built in 1898, and extended with a sorting office designed by John Rutherford in around 1913 (although the original buildings were replaced by a modern structure designed by an unknown architect at the Ministry of Works in 1961).

==== In popular culture ====
The street is known in popular culture thanks to the BAFTA Award-winning 1951 Ealing comedy The Lavender Hill Mob. The film was so-named because the lead character, Henry Holland, lives in a seedy boarding house on the street, the 'Balmoral Private Hotel' where he and fellow resident (and foundry owner) Alfred Pendlebury meet and hatch the 'perfect' plot to steal a load of gold bullion.

Lavender Hill is featured with a chapter of its own in the historical novel London by Edward Rutherfurd, with descriptions of it in the 19th century from the pre-industrial era.

Lavender Hill featured as a site location for many British TV shows, including On the Buses and The Sweeney, in the 1970s.

In 1967 the English group The Kinks recorded a whimsical song entitled "Lavender Hill" which may have been under consideration as a follow-up single to Waterloo Sunset, but was rejected in favour of Autumn Almanac. The song was eventually released in the U.S. in 1973 on The Great Lost Kinks Album, and has been described as "a southerner's counterpoint to the Beatles' Penny Lane".

Notable former inhabitant include Sarah Ferguson, who lived in a flat in Lavender Gardens before her marriage. The first black Mayor in London, John Archer, was elected at Battersea Town Hall in 1913 after serving as a councillor for the Battersea Latchmere ward, north of Lavender Hill.

==== Contemporary ====
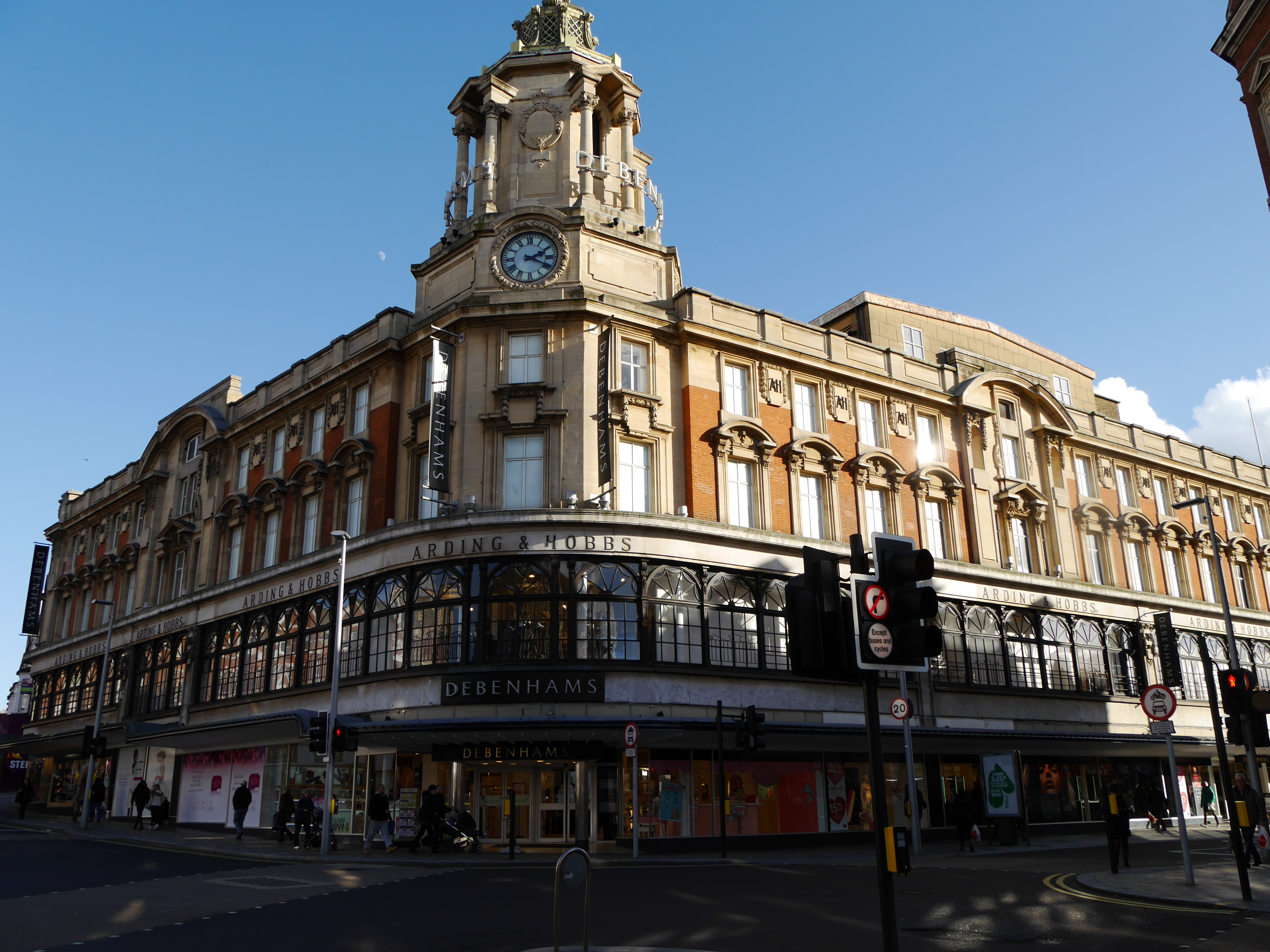
Grand commercial architecture at Arding and Hobbs department store (also a Debenhams until the 2020s)

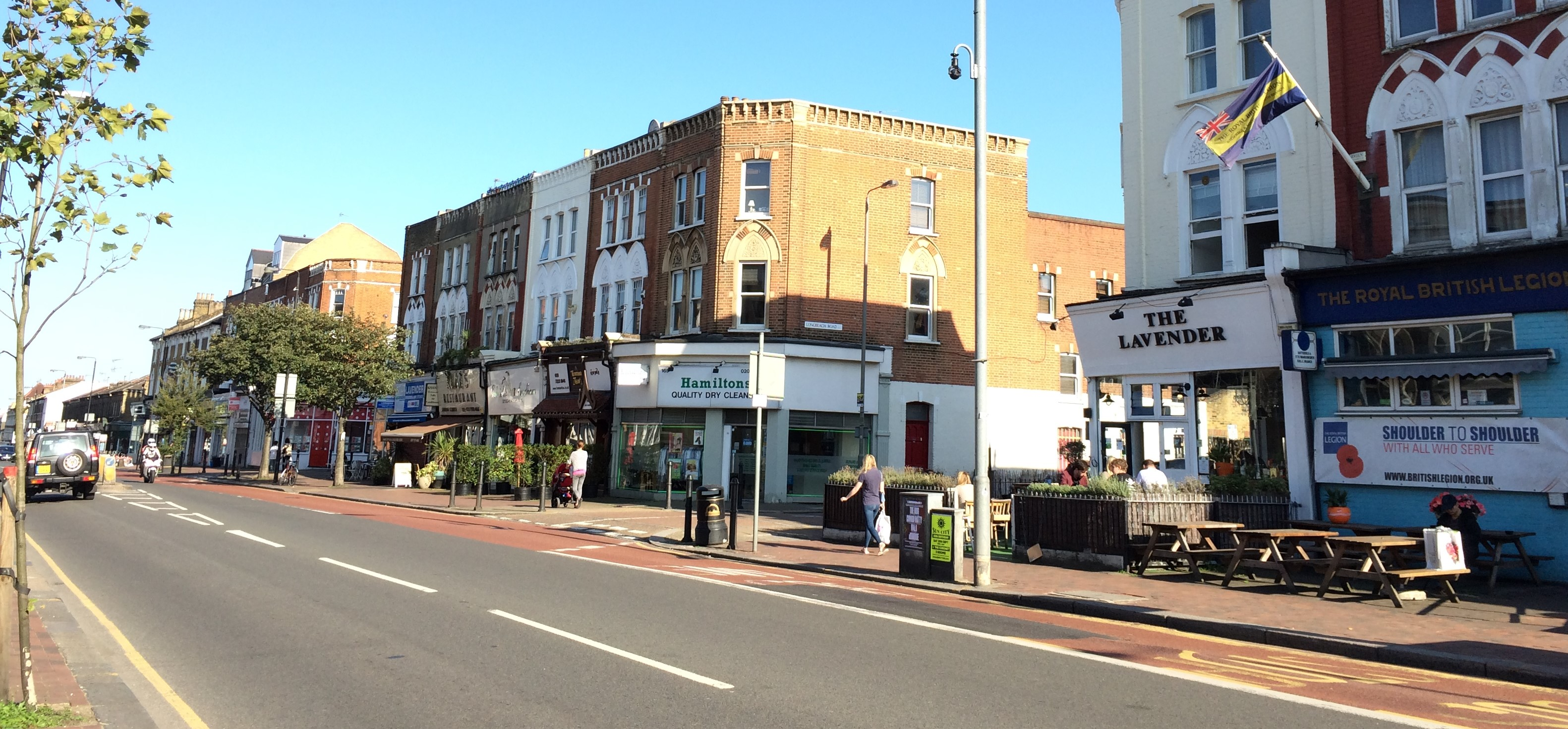
More modestly designed shops in the central section, many of which have since been converted to restaurants and cafes

===== Retail =====
Lavender Hill is now principally a shopping and restaurant street along much of its length, with around 200 retail units in total. The Lavender Hill Traders' Association runs the annual Lavender Festival, to raise the profile of the street as a shopping and entertainment destination.

The western end of the street has the highest footfall, due to large commuter flows towards Clapham Junction station. Its architecture is dominated by the landmark Arding & Hobbs building (the greater part of which was later the department store of Debenhams), a number of restaurants and cafes (including a branch of Pizza Express with decoration loosely themed on The Lavender Hill Mob). There is a large Asda supermarket with an underground car park, and a branch of Whole Foods Market. This section also includes the Battersea central Post Office and telephone exchange, and the Grade II listed Battersea Reference Library.

The flatter central section of the road, at the top of the hill, includes approximately 15 estate agents (including Courtenay, Winkworth and Foxtons), as well as Lavender Hill police station (the main police station for the Battersea area) and the Battersea Arts Centre. There is a concentration of restaurants and bars along the central section.

The eastern end of the street is anchored by smaller branches of Sainsbury's and Tesco at the crossroads with Queenstown Road. It includes a wide variety of restaurants and bars, helped by wide pavements that provide outdoor seating. There are also clusters of shops from sectors including cycling, music equipment, interior design, decorators merchants, and contemporary furniture. This section of the road is dominated by independent businesses with relatively few national operators (with the exception of a few cafes such as Caffè Nero).

In 2011, Wandsworth Borough Council completed the first phase of the Clapham Junction Exemplar project, which extensively de-cluttered and upgraded the streetscape of the western part of Lavender Hill to make it a more attractive and welcoming retail environment. This included widening of pavements, new street lighting, safer pedestrian crossings, and extensive use of granite paving.

===== Business =====
Although primarily residential, Lavender Hill includes significant office space, notably at the Battersea Business Centre, which provides workspace for around 140 businesses in a converted Victorian paper mill at 99-109 Lavender Hill.

The area around Lavender Hill included a small proportion of industrial land use (including the area now occupied by the Asda supermarket which was originally a rail yard). Some small sites continued into the early 2000s (with manufacturers such as Rotoplas precision engineering on Stormont Road); however, almost all industrial land has been converted to residential development as the area has gentrified.

===== Residential =====
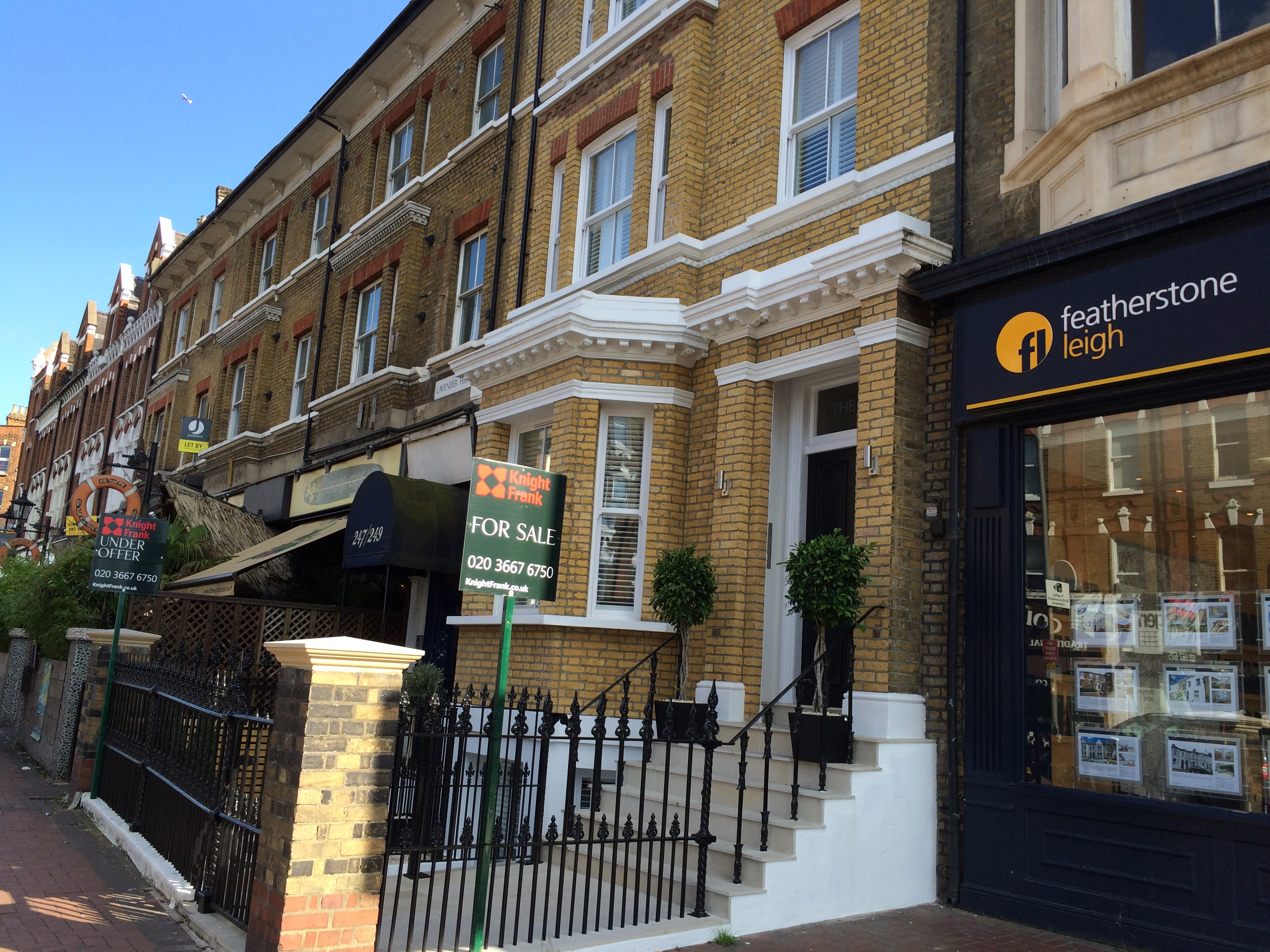
Lavender Hill's more residential past is still visible: here, a house is sandwiched between a bar and an estate agent

Lavender Hill is in the centre of a high density middle class residential neighbourhood, of predominantly Victorian architecture, including the large Shaftesbury Park Estate.

There is a Travelodge hotel on Falcon Lane close to the western end of Lavender Hill, and a new Premier Inn has been constructed near the eastern end of Lavender Hill (in a former Temperance Hall at the junction with Wandsworth Road).

==== Transport ====
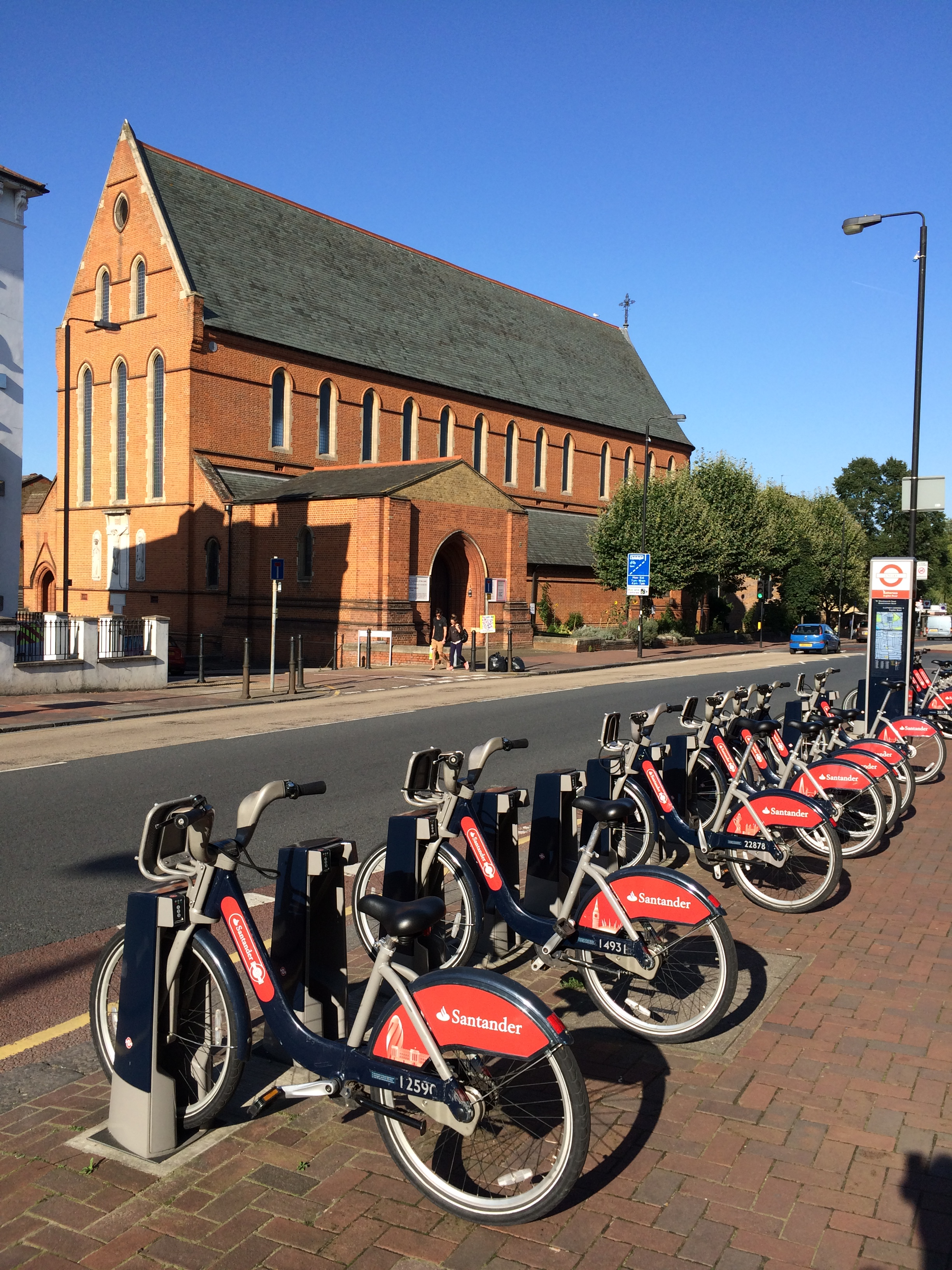
One of Lavender Hill's cycle hire docking points, in front of the Church of the Ascension

Lavender Hill has a Public transport accessibility level of 5 along most of its length, rising to the highest level of 6b at its western end, indicating a high density of public transport.

Transport at the western end of Lavender Hill is dominated by Clapham Junction railway station, one of the busiest in Europe. The eastern end is an approximately ten-minute walk from several smaller stations, notably Wandsworth Road railway station, Clapham Common Underground station and Queenstown Road railway station.

In the 1890s Lavender Hill was developed as a major tram route, with tram route 26 running along Lavender Hill on the way from Kew Bridge to London Bridge, and route 28 running from Harrow Road to Victoria. The tram lines were removed in the early 1950s and replaced by several bus services (currently including the 77, 87 and 156 buses). These services still follow the same route between Wandsworth and Vauxhall, and Lavender Hill has an eastbound bus lane along much of its length.

There are three Santander Cycles public cycle hire docking stations on or close to Lavender Hill (on Dorothy Road at the western end, on Lavender Hill itself close to the junction with Sugden Road, and on Ashley Crescent at the eastern end).

==== Safety ====
- On 10 August 2017, a 77 bus left the road and collided with a shopfront on the street, injuring 10 people. The driver was described as having lost consciousness at the time of the crash.

==== Notable people ====
- Catherine Gurney, OBE, (1848–1930), activist
- Jonathan Jack Whicher, Detective, (1814–1881): one of Scotland Yard's original eight Detectives. Died at 2, Cumberland Villas, Lavender Hill.
- Stereo MC's, musicians

=== St John's Hill ===
The A3 follows roughly the same southwesterly course as this route and after St John's Hill, Clapham Junction, the two routes merge at the Wandsworth one-way system (51.4596°N 0.1799°W), where the road continues as the A3.
