= Northcote Road =

Street in Battersea, London

Coordinates: 51.457°N 0.165°W

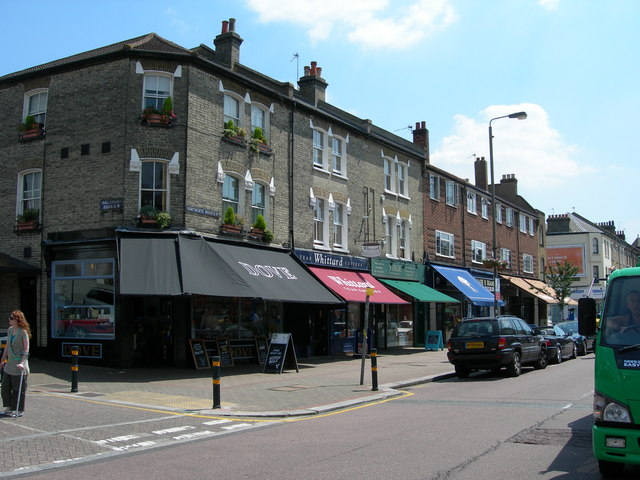
Northcote Road

Northcote Road is a shopping street In Battersea, south London, which stretches over half a mile. It is close to Clapham Junction station.

It is the epicentre of the so-called 'Nappy Valley', named because of the young, affluent and productive demographic and also because the road lies over a culverted stream (the Falconbrook) giving it a low-lying position between the two commons of Wandsworth and Clapham (rising to the west and east respectively).

As well as many cafes and shops, Northcote Road has an historic food market which dates back to the 1860s, as well as the indoor Northcote Road Antiques Market. However, as with the vast majority of street markets, Northcote Road is a mere shadow of itself, being much smaller size, and more specialised in what its stalls offer, reflecting the changing demographics of the local area.

The Northcote Road seems to have been named after Stafford Northcote, 1st Earl of Iddesleigh. The precise reason and date of this is difficult to confirm.
