= River Heathwall =

Covered river in London, England

Coordinates: 51.483°N 0.136°W

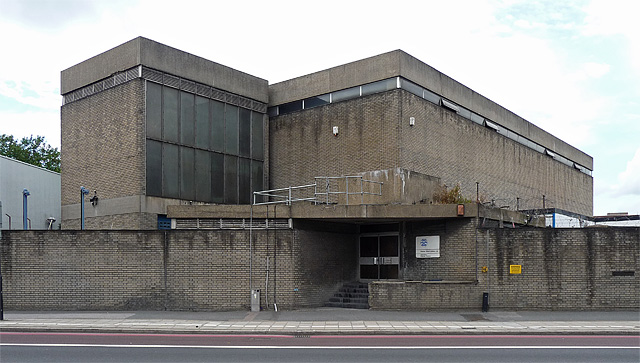
- Heathwall Pumping Station, Nine Elms Lane

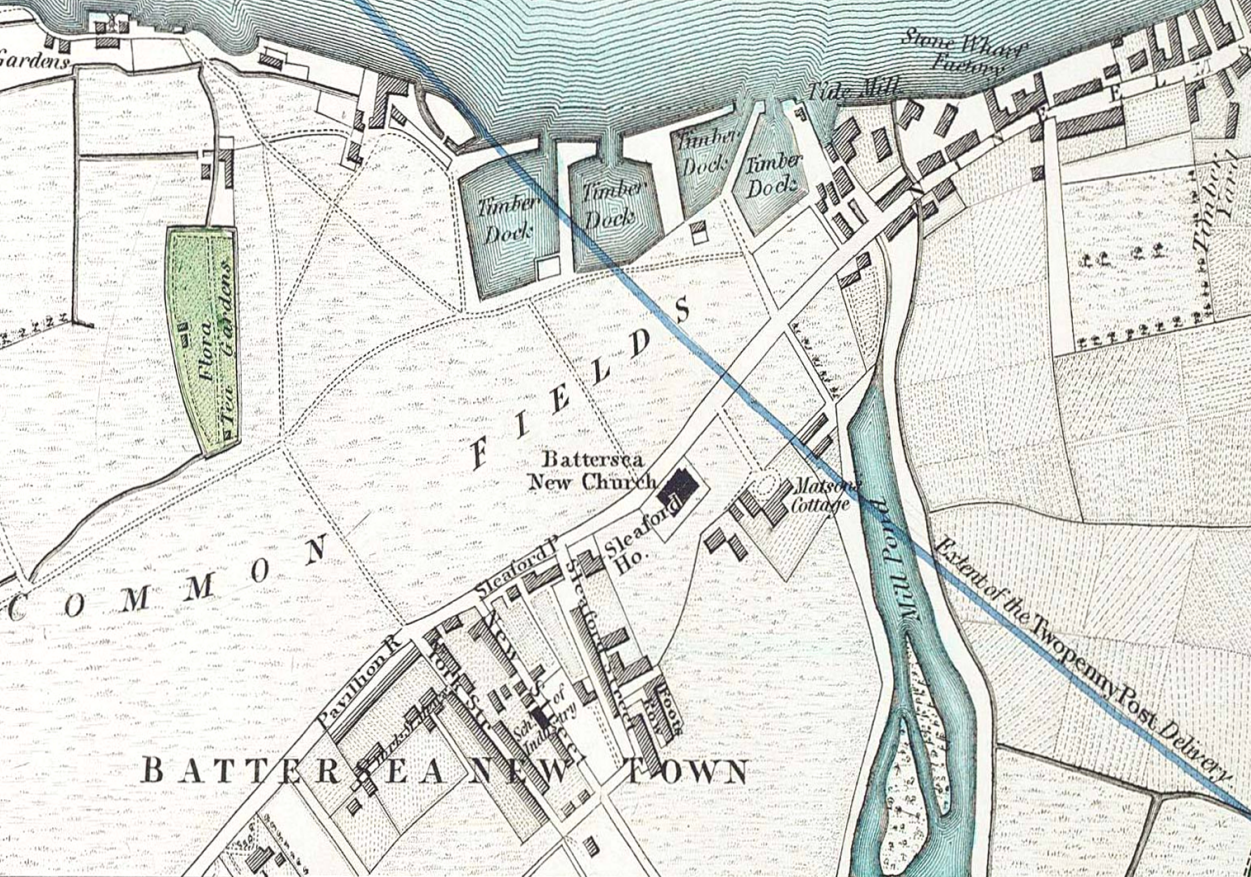
- 1830 map of Battersea, showing a Mill Pond (bottom right) fed by the River Heathwall, where it goes to join the Thames

Basin features
- River system: Thames Basin

The River Heathwall, more often known as the Heathwall Sewer, Heathwall Ditch or Heathwall Mill Pond was a set of field drainage ditches and a large mill pond in Battersea, London. It had two outlets into the tidal Thames and its inland section roughly followed Wandsworth Road. Its eastern outlet was at Nine Elms.

The Greenwoods' map of 1827 confirms the mill pond served a tide mill, harnessing of the locally great tidal energy. The generic prototype may have such a mill in the nascent City of London, in Roman Britain.

The river was covered in 1866, as was the nearby Falconbrook. Pumping stations were added for the drainage of northern Battersea and to allow for widespread development. Heathwall Pumping Station is now part of the Thames Tideway Scheme.
