= Northcote Road Antiques Market =

Market in England

Coordinates: 51.455291°N 0.164391°W

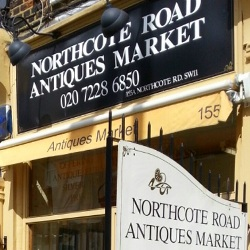
Northcote Road Antiques Market

Northcote Road Antique Market is a large indoor market located at 155a Northcote Road, Battersea in London, England. It houses over thirty dealers selling antiques, vintage, retro, and collectables.

The shop opened in 1986. In 2009, it was listed as one of the best 50 markets to visit by The Independent.
