= The Falcon, Battersea =

Listed pub in London, England

The Falcon
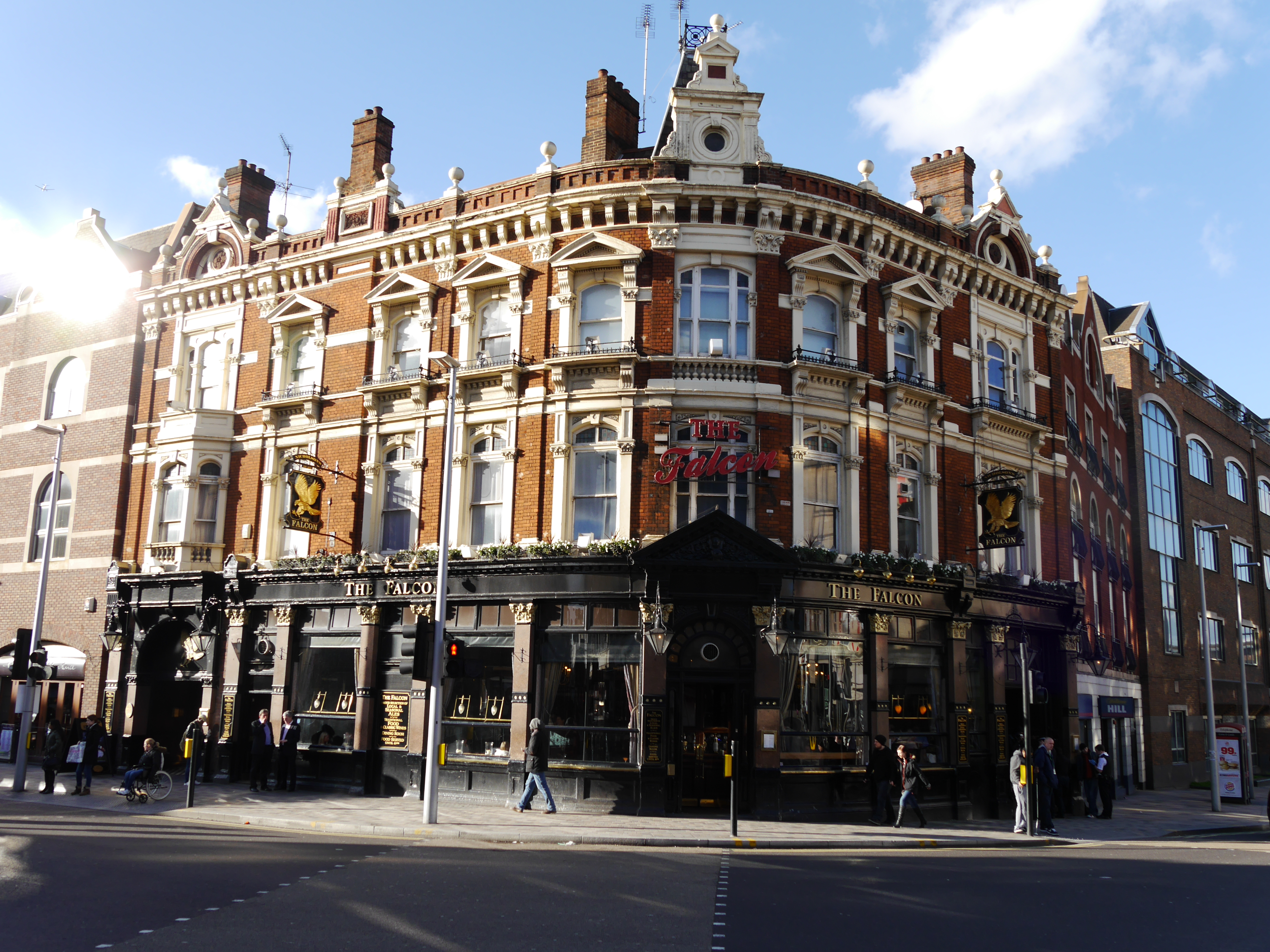
- The pub in 2014

- Location within London Borough of Wandsworth Location within Greater London
- Alternative names: Falcon Hotel

General information
- Type: Public house
- Location: 2 St John's Hill, Battersea, London, England
- Coordinates: 51.46383°N 0.16798°W
- Year built: 1882–1883; 143 years ago
- Owner: Mitchells & Butlers

Design and construction
- Designations

Listed Building – Grade II
- Official name: Falcon Hotel public house
- Designated: 10 December 1974
- Reference no.: 1065487

Website
- Official website

The Falcon is a Grade II listed public house on St John's Hill in Battersea, London, England. Although an inn on the site is recorded from 1733 and may be older, the present building was erected in 1882–83. Its interior is included on the Campaign for Real Ale (CAMRA)'s National Inventory of Historic Pub Interiors and contains a 125-foot (38 m) curved bar counter described by CAMRA as the longest in Britain.

== History ==
The Manor of Battersea was owned from about 1613 to 1763 by the St John baronets of Lydiard Tregoze, who later became the Bolingbroke viscounts. The supporters of the St John family's armorial bearings were a falcon wings displayed Or, or, more plainly, a pair of golden falcons with wings outspread. The Falcon inn is thought to have derived its name from this heraldic device.

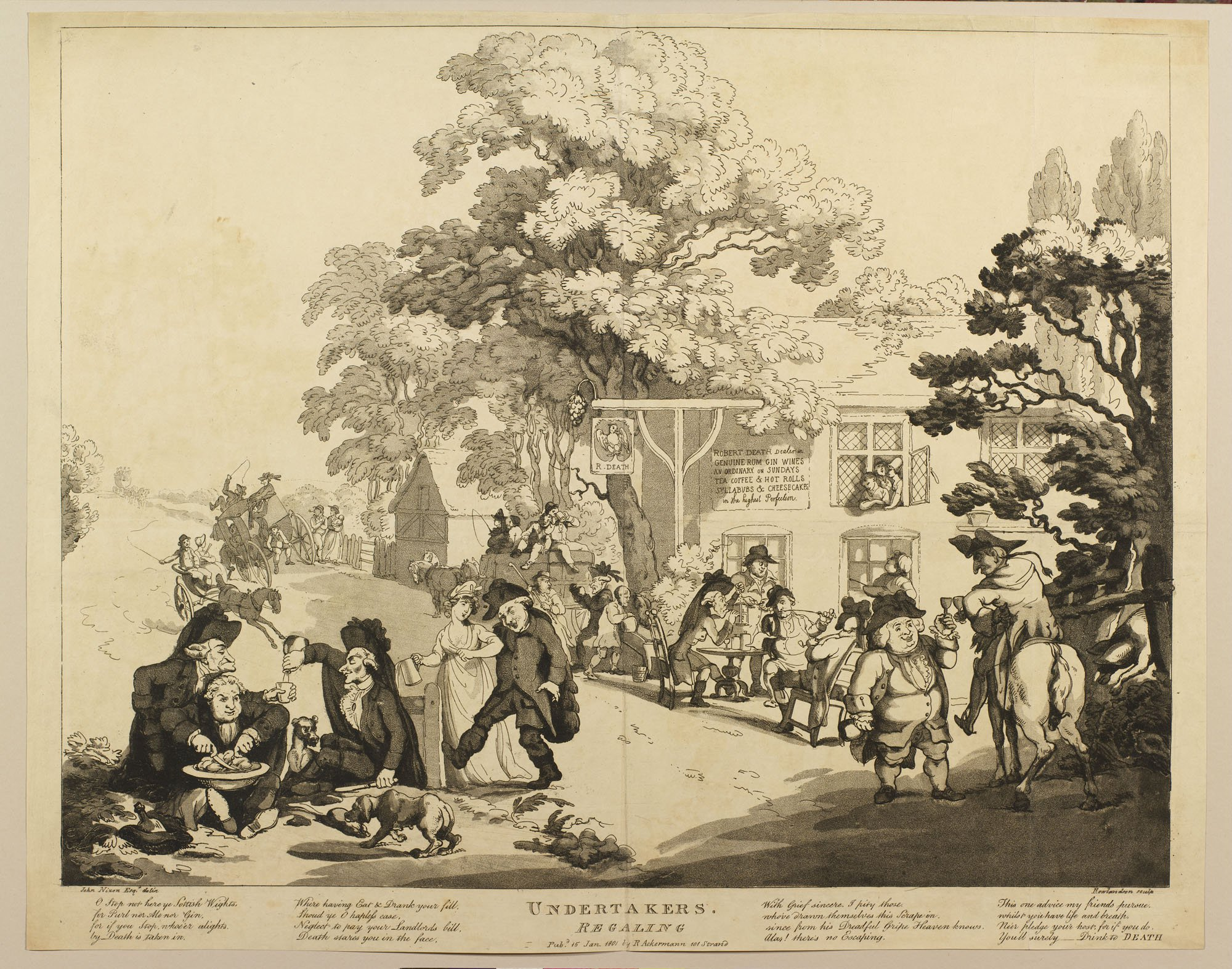
Undertakers Regaling 1801 etching after a caricature by John Nixon depicting The Falcon and playing on the surname of the then landlord, Robert Death. Undertakers revel around the inn while carriages travelling up and down the hill in the background appear to be in danger

The Survey of London identifies the earliest known record of The Falcon as dating from 1733, although it suggests that an inn of that name had existed for some time before then. An 1882 publication on Battersea claimed that part of the Falcon Tavern dated back 275 years. From 1717, The Falcon stood on the Southwark-to-Kingston turnpike, beside a ford over the Hydeburn brook, later known as the Falconbrook, and at the foot of St John's Hill and Lavender Hill. Its former rural setting is depicted in a circa 1801 caricature by John Nixon, accompanied by comic verse written in 1785 by Edward Trapp Pilgrim, both of which played on the surname of the then landlord, Robert Death.

The inn was extended sometime after 1835 and refronted in brick by the then landlord, John Alder. During the 1870s and 1880s, the area around The Falcon was developed into the terraced streetscape that largely survives today. Alfred Heaver, one of the principal developers of the area, with the assistance of the Wandsworth District Board of Works, created St John's Road as a wide, straight thoroughfare from what had previously been little more than a farm track. The Falcon occupied a prominent position at the junction of St John's Road and St John's Hill as both developed into shopping streets. The landlord, John Tavener, entered into an arrangement with the developer George Nathaniel Street under which land was exchanged to facilitate the rebuilding of The Falcon. As a result, the inn was relocated in 1882–83 to the curved corner of the crossroads and rebuilt in its present form by R. & H. Pickersgill.

J.F.B., writing in the 1 December 1883 edition of Notes and Queries, lamented the loss of the old Falcon Inn and other historic inns in London and elsewhere:

"Its appearance was very picturesque, standing in the hollow at the corner of St John's Hill and Falcon Road. Being the last stage into London on the high road from Portsmouth, many travellers must know it. The old wych-elm, with a cupboard made of its hollow trunk, and a door hanging on old fashioned rusty hinges, was a striking feature; but the landlord would not 'spare that tree' and it has been grubbed up by the roots. The builder has choked up the well and poured concrete on the sward ... a modern gin-palace will take the place of a low-pitched old tavern with a cross-beamed taproom and a quaint doorway before which a maypole might have been reared..."

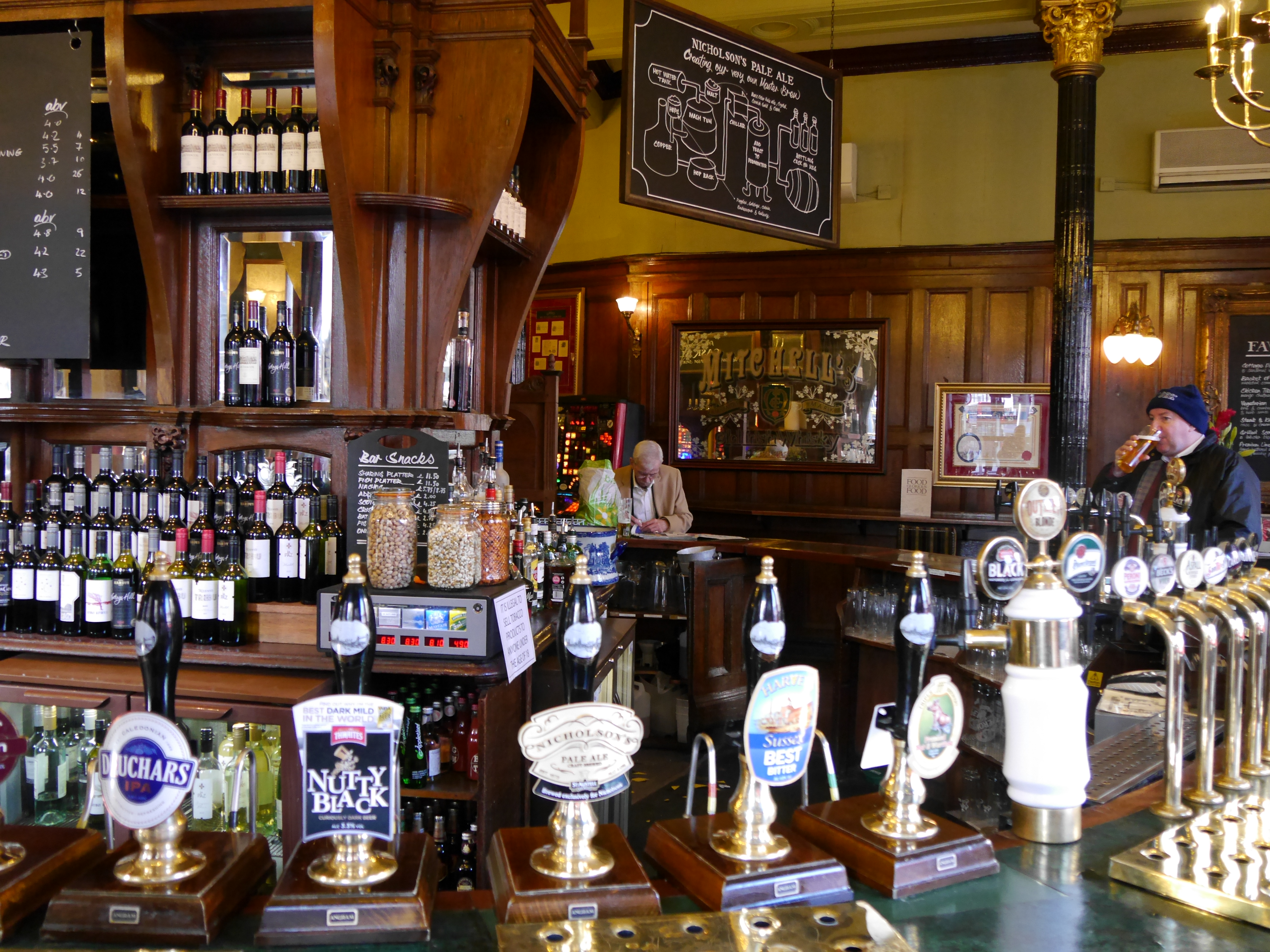
Interior of The Falcon in 2014, displaying some of Turtle & Appleton's 1896 work

Reopened as The Falcon Hotel, the building is described by the Survey of London as a "robust piece of London pub architecture in the Franco-Italianate taste", built in brick with cement dressings and featuring an ornamental turret above the corner gable. The pub's interior was remodelled in 1896 by the builders Turtle & Appleton, who created an open-plan arrangement through the use of cast-iron columns to support the upper floor and introduced elaborate oak joinery and glass panels depicting scenes from the inn's history. A billiard room was added to the rear of the hotel in 1901 by Tavener's widow. Tavener's venture appears to have been commercially successful, and by 1911 the hotel employed around 20 people. In 1921, Tavener's son, also named John, sold the business to the Wenlock Brewery for £70,000.

On 10 December 1974, the Falcon Hotel was designated a Grade II listed building. It was included on the Campaign for Real Ale (CAMRA)'s National Inventory of Historic Pub Interiors before the inventory's grading system was revised. Under the revised scheme, it is rated three stars and its interior is regarded as being "of outstanding national historic importance".

The pub's curved bar counter, measuring around 125 feet (38 m), is described by CAMRA as the longest in Britain. As of June 2026 the freehold was owned by Mitchells & Butlers, and the pub operated under its Nicholson's brand.

== Architecture ==
=== Exterior ===
The building occupies a continuous frontage along both streets and is arranged over three storeys with an attic level. It is faced in red brick with stone decorative details and has a varied frontage divided into nine sections. The pub frontage at ground-floor level features stone and granite columns, with the principal entrance positioned on the rounded corner below a fanlight and a prominent ornamental canopy. Additional entrances are located at either end of the building.

The windows on the upper floors are framed with elaborate stone surrounds, while those on the second floor also have decorative stone hoods and iron railings. Large vertical stone features rise through the upper storeys and support a substantial cornice, above which is a brick parapet decorated with stone panels and ball finials. The roofline emphasises the three entrances, with shaped gables at each end and, above the corner entrance, a distinctive roof feature surrounded by an iron balcony and topped by a flagpole. Tall chimneys rise above the roofline.

=== Interior ===
The interior largely retains its late Victorian character and is arranged in three principal sections: a large main bar, a small screened private bar, and a rear room originally associated with dining. The central servery is dominated by a long curved counter, reputedly one of the longest surviving pub bars in Britain. An exceptionally tall bar-back with etched mirrors survives at the centre of the servery, while cast-iron columns with decorative capitals support the interior.

Original features include terrazzo flooring, extensive timber panelling, etched and frosted glass screens, stained glass, and carved woodwork. A former billiard room retains ornate panelling and a substantial fireplace surround. Among the most distinctive features is a stained-glass window depicting earlier and later versions of the pub and scenes connected with its history. The private bar survives with its timber-and-glass partitioning, while stained-glass panels and decorative glazing remain throughout the building.

== See also ==
- List of pubs in London
