= Ada Florence Kinton =

British-Canadian artist and educator

Ada Florence Kinton (April 1, 1859 – May 27, 1905) was an English-born Canadian artist, educator, Salvation Army officer and newspaper editor.

== Biography ==
The daughter of John Louis Kinton, a college teacher, and Sarah Curtis Mackie, both Methodists, Kinton was born in Battersea in London. After completing high school, she attended art school, receiving an art master's certificate. Kinton taught art at a ladies' boarding school in England and then took a postgraduate course at the South Kensington School of Art. In 1883, she met General William Booth, founder of the Salvation Army. In 1886, she went to Canada and taught art in Kingston and then Toronto. In 1889, Kinton joined the Salvation Army in Toronto. She worked in various Salvation Army institutions such as the Drunkard's Home, the Children's Shelter and the Rescue Home for Women. In 1892, she became associate editor for the Canadian edition of The War Cry. Kinton wrote articles for the paper and also produced illustrations.

In 1891, she became a captain in the Salvation Army. In 1893, she was asked by the new Canadian leader Herbert Booth to act as private secretary for his wife; her duties also included looking after the Booth children. While travelling with the Booths in Australia, she developed tuberculosis. After resting with her sister in Huntsville, she resumed travel with the Booths in the United States. She suffered a relapse in 1903 and returned to Huntsville.

She died in Huntsville at the age of 46.

In 1907, her autobiography Just One Blue Bonnet: the Life Story of Ada Florence Kinton, artist and salvationist was published with her sister Sara Amelia (Kinton) Randleson as editor.
