= Falconbrook =

Covered river in London, England

Coordinates: 51°27′50″N 0°10′04″W

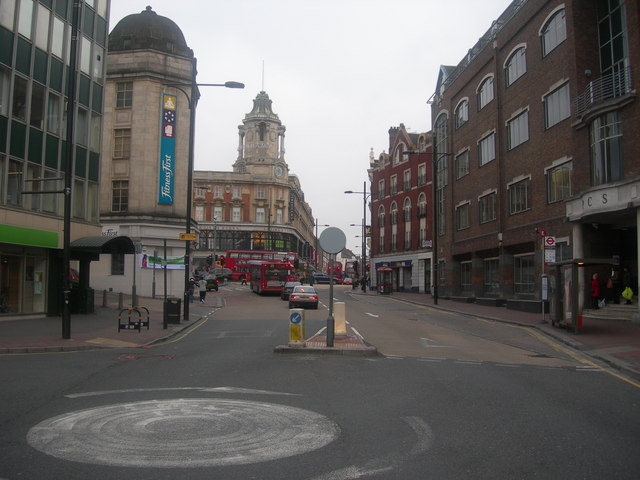
Modern-day Falcon Road, looking south towards The Falcon public house. The main successor, a combined sewer, runs under the manhole on the left.

The Falconbrook was a stream that rose in Balham and Tooting, draining much of those parishes then the south and west of the larger district of Battersea including Clapham Junction to enter the London reaches of the Thames. Before doing so, it briefly formed the border of Wandsworth Town, reflected in the SW11/SW18 boundary today.

The river was culverted in the 1860s and has become an important combined sewer. In 2007, heavy rain caused this to flood, to low but still property-damaging depth, at Falcon Road near Clapham Junction station.

== Course ==
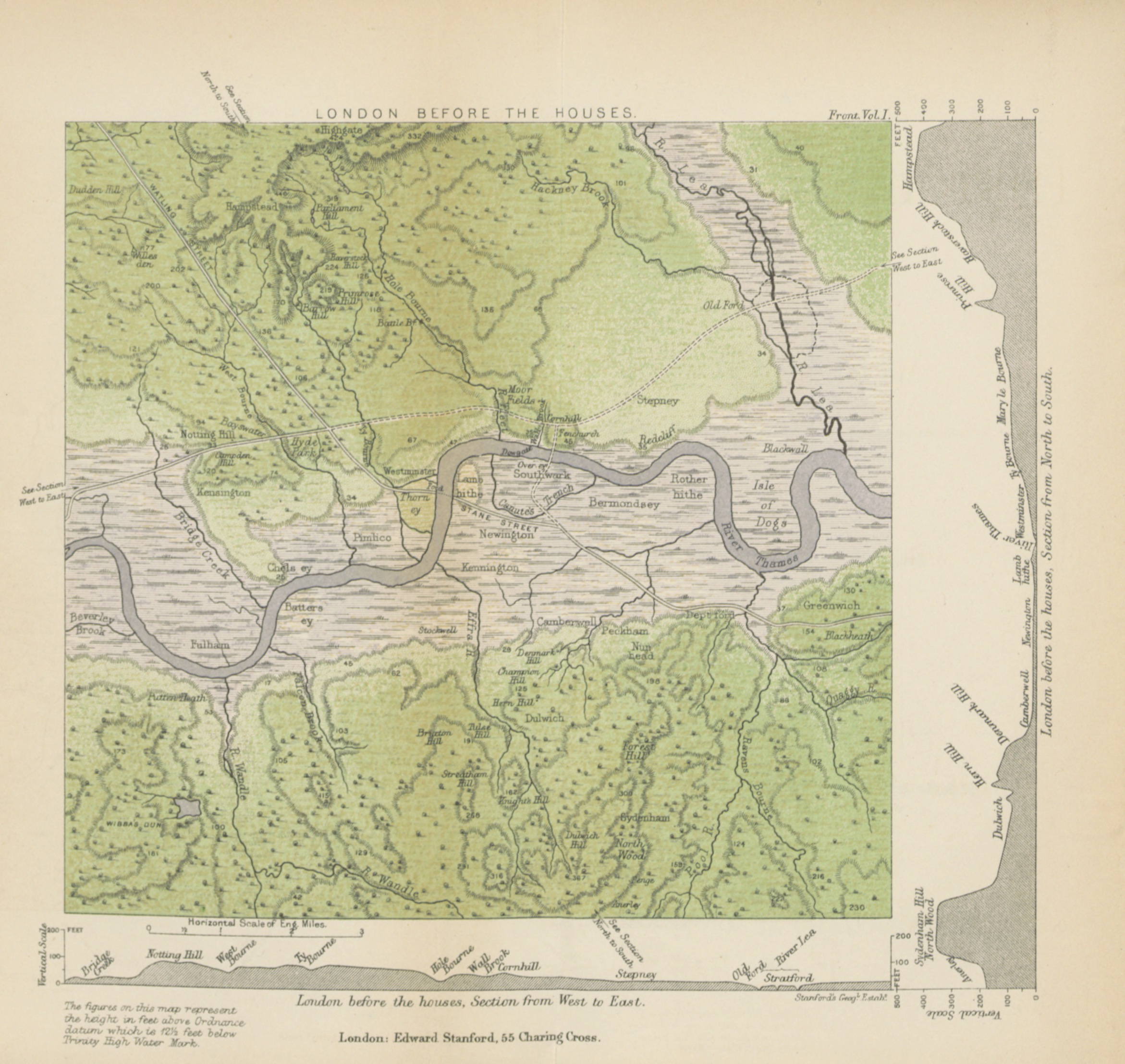
Plate from "A History of London", by W.E. Loftie, 1884, titled London Before the Houses, showing the Falconbrook.
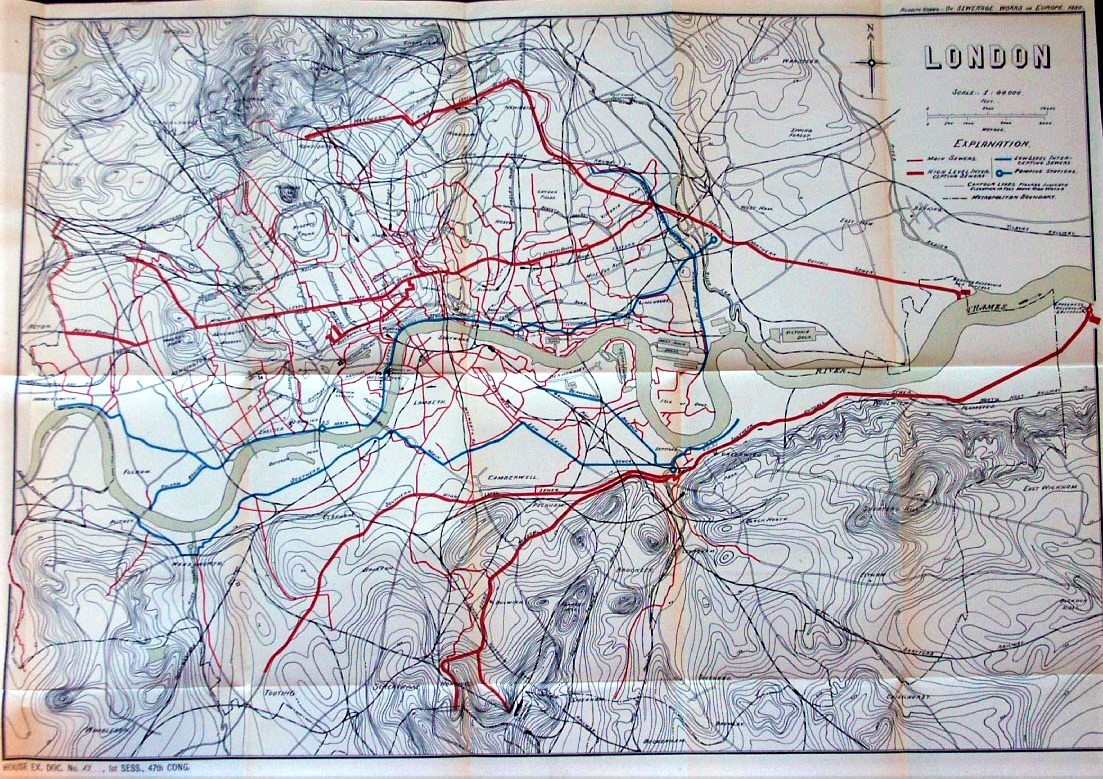
Hering's Sewerage in Europe map of 1882 (excerpt). Click for broader map and to enable varied magnification. The route of the replaced stream is two lateral sewers partly for treated discharge via the S.LLS (blue) but otherwise for taking storm combined sewerage from the Southern High Level sewer to the Tideway which can take weeks to flow out to sea entirely, and so overwhelmingly into the supersewer the Thames Tideway Tunnel from 2025.

The Falconbrook, once a southwest London brook has been slightly replaced by surface water drains. Mainly, however, its course forms a gentle valley with an occasional colloquial name and hosts a mid-Victorian solution to the then extent of urbanisation. When London's later growth is considered this solution, a combined sewer, leads to the Thames-side Southern Low Level Sewer in the London sewerage system which is insufficient when it rains (it overflows into the tidal Thames). To make this (and others) sufficient and account for its rainwater intake, the Thames Tideway Tunnel is expected to be complete in 2025.

The source of the Falconbrook was Streatham Hill, with an additional source to the west at Furzedown south of Tooting Bec Common. From its source the Falconbrook flowed west through Balham, then turned north one residential block before Wandsworth Common as it was joined by the Tooting Bec feeder and continues to carve a ravine which is formed by St John's Road and Northcote Road in Battersea Rise. Springs feeding the first drain underneath the foundations of a row of shops (numbers 2–36 Streatham High Road, the A23 road). During their construction, extra access space was built below the basement floors to accommodate the springs when in full spate. The brook flowed (and now sewer flows) along Drewstead Road, past Woodfield Avenue, passed through the north of Tooting Bec Common, north down Cavendish Road (passing Weir Road), west along the approximate line of Kenilford Road, along Oldridge Road, turned north by Holy Ghost School, west of Rusham and Montholme Road and along Northcote Road, 8-11m AOD. After St John's Road it flowed along Falcon Road, Battersea just before its end turned west emptying in the tidal Thames west of Lombard Road and north of the London Heliport. This point is the western corner of Battersea, on the border with Wandsworth Town; the rest of the shared border runs along the top of the valley's western side.

== Names and etymology ==
The earliest recorded name for the brook was the Hyde Burn or Hydebourne, appearing as Hydaburn or Hidaburn in Cartularium Saxonicum defining grants of land in Battersea made in 693 and 695. This name may be related to Hyde Farm adjacent to Toooting Bec Common in Clapham, lying north and east of the brook, and the name thought to relate to the "Hide of land in Balham..." (a direct translation) in a grant of land made to Bec Abbey towards the end of the 11th century.

From the mid-15th century through to the 19th century, the river was known as the York Brook or York Sewer, the name derived from York House, property of the Archbishops of York, which stood at the confluence with the Thames. The feeder stream from Tooting Bec Common was similarly sometimes recorded as the York Ditch.

The Manor of Battersea was owned from about 1627 to 1763 by the St John baronets, of Lydiard Tregoze, who latterly became the Bolingbroke Viscounts. The supporters of the armorial bearings of the St John family were a falcon wings displayed Or, or, more plainly, a pair of golden falcons displaying their wings. The Falcon brook and similarly named features in the locality - Falcon Park, Falcon Road, "The Falcons" housing estate, the Falcon pub, and the Falconbrook Primary school. - have names derived from this display of heraldry. At the time of the culverting of the river, both Falconbrook and York Sewer names were in concurrent use.

== Soil ==
Falconbrook's catchment basin, unlike longer tributaries such as the Lea and Wandle, is entirely based on impermeable to semi-impermeable London Clay. It starts north of areas with remaining Lambeth Group and North Downs topsoil.

== Flooding ==
Ponding of the "Falcon Brook" has been recorded as early as 1745. An entirely London Clay catchment basin and flatter lower course through Battersea was, before urbanization, a major factor contributing to the stream's overflow. Some separate surface water and sewerage systems are in place and are sufficient to drain many parks, roofs and roads in an attempt to intercept the sewerage system before polluting the Tideway. A further interceptor pipe the Thames Tideway Scheme is expected to be completed by 2025 to avoid overflow.

Thames Water carried out work at the end of 2006 to resolve the flooding of the Falconbrook sewer in the north of Balham, involving a series of road closures.

In July 2007, in response to heavy rainfall due to its vale's hard surfaces including roofing relying on it so heavily as a combined sewer, the Falconbrook sewer overflowed on more than one pavement and road, including Falcon Road by Clapham Junction, during those floods. Since then, five flood events in the local Critical Drainage Area (7/21) have occurred.

== See also ==
- Tributaries of the River Thames
- List of rivers in England

| Next confluence upstream | River Thames | Next confluence downstream |
| River Wandle (south) | Falconbrook | Counter's Creek (north) |
