= Nappy Valley =

Colloquial epithet

Nappy Valley is a colloquial epithet applied to pleasant places with high (demographic) reproduction.

It resonates linguistically with Happy Valley such as that in Kenya, noted for its wealthy white population before 1963 independence where much of the film White Mischief is set. It also linguistically tied to Napa Valley a successful wine region of California.

== Battersea, SW11, London, England ==
The term is applied to south Battersea, between Clapham Common and Wandsworth Common, South West London with a "café culture" of middle-class, affluent families. Its focal Northcote Road runs along the foot of a small vale, that of the Falconbrook. The street is labelled 'Nappy Valley' by Will Self in his February 2010 London Review of Books Diary entry.

== Tuggeranong Valley, Australian Capital Territory ==
Tuggeranong is the southernmost town centre of Canberra, the capital city of Australia. It comprises 19 suburbs with a total of 31,819 dwellings, housing 87,119 people of the 324,034 people in the Territory (2006 Census). The district occupies 117 square kilometres (45 sq mi) to the east of the Murrumbidgee River. On 21 February 1973, its building began of one third of the new towns for Canberra – these, per planning of 1969, to house from 180,000 to 220,000 people. The first families moved into the suburb of Kambah the next year. The new town centre, composed largely of young families, soon became known locally as "nappy valley".
