= Nappy Creek =

Stream in Nome Census Area, Alaska, U.S.

Coordinates: 65°03′00″N 163°41′00″W

Nappy Creek is a stream in Nome Census Area, Alaska, in the United States.

Nappy Creek was likely named by prospectors in or before the year 1901.

== See also ==
- List of rivers of Alaska
