= Winkworth plc =

International estate agent

Winkworth PLC
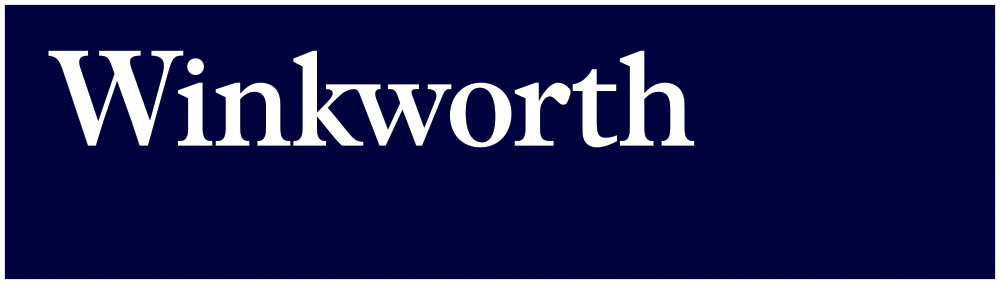

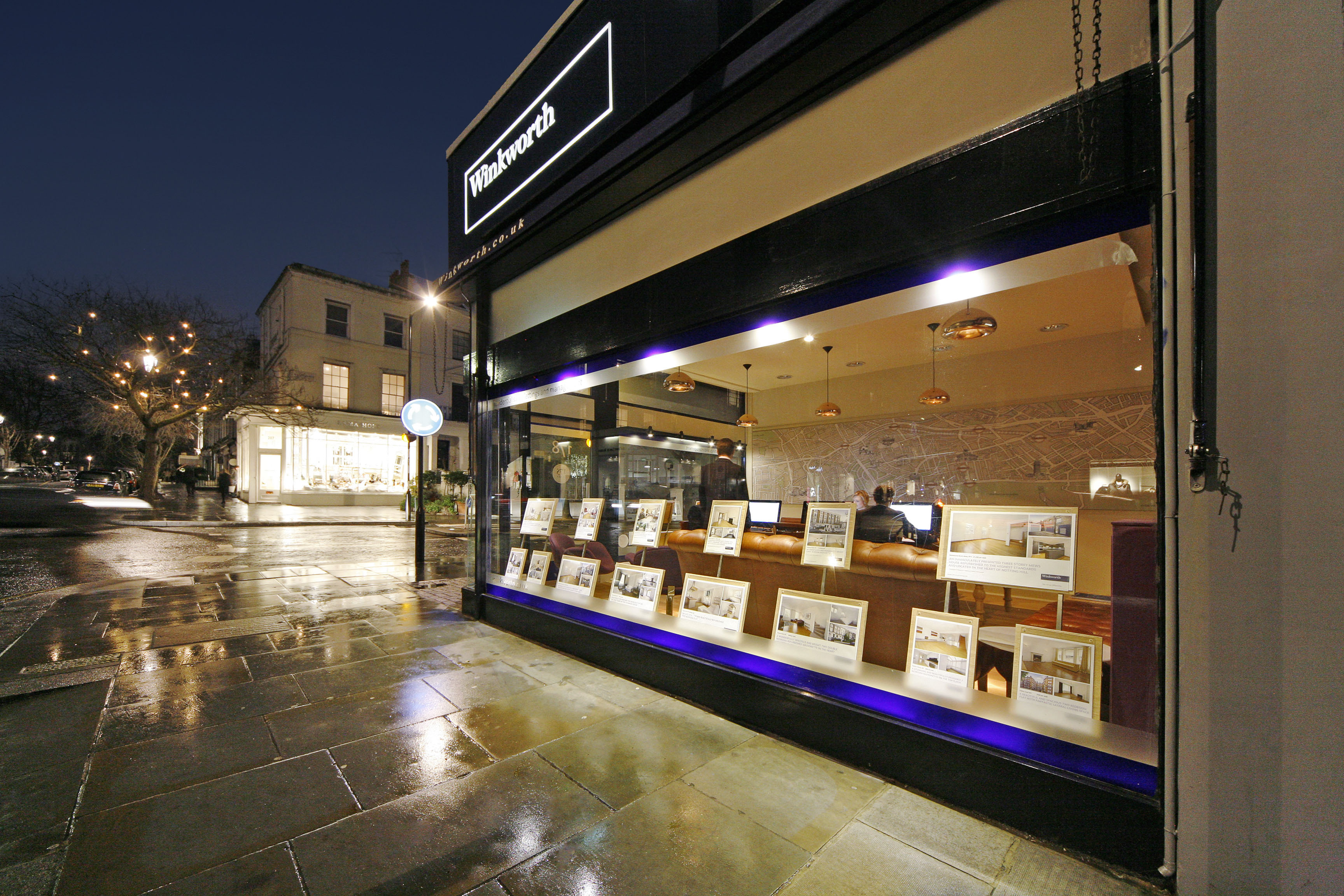
- Winkworth Notting Hill office, London
- Type: Public
- Industry: Estate agency; Franchising
- Founded: 1835 in London, England
- Founder: Henry Winkworth
- Headquarters: 80 Strand, London, WC2R 0DT, England
- Number of locations: 103 franchised offices
- Area served: UK
- Key people: Dominic Agace (CEO); Andrew Nicols (CFO); Tara Tan (COO); Simon Agace (Chair)
- Services: Estate agency services Franchising opportunities
- Number of employees: Network Approx. 800 / Franchising - 25 (2026)
- Website: https://www.winkworth.co.uk/

Winkworth plc is a British estate agency franchisor headquartered in London. Founded in 1835, it is one of the United Kingdom's oldest estate agency businesses and operates a nationwide network of independently owned franchise offices specialising in residential sales, lettings and property management. The company has been listed on the Alternative Investment Market (AIM) of the London Stock Exchange under the ticker symbol WINK since 2009.

== History ==
Winkworth was founded in London in 1835 and is one of the oldest established estate agency businesses in the United Kingdom.

The company was acquired by Simon Agace in 1974. Under his leadership, Winkworth expanded its London presence and, in 1981, became the first estate agency business in the United Kingdom to adopt a franchising model

The franchise model facilitated expansion beyond London into regional markets across England during the 1980s and 1990s.

In 2009, Winkworth plc was admitted to trading on AIM to support further expansion of its franchise network

By the mid-2020s, Winkworth operated a network of more than 100 offices, including over 60 locations in London.

In 2025, the company marked its 190th anniversary

=== Key Milestones ===
- Henry Winkworth established an estate agency on Curzon Street in Mayfair in 1835.
- The firm also operated a country branch in Brighton.
- In 1893, Henry St. John Winkworth acquired the agency and lent the family name to the business.
- Henry Dixon Winkworth later took over and became the last family member to run the business.
- The company was sold to Mann & Co. in 1967.
- By 1980 the business had expanded to eight offices.
- By 2004 the network had grown to 25 offices.
- International offices operated in France and Portugal at the time of the AIM flotation.
- A Marbella office was opened by 2016.
- Client Services (2014), Corporate Relocations (2015), Recruitment (2017) and Land & New Homes (2019) departments were established.

== Operations ==
Winkworth operates as a franchisor of residential estate agencies. Its network provides residential sales, lettings and property management services throughout the United Kingdom.

The company also offers commercial property services through specialist divisions and franchisees receive operational support including marketing, technology and compliance services.

== Franchise Model ==
Winkworth operates a franchise-based business model in which individual offices are owned and managed by local franchisees while operating under the Winkworth brand.

The company is widely credited with introducing estate agency franchising to the United Kingdom in 1981.

The franchisor provides support services including training, marketing, technology and compliance assistance.

== Leadership ==
Simon Agace serves as Non-Executive Chairman and acquired the business in 1974.

Dominic Agace became Chief Executive Officer in 2006 and led the company's expansion and AIM admission.

Andrew Nicol has served as CFO since 2016 and Company Secretary since 2024. Tara Tan was appointed COO in 2024.
