= Battersea =

District in London, England

Coordinates: 51.470°N 0.164°W

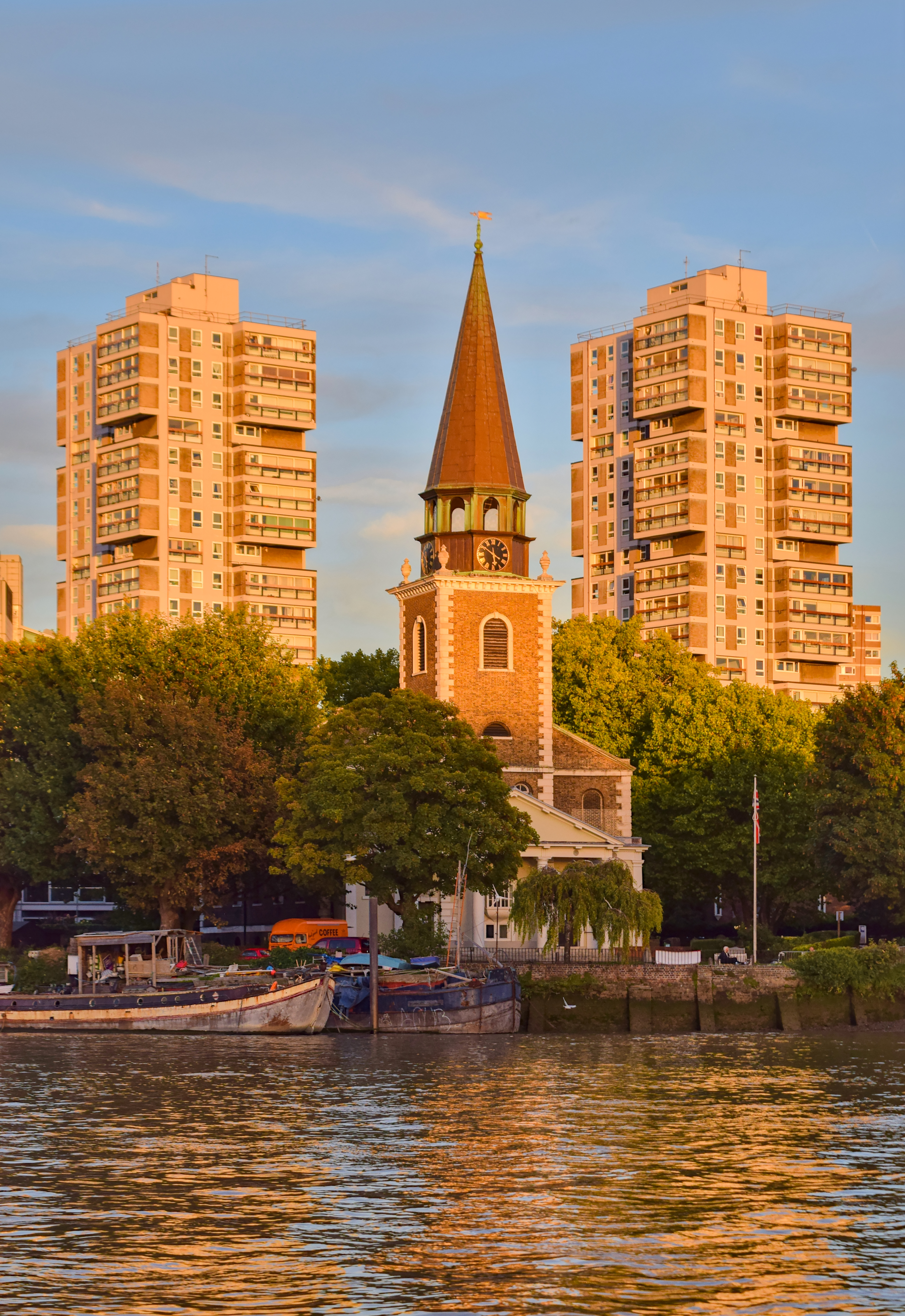
- St Mary's Church and tower blocks in Battersea

- Location within Greater London
- Population: 73,345 (2011 census)
- OS grid reference: TQ2776
- London borough: Wandsworth
- Ceremonial county: Greater London
- Region: London
- Country: England
- Sovereign state: United Kingdom
- Post town: LONDON
- Postcode district: SW8, SW11
- Dialling code: 020
- Police: Metropolitan
- Fire: London
- Ambulance: London
- UK Parliament: Battersea
- London Assembly: Merton and Wandsworth

Battersea is a large district in South London, part of the London Borough of Wandsworth, England. It is centred 3.5 miles (5.6 km) southwest of Charing Cross and also extends along the south bank of the Thames Tideway. It includes the 200-acre (0.81 km^{2}) Battersea Park.

== History ==
Battersea is mentioned in the few surviving Anglo-Saxon geographical accounts as Badrices īeg, 'Badric's Island' and later Old English: Patrisey. As with many former parishes beside tidal flood plains the lowest land was reclaimed for agriculture by draining marshland and building culverts for streams. By the side of this was the Heathwall tide mill in the north-east with a very long mill pond regularly draining and filling to the south.

Battersea (Middle English: Patricesy) appears in the Domesday Book of 1086 in Surrey within the hundred of Brixton (Middle English: Bricsistan) as a vast manor held by St Peter's Abbey, Westminster. Its Domesday assets were: 18 hides and 17 ploughlands of cultivated land; 7 mills worth £42 9s 8d per year, 82 acres (33 ha) of meadow, woodland worth 50 hogs. It rendered (in total): £75 9s 8d. Price inflation was close to zero in the 11th and 12th centuries, so netting an annual income of £75 9s 8d would be equivalent to £133,000 in 2025.

St Mary's Church, completed in 1777, hosted the marriage of William Blake and Catherine Boucher in 1782. Benedict Arnold, his wife Peggy Shippen, and their daughter were buried in the crypt of the church.

Battersea Park, a 200-acre (0.81 km^{2}) northern rectangle by the Thames, was landscaped and founded for public use in 1858. Amenities and leisure buildings have been added to it since.

Until 1889, the parish of Battersea was part of the county of Surrey. In that year a new County of London came into being and the parish was made part of it.

=== Agriculture ===
Before the Industrial Revolution, much of the large parish was farmland, providing food for the City of London and surrounding population centres; and with particular specialisms, such as growing lavender on Lavender Hill (nowadays denoted by the road of the same name), asparagus (sold as "Battersea Bundles") or pig breeding on Pig Hill (later the site of the Shaftesbury Park Estate). At the end of the 18th century, above 300 acres (1.2 km^{2}) of land in the parish of Battersea were occupied by some 20 market gardeners, who rented from five to near 60 acres (24 ha) each. Villages in the wider area: Wandsworth, Earlsfield (hamlet of Garratt), Tooting, Balham – were separated by fields; in common with other suburbs the wealthy of London and the traditional manor successors built their homes in Battersea and neighbouring areas.

=== Industry ===
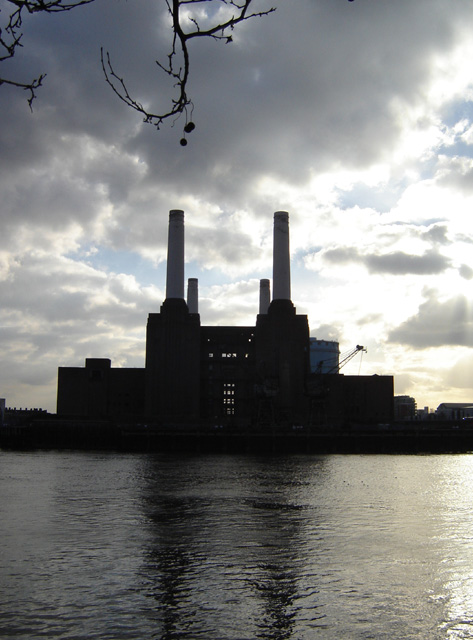
Battersea Power Station

Industry in the area was concentrated to the northwest just outside the Battersea-Wandsworth boundary, at the confluence of the River Thames and the River Wandle, which gave rise to the village of Wandsworth. This was settled from the 16th century by Protestant craftsmen – Huguenots – fleeing religious persecution in Europe, who planted lavender and gardens and established a range of industries such as mills, breweries and dyeing, bleaching and calico printing. Industry developed eastwards along the bank of the Thames during the Industrial Revolution from the 1750s onwards; the Thames provided water for transport, for steam engines and for water-intensive industrial processes. Bridges erected across the Thames encouraged growth; Putney Bridge, a mile to the west, was built in 1729 and rebuilt 1882, and Battersea Bridge in the centre of the north boundary in 1771. Inland from the river, the rural agricultural community persisted.

Along the Thames, a number of large and, in their field, pre-eminent firms grew; notably the Morgan Crucible company, which survives to this day and is listed on the London Stock Exchange; Price's Candles, which also made cycle lamp oil; oil refiner and paint manufacturer S. Bowley and Son; and Orlando Jones' Starch Factory. The 1874 Ordnance Survey map of the area shows the following factories, in order, from the site of the as yet unbuilt Wandsworth Bridge to Battersea Park: Starch manufacturer; Silk manufacturer; (St. John's College); (St. Mary's Church); Malt house; Corn mill; Oil and grease works (Prices Candles); Chemical works; Plumbago Crucible works (later the Morgan Crucible Company); Chemical works; Saltpetre works; Foundry. Between these were numerous wharfs for shipping.

In 1929, construction started on Battersea Power Station, being completed in 1939. From the late 18th century to comparatively recent times, Battersea was established as an industrial area with all of the issues associated with pollution and poor housing affecting it.

Industry declined and moved away from the area in the 1970s, and local government sought to address chronic post-war housing problems with large scale clearances and the establishment of planned housing. Some decades after the end of large scale local industry, resurgent demand among magnates and high income earners for parkside and riverside property close to planned Underground links has led to significant construction, Factories have been demolished and replaced with modern apartment buildings. Some of the council owned properties have been sold off and several traditional working men's pubs have become more fashionable bistros. Battersea neighbourhoods close to the railway have some of the most deprived local authority housing in the Borough of Wandsworth, in an area which saw condemned slums after their erection in the Victoria era.

=== Railway age ===
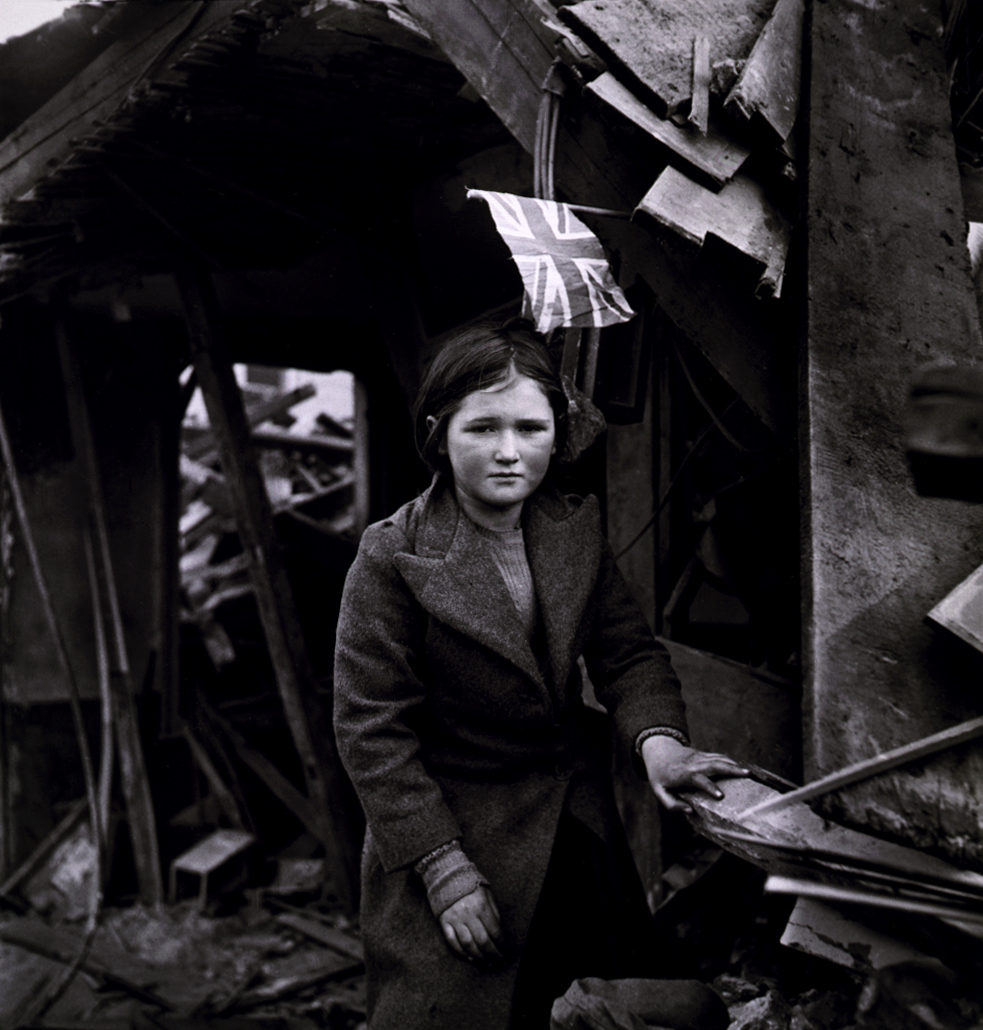
Aftermath of a V-2 bombing at Battersea, 27 January 1945.

Battersea was radically altered by the coming of railways. The London and Southampton Railway Company engineered their railway line from east to west through Battersea, in 1838, terminating at the original Nine Elms railway station at the north east tip of the area. Over the next 22 years five other lines were built, which continue to carry all of the trains to and from London's Waterloo and Victoria termini. An interchange station was built in 1863 towards the north west of the area, at a junction of the railway. Taking the name of a fashionable village a mile and more away, the station was named 'Clapham Junction': a campaign to rename it "Battersea Junction" fizzled out as late as the early twentieth century.

During the latter decades of the nineteenth century Battersea had developed into a major town railway centre with two locomotive works at Nine Elms and Longhedge and three important motive power depots (Nine Elms, Stewarts Lane and Battersea) all in an initial pocket of north Battersea. The effect was precipitate: a population of 6,000 people in 1840 was increased to 168,000 by 1910; and save for the green spaces of Battersea Park, Clapham Common, Wandsworth Common and some smaller isolated pockets, all other farmland was built over, with, from north to south, industrial buildings and vast railway sheds and sidings (much of which remain), slum housing for workers, especially north of the main east–west railway, and gradually more genteel residential terraced housing further south.

The railway station encouraged the government to site its buildings in the area surrounding Clapham Junction, where a cluster of new civic buildings including the town hall, library, police station, court and post office was developed along Lavender Hill in the 1880s and 1890s. The Arding & Hobbs department store, diagonally opposite the station, was the largest of its type at the time of its construction in 1885; and the streets near the station developed as a regional shopping district. The area was served by a vast music hall – The Grand – opposite the station (nowadays serving as a nightclub and venue for smaller bands) as well as a large theatre next to the town hall (the Shakespeare Theatre, later redeveloped following bomb damage). All this building around the station shifted the focus of the area southwards, and marginalised Battersea High Street (the main street of the original village) into no more than an extension of Falcon Road.

=== Social housing estates ===
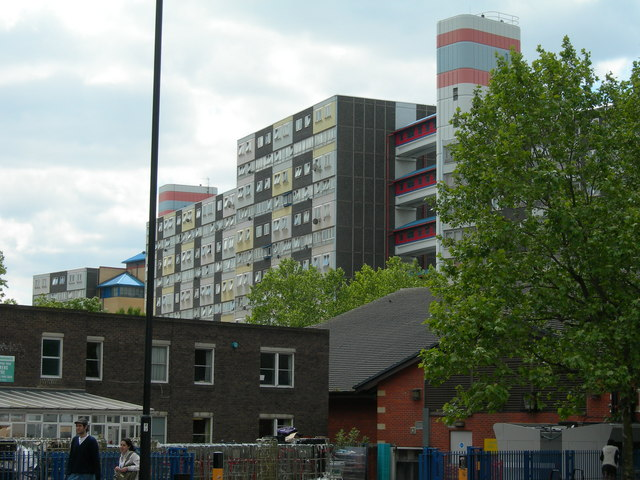
Doddington and Rollo Estate.

Battersea has a long and varied history of social housing, and the completion of the Shaftesbury Park Estate in 1877 was one of the earliest in London or the UK. Additionally, the development of the Latchmere Estate in 1903 was notable both for John Burns' involvement and for being the first estate directly built by a council's own workforce and therefore the first true "council estate". Indeed, both of these earlier estates have since been recognised as conservation areas due to their historical and architectural significance and are protected from redevelopment.

Battersea also has a large area of mid-20th century public housing estates, almost all located north of the main railway lines and spanning from Fairfield in the west to Queenstown in the east.

There are four particularly large estates. The Winstanley Estate, perhaps being the most renowned of them all, is known as being the birthplace to the garage collective So Solid Crew. Winstanley is close to Clapham Junction railway station in the northern perimeter of Battersea, and is currently being considered for comprehensive redevelopment as one of the London Mayor's new Housing Zones. Further north towards Chelsea is the Surrey Lane Estate, and on Battersea Park Road is the Doddington and Rollo Estate. East, toward Vauxhall, is the Patmore Estate which is in close proximity to the Battersea Power Station.

Other smaller estates include: York Road (see Winstanley Estate), Ashley Crescent, Badric Court, Carey Gardens, Chatham Road, Ethelburga, Falcon Road, Gideon Road, Honeywell Road, Kambala, Peabody, Robertson Street, Savona, Somerset, Wilditch and Wynter Street.

=== World War I: The Battersea Battalion ===
On the outbreak of World War I in August 1914 Earl Kitchener of Khartoum, issued his famous call to arms: 'Your King and Country Need You'. But the flood of volunteers overwhelmed the ability of the Army to absorb them, and units began to be raised by local initiative rather than at regimental depots, often from men from particular localities or backgrounds who wished to serve together: these were known as 'Pals battalions'. The 'Pals' phenomenon quickly spread across the country, as local recruiting committees offered complete units. Encouraged by this response, Kitchener approached the 28 Metropolitan boroughs of the County of London, and the 'Great Metropolitan Recruiting Campaign' went ahead in April 1915, with each mayor asked to raise a unit of local men.

One such unit was raised on 3 June 1915 by the Mayor and Borough of Battersea as the 10th (Service) Battalion, Queen's (Royal West Surrey Regiment) (Battersea). (Although Battersea was by then in the County of London, the Queen's (Royal West Surrey Regiment) was still the Regular Army regiment covering South London, while the London Regiment, including the 23rd Battalion based at Clapham Junction, consisted entirely of part-time soldiers of the Territorial Force (TF).)

The Battersea Battalion served alongside Pals battalions from Lambeth (11th Queens), Bermondsey (12th East Surreys) and Lewisham (10th West Kents) in 41st Division on the Western Front, including the battles of the Somme, Messines, and Ypres, on the Italian Front, and then back in the west against the German spring offensive and in the final victorious Hundred Days Offensive. The Battersea Battalion was kept up to strength with dismounted cavalrymen from the Surrey Yeomanry (TF), based at Clapham Park. After the Armistice it took part in the Occupation of the Rhineland and was finally disbanded in 1920.

== Governance ==
Arms granted to the Metropolitan Borough of Battersea in 1955

A map showing the wards of Battersea Metropolitan Borough as they appeared in 1916.

A traditional, such as Metropolitan Borough scope of Battersea is slightly exceeded by SW8 and SW11 postcodes

The tradition of local government in England was based in part of Manor, and later on the Parish. Battersea's governance can be traced back to 693, when the manor was held by the nunnery of St. Mary at Barking Abbey. After the Norman Conquest of 1066, control of the manor passed to Westminster Abbey, ending at the time of the Dissolution of the Monasteries in 1540. Battersea was one of only three of the Abbey's demesne directly supervised by monks, rather than being let to tenants. Local control rested with an officer appointed by the abbey, variously termed a beadle, reeve or sergeant, whose responsibility it was supervise the farm servants of the manor, and to enforce and direct customary work performed by manorial tenants.

After 1540 the Crown assumed ownership of the manor, and let it on short leases to a succession of individuals, until in about 1590 it came into the hands of the St. John family of Lydiard Tregoze in Wiltshire, who later became the St John Baronets of Lydiard Tregoze and ultimately the Viscounts Bolingbroke. Bolingbrokes exercised control of the manor for some 173 years, showing varying levels of interest and competence in running the estate's affairs, until in 1763 the disastrously dissolute Frederick St John, 2nd Viscount Bolingbroke sold the manor to help to settle his many debts. Battersea now passed into the Spencer family - John Spencer, 1st Earl Spencer being related to Frederick's wife.

The Survey of London identified the period of Frederick's tenure with the development of the Vestry in Battersea; absent a competent lord of the manor, this local secular and ecclesiastical government took it upon itself to establish a workhouse in 1733, and met monthly from 1742.

The period of Spencer ownership of the manor saw important land ownership changes introduced to the area. The family had many estates, such as at Althorp in Northamptonshire and Wiseton in Nottinghamshire. Locally, their interests were concentrated on Wimbledon. During their tenure, large tracts of land were sold, notably around 1761, and from 1835 to 1838, leading to the development of a plurality of smaller estates, which had implications for the later development of the area.

The scope of governance throughout this period was relatively slight. Lords of the manor were responsible for church appointments and maintenance of the fabric of the church; for drainage, and for the direction of the duties of the manor's tenants. From time to time work was done under manorial direction on the Thames foreshore; and a Spencer was responsible for the construction of first local bridge across the Thames, Battersea Bridge from 1771 to 1772. And albeit Battersea saw some slow change over the first seven centuries of the second millennium, it was not until a later period that an imperative for greater local government arose.

The vestry of Battersea continued to increase in importance from 1742, notably concerning itself with Poor Law administration and drainage. Responsibility for the latter was removed from the vestry in 1855 with the establishment of Metropolitan Boards of Work under the Metropolis Management Act 1855; a Metropolitan Board concerned itself with cross-London drainage and sewerage, whilst a local Wandsworth Metropolitan Board assumed responsibility for minor sewers and the connection of houses to sewerage systems. It was during the tenure of the Wandsworth board that much of Battersea was developed; but such was the pace of development in Battersea that by 1887 it had a population sufficient to win the case for renewed local autonomy under the Metropolis Management (Battersea and Westminster) Act 1887. The Battersea vestry continued through to 1899, when it became the Metropolitan Borough of Battersea as a result of the London Government Act 1899.

The Metropolitan Borough of Battersea was in 1965 combined with the neighbouring Metropolitan Borough of Wandsworth to form the London Borough of Wandsworth. The former Battersea Town Hall, opened in 1893, is now the Battersea Arts Centre.

In the period from 1880 onwards, Battersea was known as a centre of radical politics in the United Kingdom. John Burns founded a branch of the Social Democratic Federation, Britain's first organised socialist political party, in the borough and after the turmoil of dock strikes affecting the populace of north Battersea, was elected to represent the borough in the newly formed London County Council. In 1892, he expanded his role, being elected to Parliament for Battersea North as one of the first Independent Labour Party members of Parliament.

Battersea's radical reputation gave rise to the Brown Dog affair, when in 1904 the National Anti-Vivisection Society sought permission to erect a drinking fountain celebrating the life of a dog killed by vivisection. The fountain, forming a plinth for the statue of a brown dog, was installed in the Latchmere Recreation Ground, became a cause célèbre, fought over in riots and battles between medical students and the local populace until its removal in 1910.

The borough elected the first black mayor in London in 1913 when John Archer took office, and in 1922 elected the Bombay-born Communist Party member Shapurji Saklatvala as MP for Battersea; one of only two communist members of Parliament.

Battersea is currently divided into five Wandsworth wards. The Member of Parliament for the Battersea constituency since 8 June 2017 has been Labour MP Marsha de Cordova.

== Geography ==
Battersea is on the curved south bank of the River Thames.

=== Riverside ===
Battersea's northern limit is thus the Tideway, the Thames below Teddington. Battersea's riverside is just over 3 miles (4.8 km) long. Immediately to the west is Wandsworth Town. To the north-east are Vauxhall and then Lambeth, including Waterloo.

=== Other boundaries ===
Battersea at one end of its riverside has a western corner at a point 350 metres east northeast of Wandsworth Bridge, and Battersea tapers SSE to almost a point, roughly three miles (4.8 km) from Battersea's northeastern corner – but two miles (3.2 km) from the western corner.

=== Neighbouring districts ===
To the north is Chelsea, to the east are South Lambeth and Stockwell; to the south is Balham; to the southeast is Clapham; and to the west is Wandsworth Town, south of which is Wandsworth.

Two large neighbourhoods within the larger Battersea are:

- Clapham Junction (the central and most commercial part of Battersea),
- Nine Elms (to the north-east, east of Battersea Park)

== Crime ==
Some parts of Battersea have become known for drug-dealing. The Winstanley and York Road council estates have developed a reputation for such offences and were included in a zero-tolerance "drug exclusion zone" in 2007.

== Demography ==
As of 2011, Battersea had a population of 73,345. The district was 52.2% of White British origin, as against an average for Wandsworth of 53.3%.

== Landmarks ==
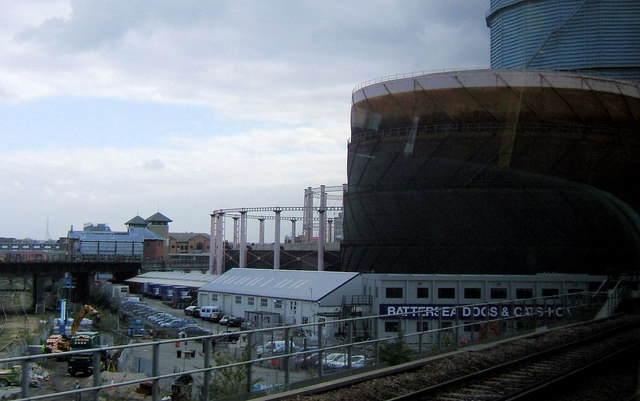
Battersea Dogs home (with gasworks alongside)

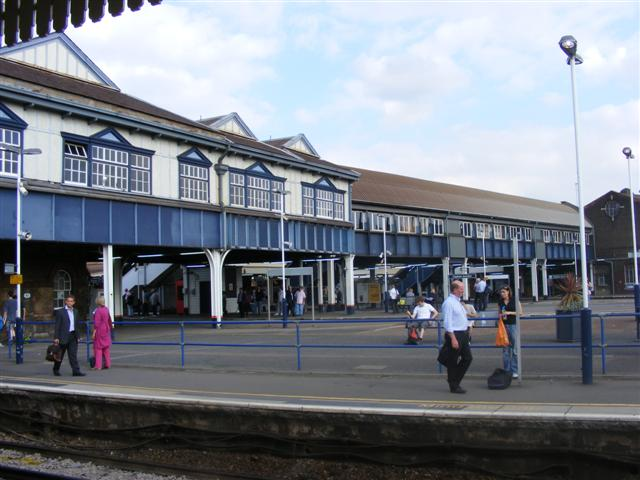
Clapham Junction station, Battersea

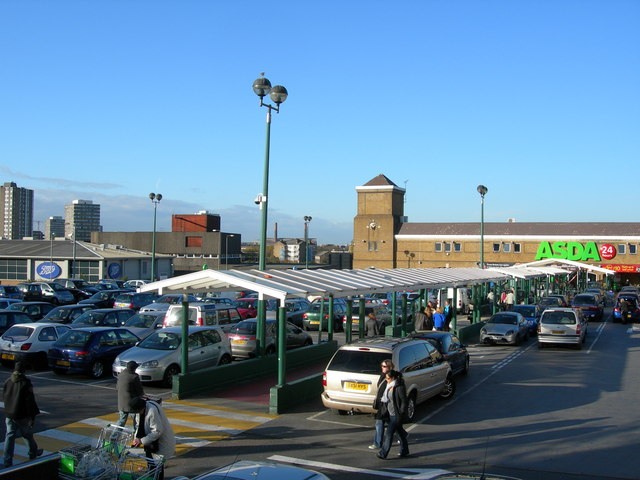
Large Asda supermarket next to and visible from Clapham Junction Railway Station

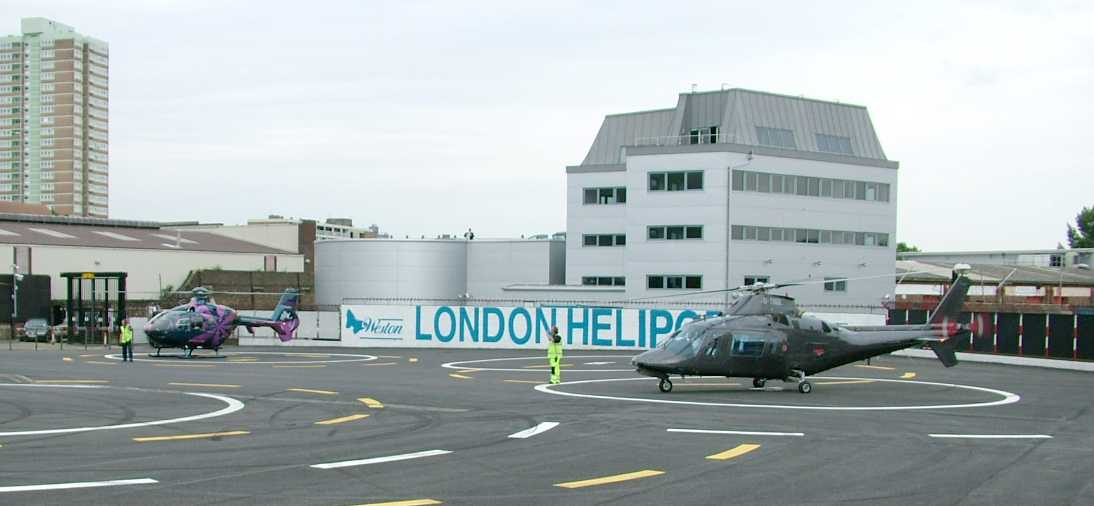
London Heliport, Battersea

Within the bounds of modern Battersea are (from east to west):

- New Covent Garden Market, a major fruit and vegetable wholesale market, resited from Covent Garden in 1974. (Also considered by many to be in Nine Elms).
- Battersea Power Station, an iconic edifice designed by Sir Giles Gilbert Scott, built between 1929 and 1939 (notably featured, with flying pig, on the sleeve art of Pink Floyd's album Animals). Since 2021, the power station's disused shell has housed a mass entertainments and commercial complex, with dedicated transport links provided by Battersea Power Station tube station, which terminates an extension of the Northern line from Kennington via Nine Elms tube station.
- Battersea Dogs and Cats Home, formerly Battersea Dogs Home and prior to that the Temporary Home for Lost and Starving Dogs, established in Holloway in 1860 and moved to Battersea in 1871. It is the United Kingdom's most famous refuge for stray dogs. Also the main location for ITV 1's Paul O'Grady: For the Love of Dogs
- Battersea Park, a 200-acre green space laid out by Sir James Pennethorne between 1846 and 1864 and opened in 1858, and home to a zoo and the London Peace Pagoda.
- Shaftesbury Park Estate, conservation area consisting of over a thousand Victorian houses preserved in their original style.
- Battersea Arts Centre, in the former Battersea Town Hall
- Northcote Road, a bustling and famous local shopping street with its own market at the centre of the so-called Nappy Valley.
- Clapham Junction railway station, by at least one measure – passenger interchanges— the busiest station in the United Kingdom and named after the neighbouring town of Clapham although it lies in the geographic heart of Battersea, SW11.
- Arding & Hobbs building, completed in 1912, occupied by TK Maxx and Debenhams until the latter's dissolution in June 2021. As of December 2022, the Grade II listed building was undergoing renovation back to its 1920s glory by its owner, the commercial property specialists W.RE, which held extensive consultation with local people in 2020.
- Large Asda supermarket, adjacent to Clapham Junction station.
- 92 St John's Hill, Grade II listed building.
- St Mary's Church, Battersea. Benedict Arnold is buried here. Four stained glass windows celebrate Arnold, William Blake, William Curtis and J. M. W. Turner.
- Sir Walter St John's School, now Thomas's day school, was founded in 1700. Parts of the present building date back to 1859.
- Royal Academy of Dance, containing several studios and associated with the University of Surrey.
- The London Heliport, London's busiest heliport, sited on the Thames a half-mile north of Clapham Junction station.
- Price's Candles on York Road, was the largest manufacturers of candles in the UK; now it has been converted into office space from which Hanne & Co Solicitors firm operates.
- Newton Preparatory School, in an Edwardian building (with modern extension) formerly occupied by Clapham College, Notre Dame School and Raywood Street School.
- Falconbrook Primary School, resides in a large Victorian building, situated in the Winstanley Estate, Battersea.

== Transport ==
=== National Rail ===
Battersea is served by three National Rail stations: Battersea Park, Clapham Junction, and Queenstown Road (Battersea). All three stations are in London fare zone 2.

==== Battersea Park ====
Battersea Park is served by some Southern trains and a limited early morning and late evening service on the Windrush line.

Trains northbound terminate at London Victoria, which is the next stop along the line. Southbound, Southern's "metro" services run to Clapham Junction, Wandsworth Common, and Balham. After Balham, trains head towards Croydon, Epsom, London Bridge, and Sutton, amongst other destinations.

The first station to carry the name "Battersea Park" was opened by the London, Brighton and South Coast Railway (LB&SCR) as "Battersea" on 1 October 1860 and was located at the southern end of what is now Grosvenor Bridge. It closed on 1 November 1870. The LB&SCR opened another station on a high-level line on 1 May 1867 called Battersea Park. Another station existed closed to the current station called Battersea Park Road railway station by the London, Chatham and Dover Railway in 1867 and closed in 1916.

==== Clapham Junction ====
The largest railway station in Battersea is Clapham Junction, to the southwest of the district. The station is a busy interchange, and it serves destinations across London, the South, and South West England. Train operators from Clapham Junction include:

- London Overground's Mildmay line, which operates trains northbound towards Stratford, calling at major destinations such as Shepherd's Bush, Willesden Junction, Camden Road, and Hackney Central. While the Windrush line on the network runs trains eastbound towards Dalston, passing through Clapham, Denmark Hill, Peckham, Canada Water, and Whitechapel along the way.
- Southern, which principally operates northbound services towards London Victoria. Southbound services run to destinations such as Balham, Brighton, Croydon, Epsom, and Gatwick Airport. Southern also operates a service towards Watford Junction from East Croydon. North of Clapham Junction, the services calls at Shepherd's Bush, Wembley Central and Harrow & Wealdstone.
- South Western Railway, which runs services towards London Waterloo and Vauxhall northbound. Major destinations to the southwest include Wimbledon, Richmond, Kingston upon Thames, Reading, Guildford, Southampton, Bournemouth, and Salisbury.

In terms of the number of train movements, Clapham Junction is Europe's busiest railway station. It opened on 21 May 1838.

==== Queenstown Road (Battersea) ====
Queenstown Road (Battersea) is served by some South Western Railway trains. Northbound, most trains call at Vauxhall en route to London Waterloo. Southbound passengers can travel towards Richmond, Twickenham, Hounslow, and Windsor & Eton direct.

Queenstown Road opened up the line on 1 November 1877 by the London and South Western Railway, as Queen's Road (Battersea). British Rail renamed the station to Queenstown Road (Battersea) on 12 May 1980.

=== London Underground ===
As part of Northern line extension to Battersea, Battersea is connected to the London Underground network at Battersea Power Station tube station in September 2021.

=== Bus ===
London Bus routes 44, 137, 156, 211, 344, 436, 10, 35, 37, 39, 219, 77, 87, 49, 170, 295, G1 319, 345 and 452 serve the Battersea area during the daytime. Night buses N19, N31, N87 N137 and N44, as well as the 35. 37, 295, 344 and 345 route, run overnight.

=== Cycling ===
Cycling infrastructure in Battersea is provided by the London Borough of Wandsworth and Transport for London (TfL).

- Cycle Superhighway 8 passes through Battersea. The route runs unbroken from Wandsworth Town to Millbank, which is near the Palace of Westminster. It is a signposted route, and runs through the district largely along A3205/Battersea Park Road. To the east, however, the route turns northwards (along A3216/Queenstown Road), leaving Battersea over Chelsea Bridge.
- A cycle lane links Battersea to Vauxhall along A3205/Nine Elms Lane.

== In popular culture ==
Battersea features in the books of Michael de Larrabeiti, who was born and brought up in the area: A Rose Beyond the Thames recounts the working-class Battersea of the 1940s and 1950s; The Borrible Trilogy presents a fictional Battersea, home to fantasy creatures known as the Borribles. The station makes a brief appearance in The Beatles' second film, Help!, in 1965. It also appears in the 1969 film Battle of Britain, in the movie as in real life used as a navigational landmark by the attacking Luftwaffe bombers. The Optimists of Nine Elms, a 1973 film starring Peter Sellers, is set in Battersea.

Battersea is also the setting for Penelope Fitzgerald's 1979 Booker Prize–winning novel, Offshore. Kitty Neale's Nobody's Girl is set in a fictional café and the surrounding Battersea High Street Market. Nell Dunn's 1963 novel Up the Junction (later adapted for both television and cinema) depicts contemporary life in the industrial slums of Battersea near Clapham Junction. Battersea provides the backdrop for the real world scenes in the audio book and app series Rockford's Rock Opera.

Michael Flanders, half of the 1960s comedy duo Flanders and Swann, often made fun of Donald Swann for living in Battersea. Morrissey mentions Battersea in his song "You're the One for Me, Fatty". Babyshambles recorded the song "Bollywood to Battersea" for a 2005 charity album Help!: A Day in the Life. Hooverphonic recorded the song "Battersea" for the 1999 album Blue Wonder Power Milk.

Battersea is the setting for Joan Aiken's Black Hearts in Battersea, the second published volume in the Wolves Chronicles.

Battersea Power Station is featured on the cover of the Pink Floyd album Animals.

Battersea is the location of the titular character's disappearance into the labyrinth in Susanna Clarke's 2020 novel Piranesi.

== Prominent people ==
The following people have lived, or currently live, in Battersea:

- Fara Williams- footballer
- Denzel Bentley - boxer
- Jason Okundaye - writer & journalist
- Malachi Kirby - actor
- Monie Love - mc and radio personality
- Patricia Bright - content creator and influencer, raised in Battersea
- Rodney P - rapper and musician
- So Solid Crew - music collective, with the likes of Megaman, Swiss, Harvey, Romeo & G-Man being raised in SW11
- Skeamer - rapper and musician raised in the Clapham Junction area of Battersea
- Che Lingo - rapper, musician and artist raised on the Surrey Lane estate in Battersea
- Ultimate Kaos - music collective
- Jamie Lawrence - footballer
- Bradley Skeete - boxer, born and raised on the Surrey Lane estate
- Olive Morris - activist and community leader, raised partly on Lavender Hill
- Clinton Morrison - footballer, grew up in and around the Battersea area and Wandsworth borough more broadly
- Ben Adams – musician from the group a1
- Adele – singer-songwriter
- James Aldridge – writer and journalist
- Lionel Barber
- L. S. Bevington – anarchist poet and essayist, was born and grew up in a Quaker family on St Johns Hill
- Ronnie Biggs – criminal who took part in the Great Train Robbery
- Johnny Briggs – actor, best known for playing Mike Baldwin in Coronation Street
- Ada Buisson – author and novelist
- Kathleen Byron – actress
- Emma Chambers – actress, known for her role as "Alice" in The Vicar of Dibley
- G. K. Chesterton – writer
- Adrian Chiles – television presenter
- Noël Coward – dramatist, actor and cabaret artist
- Brian Cox – physicist, host of science shows for the BBC
- Colin Douglas – stage and television actor
- Nell Dunn – playwright
- Howard Eastman – boxer
- Craig Eastmond – footballer
- Hero Fiennes-Tiffin – model and actor
- Edwin Flavell (Royal Air Force officer) – pilot of the first British aircraft to drop a live atomic bomb
- Freddie Foreman – criminal and associate of the Kray Twins, born in Sheepcote Lane
- Bob Geldof – singer and songwriter
- Pixie Geldof – socialite and model
- Graham Greene – writer, playwright, critic
- Rich Hall – comedian
- Reginald Hammond – first-class cricketer and Royal Navy officer
- Pamela Hansford Johnson – writer
- Ainsley Harriott – chef
- Lauran Hibberd – musician
- Harry Hill – comedian
- Ada Florence Kinton – artist and Salvation Army officer
- Derek Laud – political lobbyist and Big Brother contestant
- Simon Le Bon – musician
- Katie Leung – actress, best known for playing Cho Chang in Harry Potter films
- Monie Love – mc and radio personality
- Kate Maberly – actress
- Terry Manning – music producer
- Noel McKoy – singer and songwriter
- Buster Merryfield – actor, best known as Uncle Albert in Only Fools and Horses
- Dannii Minogue – musician
- Jane Moore – journalist, Loose Women panellist.
- Seán O'Casey – writer
- John O'Farrell – writer
- William Page – historian and general editor of the Victoria County History
- Polly Paulusma – musician
- Mervyn Peake – author
- Rupert Penry-Jones – actor
- Gordon Ramsay – chef
- Joely Richardson – actress
- J.K. Rowling – author
- Greg Rusedski – tennis player
- John Scott – sociologist and Fellow of the British Academy
- Peter Serafinowicz – comedian
- George Shearing – pianist
- Ed Sheeran – musician
- Timothy Spall – actor
- Henry St John, 1st Viscount Bolingbroke
- Donald Swann – musician (of Flanders and Swann)
- Gabriel Thomson – stars in My Family
- Baroness Trumpington – member of the House of Lords
- Paul Joseph Watson – YouTube personality and radio host
- Arthur Webb (co-operator) – Building Society Movement
- William Wilberforce – prominent campaigner against the slave trade
- Edward Adrian Wilson – English physician, polar explorer, natural historian, painter and ornithologist

== See also ==
- Nappy Valley
- Seax of Beagnoth
