= Clapham Junction (area) =

Area in south London, England

Coordinates: 51°27′49.61″N 0°10′4.12″W

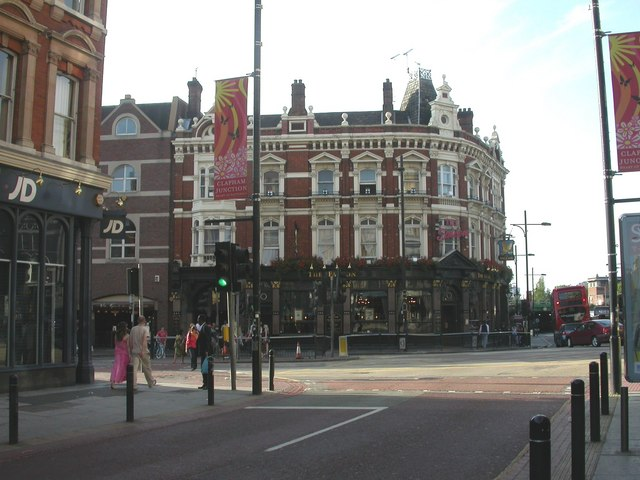
- The Falcon, Clapham Junction

- Location within Greater London
- London borough: Wandsworth
- Ceremonial county: Greater London
- Region: London
- Country: England
- Sovereign state: United Kingdom
- Post town: LONDON
- Postcode district: SW11
- Dialling code: 020
- Police: Metropolitan
- Fire: London
- Ambulance: London
- UK Parliament: Battersea and Clapham
- London Assembly: Merton and Wandsworth

Clapham Junction is a district in the London Borough of Wandsworth, in south-west London, England; it is an urban locality around Clapham Junction railway station. Despite its name, it is not located in Clapham, but forms the commercial centre of Battersea. It was named Clapham Junction to stress its proximity to nearby Clapham Common.

== History ==
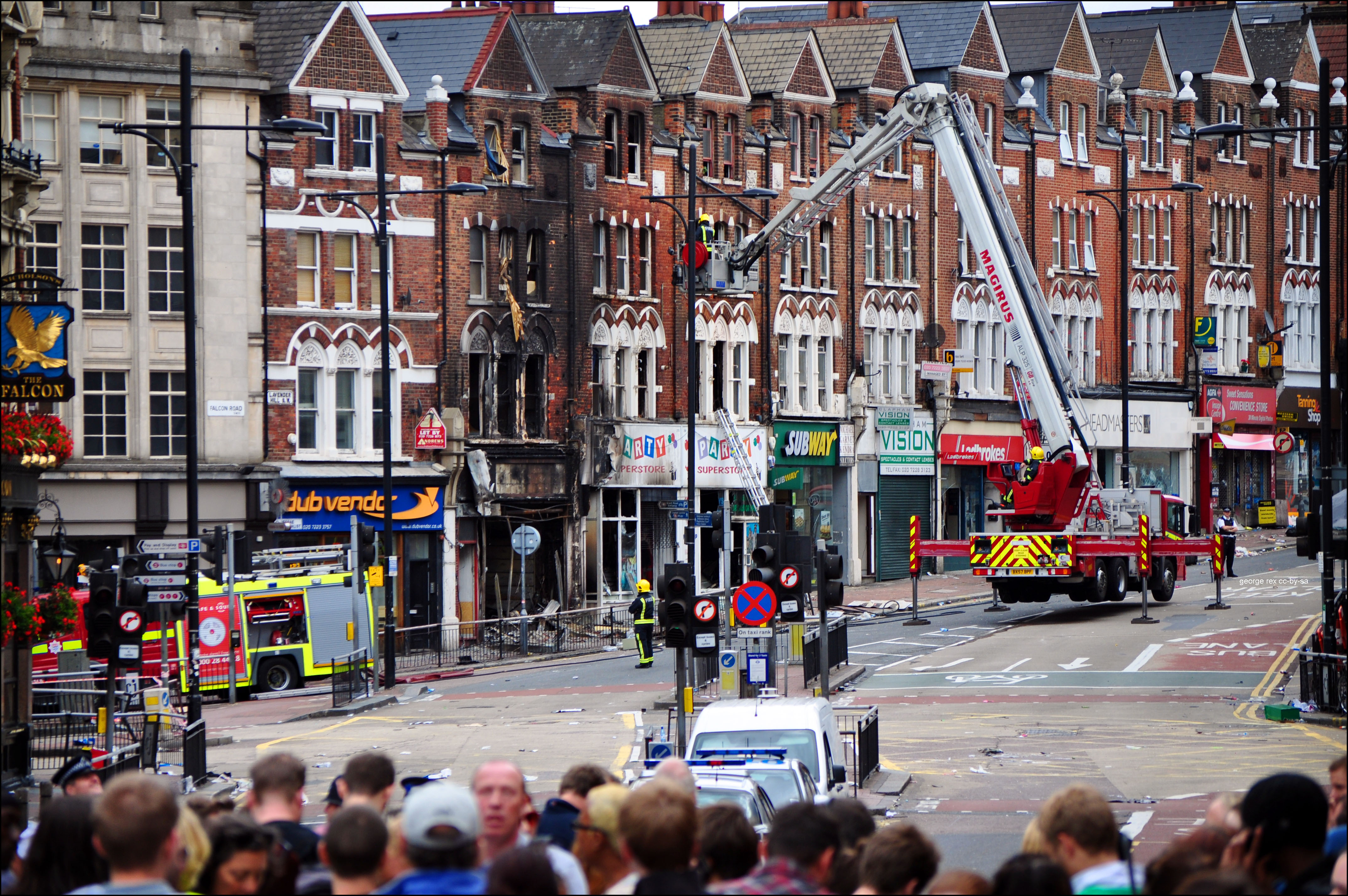
Cleanup on Lavender Hill following the 2011 riots

Clapham Junction was a scene of disturbances during the 2011 London riots.

== Transport ==
Clapham Junction railway station is served by three train operating companies:

- London Overground
- Southern
- South Western Railway

These operators provide trains to Central London, Surrey, Sussex, Hampshire and Dorset.

The following London Buses routes serve the area:35, 37, 39, 49, 77, 87, 156, 170, 219, 295, 319, 337, 344, 345, C3 and G1.
