= Winstanley and York Road Estate =

Housing estates in Battersea, London

Coordinates: 51.4653°N 0.1763°W

- Location within Greater London
- Population: 5,200
- OS grid reference: TQ 26957 75779
- London borough: Wandsworth
- Unitary authority: London
- Ceremonial county: Greater London
- Region: London
- Country: England
- Sovereign state: United Kingdom
- Post town: LONDON
- Postcode district: SW11
- Dialling code: 020
- Police: Metropolitan
- Fire: London
- Ambulance: London
- UK Parliament: Battersea
- London Assembly: Merton and Wandsworth

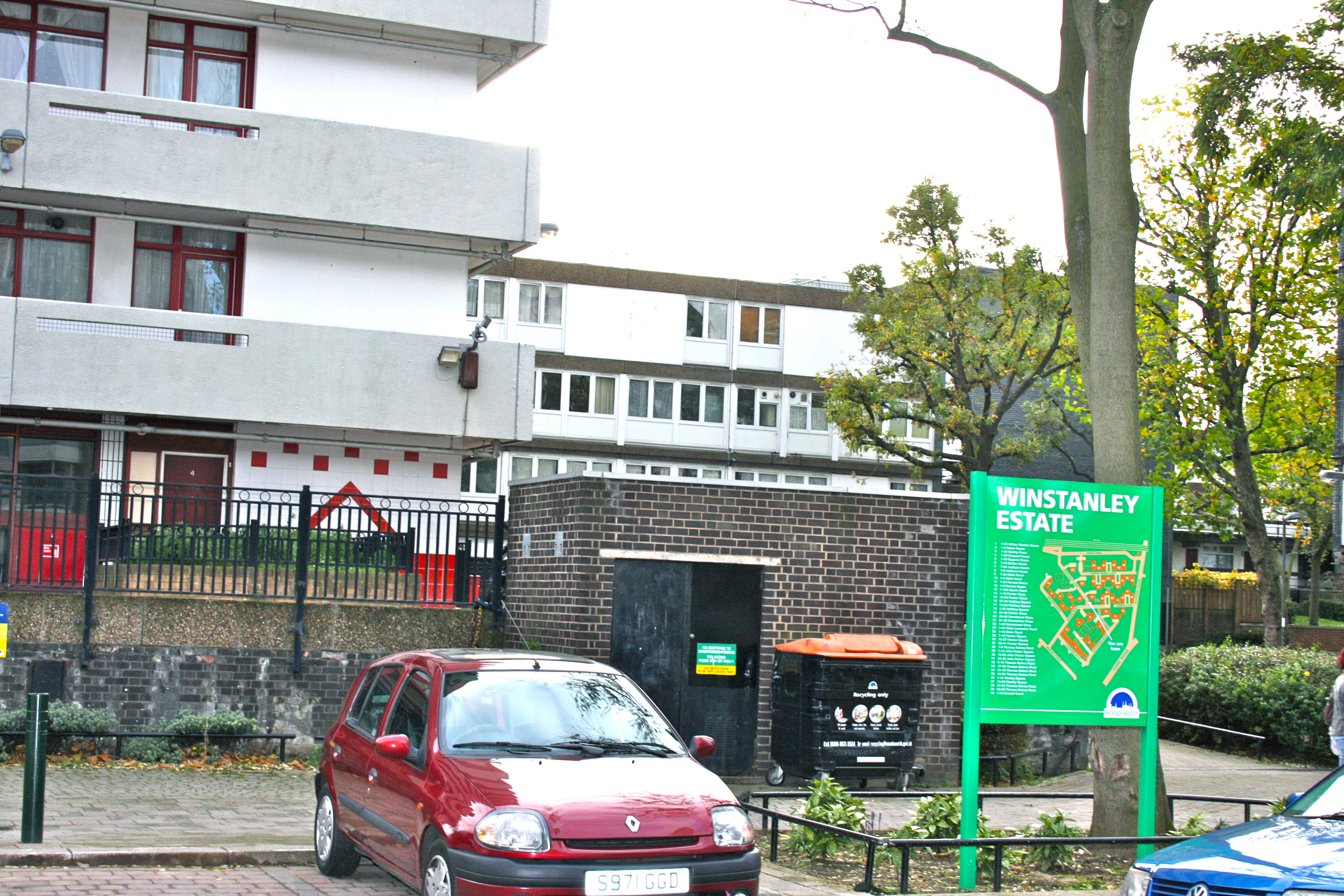
Map of Winstanley Estate, Battersea

The Winstanley and York Road Estate comprises two large estates of predominantly public housing apartments in Battersea, London, adjacent to Clapham Junction railway station, although some have since passed into private ownership.

Due to their proximity to one another, the Winstanley and York Road estates have historically been grouped together and share facilities, including York Gardens and transport links at Clapham Junction. According to official data, there are a total of 1,419 homes on the estates, with approximately 5,200 residents. The locality has had various well-known residents over the years, including: John Burns, Alan Johnson and Levi Roots. The estates are the founding location of the So Solid Crew, a UK garage group that had mainstream success and did much to popularise succeeding genres of UK "urban" music. Work has begun for a planned regeneration scheme (subject to a final review from the Mayor of London), taking place on a timeline of December 2018 until 2030.

== Background ==
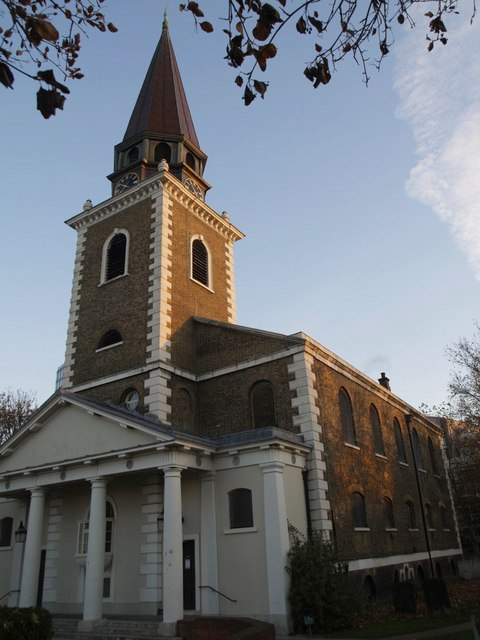
St Marys Church, Battersea 3

=== Middle Ages to the Victorian Era ===
Although the place-name "Patricesy" is recorded in the Domesday Book of 1086, the relatively large settlement of 70 households referred to a parish further north from the estates. This seems to have been almost exactly on the banks of the Thames, closer to the Westbridge Estate and probably around Battersea Church Road and St Mary's Church. The area was still sparsely populated and largely consisted of farmland, with the exception of the Falconbrook, a stream that then flowed overground along what is now Falcon Road. The name of "York" Road possibly derives from a late medieval moated house on the site, built by the Bishop of Durham in 1474 and later given to the Archbishop of York.

The stream became known as the Falcon in the 17th century, named after the birds displayed on the crest of the St John baronets, latterly the Viscount Bolingbrokes, who owned the "whole... area north of St John’s Hill" between 1627 and 1763". The area was acquired by the 1st Earl Spencer of the Earl Spencers in 1763, before the area of the modern estates was sold by the 3rd Earl between 1835 and 1836, primarily for the creation of the London and Southampton Railway and eventually Clapham Junction railway station.

=== Pre-War Development and Pioneering British Black Politics ===
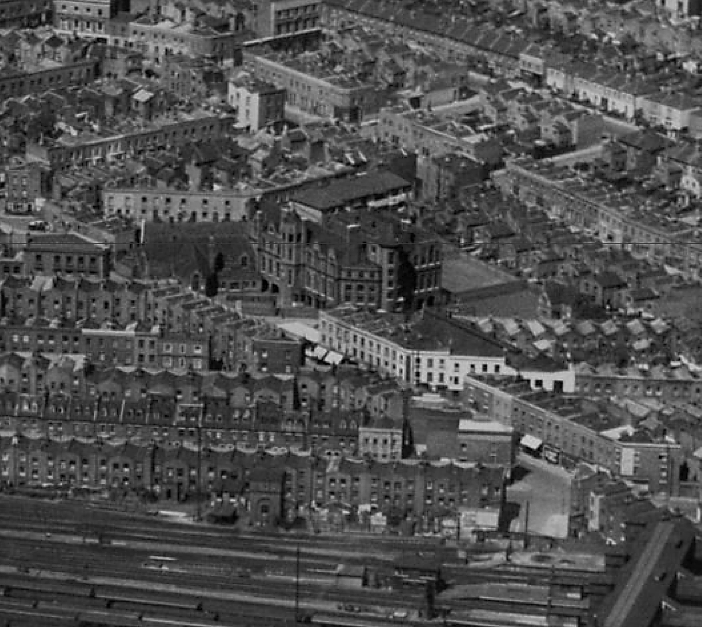
Winstanley Estate Area 1938

Although most prominently associated with the development of the nearby Latchmere Estate in 1903, John Burns was born here in 1858 and grew up at 80 Grant Road with his family, thereafter becoming a Progressive member of the first London County Council for Battersea in 1889 and campaigning vigorously around the area. Whilst the opening of Clapham Junction railway station in 1863 would eventually have a dramatic effect on the area, by the end of the 1860s only small areas of housing on Edward (Wye) Street and Grant Road had been completed. Canon Erskine Clark, upon arrival on Plough Road in 1874, attributed the "proximity to the great railway centre "Clapham Junction" as the main reason for "its recent building boom" and rapid development.

This particular area of "North Battersea" has a long-standing association with poverty and vice. This was documented in the Charles Booth poverty map in 1902, where the main streets of the estate around Darien and Winstanley Roads are coloured black and dark blue to signify "criminal" and "very poor" inhabitants. The Latchmere ward that the Estates area is within was particularly notable for the election of John Archer in 1906, one of the earliest Black British politicians (along with Allan Glaisyer Minns and Henry Sylvester Williams).

=== Inter-War Development and Pioneering British Indian Politics ===
The wider constituency's radical reputation was cemented in 1924, when Shapurji Saklatvala was elected to be one of the first-ever British Indian MPs as a member of the Communist Party of Great Britain for the former Battersea North. The entire area had been "earmarked" for redevelopment as early as the 1930s, but only one block (Darien House on Darien Road) was built before WWII in 1934. The Winstanley Road School was also demolished in 1938 as part of the redevelopment, although this was the last action completed before the beginning of the War.

=== During and Post WWII Development and Politics ===
Again, like many London dockland areas (Ransome's Dock and Cringle Dock are nearby), it was heavily damaged by bombing during The Blitz. The original population of the Winstanley Estate and York Road Estates were largely re-housed from the run-down Victorian terraces that previously stood in the area between 1956 and 1972, some of which can still be seen in films such as Up the Junction in 1965. Much of the motivation to embark on a program of slum clearance for the construction of council estates stemmed from the personal childhood experiences of Battersea Borough's Housing Committee in these run-down homes, including the chairman Sidney Sporle, often with unsafe multiple occupation, shared outdoor toilets, no running water or central heating.

== Modern Location ==
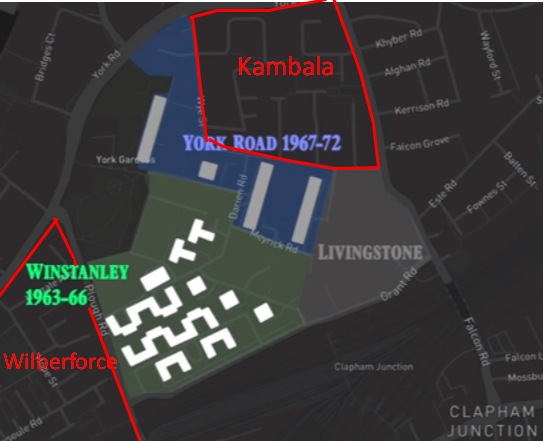
Winstanley and York Road Location

As previously stated, Clapham Junction, which is supposedly the busiest railway-station in London, the UK and Europe in terms of daily rail traffic, is situated directly to the south of the estates. The stream "Falconbrook" or "Battersea Creek" still runs underground along Falcon Road, marking one of the boundaries of the estates. The estates are relatively close to several other local landmarks, including: Battersea Bridge, Battersea Park, the former Battersea Power Station and the new U.S. Embassy. Formerly the Livingstone Estate, an extension of the wider Winstanley Estate, the housing around Sullivan Close on the south-east corner of the estates now forms a private, gated development known as the Falcons Estate. On the nearest eastern boundary of the estates is the Kambala Estate, centred around Kambala Road, which is also a council estate and is in many ways contiguous with the larger Winstanley and York Road Estates, with the three estates sharing many facilities and demographic similarities.

At the North-eastern edge is the Badric Court Estate around Yelverton Road, blocks of council housing that are almost identical to those found on the Winstanley and York Road Estates, but which have access to slightly different facilities compared to the Kambala Estate due to their location. There are then a succession of office blocks and shops running counter-clockwise along York Road, variously featuring: a Halfords Store, Volkswagen Store and a Barker and Stonehouse premises. Communal facilities can be located at York Gardens and York Gardens Library and to the western edge of the estate is the so-called "Wilberforce" or Wynter Street estate around Maysoule Road, a mixture of slightly lower rise blocks very similar to the design of the Kambala Estate and slightly higher-rise blocks also very similar to the design of Badric Court or York Road.

== Construction ==
=== Early Construction and Layout ===
In 1955, the Victorian terraces within the district were formally cleared for "redevelopment". Jackson House and Kiloh Court in Meyrick Road and Farrant House in Darien Road were henceforth all built in 1956 to the specifications of the first architectural firm to work on the estate: Pite, Son & Fairweather. Arthur Newton House along Lavender Road, Baker House on Darien Road and Ganley Court beside Newcomen Road were also completed by these architects between 1959 and 1961. The system-built blocks of the Winstanley Estate around Winstanley Road began construction in 1963 and had finished by approximately 1966. The York Road Estate around Wye Street and the Livingstone Estate around Sullivan Close subsequently started construction in 1967 and were both completed by 1972. All of the developments after 1963 were constructed using the Plattenbau design, in contrast to a mixture with the earlier developments before 1963.

=== Later Phase and Controversy ===
The legacy of Sidney Sporle, the then-leader of Wandsworth Council and one-time mayor of Battersea was tarnished when he was convicted and sentenced for corruption in 1971. He had played a pivotal role in advocating for the redevelopment of the area (and Sporle Court on the Winstanley Estate is still named after him), but was exposed to have used corrupt and possibly unsafe methods in the construction of the nearby Doddington and Rollo Estate. After his imprisonment, there was a substantial campaign in the South London Press and backed by the subsequent Wandsworth Council housing chairman Alderman Dennis Mallam, and the then-chairman of the Winstanley Estate Tenant's Association Ernest Randell, to change the name of the block from Sporle Court, which ultimately appeared to be unsuccessful. In the aftermath of Sid Sporle's conviction, the new council decided to abolish the five-year residency rule before being permitted to apply for council housing, a change that apparently allowed more "black people" of the Windrush Generation and other freshly arrived immigrants to obtain council housing and avoid exploitative landlords.

== Culture ==
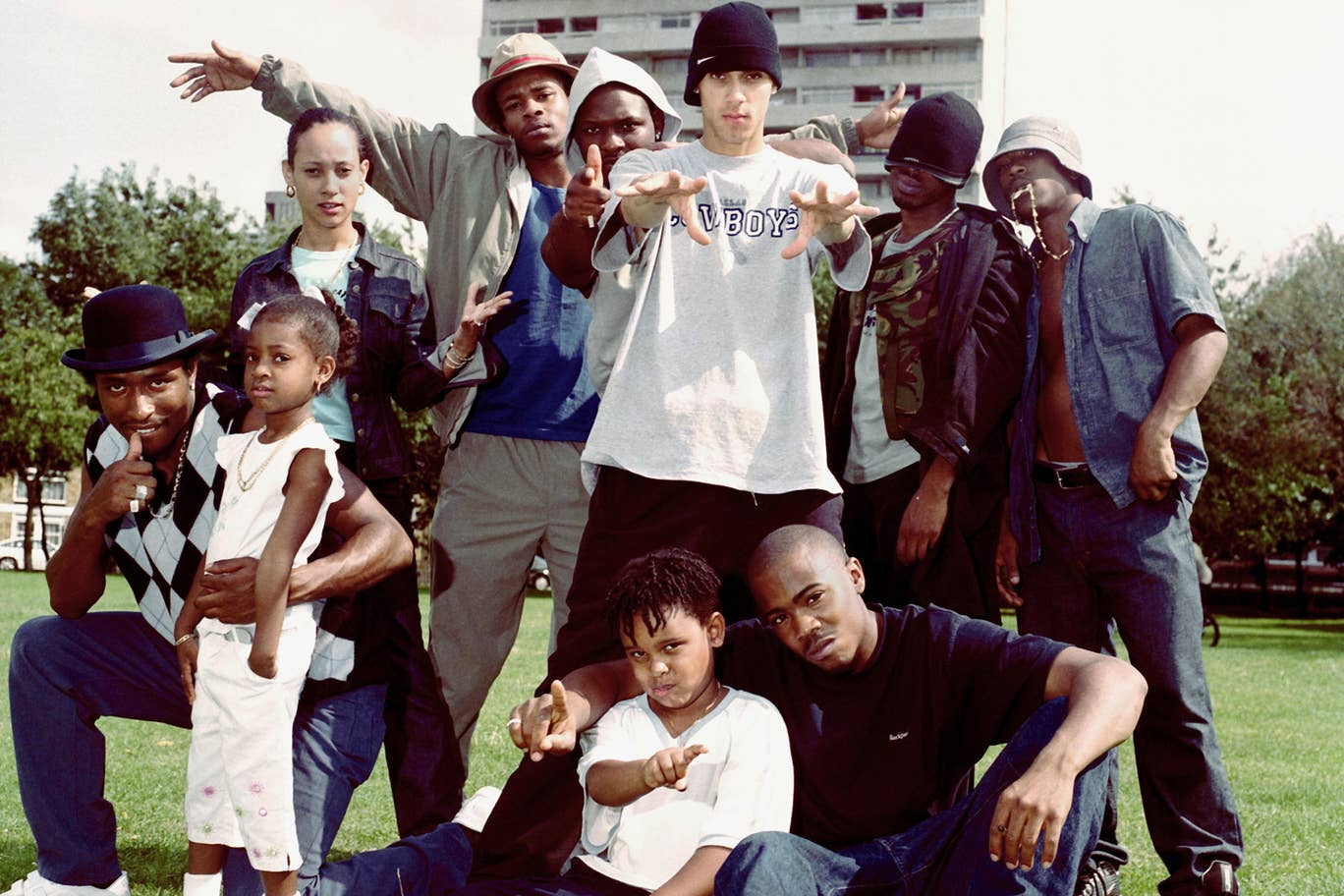
So Solid Crew in York Gardens

=== Music – So Solid Crew and Melodians Steel Orchestra UK ===
The Winstanley Estate is well known within London for being the base of So Solid Crew, who achieved a number 1 with their single "21 seconds", a number 3 with "They Don't Know" and popularised UK Garage and other genres of urban music. The estate now has a well-known musical tradition and many current rappers, producers and drill artists hail from the estates. Michael Fuller also described being taken aback by the impressive musical band (the Melodians Steel Orchestra UK) that hailed from the estate in the late 1990s, which he described as having a positive social impact on the estate and tried to encourage by directing municipal funding towards them. He drew attention to the band's international success under his patronage, including performing at the Royal Albert Hall 15 years in a row, winning the Royal Anniversary Challenge Award in 1992 and perhaps echoing the success of their later and slightly better-known counterparts. Sound Minds, a musical charity that attempts to alleviate mental health problems, also operates on the Estates at York Road.

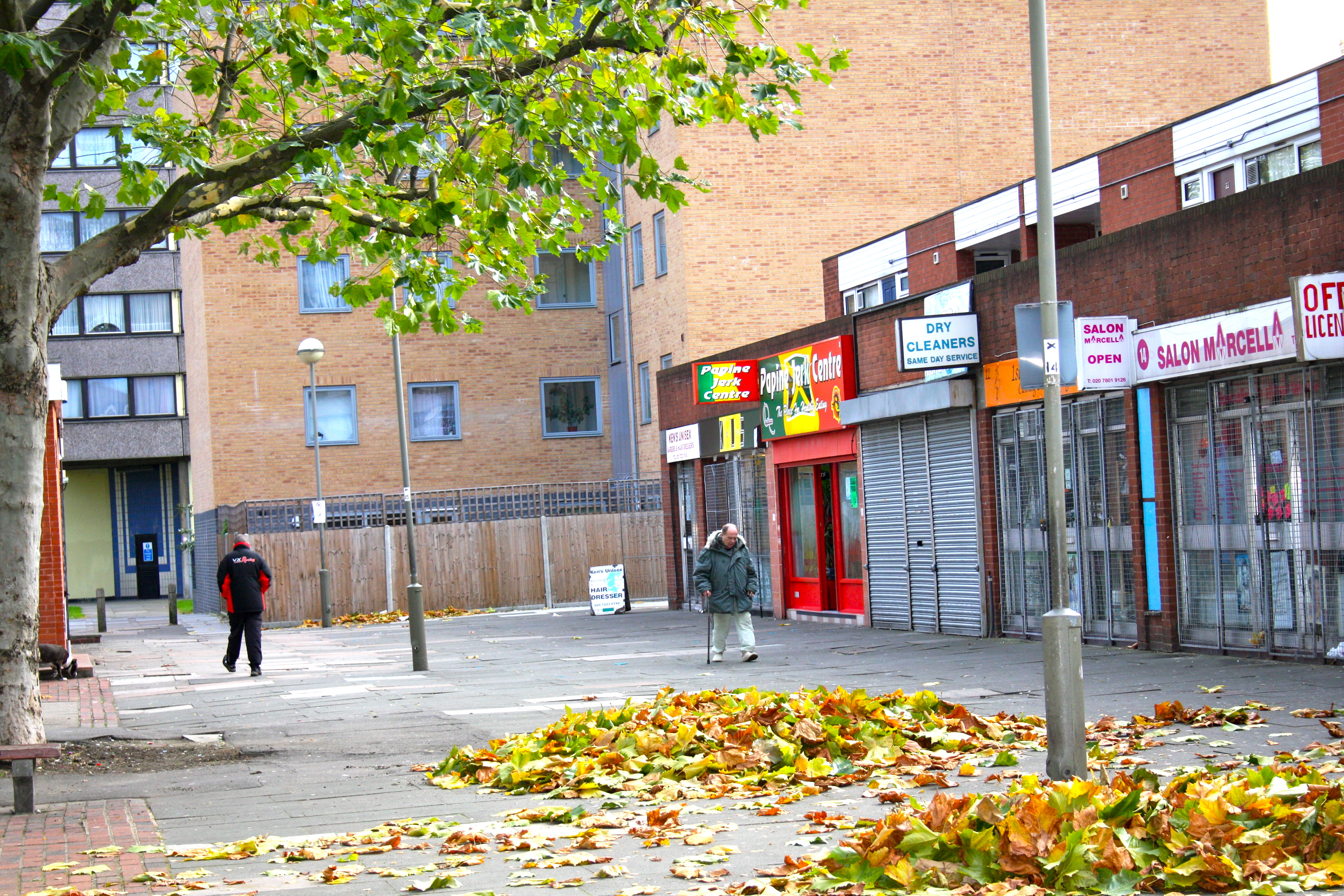
Papine Jerk Centre formerly on the Winstanley Estate, Battersea

=== Food – Levi Roots Links ===
The Winstanley estate is the location of Levi Root's first London restaurant, Papine Jerk Centre, where it served a local school (Thames Christian College) between 2007 and 2013 before closing. Historian Dan Jones referenced this by saying that "middle-class people entering the Winstanley looking for Levi Roots' famous jerk restaurant" was equivalent to "a few kids on stolen 50cc bikes venturing out [of Winstanley]" or "as a form of cultural exchange" where "fair's fair" in the London Evening Standard in 2017. The north of the Winstanley and York Road Estates (mainly York Road) also has a much lower than average rate of supermarkets and convenience stores per 1000 population (0.61) but a higher than average rate of takeaways (3.05 per 1000).

=== Religion ===
There are numerous places of worship, including two churches on the estates and a mosque next to them on Falcon Road. Within the ward as a whole, 59.6% of residents are "Christians", 25.9% have "No Religion", 11.2% are Muslims and there are also much smaller (below 1.5%) minorities of "Hindu", "Buddhist" and "Other Religious" followers.

=== Sports and Arts ===
Battersea Sports Centre is also based on the Winstanley estate and there are many other initiatives nearby in Battersea Park, Battersea Arts Centre and the larger Doddington and Rollo Estate. The Latchmere Leisure Centre, whilst not located directly on the Estates, is very convenient for residents, with an excellent reputation throughout the borough and South London. The footballer Jamie Lawrence also lived for a year in a flat on next-door Totteridge House in Badric Court, later settling on Dunston Road in the Shaftesbury Park Estate and attending John Burns Primary School on Wycliffe Street.

=== Community Initiatives ===
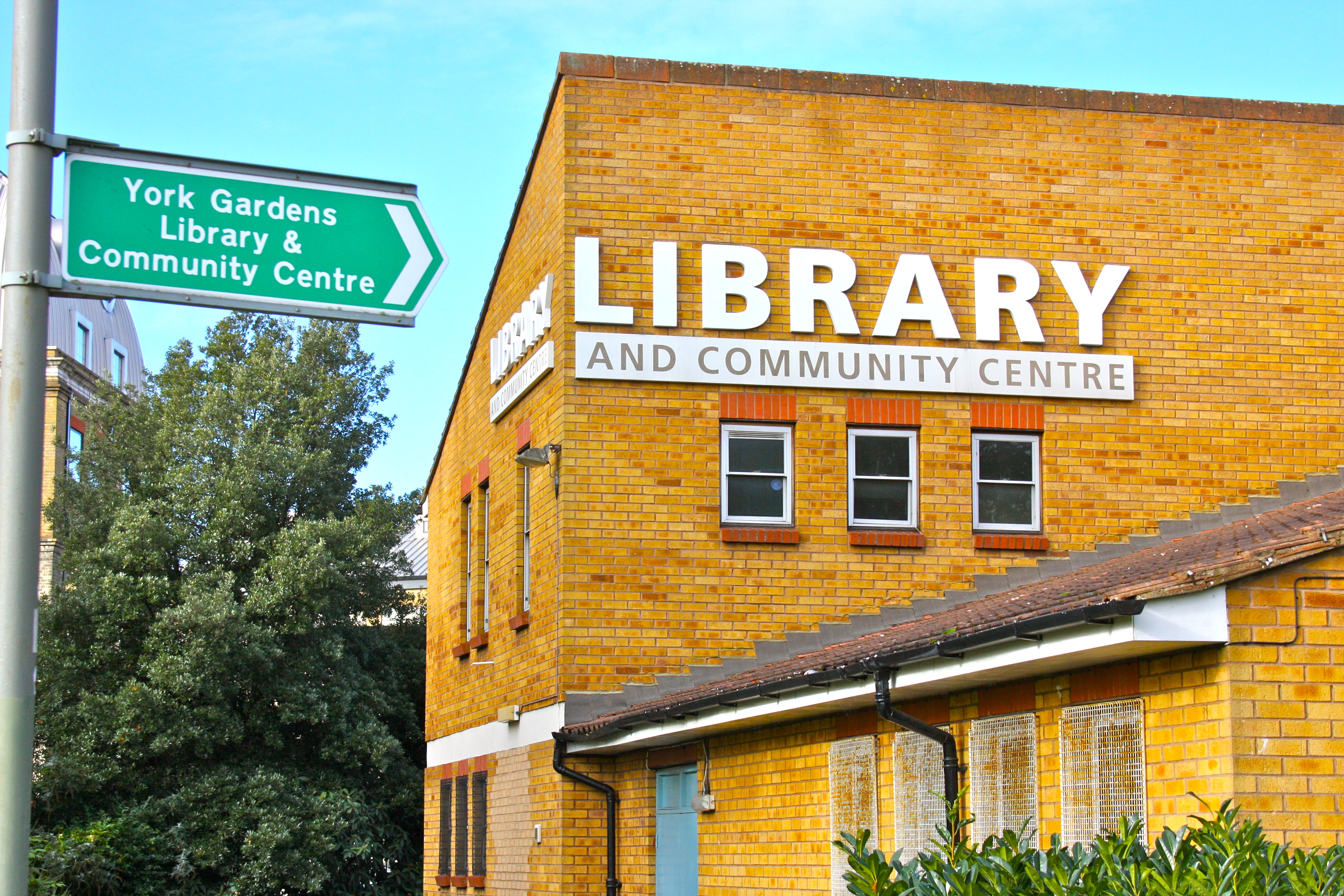
Community Facilities available for the York Road and Winstanley Estates Battersea

There are a number of community activities and partnerships that are either run from the estates or operate substantially there. One of the oldest and most effective is the Katherine Low Settlement on Battersea High Street, which primarily serves residents from the estates and provides an extremely broad range of services and assistance programmes for all members of the community. Another well-established umbrella initiative that operates extensively in the area is the Battersea United Charities (BUC), which was founded in 1641 and is based just south of the estates on Lavender Hill.

A community centre is located in York Gardens Library, which has a wide-ranging array of schedules and facilities for both children and adults. Some more specialised initiatives that operate on and around the estates include the Women of Wandsworth Mums, which has lent its support to the regeneration of the estates through its founder and Battersea Men's Shed. The Mercy Foundation Centre is also located on the Kambala Estate next to the larger Winstanley and York Road and plays an invaluable role for many of the Estate's residents.

== Demographics ==
=== Employment ===
Although applying to the whole of Battersea, defined in the survey as "the Metropolitan Borough of Battersea and those wards of Wandsworth Borough .... along the river to the east of Putney Bridge", Margot Jeffrey's 1954 book analyses employment in the wider area through specific comparisons between Battersea and Dagenham. At that time, Battersea's industries were "old-established" and "policies of industrial dispersion" were feared to have a detrimental potential in "districts such as Battersea where the resident population is declining". She then elaborates by saying that Battersea would represent one such area where "the young move out, leaving an industrial population which is predominantly middle-aged and elderly, and in consequence highly unadaptable to industrial change".

A series of closures in the secondary industry sector and associated with primary and secondary employment in the late 1970s and mid-1980s, such as: Battersea Power Station in 1975, a Tate & Lyle factory on York Place in 1980 and the large Airfix Factory on Haldane Place in next-door Earlsfield in 1981 all had a negative impact on employment prospects within the local area. In 1964, Alan Johnson also recalled the "huge Booth's Gin Distillery" "opposite the estate" (that closed around this time) when he was living in Pitt House, Maysoule Road, and the closure of the Carlo Gatti ice depot and warehouses at Ransome's Dock in the late 1970s and early 1980s were other similarly detrimental developments. The socio-economics effect of this de-industrialisation was documented in a 1981 Thames News report focusing on the estates, claiming that unemployment had risen by 69% from 1980 to 1981 and there were 13,000 people out of work within the Borough. This has remained an issue since, and the Latchmere ward has had the highest unemployment rate (measured by people of working-age claiming benefits) in government statistics between 1999 and 2016 of any ward within the Borough.

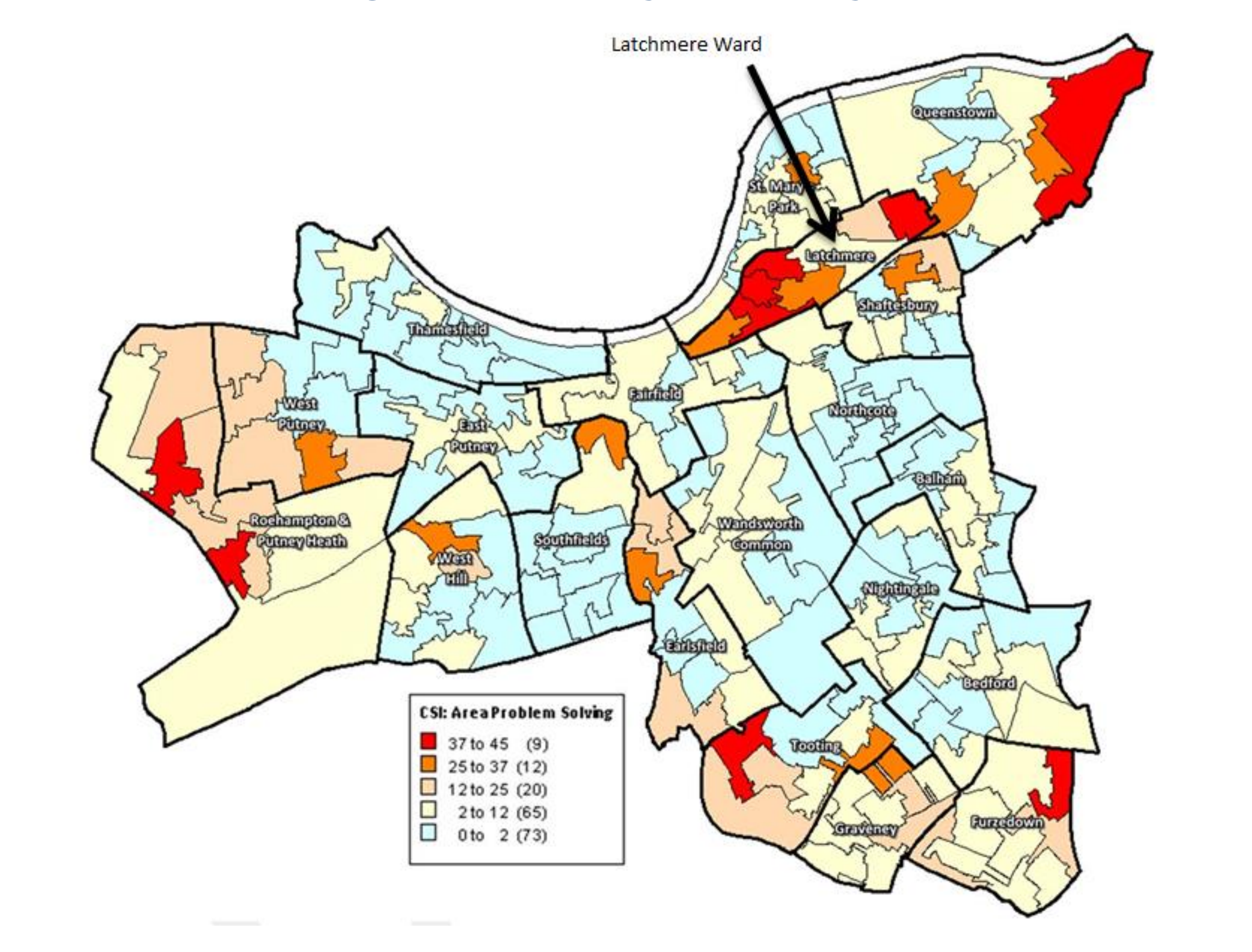
Borough of Wandsworth Community Vulnerability Index 2018

=== Deprivation ===
Like many areas of the UK in the 1980s, there were severe issues with poverty after the closure of nearby factories, which was notably apparent within the younger population. Michael Fuller described this era by asserting that "the buildings may have changed but the people didn't" and the Winstanley as "an area of unemployment, extreme poverty and social deprivation" when recalling his experiences policing the estates in his memoirs. All of the estates are within the top 20% most deprived areas nationally and the worst deprivation (most deprived 10% nationally) is centred around the north of the estates, principally around York Road Estate. The Kinghan Report, commissioned after the London Riots in 2011 for Wandsworth, said that they were one of the five "most difficult to manage estates in the borough" and that large parts of the estates were in the bottom 1% of LSOAs on the measure of Income Deprivation Affecting Children.

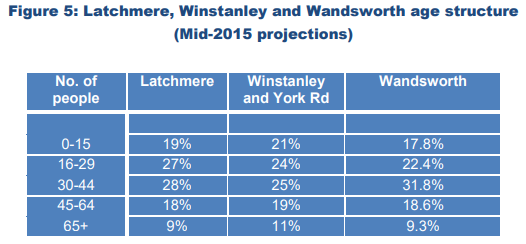
Winstanley Estate Latchmere Ward Wandsworth Borough Age Graphic

=== Population ===
According to official data today, 56% of those living on the estates are from BME groups and 35% are Black, both well above borough averages of 27% and 10.4% respectively. The ward as a whole has the third-highest proportion of ethnic minorities in Wandsworth, after Tooting and Furzedown. There is a substantial Somali minority on the estate and 19% of children attending school from the estate speak Somali as a first language. The proportion of single-parent households with dependent children in the statistical boundaries of the Latchmere ward is also double the average of the borough of Wandsworth at 12%. A population age pyramid of the estates and Latchmere ward shows that the estates have higher levels of 0–16 and 65+ year olds than the ward and London average.

== Education ==
=== Private ===
Thames Christian College is a private school on the Winstanley Estate that tends to draw the vast majority of its pupils from beyond the estates but was also notable for its brief association with Levi Root's former restaurant "the Papine Jerk Centre". However, Thomas's school, another private school next to the Winstanley and Surrey Lane Estates, attracted increased media coverage when Prince George and Princess Charlotte were both enrolled as pupils at the school in 2017. This prompted some discussion from Dan Jones and some of the media about the juxtaposition of violent gang crime and "inner-city neglect" on the Winstanley Estate, Surrey Lane Estate and nearby area to the extreme privilege and wealth of the monarchy.

=== State ===
One of the earliest schools in the immediate vicinity of the Estates was Sir Walter St John's School on Battersea High Street, founded in 1700 by Sir Walter St. John to "teach twenty poor boys", which rapidly expanded throughout its existence. The Elementary Education Act 1870 then split one half of the school into Battersea Grammar School, which first stood at the intersection of Plough Road and St John's Hill between 1875 and 1936. Despite moving to a new site in Streatham after this time, the school retained its original name until it merged with another local school in 1977 to become a comprehensive school as Furzedown Secondary School. Falconbrook primary school is a primary state school situated directly on the Winstanley Estate to serve the residents of the community. Sure Start Battersea is also situated next to the estates to serve the early-learning needs of the community. Most state secondary school pupils from the area will probably attend either: St. John Bosco College on the Surrey Lane Estate or Harris Academy Battersea on the Doddington and Rollo Estate.

== Health ==
According to official data, the area around York Road is "a TfL Air Quality Focus Area, due to high levels of air pollutants; two schools in the ward are also in areas that breach air quality limit values." There is also an above-average level of 0- to 16-year-olds living in the area, a demographic that has higher healthcare levels than average. Levels of childhood excess weight are higher than the Wandsworth average and children and young people living in the ward are more likely to be admitted to hospital with an injury compared to Wandsworth as a whole. It is believed by governmental sources that high pollution levels measured at two local schools and on the Estates are primarily due to considerable building works and transport activities occurring within the ward.

== Crime ==
=== Drug-dealing ===
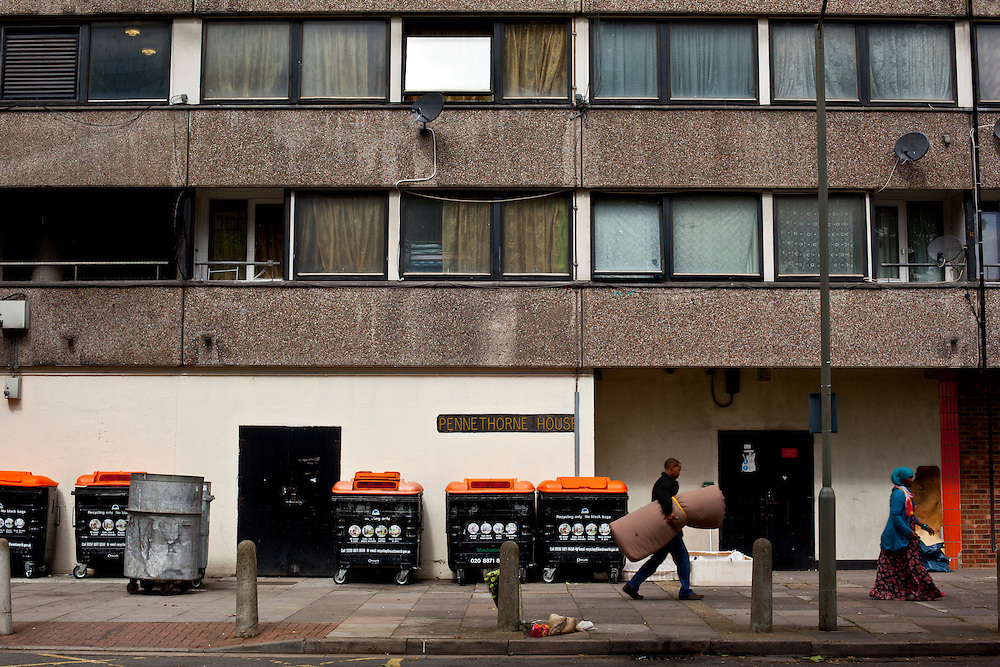
Murder site of and small memorial for Mahad Mohammed on the Winstanley Estate for The Landscape of Murder Photo Project

The modern estates were notorious within the local police station according to Mike Fuller, the first Black Chief Constable, Commander and Deputy Assistant Commissioner within the UK, who was Chief Superintendent at Battersea Police Station between 1999 and 2002. The police implemented official advice never to enter the estates alone because of the "widespread dealing" where dealers "had no fear of anyone, including the police". Policemen were also advised never to walk under walkways, where "anything could be dropped on your head" that also functioned as escape routes for criminals. The adjacency of the estates to Clapham Junction have made them an attractive location for drug dealing, which gained local notoriety because of the decision to introduce harsher penalties on the estate as a trial initiative in 2007.

=== Gangs ===
The modern estates have suffered from a variety of youth disorder and serious crime issues since almost the time of their completion, visually documented from the early 1980s onwards. The area has a multi-generational problem with street gangs in much the same way as other nearby parts of South London. This has seen a shift from the Junction Boys of the 1980s and 1990s, to the Stick'em Up Kids or South under Kontrol (S.U.K) group of the 2000s and 2010s and then the 37/OJB of modern times. There is also a historic rivalry between groups from the Battersea area and those in Tooting and Mitcham, which has been attributed as the reason for much of the youth violence in the Boroughs of Wandsworth and Merton.

=== Gun and Knife Crime ===
Mike Pannett, a former police officer assigned to Battersea from the late 1980s onwards, writes that these estates and Battersea in general was "top of the city's crime league" in the 1980s and was home to such notorious figures as Gary Nelson (described as "London's most dangerous man") who grew up there and was convicted of shooting to death two people, including PC Patrick Dunne. So Solid Crew were one of the first to draw attention to supposed incidents of gun crime that occurred on the estates in the 1990s and 2000s, although notable members (including Ashley Walters) were also accused of glamorising violence by being convicted or charged with many offences involving firearms.

Many teenagers have been shot or stabbed to death in the immediate vicinity of the estates: Fabian Ricketts in 2006, Kyle McDonald in 2013, Matthew Kitwande in 2016 and Mahammed Hassan in 2017. Indeed, Mahad Mohammed in 2011 was 20, Mohammed Hassan in 2016 was 35 and Tesfa Campbell was 38 in 2019. The estate was named as having particularly high levels within Wandsworth of knife crime in the Kinghan Report, but which were still comparatively lower than the Doddington and Rollo and Henry Prince Estates.

=== London Riots 2011 ===
Although the damage wreaked in Clapham Junction during the London Riots of 2011 emerged in large part from the estates, there was uncertainty about how many rioters actually lived on the estates. The Doddington and Rollo, Henry Prince and Winstanley estates were all mentioned as some of the "five most difficult to manage" within the Borough in the Kinghan Report, which was commissioned by Wandsworth Council in the immediate aftermath of the riots. However, it was on Plough Road and Wynter Street that the police were first attacked by a crowd of "60–100 youths" before the size of this crowd increased and moved through the "Winstanley Estate and roads nearby" to arrive at Clapham Junction. Wandsworth Council enforced a controversial policy by attempting to evict the families of convicted looters from all of their social housing (although the most-publicised case was of the family of a 17-year-old from the nearby Doddington and Rollo Estate).

== Regeneration ==
=== Timeline ===
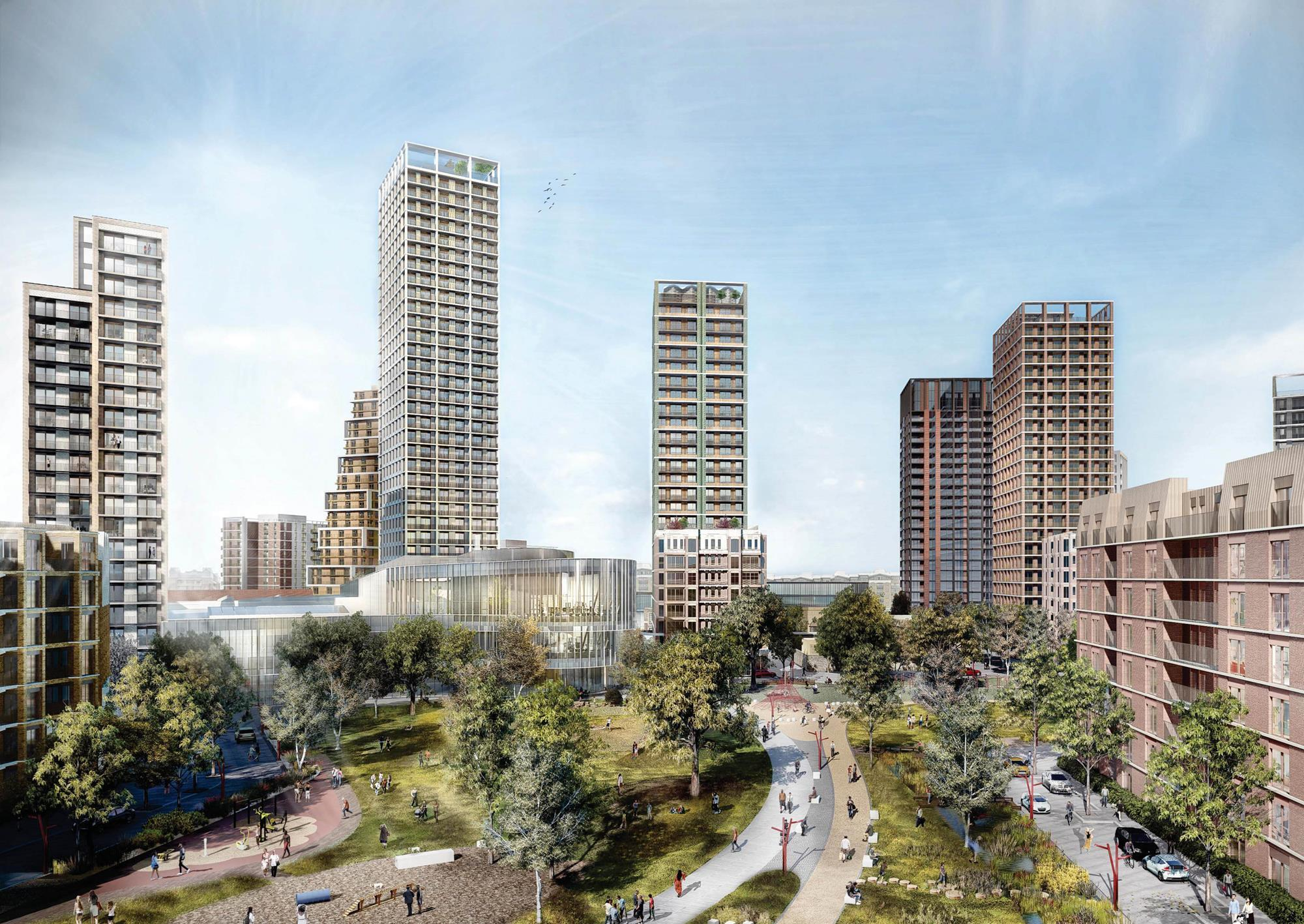
Proposed View of Estates after Regeneration

The first official sign of the intent to redevelop the estate was a 2014 resident's poll conducted by the council, in which 57% backed the demolition and redevelopment of all buildings except two tower-blocks. The council then initiated a formal bidding process in 2016, when Taylor Wimpey were then selected in 2017 to redevelop the estate in a £1 billion scheme by Wandsworth Council. Following recent developments, the regeneration proposal was officially approved by Wandsworth Council in February 2020 but still awaits final confirmation from London Mayor Sadiq Khan. Although the Mayor has campaigned against private council estate redevelopments that do not provide an acceptable level of replacement social housing and condemned a similar scheme in Battersea Power Station for those reasons, the outcome of this final review is still uncertain. Although work officially began in December 2018, this has mostly consisted of consultation and very minor demolitions. No construction has been completed and no residents have yet been relocated to temporary housing, as the scheme is not scheduled to be completed until 2030.

=== Media Coverage and Fears over Gentrification ===
The estate gained more attention for regeneration in 2016, where it was widely named as one of approximately 140 UK sink estates authorised for demolition. A limited number of residents (mostly in Ganley Court) have avowedly opposed demolition and renewal, objecting to the size of the 32-storey towers that are planned to replace the current Estates. Marsha De Cordova also raised fears over potential gentrification when she secured a debate in the Houses of Parliament on 22 March 2019, citing her fears over the lack of council homes in the new scheme (3 out of the extra 2,000 homes) with the then-Under-Secretary for Housing, Communities and Local Government Rishi Sunak choosing not to comment on the issue and praising the Conservative leadership of Wandsworth Council. The Architects for Social Housing group also pointed out that the regeneration of the Estates was led by Levitt Bernstein Architects, citing it as evidence of the company's inability to maintain previous numbers of council homes, accumulating to processes of social dispersion throughout London.

== In popular culture ==
The famous 1951 heist film The Lavender Hill Mob refers to Lavender Hill, a street directly opposite the estates from Grant Road, on the southern adjoining side of Clapham Junction. As previously mentioned, the 1965 film Up the Junction, directed by Ken Loach, shows many of the Victorian terraces that the Winstanley and York Road Estates replaced, along with some of the newer-build concrete blocks. Loach again used the estates and surrounding area as much of the backdrop for his 1966 drama Cathy Come Home and 1967 film Poor Cow, which similarly dealt with social issues and deprivation. The estates featured briefly in the background of the 1971 gangster thriller Villain in a shooting scene and, more prominently, in another gangster thriller of 1972, Sitting Target. The estates were also briefly seen in the background of the local 1973 film The Optimists of Nine Elms and 1975 thriller Brannigan.

== Notable residents ==
- So Solid Crew members.
- John Burns grew up in 80 Grant Road.
- Melodians Steel Orchestra UK members.
- Edward Adrian Wilson met his wife at Caius House and has a Blue Plaque at his former address on Vicarage Crescent.
- Alan Johnson spent his later childhood in a flat in Pitt House on Maysoule Road.
- Levi Roots formerly had a catering business on the estates.
- John Archer was a councillor for the Latchmere ward of the estates and has a blue plaque at his former address slightly beyond the estates on Brynmaer Road.
- MC Romeo
- Carl Morgan

== Works cited ==
- Latchmere Health Profile (2018), Wandsworth Borough Council, 2018
- Chalmin, Philippe, The Making of a Sugar Giant: Tate and Lyle, 1859-1989, Harwood Academic Publishers, 1990, Reading
- David, Elizabeth, Harvest of the Cold Months: The Social History of Ice and Ices, Faber & Faber, 2011
- Fuller, Michael, "Kill The Black One First": The most moving story you’ll read this year, 535 Books, 2019
- Guillery, Peter, Mobilising Housing Histories: Learning from London's Past for a Sustainable Future, RIBA Publishing, 2017, London
- Jeffreys, Margot, Mobility In The Labour Market: Employment Changes in Battersea and Dagenham, Routledge, 1954, Abingdon
- Johnson, Alan, This Boy- A Memoir of a Childhood, Bantam Press, 2013, London
- Klugmann, James, History of the Communist Party of Great Britain: Volume 1, Lawrence and Wishart, 1987, Vol. 1
- Lawrence, Jamie, From Prison to the Premiership - The Amazing True Story of Britain's Hardest Footballer, John Blake Publishing Ltd, 2006,
- Lansley, Stewart, Councils in Conflict: The Rise and Fall of the Municipal Left, Macmillan Education, 1989, Basingstoke
- Thom, Colin, Battersea- "Introduction", Survey of London, 2012–2013, Volume 49, Draft issue
- Thom, Colin, Battersea- "Chapter 8: North of Clapham Junction", Survey of London, 2012–2013, Volume 50, Draft issue
- Webb, Christine, The History of Battersea Grammar School to 1936- Chapter 6, The Old Grammarian, November 1979, Volume 8, Issue 3
