= Reggae (disambiguation) =

Reggae is a popular musical genre.

Reggae may also refer to:

- Reggae (album), a 1973 album by Herbie Mann
- Reggae, a Mega Man character
- "Reggae", a song by Black Midi from Schlagenheim

== See also ==
- Reggae Reggae Sauce
