= Melodians Steel Orchestra UK =

UK musical group

Melodians Steel Orchestra UK is a band formed in Harrow in October 1987 by Terrance "Terry" Noel MBE, composed of orchestra members using the steelpan instrument. They have since achieved considerable success in their musical and community endeavours, being well-recognised by various UK Governmental organisations (including the BBC), the Diplomatic Service and NGOs such as PRS for Music. The band has since assumed a status of national importance to modern British culture and has become symbolic of the importance of the relationship between the UK and the Commonwealth, particularly Trinidad and Tobago.

== Background ==
=== Steelpan culture in Trinidad and Tobago ===
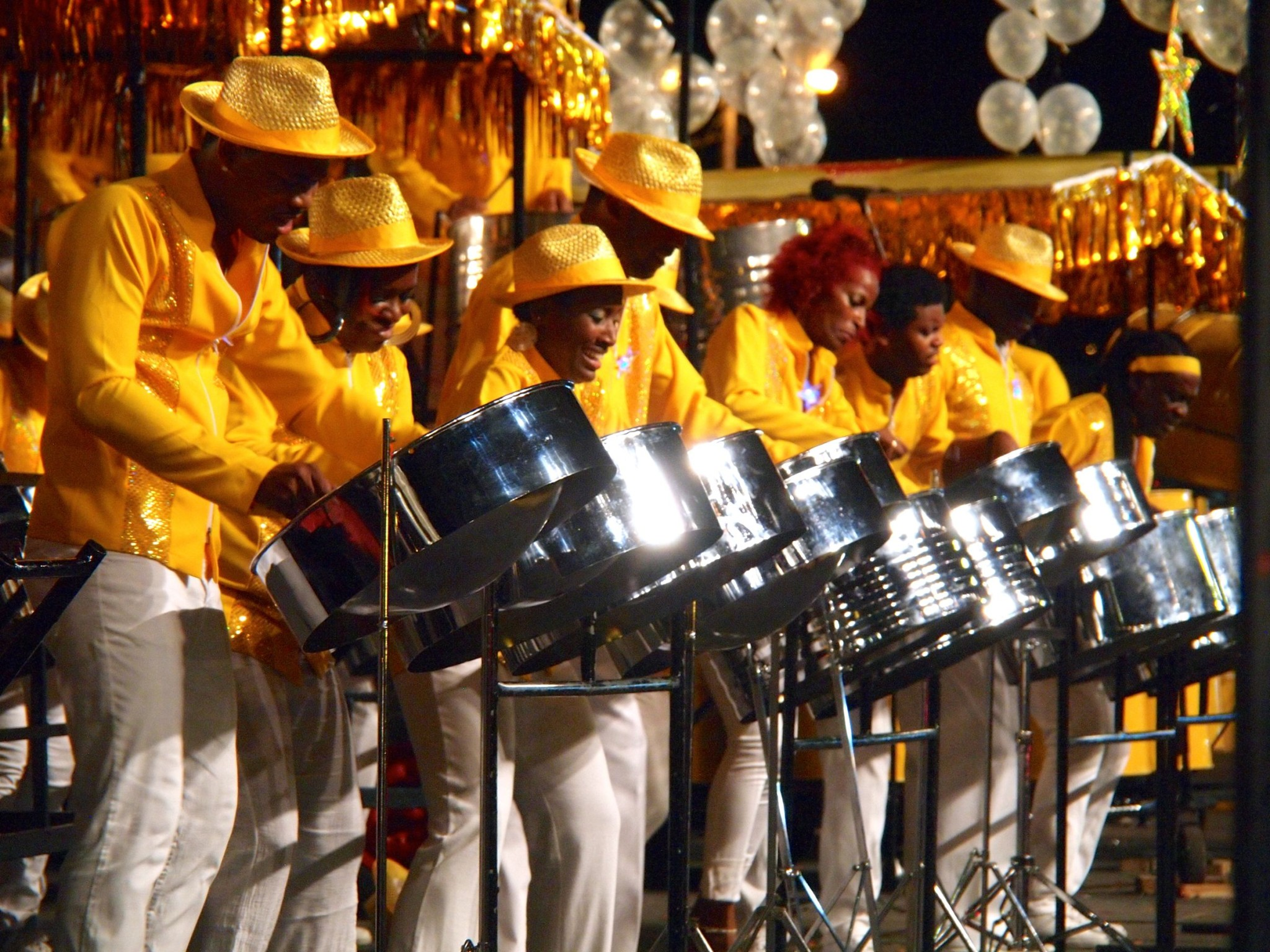
Steelpan Instruments at Trinidad and Tobago Carnival

The modern steelpan is one of the newest musical instruments created during 20th-century music. It was created on the Caribbean island of Trinidad and Tobago in the 1930s and began in the underground culture due to a ban by the British colonial government, being first popularised by players such as Elliot "Ellie" Mannette, the Oval Boys and the Woodbrook Invaders. There was a shift in attitudes towards steelband after the War, exemplified by the positive reception it received at the carnival of 1946 (the first allowed since the start of the war), in front of the then-governor and a series of initiatives between 1948 and 1950 to end "clashes" between rival groups.

=== Steelpan culture in the UK ===
Although it is uncertain at precisely which time the instrument first came to the UK or properly entered popular consciousness, there are a variety of origin stories for the growth of the movement in the UK. One such assertion is that the first UK Steel Orchestra began when Trinidadian soldiers who were stationed in London at the end of WWII (possibly in the Caribbean Regiment), joined in the celebrations by playing their instruments. However, it would also certainly seem that in many places in and outside London, that it was primarily the Windrush generation of musicians such as Lord Kitchener and other migrants from the Caribbean that were responsible for the growth of this instrument. By 1951, the government of Trinidad and Tobago had selected the Trinidad All-Steel Percussion Orchestra (containing Elliot Mannette, Sterling Betancourt and others) to represent the country at that year's Festival of Britain.

== Formation ==
=== Early history and inspiration ===
Fittingly, much of the inspiration for the band in the UK stemmed from the experiences of Terry Noel MBE during his time playing at the original Melodians Steel Orchestra in Arima, Trinidad. This earlier namesake was formed in 1953 and is renowned for its community work within the town and surrounding area. Terry Noel MBE then came to London in 1967 to train as a psychiatric nurse after a career in the Mounted Police. In 1975, he was instrumental in organising the first Adult Steelband Music Festival in London at the Commonwealth Institute, became a founding member and chairman of the Commonwealth Arts Association and founded an earlier Steel Orchestra "The Groovers", sponsored by British Airways. In 1976, he helped to set-up the Steelband Association of Great Britain (SAGB). The Groovers were also successful and recorded a CD in 1982 for Princess Diana, which was presented to her on the birth of her son Prince William.

=== Emergence of Melodians Steel Orchestra UK ===
Perhaps rediscovering an affinity for more explicitly Trinidadian and Tobagonian culture after a year's sabbatical in Trinidad, Terry Noel returned to London in 1987 and founded The Melodians Steel Orchestra UK in September–October of that year. The band then increased their abilities to recruit and expand by gaining BT as a national sponsor, briefly becoming known as the BT Melodians Steel Orchestra (BTMSO). He further promoted the movement by founding the Steel Advisory Service in the UK in April 1988, an organisation intended to assist those that would like to create their own steelbands. The newer Melodians have maintained close links with the historic group, exemplified by a member of the earlier Arima band- Robert Thompson- writing the "Commonwealth Melody" which the UK band performed at the Commonwealth Day Service in Westminster Abbey on 9 March 2020.

== Membership ==
=== Players ===
Due to the pans within the Steel Orchestra needing to act as guitars, cellos and bass, sometimes along with instruments like maracas, cowbells and tambourines in the rhythm section, a broad array of players, specialities and skills are required. Although the band was understandably initially composed mainly of British Afro-Caribbeans, particularly those with strong links to Trinidad and Tobago, the band has always been welcoming and contained a diverse spectrum of people. Indeed, the scope of ages (from 12–60), races and backgrounds of players associated with the band today are unprecedented and the band has managed to retain its loyal British Trinidadian and Tobagonian membership, whilst attracting ensemble members united in their appreciation for Trinidadian culture.

=== Location ===
Although the band did, does and will contain participants throughout the London area and beyond, it does maintain especially strong ties to South London and areas predominantly within the boroughs of Wandsworth and Lambeth. Michael Fuller, the first Black Chief constable, Commander and Deputy assistant commissioner within the UK, wrote about his encounter with the Melodians by Clapham Junction during his tenure at Battersea Police Station in the late 1990s. He asserted that they had a particularly strong link to the Winstanley and York Road Estates area, as many of the members "lived on the estate". The band also practices at Henry Cavendish School in the area of Balham that falls into the London Borough of Lambeth.

== Community initiatives ==
The Melodians have been a registered charity (number 1036904) since 1994, responsible for a wide range of cultural, ambassadorial, educational and social programs to try and benefit a wide involvement of communities. One of the most notable and long-standing partnerships that the band has is with the Henry Cavendish Primary School, where the band has agreed to provide music lessons for the pupils due to practising at the site. Michael Fuller wrote of his admiration for their community outreach work in the Winstanley and York Road Estates in the late 1990s, which inspired him to direct increased municipal funding towards them and convincing him that "its rising star .... coincided and perhaps contributed something to the area's change". The Melodians also introduced steelpans to Northern Ireland at Harpurs Hill Junior School in Coleraine and organised for a Catholic and Protestant Junior School to play together at a junior festival in Barbados in October 2000 to encourage unity during the Peace Process. Terry was also awarded the Community Centre and Culture award from the Royal Chartered Borough of Arima in 2008 due to his promotion of steelband participation around the world. However, probably the highest honour that the leader of the group has received was his MBE for services to Music and Community Involvement from the Queen at Buckingham Palace in 2015.

== Recognition and awards ==
As previously mentioned, the group's pre-eminent status within the UK steelpan community has meant that it has enjoyed considerable success over the years, not least with the award of an MBE for its leader in 2015. Due to the entrepreneurial spirit and resilience of the group it is also vital to recognise some of the group accolades that have been bestowed upon it. These include: Two Performing Rights Society Enterprise Awards, Her Majesty the Queens's 40th anniversary Royal Anniversary Challenge Award and a BT Innovation Award.

== Projects and performances ==
Although the number of performances that the band has participated in since their inception would be impossible to fully record, they have a long and proud history of ambassadorial and ceremonial performances. Domestic examples are their performances: for 15 years consecutively in the Royal Variety Show at the Albert Hall, at the Queen's 40th Anniversary, the BBC's first-ever virtual Orchestra in 2016 and the Commonwealth Melody during Commonwealth Day Service on 9 March 2020 at Westminster Abbey. The band have been described as ambassadors for modern British Culture by envoys and have played in over 30 countries around the world in the service of the British Government's cultural outreach programmes. They have also performed at London Art Night in both 2018 and 2019. Terry Noel also has a long-standing association with Clayground Collective as "a champion bearer of clay to London", a company awarded for “Engaging new and diverse audiences and passing on Craft Skills” by Creative and Cultural Skills in 2013.

== Features in film and media ==
The Melodians have produced many CDs since their formation, all available for purchase on their website and the internet in general. Terry Noel's precursor to the Melodians, "the Groovers", also recorded a CD for Princess Diana, which was presented to her on the birth of her son Prince William in 1982. One of their most ground-breaking recent collaborations was with 2004 Turner Prize Winner Jeremy Deller for the soundtrack of his film "English Magic" in 2013. The film was recorded for a British Council exhibition and represented Britain's entry during the competition of the 55th Venice Biennale.
