= Levi Roots =

British-Jamaican musician and chef (born 1958)

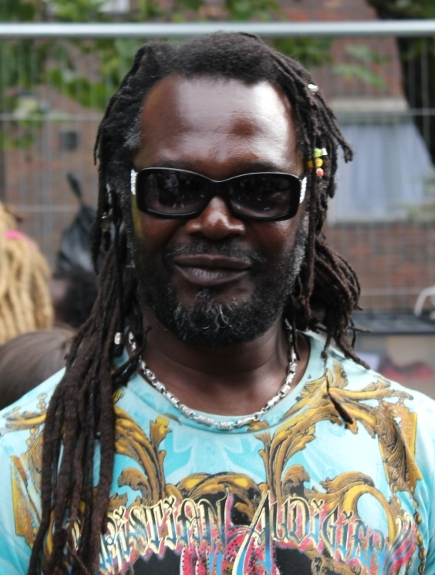
- Roots at Notting Hill Carnival in 2010
- Born: Keith Valentine Graham; 24 June 1958 (age 68); Clarendon, Jamaica
- Occupations: Businessman; musician; television personality; author; chef; radio presenter
- Years active: 1982–present
- Known for: Reggae Reggae Sauce, Roots Reggae artist
- Children: 8
- Website: Official site

Keith Valentine Graham (born 24 June 1958), better known as Levi Roots, is a Jamaican-British businessman, celebrity chef, musician, television personality, author, and radio presenter. He came to prominence on the fourth series of the British TV show Dragons' Den where he successfully pitched his Reggae Reggae Sauce. According to the Sunday Times Rich List, Roots is worth an estimated £30 million.

== Early life ==
Roots was born in Clarendon, Jamaica. He was raised by his grandmother after his parents moved to the United Kingdom, until he joined them at age 11. He was raised as a Christian, but converted to the Rastafari faith aged 18.

== Career ==
=== Music ===
In 1981 Levi Roots cut the social consciousness roots rockers discomix Voice of the Poor-Poor Man Story with Fred Locks and Creation Steppers, whilst at the same time, making a name for himself in the roots reggae sound system world by chanting on the mic and selecting for Lloyd Coxsone sound. Later, he made a significant breakthrough in the reggae outernational by cutting tunes like Free your Mind with Fashion Records A-Class studio sound engineer Gussie P, Robbie Shakespeare, Bubblers, Ansell Collins, Mafia & Fluxy, Ruff Cutt, Sylvia Tella, and the Tenyue brothers, releasing a discomix of that tune which Jah Shaka sound played out regularly in 1997.

Roots has performed with James Brown and Maxi Priest and was nominated for a Best Reggae Act MOBO award in 1998. He was a friend of Bob Marley when he resided in the UK and performed "Happy Birthday Mr. President" for Nelson Mandela in 1996 on his trip to Brixton.

=== Reggae Reggae Sauce ===
Levi Roots' Reggae Reggae Sauce is a jerk barbecue sauce. In 2006, 4,000 bottles of the sauce were sold at the Notting Hill Carnival.

He later took the sauce to a food trade show, where he was spotted by a BBC producer who approached him to appear on Dragons' Den. He appeared in the first episode of the fourth series in February 2007, seeking £50,000 of investment from the Dragons in return for a 20% equity stake in Reggae Reggae Sauce. Despite erroneously claiming that he had an order for 2.5 million litres of the sauce (when in fact the order was for 2,500 kilograms), he was offered the £50,000 for a 40% stake in his business by Peter Jones and Richard Farleigh. Shortly after his appearance on the programme, Sainsbury's announced that they would be stocking the sauce in 600 of their stores.

Roots claimed that the sauce recipe had been passed down to him by his grandmother. After being accused of stealing the recipe from a former friend and business partner, he said that he invented it himself and that the claimed family history was a marketing ploy.

=== Restaurants ===
Roots' first London restaurant, the Papine Jerk Centre, was on the Winstanley Estate in Battersea, Clapham Junction from 2010–2012. His children worked alongside him. The shop provided a lunchtime service to a local school, Thames Christian College. In December 2015, Roots opened his first franchise restaurant in Westfield Stratford City. It closed in 2019.

=== Books and television ===
Levi Roots' Reggae Reggae Cookbook was published in 2008, by HarperCollins, with a foreword by Roots' investor, Peter Jones. The book has chapters on Roots' story of coming to London and an introduction to Caribbean ingredients. To coincide with the release of his recipe book, Roots appeared on the 3 June 2008 episode of BBC's Ready Steady Cook as a celebrity. He achieved second place against Lesley Waters.

Roots had a television cooking show, Caribbean Food Made Easy, on BBC2, with a book of the same name published in August 2009. The show followed Roots as he travelled the UK and Jamaica demonstrating easy ways to cook Caribbean food at home.

Roots appeared on Celebrity Mastermind in 2010, coming second with 13 points. He also appeared on Big Brother, where he cooked a Caribbean barbecue for the housemates. Roots also made a special appearance in the 2011 urban comedy film Anuvahood where he plays himself. On 22 February 2018 he appeared in the 8th episode of the 7th series of the BBC detective programme Death in Paradise. He played the part of Billy Springer.

Roots entered the twenty-third series of Celebrity Big Brother on 4 March 2024 and was evicted on 15 March 2024, along with fellow celebrity Ekin-Su Cülcüloğlu, after spending 11 days in the house.

== Personal life ==
When he appeared on BBC Radio 4's Desert Island Discs Roots said that his relationship with his father had been a difficult one, because his father was "a bit of a stranger."

Roots has eight children with seven mothers.

Roots has been arrested twice. Aged 15 he was sent to Pentonville Prison for six months, charged with assault on a police officer. In 1986, police raided the youth club he ran, and he was convicted again for possession of drugs.

Roots was appointed Chair of St Pauls Carnival in Bristol in 2021.

Roots became Patron of RIFT Social Enterprise in May 2024, a not-for-profit organisation which supports people with convictions and the long-term unemployed entering into self-employment.

Roots is a twice honorary doctor with the University of the West of England and the University of Westminster.
