= Kent Police =

English territorial police force

Agency overview
- Formed: 14 January 1857; 169 years ago (as Kent County Constabulary)
- Employees: 6,971
- Volunteers: 232
- Annual budget: £568.5 million (2026/27)

Jurisdictional structure
- Operations jurisdiction: Kent
- Map of Kent Police's jurisdiction
- Area: 1,433 square miles (3,710 km^{2})
- Population: 1.8 million
- Legal jurisdiction: England and Wales
- Constituting instrument: Police Act 1996
- General nature: Local civilian police

Operational structure
- Overseen by: His Majesty's Inspectorate of Constabulary and Fire & Rescue Services; Independent Office for Police Conduct
- Headquarters: Maidstone, Kent, England
- Constables: 4,357 (including 189 special constables) (March 2026)
- Police Community Support Officers: 100 (March 2026)
- Police and Crime Commissioner responsible: Matthew Scott
- Agency executives: Tim Smith, Chief Constable; Peter Ayling, Deputy Chief Constable
- Areas: 3

Facilities
- Stations: 20 police stations and offices with public access (6 of which contain active custody suites). Plus two special stations.

Website
- www.kent.police.uk

Kent Police is the territorial police force responsible for policing the 1,433 sq mi (3,710 km^{2}) and approximately 1.8 million inhabitants of Kent, a county in South East England.

== History ==
On 14 January 1857, a 222-strong 'Kent County Constabulary' was formed under Chief Constable John Henry Hay Ruxton. The first headquarters was at Wrens Cross, Stone Street, Maidstone, and was rented for use by the police until 23 November 1860, when the force purchased it for £1,200. It was responsible for policing those parts of the county not already under the jurisdiction of local Borough police forces.

In 1860, the initial uniform of a frock coat and a high hat was replaced by a long uniform tunic and shako hat, and constables were issued with a rattle and truncheon. In 1885, whistles were introduced. In 1897, the recognisable custodian helmet was introduced. In 1974, the familiar Cox Comb helmet replaced the Rose Top helmet with a new helmet plate.

On 1 April 1889, Kent County Constabulary absorbed the borough police forces of Deal, Hythe, Faversham, Sandwich, and Tenterden, five of the fourteen local police forces that then policed boroughs within the county of Kent. The remaining nine were absorbed on 1 April 1943, these being the borough forces of Dover, Folkestone, Gravesend, Maidstone, Margate, Ramsgate, and Tunbridge Wells, together with the Canterbury City Police, and the Rochester City Police. Ruxton retired on 14 August 1894 and died on 20 April 1897.

Kent County Constabulary purchased 20 bicycles in 1896, a number which rose to 129 by 1904. Telephones were given to village police constables in 1925 and by 1931, 29 motorcycles had been introduced, along with one police car. The constabulary employed horses until 1943, when the last was retired.

In 1965, the force had an establishment of 1,988 attested constables and an actual strength of 1,766, making it the third largest county force in Great Britain.

Kent County Constabulary was the last British force to keep the word "county" in its official title. It changed its name to Kent Police in 2002. The main argument for the change was that the large number of visitors coming through the Channel Tunnel and the ports would understand the word "Police" more readily than "Constabulary".

Kent Police was the first force in the United Kingdom to be led by a black chief constable, Michael Fuller, who held the role from 2004 to 2010.

After 1940, Kent Police HQ was situated at Sutton Road, Maidstone. but announced in 2020 that the HQ was no longer providing value for money and would be sold. The Chief Officer team has now relocated to North Kent Police Station in Northfleet Kent Police College is located on Coverdale Avenue, Maidstone. Kent Police museum is located in Faversham Police Station.

After years of personnel cuts announced in 2010 and starting in 2011, that saw officer numbers fall from a peak of almost 3,800 in 2010 to under 3,200 by 2016, it was announced in March 2018 that Kent Police would launch the largest recruitment campaign in its history aiming to recruit over 200 more officers over the next one to two years. This was made possible due to an increase in the tax funding the police receive from county residents. The campaign was successful with over 200 officers recruited in 2018 and 2019 bringing the force to over 3,400 officers.

It was further announced in January 2019 that the PCC Matthew Scott was proposing another tax increase in the 2019/20 period in the amount of money Kent Police receive from county residents in order to recruit a further 180 officers by 2020. This proposal was approved and increased the number of officers in the force to over 3,600 by 2020.

As part of the national campaign announced by the government in late 2019 to recruit 20,000 more police officers across all of the 43 police forces in England and Wales by early 2023 it was announced that Kent would receive government funding to recruit 147 officers in the first wave of 6,000 in 2020 with the other 14,000 expected in 2021 and 2022. Additional funding for 34 more officers was also underwritten by the police crime commissioner bringing the total number of extra funded officers in 2020 to 181. This increased the number of officers to over 3,800 by 2021. Under current plans the total number of officers is expected to increase to over 4,100 by March 2023 giving Kent Police its largest number of officers ever since the force was formed.

=== Chief constables ===
From 1857 to present:

- Captain John Henry Hay Ruxton – 1 April 1857 to August 1894
- Major Henry Edwards – 1894 to 1895
- Lt.Col Henry Warde – 1895 to 1921
- Major Harry Ernest Chapman – January 1921 to 1940
- Captain J A Davison – 1940 to 1942
- Sir Percy Sillitoe – 1943 to 1946
- Major John Ferguson – 1946 to 1958
- Lt. Col Geoffrey White – 1958 to 1962
- Richard Dawnay Lemon – April 1962 to 1974
- Barry Pain – 1974 to 1982
- Frank Jordan – 1982 to 1989
- Paul Condon – 1989 to 1993
- Sir (John) David Phillips – 1993 to 2003
- Robert Ayling – 1 April 2003 to 5 January 2004
- Michael Fuller – 5 January 2004 to 16 February 2010
- Ian Learmonth – 5 July 2010 to 4 January 2014
- Alan Pughsley – 4 January 2014 to 3 October 2022
- Tim Smith – 6 December 2022 to present.

=== Officers killed in the line of duty or while reporting for duty ===
The Police Roll of Honour Trust and Police Memorial Trust list and commemorate all British police officers killed in the line of duty. Since its establishment in 1984, the Police Memorial Trust has erected 50 memorials nationally to some of those officers.

The following members of Kent Police are listed on the Roll of Honour:

- PC Israel May - Died 24 August 1873, aged 37 - Beaten with his own truncheon while attempting to arrest a drunken man.
- PC John Harryman - Died 29 May 1907, aged 29 - Killed by a railway engine while guarding the line for the royal train.
- PC John Truphet Saywell - Died 1 October 1910, aged 35 - Died during an operation on an injury inflicted during a disturbance.
- DS George Henry Apps - Died 7 June 1916, aged 34 - Died of injuries received on duty in 1915 when knocked down by a car.
- PC Charles William Walker - Died 21 July 1924, aged 51 - Died of injuries received on duty when he was knocked down by a cyclist.
- PC Edwin James Longhurst - Died 8 February 1928, aged 44 - Fatally injured cycling on duty when knocked down by a bus in Canterbury.
- PC Ernest F. Bradley - Died 18 August 1928, aged 27 - Fatally injured on motorcycle patrol in a collision with another motorcycle.
- PC Albert Cox - Died 20 December 1930, aged 40 - Died of injuries sustained in January 1930 in a cycling accident on duty.
- RPC Charles William Haines - Died 20 September 1940, aged 65 - Fatally injured when struck by a car cycling back to his station in an air raid.
- PC Thomas James Farrell - Died 1 November 1940, aged 38 -Killed during an enemy air raid when bomb splinters pierced his helmet.
- PWRC Herbert James Chittenden - Died 1 January 1942, aged 41 - Killed when his police motorcycle struck the kerb and overturned.
- PC Stephen George James Huggins - Died 31 October 1942, aged 37 - Fatally injured by a bullet from an enemy aircraft during an air raid.
- PWRC Reginald Walter Dowling - Died 8 April 1943, aged 49 - Died of injuries received in June 1942 during an air raid at Canterbury.
- Killed in enemy air raids off duty or duty status unknown (World War II) between 1940 & 1945 – S/Insp George Moore, SC John Olive, PWRC Henry Kettle, PC Ronald Parker, S/Sgt Reginald John Rogers, SC Arthur Edward Potten, SC Ernest Albert Farrow, SC Frederick Walter Heine, SC Richard Daniel Jay Wills, PC Cecil George Constable, PMS Edward John Toomey, SC William George Warner, S/Sgt William Albert Bransby, SC George Ernest Russell, PC Sydney Russell, SC Harry Thomas R. Pankhurst, PWRC Frederick Chapman, Sgt William George Braddick, SC Frederick James Collard, PWRC Albert Robert Gibling, SC Robert Wheeler, Sgt William George Dickinson, SC Frederick Johnson
- PC Frank Skewis - Died 8 January 1949, aged 49 - Killed when accidentally struck by a car while rounding up stray horses.
- PC Alan George Baxter - Died 5 June 1951, aged 33 - Fatally wounded when shot by a gunman being sought by police.
- PC Hubert Stanley Pay - Died 4 November 1951, aged 25 -Fatally injured travelling to work when his motorcycle hit a lorry.
- T/Sgt Gerald Thomas P. Rooney - Died 14 March 1956, aged 24 - Shot dead by terrorists, on duty with the British Police Unit in Cyprus.
- PC Peter W. Child - Died 27 January 1964, aged 27 - Killed on a driving course when the police car he was in crashed.
- PC Robert Archibald Beattie - Died 5 July 1965, aged 41 - and
- PC Robert Alfred John Knight - Died 5 July 1965, aged 29 - Killed when their patrol car was hit head-on by a car on the motorway.
- PC George Craig - Died 21 May 1967, aged 36 - Killed on motorcycle patrol when he ran into an unlit lorry at night.
- PC Phillip Alan Long - Died 28 June 1968, aged 22 - Fatally injured in a road accident while on motorcycle patrol.
- DC Roger Gardiner - Died 26 May 1972, aged 36 - Killed while driving a police vehicle when he lost control and hit a tree.
- PC Malcolm John Boakes - Died 21 October 1973, aged 31 - Killed while travelling to duty when a load fell off a lorry onto their car.
- PC John Francis Ryan - Died 21 October 1973, aged 33 - Killed while travelling to duty when a load fell off a lorry onto their car.
- DS Charles Edward Brisley - Died 20 April 1978, aged 47 - Fatally injured when struck by a lorry trailer on duty in Folkestone harbour.
- Sgt George Frederick Matthew - Died 16 June 1983, aged 42 - Killed on motorcycle patrol when his machine collided with a lorry.
- PC Duncan Watts Clift - Died 24 March 1991, aged 27 - Run down and fatally injured trying to stop a stolen car while off duty.
- PC Alexander Gordon Doe - Died 18 May 1993, aged 44 - Killed on an advanced motorcycle course when his machine crashed.
- PC Jonathan Bruce Odell - Died 19 December 2000, age 30 - Run down and killed by a speeding vehicle he was attempting to stop.
- PC Katie Louise Mitchell - Died 3 October 2007, age 39 - Killed in a motorcycle accident while travelling to duty at Tonbridge.
- PC Phillip Edward Pratt - Died 14 June 2009, aged 26 - Killed when struck by a vehicle while protecting the scene of an accident.
- DS Terry Easterby - Died 25 February 2011, aged 44 - Died in a motorcycle collision while travelling to report for duty at Medway.
- PC Bradley Corke - Died 21 March 2026, aged 27 - Involved in fatal collision whereby him and his partner were struck by another vehicle while responding to an emergency near Swanley

== Organisation ==
In 2010, it was decided the force's six BCUs would be reduced to three.

- North Division: North Kent district (Dartford district, Gravesham district), Medway district, Swale district.
- East Division: Canterbury district, Thanet district, Dover district, Ashford district, Folkestone and Hythe district.
- West Division: Maidstone district, Tunbridge Wells district, Tonbridge and Malling district, Sevenoaks district.

Each district has a Local Policing Team for emergency and non-emergency response as well as a Community Safety Unit, a Community Policing Team, and Police Community Support Officers. Kent Police operates the following police stations and offices with public access: Ashford, Canterbury, Cranbrook, Dartford, Dover, Faversham, Folkestone, Gravesend, Herne Bay, Maidstone, Margate, Medway (Gillingham), North Kent (Northfleet), Rainham, Ramsgate, Sevenoaks, Sheerness, Sittingbourne, Swanley, Tonbridge, and Tunbridge Wells. Police stations in Canterbury, Folkestone, Maidstone, Margate, Medway, North Kent, and Tonbridge also have custody suites, Divisional Support Units, Criminal Investigation departments and Missing Child and Exploitation Teams.

Canterbury custody has 15 cells, Folkestone custody has 15 cells, Maidstone custody has 17 cells, Margate custody has 13 cells, Medway custody has 40 cells, North Kent custody has 40 cells, and Tonbridge custody has 19 cells. Maidstone custody closed in October 2025. Each division has a Crime Squad and a County Lines and Gangs Team, all of which form the Chief Constable's Crime Squad. The Professional Standards Department and the Paedophile Online Investigation Team are county wide teams. The Serious Crime Directorate handles all of the force's major crime investigations and is jointly shared with Essex Police.

Additionally, Kent Police operates a station at the Bluewater shopping centre with a small three-cell custody suite and a station at Longport near the Channel Tunnel as a dedicated TACT custody suite with four cells. Kent Police is unique in that it operates a station outside of the UK, in Coquelles, France. This will be retained through Brexit.

The Port of Dover maintains its own independent police force, the Port of Dover Police, but Kent Police has statutory responsibility for policing the entire county and takes over investigations of incidents within the port when appropriate.

In addition to the three geographical divisions, the Tactical Operations division, or 'Tac Ops', comprises the Roads Policing Unit (RPU), Road Safety Unit (RSU), Commercial Vehicle Unit (CVU), Serious Collision Investigation Unit (SCIU), Armed Response, Dog Section, Rural Task Force (RTF), Gypsy Liaison Team (GLT), Search and Marine Unit (SMU), and Proactive Tasking Team (PTT). 'Tac Ops' are mainly based at Kent Police Tactical Operations, known as 'Coldharbour' due to its proximity to Coldharbour Lane, Aylesford, and Nackington Police Station in Canterbury. In 2011, the Search and Marine Unit moved from 'Coldharbour' to Sheerness Docks in order to be closer to the water. In 2000, Kent Police opened kennels in Stockbury to be used as a permanent base and training centre for the Dog Section.

The force is supported by the National Police Air Service, the nearest aircraft operate from Redhill, Surrey and North Weald, Essex. Kent Police has a number of qualified drone pilots.

=== Gallery ===
Ford Focus pictured in 2026

Volkswagen Touareg pictured in 2026

Vauxhall Vivaro pictured in 2025

Skoda Superb pictured in 2026

== PEEL inspection 2022 ==
His Majesty's Inspectorate of Constabulary and Fire & Rescue Services (HMICFRS) conducts a periodic police effectiveness, efficiency and legitimacy (PEEL) inspection of each police service's performance. In its latest PEEL inspection, Kent Police was rated as follows:

	Outstanding	Good	Adequate	Requires Improvement	Inadequate
2021/22 rating	Recording data about crime	Preventing crime; Treatment of the public; Developing a positive workplace; Good use of resources	Protecting vulnerable people	Investigating crime; Responding to the public; Managing offenders	

== Senior management ==
As of April 2025:

- Kent Police and Crime Commissioner – Matthew Scott
- Chief constable – Tim Smith
- Deputy chief constable – DCC Peter Ayling. Responsible for: operational delivery and performance, performance management and professional standards.
- Assistant chief constable – ACC Tracy Quiller. Responsible for: Tactical Operations, Force Control Room, and Counter-Terrorism Policing. (Temporary)
- Assistant chief constable – ACC Nigel Brookes. Responsible for: Local Policing
- Assistant chief constable – ACC Andrew Pritchard. Responsible for: Kent and Essex Serious Crime Directorate.
- Assistant chief constable – ACC Simon Wilson. Responsible for: Crime.

== Television ==
Kent Police has featured in numerous television programmes and fly on the wall documentaries. These include Street Wars, which featured the Medway 'tac team', Night Cops which featured officers from Thanet and Canterbury during night shifts, and ITV's Cops with Cameras which featured the force's Roads Policing Unit on motorway patrol.

In 2010, Kent Police appeared in two episodes of Coppers, series 1. Episode 1 focused on the custody suite at Medway Police station, while episode 3 focused on 999 emergency calls received by Kent Police.

In 2019, a three-part Channel 5 documentary, Manhunt: Catch Me If You Can, featured the force's Gypsy Liaison Team, referred to in the show as the 'Specialist Tactical Unit', as they hunted down and arrested some of the county's high priority outstanding suspects, or 'red' offenders. Camera crews for the show inadvertently captured three members of the team entering a property in Walderslade and searching for a wanted arsonist without a warrant or grounds to do so, as well as one of them subsequently verbally abusing the occupants. Although the footage wasn't broadcast, it was shown to a Kent Police misconduct panel and the abusive officer was given a written warning.

In 2021, a three-part Channel 4 documentary, Undercover Police: Hunting Paedophiles, will follow investigations conducted by the force's Paedophile Online Investigation Team as well as officers from the Eastern Region Special Operations Unit. On 15 April 2019, 49-year-old Russell Cordes from Dover returned to his home to find detectives searching his address and a camera crew for the show filming outside after indecent images of children were downloaded from his IP address. Cordes failed to show up for a voluntary interview at Canterbury Police Station the following day and PCSOs subsequently found him dead at his home on 18 April; his death was a suicide. Cordes' family claimed at the inquest into his death that the officers had 'blood on their hands' and that the camera crew being present was a 'catalyst' to his death. The Independent Office for Police Conduct (IOPC) cleared Kent Police of wrongdoing but did suggest the force should review the policy of allowing camera crews to accompany officers, footage relating to Cordes will not feature in the show.

The force has appeared a number times in the BBC documentary Critical Incident. The show has featured an incident during which a Kent Police officer was knocked over and injured by a dangerous driver, an officer being attacked with a knife in an address in Ashford, firearms officers pursuing a vehicle, and officers using their belts to rescue a man dangling in Northfleet Quarry.

Officers from the Serious Crime Directorate discussed the 2013 murder of Anne-Marie Birch in the BBC documentary Love You to Death: A Year of Domestic Violence, and the Sarah Wellgreen case the Sky documentary Killer in my Village.

Kent Police detectives and officers were featured arresting numerous fraud suspects in an episode of the ITV show Tonight entitled "Fraud: The Public Threat".

== Noteworthy incidents ==
Operation Stack, and more recently Operation Brock have been implemented numerous times over the years by Kent Police under the Civil Contingencies Act 2004. Both manage HGV traffic in the event of disruption at the Port of Dover or the Channel Tunnel but remain highly controversial tactics.

On 4 July 1996, Lin Russell, her daughters Megan and Josie, and their dog were attacked with a hammer in Chillenden. Only Josie survived and, in 2001, Michael Stone was convicted of the two murders. Numerous appeals against his conviction have since failed despite claims that serial killer Levi Bellfield may instead have been responsible.

On 28 Aug 2001, serving Kent Police officer Karl Bluestone murdered his wife and two of his four children before committing suicide at his home in Gravesend.

In Feb of 2006, Kent Police investigated the 'Securitas' robbery, during which a gang of six stole approximately £53 million from a Securitas depot in Tonbridge. The gang received over 100 years in prison between them and £21 million has never been recovered, the incident remains the largest cash robbery in the UK to date.

On 11 June 2007, Kent Police shot and killed Anne Sanderson after she pointed what was later identified as an air pistol towards armed officers in Sevenoaks. An inquest in 2010 returned a verdict of lawful killing.

In November 2007, Kent Police and Essex Police began a search of serial killer Peter Tobin's former home in Irvine Drive, Margate. Two bodies were located, recovered, and later identified as those of Vicky Hamilton, who went missing from Falkirk in February 1991, and Dinah McNicol, who went missing from Tillingham in August 1991. Tobin was convicted in December 2008 for murdering Hamilton and convicted in December 2009 for murdering McNicol.

On 29 December 2007, Kent Police shot and killed Dayniel Tucker after he pointed what was later identified as a plastic Uzi towards armed officers in Stansted. An inquest jury found that Tucker had been lawfully killed.

On 26 November 2009, Kent Police shot and wounded Tomas Uptas after he threatened members of the public in the street with what was later identified as a BB gun and then pointed it towards armed officers in a supermarket in Canterbury. Kent Police later found the body of Loreta Raupiene in a nearby flat, Uptas was convicted of her murder in August 2010.

On the morning of 5 September 2013, thick fog on the Sheppey Crossing resulted in approximately 130 vehicles piling up. Two hundred injured people were triaged at the scene by South East Coast Ambulance Service and 35 were taken to hospitals in Medway, Ashford, Margate, Maidstone, Canterbury, and London. Eight of these were seriously injured and five had to be cut free from their cars by Kent Fire and Rescue Service. No one was killed but the incident remains the worst of its kind since a 160-car pile-up killed three people on the M42 in March 1997. Thirty two drivers were offered driver improvement courses as an alternative to prosecution by Kent Police.

On 8 February 2015, Kent Police shot and wounded Marc Traylor after he stabbed and wounded his daughter, Kitanna Traylor, during a psychotic episode at their home in Hersden.

On 2 May 2016, Kent Police shot and killed William Smith after he pointed a single-barrelled shotgun towards armed officers in Goudhurst when they tried to arrest him for murdering Roy Blackman at his home in Biddenden earlier that year. An inquest into the shooting concluded with a verdict that Smith had been lawfully killed.

In October 2018, Kent Police began a search for the missing mother of five Sarah Wellgreen. Her ex-partner Ben Lacomba was convicted of her murder in 2019. Wellgreen's body has not been located as of December 2021.
