= Reggae Reggae Sauce =

Brand of barbecue sauce

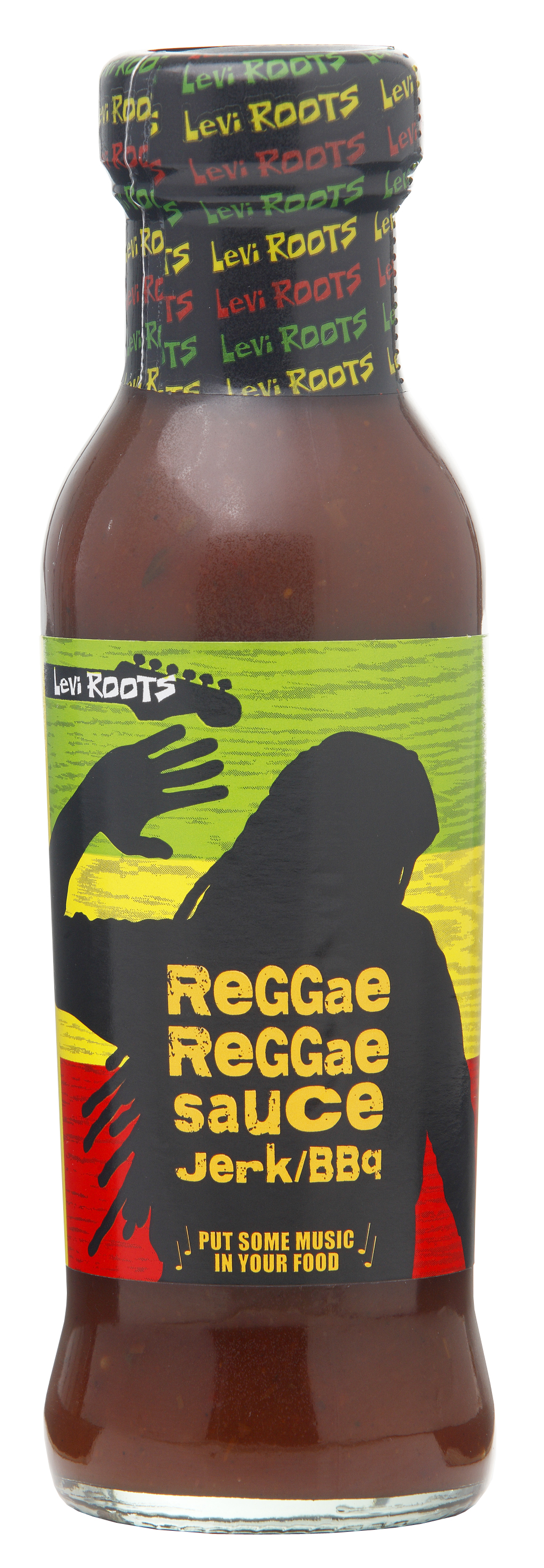
2011 Levi Roots Reggae Reggae Sauce bottle

Reggae Reggae Sauce is a barbecue sauce that incorporates Jamaican jerk spice. It was popularised by the creator Levi Roots's appearance on BBC Two's Dragons' Den, on which he used a song to sell his product.

Dragons' Den investor Peter Jones has since classified the product as one of his most successful investments from the show. He also used his contacts to introduce Roots and his products to buyers.

== History ==
On 7 February 2007, Roots appeared on Dragons' Den and convinced Peter Jones and Richard Farleigh to invest £50,000 in return for 40% of his company. The sauce gained fame as a result of his memorable television appearance and on 9 February 2007, Sainsbury's were confirmed to be interested in stocking it. On 7 March 2007, the sauce went on sale nationwide.

Roots released an accompanying single of his "Reggae Reggae Sauce Song" which he sang whilst pitching his product on Dragons' Den, and also on Harry Hill's TV Burp. The song was released as a download with proceeds going to Comic Relief. In September 2008, Reggae Reggae Sauce was voted as a CoolBrand by a panel of experts and the British public.

== Legal dispute over origins ==
The origin of the recipe is disputed by Tony Bailey, who runs a West Indian takeaway in Brixton, South London. In 2010, Bailey filed a preliminary claim in the High Court for more than £300,000 claiming that, as the inventor of the sauce, he was entitled to a share of profits. Roots ran a jerk chicken stall at the Notting Hill Carnival for 15 years with Bailey. Roots gave evidence to the High Court and admitted that previous claims made by him on Dragons Den and in marketing for his product, including the claim that the recipe was his grandmother's, were untrue.

Judge Mark Pelling QC dismissed Bailey's claims for breach of contract and breach of confidence. He told the court: "This was a dishonest claim, dishonestly advanced." No evidence had been offered to support Bailey's claim that he was the original inventor of the sauce. Lawyers said they estimated the legal battle had cost more than £1m in total and the judge said Roots was entitled to have his costs paid.

== Production and expansion ==
Reggae Reggae Sauce is manufactured by AB World Foods, a division of Associated British Foods.

Despite Roots saying he wanted production of his sauce to continue in the UK, production moved from Wales to Poland in March 2007.

Initially the sauce was carried exclusively in Sainsbury's supermarkets but now many supermarkets in the UK and Ireland stock the sauce. A follow-up episode of Dragons' Den, aired on 18 July 2007, revealed that Sainsbury's had expected the sauce to sell 50,000 bottles in its first year but instead sold 40,000-50,000 bottles per week.

In the first half of 2008, Roots launched "Love Apple Tomato Sauce" and "Fiery Guava Dipping Sauce" in the same style as Reggae Reggae sauce. A cookbook called Reggae Reggae Cookbook was released in June 2008. The "Love Apple Tomato Sauce" was later renamed "Reggae Reggae Tomato Ketchup".

Restaurants Subway, Hungry Horse and pub chains Slug and Lettuce and Scream offer the sauce on various menu items. In July 2009, Birds Eye released chicken Chargrills in Reggae Reggae Sauce.

In the summer of 2010, snacks were added to the range of products with the launch of Reggae Reggae Peanuts and Cashews. These peanuts are covered in the original Reggae Reggae Sauce and seasonings. Subsequently a range of Reggae Reggae flavoured Caribbean ready meals was launched.

In September 2010, Morrisons supermarket announced it would be carrying a range of Levi Roots sandwiches.

In April 2011, Domino's Pizza in the UK launched a limited edition "Reggae Reggae Pizza", a combination of toppings with the Reggae Reggae sauce. In 2012, KFC launched a Reggae Reggae box meal.

The range has expanded into other areas such as Levi Roots Jamaica Ginger Cake and Levi Roots Caribbean Crush drink which is sold in mainstream UK supermarkets.

In 2012, a new "Mild" variant of the sauce was released.
