= Thames Christian School =

Location
- 12 Grant Road; London, England, SW11 2FR; United Kingdom; 51°28′07″N 0°10′29″W

Information
- Type: Private
- Religious affiliation: Christian
- Established: 2000
- Founder: Dr Stephen Holsgrove
- Local authority: Wandsworth
- Department for Education URN: 132237 Tables
- Ofsted: Reports
- Head: Dr Stephen Holsgrove
- Gender: Mixed
- Age: 11 to 18
- Enrolment: 210
- Houses: Nightingale, Bonhoeffer, Barnardo, and Wilberforce
- Website: http://www.thameschristianschool.org.uk/

Thames Christian School is a co-educational, Independent secondary school based in Battersea, south-west London for pupils aged 11 to 18. Founded in September 2000, the school has a non-denominational Christian ethos and marked its 25th anniversary in 2025.The school is inspected by the Independent Schools Inspectorate, with their last inspection taking place in 2025.

== Location ==
The school is situated within a purpose-built RIBA school building that was opened in 2022.

== Curriculum ==
In 2025, a third of pupils achieved at least five 9-7 grades at GCSE with many achieving at least one grade higher than their baseline predictions. At A Level in 2025, 39% of grades were A*/A and 85% were A*/C.
