= Michael Fuller =

First ethnic minority chief constable of police in the UK

Michael Fuller QPM
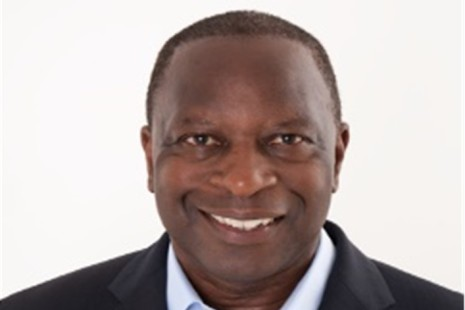
- Michael Fuller, QPM

Chief Constable of Kent Police
- In office January 2004 – April 2010
- Preceded by: Robert Ayling
- Succeeded by: Ian Learmonth

Personal details
- Born: 1959 (age 66–67) London, England
- Occupation: Retired Chief Constable

Michael Fuller QPM (born 1959), also known as Mike Fuller, is a former Chief Constable of Kent Police and Chief Inspector of the Crown Prosecution Service. He was the first (and so far only) ethnic minority chief constable in the United Kingdom and the first black officer of chief constable-equivalent rank.

Fuller joined the Metropolitan Police in 1975 as a cadet aged 16 and served in uniformed and CID positions throughout London. His service has included several postings at New Scotland Yard.

Whilst a detective chief inspector stationed at Shepherd's Bush and Hammersmith, he devised an innovative burglary control programme which successfully reduced burglary. This was a forerunner to the London-wide Operation Bumblebee. As DCI at Paddington he devised innovative covert techniques to successfully reduce street robbery under the Operation Eagle Eye initiative.

As a detective superintendent he worked as a specialist staff officer seconded to Her Majesty's Inspectorate of Constabulary based at the Home Office. He gave specialist advice on crime and terrorism issues and carried out inspections of police force Special Branches in relation to counter-terrorism. He also gave regular advice to the Chief HMI, Ministers and the Home Secretary.

In 1998, he helped set up the Racial and Violent Crime Task Force in response to criticism of the Metropolitan Police arising from the Stephen Lawrence Inquiry. He subsequently served as a uniformed superintendent in Lambeth and was the chief superintendent in charge of Battersea, where he was successful in reducing street crime.

In January 2000, as a commander, he took command of West Area Serious Crime Group. As well as overseeing murder investigations, he set up Operation Trident to tackle gun crime within black communities in London.

In 2001, he won the G2 ‘Man of the Year Award’ in recognition of his personal achievements and contribution to policing in London. In February 2002, he was promoted to deputy assistant commissioner. As well as heading the Metropolitan Police Drugs Directorate, he was also the Director of Intelligence, as part of a newly formed Specialist Crime Directorate.

On 5 January 2004 he took up his role as Chief Constable of Kent. On 16 February 2010, it was announced that following his qualification as a Barrister, Fuller would be leaving Kent Police to start his new role as Her Majesty's Chief Inspector of the Crown Prosecution Service Inspectorate. He was called to Bar at Lincoln's Inn on 26 July 2007.

He retired from the Crown Prosecution Service Inspectorate in 2015 at the end of his 5-year appointment. He has written a book about his experiences in policing entitled Kill the Black One First A Memoir of Hope and Justice, published in February 2019.

In 2019, Fuller was awarded an honorary doctorate by Arden University for his "long-standing commitment to mentoring black officers and community support work".

Police appointments
Preceded by Robert Ayling	Chief Constable of Kent Police; 2004–2010	Succeeded by Ian Learmonth
