= R (World Development Movement Ltd) v Secretary of State for Foreign Affairs =

R (World Development Movement Ltd) v Foreign Secretary
- Court: House of Lords
- Citations: [1995] EWHC Admin 1, [1995] 1 WLR 386

Keywords
- Judicial review

R (World Development Movement Ltd) v Secretary of State for Foreign Affairs [1995] EWHC Admin 1 is a UK constitutional law case, concerning judicial review.

== Facts ==
The World Development Movement claimed the Foreign Secretary's decision to fund the Pergau Dam project in Malaysia was not providing quality aid. It claimed it represented broader public interests, including of people in developing countries. The Foreign Secretary argued it should not have standing by having a sufficient interest. The WDM claimed the Foreign Secretary had misused powers conferred by the legislation.

== Judgment ==
The High Court held that the WDM had a sufficient interest, and that too much money was spent on the dam.

Rose LJ said the following:

factors of significance in the present case: the importance of vindicating the rule of law... the importance of the issue raised... the likely absence of any other responsible challenger... the nature of the breach of duty... the prominent role of these applicants in giving advice, guidance and assistance with regard to aid... the applicants here do have a sufficient interest....

== See also ==
- UK constitutional law
