= Back to Basics (campaign) =

Political campaign

Back to Basics was a political campaign announced by Prime Minister of the United Kingdom John Major at the 1993 Conservative Party Conference in Blackpool, England. Pitched as a nostalgic appeal to "old values" such as "neighbourliness, decency, courtesy", it was widely interpreted in the media as a campaign for socially conservative causes such as support for the nuclear family. The campaign became the subject of ridicule when a succession of Conservative Party politicians were caught up in scandals. The previous year of Major's premiership had been beset by infighting within the Conservative Party on the issue of European integration, including rebellions in several Parliamentary votes on the Maastricht Treaty, and the government was also dealing with the fallout from the Black Wednesday economic crisis of September 1992.

== John Major's speech ==
Major's speech, delivered at the Conservative Party Conference on 8 October 1993, began by noting the divided state of the party:

Disunity leads to opposition. Not just opposition in Westminster, but in the European Parliament and in town halls and county halls up and down this country ... [a]nd if agreement is impossible, and sometimes on great issues it is difficult, if not impossible, then I believe I have the right, as leader of this party, to hear of that disagreement in private and not on television, in interviews, outside the House of Commons.

Major then changed the subject to "a world that sometimes seems to be changing too fast for comfort". He attacked many of the changes in British society since the Second World War, singling out developments in housing, education, and criminal justice. He then continued:

The old values – neighbourliness, decency, courtesy – they're still alive, they're still the best of Britain. They haven't changed, and yet somehow people feel embarrassed by them. Madam President, we shouldn't be. It is time to return to those old core values, time to get back to basics, to self-discipline and respect for the law, to consideration for others, to accepting a responsibility for yourself and your family and not shuffling off on other people and the state.

Major mentioned the "basics" again near the conclusion of his speech:

The message from this conference is clear and simple: we must go back to basics. We want our children to be taught the best, our public services to give the best, our British industry to be the best and the Conservative Party will lead the country back to those basics right across the board. Sound money, free trade, traditional teaching, respect for the family and respect for the law. And above all, we will lead a new campaign to defeat the cancer that is crime.

== Media reaction ==
During 1993, Britain was going through what has been characterised as a moral panic on the issue of single mothers. Government ministers regularly made speeches on the issue, such as Secretary of State for Wales John Redwood's condemnation of "young women [who] have babies with no apparent intention of even trying marriage or a stable relationship with the father of the child" from July 1993, and Secretary of State for Social Security Peter Lilley's characterisation of single mothers as "benefit-driven" and "undeserving" from the same year. The murder of James Bulger in February 1993, committed by two young boys from single-parent families, served to intensify the media frenzy.

Apart from some general appeals to the nuclear family and self-reliance, Major's "Back to Basics" speech said nothing specific about sexual behaviour or single motherhood. On 6 January 1994, Major explicitly stated that the campaign was not "a crusade about personal morality". Despite this, the campaign was widely interpreted by the media as including a "family values" component. According to Debbie Epstein and Richard Johnson:

It is true that there was little in his original speech about sexuality ... What proved critical, however, was the adoption of a moral traditionalist tone, including the usual references to 'the family' and 'responsibility', and the labelling of the Conservative Party as the party of morality. The party was now vulnerable to every personal moral disclosure, around financial and political corruption, but also, given the press's own agenda, around sexuality. For editors and journalists, the high-profile espousal of morality offered additional justification for the papers' risky stories, and a further defence against threats to introduce privacy legislation against press intrusion. It was indubitably 'in the public interest' not to hush up misdemeanours within the Back To Basics party, however private.

Writing in his diary shortly after, in reference to the resignation of Michael Brown as a government whip in 1994 following newspaper revelations that he had taken a trip to Barbados with a 20-year-old man, journalist Piers Morgan, who helped expose many Conservative Party scandals as editor of the News of the World, opined:

Major brought all these exposés on himself, with that ludicrous 'Back to Basics' speech at the last Tory conference ... It strikes me that probably every Tory MP is up to some sexual shenanigans, but we can hardly get them all fired or there will be nobody left to run the country. Still, needs must. Brown's shenanigans will shift a few papers, get followed everywhere and ensure the NoW leads the news agenda again. We're on a roll and it feels fantastic.

== Scandals ==
The following scandals were linked to the "Back to Basics" campaign in the media:

=== 1991 ===
- In April 1991 Chancellor of the Exchequer Norman Lamont was embarrassed when it was revealed that a sex therapist lived in his rented-out London flat, and that he was frequently in credit card debt.

=== 1992 ===
- On 24 September 1992 David Mellor resigned as Secretary of State for National Heritage following intense press attention regarding his extramarital affair with actress Antonia de Sancha. The Sun, relying on material supplied by publicist Max Clifford, made a number of lurid claims about their lovemaking, including that Mellor had sucked de Sancha's toes and had worn a Chelsea football shirt during intercourse, that de Sancha later stated were false. Mellor remained in office for two months after the story broke, but was forced to resign when it was revealed that he had accepted a free holiday from the daughter of the Palestine Liberation Organization's finance director. Although Mellor's resignation antedated Major's "Back to Basics" speech by more than a year, the media were quick to link the new campaign to the scandal. There was some speculation that the press were taking revenge over Mellor's support for the creation of the Press Complaints Commission.
- In 1992 Conservative MP Alan Amos received a police caution for indecency after being found cruising for gay sex on Hampstead Heath, a notorious cruising spot.

=== 1993 ===
- In February 1993 Major himself sued a publication which falsely alleged he had conducted an affair with Downing Street caterer Clare Latimer.
- In May 1993 Michael Mates, a junior minister in the Northern Ireland office, resigned over his links to Asil Nadir, a UK-based Northern Cypriot businessman who later fled the country after an indictment by the Serious Fraud Office.
- Between September and November 1993 newspapers revealed that junior transport minister Steven Norris had separated from his wife and was conducting simultaneous affairs with three different women (who were not all aware of each other's existence). A further two long-term mistresses from his past were also exposed in the media; this prompted the headline "YES, YES, YES, YES, YES, MINISTER!!!" Norris remained in office, with John Major reportedly believing that he "was entitled to act as he likes in his private life". The revelations continued during the party conference at which Major made his "Back to Basics" speech.
- In December 1993 it was revealed that Tim Yeo, Minister for the Environment and Countryside, had fathered an illegitimate child, despite having publicly talked of the need to "reduce broken families and the number of single parents"; he later resigned in January 1994.

=== 1994 ===
- On 8 January 1994 Alan Duncan MP, a millionaire, resigned as a Parliamentary Private Secretary after it was revealed that he had acquired a house in Westminster (which had been designated as a council house) adjoining his own 18th century townhouse, at a reduced price, by exploiting a government programme to increase home ownership for the underprivileged. The house had been occupied for decades by an elderly next-door neighbour, and Duncan gave him the money to purchase the house at a huge discount under the "Right to Buy" scheme on condition that Duncan would take over the house on the neighbour's death.
- On 9 January 1994 Malcolm Sinclair, 20th Earl of Caithness resigned from his post as Minister for Aviation and Shipping one day after his wife committed suicide. According to her father, this had been precipitated by the Earl's involvement in an extramarital affair.
- On 10 January 1994 a married Conservative MP, David Ashby, admitted that he had shared a hotel bed with a "close" male friend on a rugby tour, but denied claims by his wife that he had left her for a man or that was having a homosexual relationship.
- On 16 January 1994 another Conservative MP, Gary Waller, confirmed newspaper reports that he had fathered a child with the secretary of another MP.
- On 7 February 1994 the Conservative MP Stephen Milligan was found dead as a result of apparent autoerotic asphyxiation, wearing only a pair of women's stockings and suspenders, with his head covered and an orange segment in his mouth. According to the diary of his long-time friend, the Conservative MP Gyles Brandreth, Milligan had just been offered promotion to a ministerial job earlier that day, and Brandreth speculated that Milligan had gone home "to celebrate".
- On 13 February 1994 Hartley Booth resigned as a parliamentary private secretary. The married father of three and Methodist lay preacher claimed that his 22-year-old female researcher had "seduced [him] into kissing and cuddling".
- On 8 May 1994 Michael Brown resigned as a junior government whip after the News of the World revealed that he had taken a holiday in Barbados in the company of a 20-year-old man. At that time, the age of consent for same-sex male relationships was still 21 (it was due to be reduced to 18 later in 1994). Brown subsequently acknowledged his sexuality, becoming the second openly gay MP. Brandreth wrote that his wife remarked that this revelation signalled "Back To Basics gone to buggery".
- On 10 July 1994 Parliamentary Private Secretaries David Tredinnick and Graham Riddick resigned after being caught by The Sunday Times taking cash in exchange for asking Parliamentary questions.
- On 20 October 1994 Tim Smith resigned as Northern Ireland minister after being accused by The Guardian of accepting cash for asking Parliamentary questions on behalf of Egyptian businessman Mohamed Al-Fayed. Smith admitted the allegations.
- On 25 October 1994 Neil Hamilton resigned as minister for regulation and corporate affairs over the cash-for-questions affair. Unlike Smith, Hamilton denied taking money and gifts from Al-Fayed and vowed to sue his accusers in court.
- On 10 November 1994 the Pergau Dam case was decided. Britain had provided aid money to Malaysia to build the Pergau Dam allegedly as part of a quid pro quo for favourable business deals. The court found that Foreign Secretary Douglas Hurd had not been legally entitled to supply the funds, as the economic viability of the project had not been proven.

=== 1995 ===
- On 8 February 1995 Under-Secretary of State for Scotland Allan Stewart resigned from the Scottish Office after waving a pickaxe at an anti-motorway protester. Later, in 1997, he also resigned his position of MP after allegations of an affair.
- On 6 March 1995, Robert Hughes resigned as Minister responsible for the Citizen's Charter over an affair with a constituency worker who had come to him for help from an abusive relationship. Hughes confessed to the affair and resigned when he believed that the liaison was about to be exposed in a Sunday newspaper.
- On 9 April 1995 Richard Spring resigned as a Parliamentary Private Secretary after a News of the World sting allegedly caught him in a "three in a bed sex romp" with a male acquaintance and the acquaintance's girlfriend. The fact that Spring was single at the time raised accusations that the paper was conducting an unwarranted intrusion into his private life.
- On 10 April 1995 Jonathan Aitken resigned as Chief Secretary to the Treasury in order to sue The Guardian and the ITV series World in Action after they alleged that Saudi businessmen had paid for his stay at the Paris Ritz hotel, that he had enjoyed inappropriate commercial relations with two British-Lebanese arms dealers while minister for defence procurement, and that he had procured prostitutes for a Saudi prince and his entourage while they stayed at a British health farm. Aitken denied all of the accusations and promised to wield "the simple sword of truth and the trusty shield of British fair play" in libel proceedings against The Guardian and Granada Television. At an early stage in the trial, it became apparent that he had lied under oath, and he was subsequently convicted of perjury and sentenced to a term of imprisonment.

=== 1996 ===
- In 1996 a long-running investigation into the homes for votes scandal found that the Conservative-controlled Westminster City Council had conducted an unofficial policy of removing homeless people from the borough and replacing them with likely Conservative voters.
- On 2 June 1996 Rod Richards resigned as a Welsh Office minister after his extra-marital affair was disclosed in the News of the World. Richards had been a staunch advocate of the "Back To Basics" campaign in his strongly religious Welsh constituency. Upon hearing of the revelations, John Major demanded that Richards resign immediately; this so-called "one bonk and you're out" policy was a notable contrast with his earlier leniency towards Norris, Yeo and David Mellor.
- In late 1996 MP and Paymaster General David Willetts was disciplined by the parliamentary ombudsman over his intervention in a parliamentary enquiry in 1996.

=== 1997 ===
- On 5 January 1997 the News of the World revealed that Conservative MP Jerry Hayes had been engaged in an extra-marital relationship with a young man. The affair began in 1991, when the man was 18 (the age of consent for same-sex male relationships at that time was 21).
- In March 1997 Michael Hirst, Chairman of the Scottish Conservatives, resigned in the wake of revelations that he had had several previous homosexual affairs with other, younger Scottish Tories.
- In 1997 the MP Piers Merchant was revealed to be having an affair with a Soho nightclub hostess, and was forced to resign after it emerged he had conducted another affair with a parliamentary researcher.

== Later revelations ==
The Conservative Party lost the 1997 United Kingdom general election to the Labour Party under Tony Blair, and Major resigned as Conservative Party leader afterwards. Several years later, it was revealed that he had conducted a four-year extramarital affair with fellow Conservative MP Edwina Currie in the 1980s. The liaison occurred when both were backbenchers, and had ended two years before Major became prime minister. Currie disclosed the romance in her diaries, published in 2002, adding that she considered the "Back to Basics" campaign to have been "absolute humbug". In 2017, Major said the slogan was an example of how sound bites can mislead the public: "it was taken up to pervert a thoroughly worthwhile social policy and persuaded people it was about something quite different."

== In popular culture ==
The phrase has since been used by UK political commentators to describe any failed attempt by a political party leader to relaunch themselves following a scandal or controversy. The phrase was satirised in the Viz strip Baxter Basics.
