= Max Clifford =

English publicist and sex offender (1943–2017)

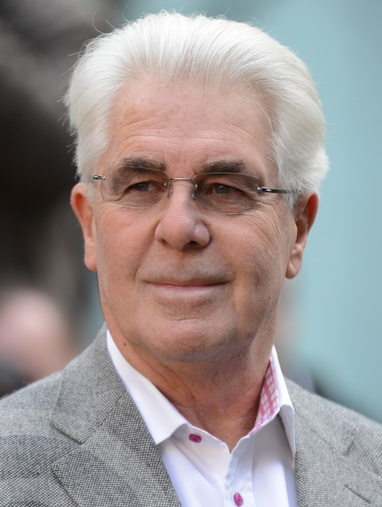
- Clifford in March 2014
- Born: Maxwell Frank Clifford; 6 April 1943; Kingston upon Thames, England
- Died: 10 December 2017 (aged 74); Hinchingbrooke Hospital, Huntingdon, England
- Occupation: Publicist
- Years active: 1970–2012
- Spouses: Elizabeth Porter (m. 1967; died 2003) Jo Westwood (m. 2010; div. 2014)
- Children: 1

Maxwell Frank Clifford (6 April 1943 – 10 December 2017) was an English publicist and convicted sex offender who was particularly associated with promoting "kiss and tell" stories in tabloid newspapers.

On 6 December 2012, as part of Operation Yewtree, Clifford was arrested on suspicion of sexual offences. He was sentenced to eight years in prison in May 2014 after being found guilty of eight counts of indecent assault on four girls and women aged between 15 and 19. He died in December 2017 after suffering a heart attack in HM Prison Littlehey.

== Early life ==
Maxwell Frank Clifford was born in Kingston upon Thames on 6 April 1943, the son of Lilian (née Boffee) and electrician Frank Clifford. He was the youngest of four children, with one sister and two brothers. The family survived their father's regular bouts of unemployment, gambling, and alcoholism with the help and support of their grandmother and Clifford's sister, who was employed as a PA to the London Vice-President of Morgan Guarantee Trust Bank. Clifford left school at 15 with no qualifications, and he was dismissed within four months of his first job at Ely's department store in Wimbledon. His brother Bernard used his print union connections to secure Clifford a job as editorial assistant on the Eagle. When the publication moved premises, Clifford decided to take redundancy, buying his first house and finding work with the South London Press to train as a journalist.

== Career ==
=== Early work as a publicist ===
After working in newspapers for a few years, writing an occasional record/music column and running a disco, Clifford replied to an advertisement and joined as the second member of the EMI press office in 1962, under Chief Press Officer Syd Gillingham. As the youngest and the only trained journalist in a team of four, Clifford claimed he was given the job of promoting the then relatively unknown Beatles, including during their first tour of the United States.

After Gillingham left EMI, he asked Clifford to join him at Chris Hutchins's PR agency. Among the artists they represented were Paul and Barry Ryan, who introduced Clifford to their stepfather, impresario Harold Davidson, who handled the UK affairs of Frank Sinatra and Judy Garland.

In 1970, aged 27, and after Gillingham retired, Clifford left Hutchins and started his own agency, Max Clifford Associates. Based in the offices of Joe Cocker's manager, he started off by representing Sinatra, Cocker, Paul and Barry Ryan, Don Partridge, and Marvin Gaye. He later also represented Muhammad Ali and Marlon Brando.

=== Pamella Bordes ===
Clifford was approached by a brothel madam, who had provided one of Clifford's clients with various services, worried about publicity from an investigative reporter from the News of the World. Clifford asked the madam to reveal details of her girls and clients, and found that one prostitute, Pamella Bordes, was simultaneously dating Andrew Neil (then editor of The Sunday Times), Donald Trelford (then editor of The Observer), Conservative minister for sport Colin Moynihan, and billionaire arms dealer Adnan Khashoggi. Clifford rang News of the World editor Patsy Chapman and drip-fed her the story of Bordes through the investigative reporter she was using on the madam. The story was published in March 1989 under the headline "Call Girl Works in Commons", since it was discovered she had a House of Commons security pass arranged by MPs David Shaw and Henry Bellingham. Clifford acknowledged the significance of the Bordes story in shaping his career: "It opened the world of kiss-and-tell... Even though she was never my client, my name was associated with the story..."

=== Clients ===
"Freddie Starr Ate My Hamster", headline of The Sun, 13 March 1986

Clifford came to public attention after creating the infamous "Freddie Starr ate my hamster" headline in 1986 for The Sun in an effort to draw attention to his client, Freddie Starr. In May 2006 the BBC nominated "Freddie Starr ate my hamster" as one of the most familiar British newspaper headlines over the last century. Clifford later represented various clients, including former Liverpool left-wing politician Derek Hatton, for whom Clifford created an affair to change his image; O. J. Simpson, for which reason Clifford claimed to have received death threats; Gillian McKeith, whose adverts he believed harmed her image; Rebecca Loos, when she negotiated with the press about her alleged affair with England football captain David Beckham; and Jade Goody, during the reality star's cervical cancer and death. Clifford represented Simon Cowell for over a decade and was credited with shaping his public image; Cowell dropped Clifford following Clifford's 2014 conviction. In 2016, a judge awarded former client Paul Burrell £5,000 damages after Burrell sued Clifford, saying that Clifford forwarded private material in a fax to Rebekah Brooks at News of the World in 2002.

Journalist Louis Theroux followed Clifford in the BBC Two series When Louis Met... in a 2002 episode titled When Louis Met ... Max Clifford. During filming, it appeared that Clifford was trying to set up Theroux during a PR stunt in Sainsbury's. It backfired after Clifford was heard lying on his microphone, unaware it was still on.

Clifford represented a witness in the case against Gary Glitter. In 2005, Clifford paid damages to settle defamation proceedings brought by Neil and Christine Hamilton after he represented Nadine Milroy-Sloane, who was later found to have falsely accused the pair of sexual assault. Also in 2005, he told reporters that he would not represent Michael Jackson after he was found not guilty of child abuse charges, saying: "It would be the hardest job in PR after [representing] Saddam Hussein". Following the Jimmy Savile sexual abuse scandal, but prior to his arrest, Clifford claimed that dozens of "big name stars" contacted him and feared they would become implicated in the scandal; he claimed that in the 1960s and 70s they "never asked for anybody's birth certificate" before having sex.

==== LGBT clients ====
Clifford helped clients who wished to conceal their sexual orientation from the public. He claimed that he was approached twice by major football clubs to help make players present a "straight" image. In an interview with Pink News, reported on 5 August 2009, Clifford said that if a gay or bisexual football player came out, his career would be over:

To my knowledge there is only one top-flight professional gay footballer who came out – Justin Fashanu. He ended up committing suicide. I have been advising a top premiership star who is bisexual. If it came out that he had gay tendencies, his career would be over in two minutes. Should it be? No, but if you go on the terraces and hear the way fans are, and also, that kind of general attitude that goes with football, it's almost like going back to the dark ages.

Clifford said none of his clients had been outed.

In December 2009, he told The Independent on Sunday that he had represented two high-profile Premier League footballers in the past five years whom he advised to stay in the closet because football "remains in the dark ages, steeped in homophobia".

=== Politics ===
Clifford stated that what motivated him was much more than just money; he said he could not stand hypocrisy in public life, reserved a particular disgust for lying politicians, and watched with growing anger what he thought happened to the National Health Service over the past 20 years. For this reason, and because of his working-class background, Clifford was a traditional Labour supporter who worked to bring down the government of John Major because he felt that the NHS was being mismanaged.

==== The Major government ====
In light of Clifford's view of the deteriorating state of the NHS – having obtained treatment for his daughter, who had been diagnosed with juvenile idiopathic arthritis – and moral differences with members of the John Major government, Clifford worked to expose stories to help the Labour Party to power. Although not instrumental in exposing David Mellor's affair with Antonia de Sancha, Clifford's battle in representing de Sancha against the contrived post-spin story of the "family man Mellor" handled by counter PR Timothy Bell ultimately derailed Major's 'Back to Basics' agenda. Clifford invented the story which claimed Mellor had sex in a Chelsea F.C. football kit, though he was blocked from mentioning it in his memoirs. Clifford also helped to expose Jeffrey Archer's perjury in the 1980s during his candidacy for the post of Mayor of London.

On 18 February 1995, he was interviewed at length by Andrew Neil for his one-on-one interview show Is This Your Life? on Channel 4.

==== The Blair government ====
Although a supporter of the Labour Party, Clifford's approach in dealing with the Blair government was similar to that which he employed with Major's preceding Conservative government. The first instance of this was the story of the Secretary of State for Wales, Ron Davies. Clifford was subsequently accused by David Blunkett, at the beginning of November 2005, of having a role in Blunkett's second resignation. This derived from claims made on behalf of a much younger woman, who had become involved with Blunkett, over Blunkett's business interests, which were published in The Times.

On 26 April 2006, Clifford represented John Prescott's diary secretary Tracey Temple, in selling her story for "an awful lot more" than £100,000 to The Mail on Sunday. The story was about the affair between Prescott and Temple which took place between 2002 and 2004.

Although he usually backed Labour, Clifford supported, and did some publicity work for, UKIP during the 2004 European election campaign. Clifford said at the time that "The UK Independence Party and myself are in complete agreement that the British people should be the masters of their own destiny through our parliament at Westminster, not subservient to Brussels."

=== Charity works ===
According to his memoirs he handled the publicity for the Daniels family and helped set up the Rhys Daniels Trust from resultant media fees to combat Batten disease. Clifford was also a patron of the Royal Marsden; however, after his conviction, staff at the hospital stated he was no longer a patron. Also, following his 2014 conviction of indecent assault, Shooting Star CHASE and Woking and Sam Beare Hospices announced that Clifford was no longer a patron for either charity.

== Indecent assault convictions ==
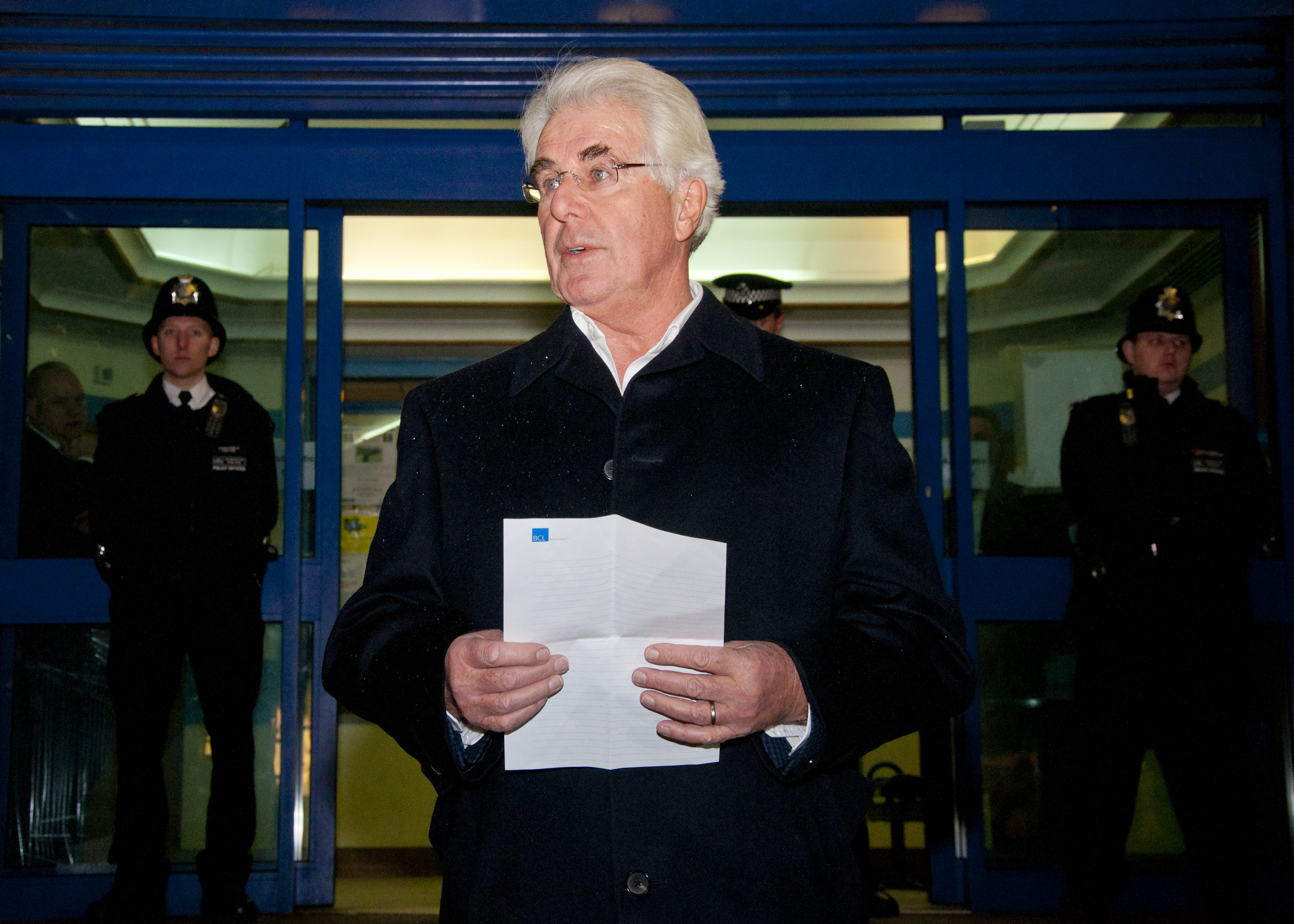
Clifford reading a statement following his arrest

Clifford was arrested at his home on 6 December 2012 by Metropolitan Police officers on suspicion of sexual offences; the arrest was part of Operation Yewtree which was set up in the wake of the Jimmy Savile sexual abuse scandal. He was taken to a central London police station for questioning. The two alleged offences dated from 1977.

On 26 April 2013, Clifford was charged with a further eleven indecent assaults between 1966 and 1985 on girls and women aged 14 to 19. Clifford claimed the allegations were "completely false".

On 28 May 2013, Clifford pleaded not guilty at Westminster Magistrates' Court; a hearing took place at Southwark Crown Court on 12 June 2013 when a date for his trial was set for 4 March 2014.

On 28 April 2014, Clifford was convicted of eight counts of indecent assault against four victims by a jury at Southwark Crown Court. He was acquitted of two charges of indecent assault, and the jury failed to reach a verdict on another charge. Following the verdict the National Society for the Prevention of Cruelty to Children's Director of National Services Peter Watt stated "Max Clifford has rightly been unmasked as a ruthless and manipulative sex offender who preyed for decades on children and young women". On 2 May 2014, Judge Anthony Leonard sentenced Clifford to a total of eight years in prison. Judge Leonard told Clifford he should serve at least half his sentence in prison, adding that he was sure Clifford had also assaulted a 12-year-old girl in Spain, although this charge could not be pursued in the British courts.

The judge added that if the offences had taken place after the law was changed in 2003, several of the offences of which Clifford was found guilty would have been tried as rape, which carries a maximum penalty of life imprisonment. One of Clifford's victims explained to the court that Clifford's assault on her (at age 15) had prevented her from having her first sexual relationship with a partner her own age, while another said that in the years following the assault she had cried whenever she saw Clifford on television, and had feared that the police would laugh at her. Clifford dismissed his victims as "fantasists" and "opportunists". The judge concluded that Clifford had caused an "additional element of trauma" to his victims by his "contemptuous attitude" during the trial.

On 7 November 2014, Clifford's appeal against his eight-year sentence for sex offences was rejected by the Court of Appeal. The court ruled the sentence handed to Clifford earlier that year was "justified and correct." The court compared Clifford's case with that of broadcaster Stuart Hall in 2013; Clifford had claimed innocence, but did not directly dispute the claims of his victims. In contrast Hall had publicly denounced his victims and accused one of seeking "instant notoriety". A lawyer commented on the Clifford appeal court ruling "Nothing Clifford did resembled the disastrous approach taken by Stuart Hall who, prior to pleading guilty to abusing them as girls, denounced his accusers as gold-diggers and liars." Clifford's actions were deemed merely to show no remorse, and not to justify an increased penalty on appeal, although ruling out a reduction in sentence due to mitigating factors; in contrast Hall's sentence was actually increased on appeal.

It was reported on 12 March 2015 that Clifford had been arrested again by Operation Yewtree police. On 3 July 2015, Clifford was charged with a single count of indecent assault stemming from an alleged incident from 1981. He pleaded not guilty on 20 October, and was cleared by a jury of the charge on 7 July 2016.

Before his death, Clifford had won the right to challenge his conviction at the Court of Appeal and his daughter, Louise, continued to challenge his 2014 conviction afterwards posthumously. On 2 April 2019, Clifford's conviction was ultimately upheld by the Court of Appeal, which comprehensively rejected his appeal on all grounds. Lady Justice Rafferty said: "Nothing we heard came anywhere near imperilling the safety of this conviction".

== Personal life ==
Clifford married Elizabeth Louise Porter at St Barnabas Church in Southfields, London, on 3 June 1967. Porter died of lung cancer in Sutton, on 8 April 2003. the couple had one daughter, Louise (1971–2023).

In the late 1970s and early 1980s, Clifford ran and took part in weekly adult parties for his friends and clients around London. The parties brought him into contact with various madams, who he claimed were "happy to help me protect stars from being exposed in the press." Clifford did not regret his role in organising these events, stating "[a]lthough what I've done is certainly immoral, sexual procuring has never bothered me as long as the people involved are old enough to know what they're doing." Several of the young female attendees were motivated by a wish to procure an Equity card and Clifford knew "one or two agents who would issue false contracts in return for sexual favours."

Part of the evidence for his trial of various indecent assaults revolved around the size of his penis, with victims describing it as both a micropenis, and enormous. A doctor measured Clifford's penis at five and a quarter inches long when flaccid, and this fact was used in an attempt to discredit the victims' evidence as unreliable.

In March 2010, the News of the World settled out of court after Clifford sought legal action against it for intercepting his voicemail. After a lunch with editor Rebekah Brooks, the paper agreed to pay Clifford's legal fees and an undisclosed "personal payment" not described as damages. The sum exceeded £1 million. The money was paid in exchange for him exclusively giving the paper stories over the next several years.

Clifford lived in Hersham, Surrey, before his incarceration. On 4 April 2010, he married his former PA, Jo Westwood; wedding guests included Des O'Connor, Bobby Davro, and Theo Paphitis. In May 2014, Westwood was granted a decree nisi, subsequently ending her four-year marriage to Clifford.

On 18 August 2014, Clifford was allowed out of HM Prison Littlehey, handcuffed to a prison officer, to attend his brother Bernard's funeral at the North East Surrey Crematorium in South West London.

Clifford is played by Robert Bathurst in the 2025 ITV drama about the News International phone hacking scandal, The Hack.

== Death ==
On 7 December 2017, Clifford collapsed in HM Prison Littlehey after trying to clean his cell. He was taken to Hinchingbrooke Hospital, near Huntingdon, where he died of a heart attack three days later, on 10 December, at the age of 74.

The inquest into Clifford's death heard medical evidence of his poor health leading up to his death. On 18 December 2019, the coroner ruled that he had died of natural causes.
