= Wimbledon Park =

Urban park in London, England

Coordinates: 51.438734°N 0.205200°W

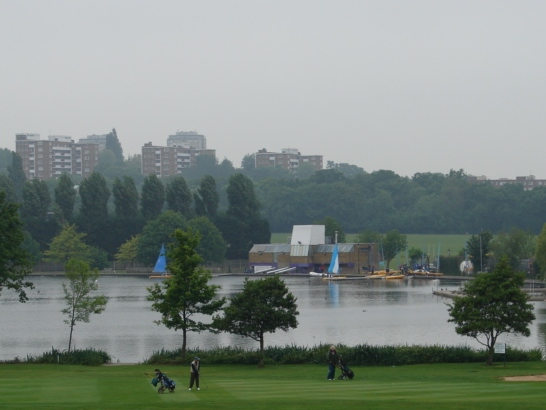
- Wimbledon Park Lake

- Location within Greater London
- Population: 11,197 (2011 Census. Ward)
- London borough: Wandsworth; Merton
- Ceremonial county: Greater London
- Region: London
- Country: England
- Sovereign state: United Kingdom
- Post town: LONDON
- Postcode district: SW18, SW19
- Dialling code: 020
- Police: Metropolitan
- Fire: London
- Ambulance: London
- UK Parliament: Putney and Wimbledon
- London Assembly: Merton and Wandsworth

Wimbledon Park is the name of an urban park in Wimbledon and also of the suburb south and east of the park and the Wimbledon Park tube station. The park itself is 27 hectares (67 acres) in area. The All England Lawn Tennis and Croquet Club is immediately to the west of the park. Wimbledon Park is not part of Wimbledon Common, which is situated further to the west up the hill.

== Early history ==
The original park comprised part of the grounds of Wimbledon manor house, the seat of the manor of Wimbledon, situated on the hill to the south, near St Mary's Church, Wimbledon the old parish church of Wimbledon. A series of owners enlarged the park northwards and eastwards. By the 19th century it was at its largest extent, and one of the homes of the Earls Spencer, lords of the manor. The park had been landscaped in the 18th century by Capability Brown when the lake was formed by constructing a dam across a brook that flows from the springline near Wimbledon Common down to the River Wandle in Earlsfield.

In 1846, the 4th Earl Spencer sold the estate and house to John Augustus Beaumont a property developer who laid out new roads and sold plots of land for house building. Two roads still bear his name today – Augustus Road and Beaumont Road. Development of the area was slow at first, but continued throughout the second half of the 19th century, gradually nibbling away at the parkland.

== 20th century onwards ==
The modern park was purchased by the Borough of Wimbledon just before the First World War and is, with its ornamental lake, the grounds of the Wimbledon Club and Wimbledon Golf Course, the only remnant of the former, larger park. Late in the 20th century the London Borough of Merton sold on the Golf Course to the All England Lawn Tennis and Croquet Club, leaving just the public park and the lake in its ownership, although the northern quarter of the park lies within the London Borough of Wandsworth with the borough boundary bisecting the athletics track.

Along the park's northern edge lies Horse Close wood, a small patch of old planted woodland, largely consisting of Ash and Oak. It is at least 350 years old, predating the park's landscaping by Capability Brown.

A Balcony is situated near the entrance at Home Park Road that once served as a tea room before the Second World War. After its closure and abandonment, its windows got vandalised and was boarded up, as showcased in Raymond Briggs's story of his parents who once lived in the area, Ethel and Ernest. The Balcony has since become a Police Station.

Wimbledon Park was added to the English Heritage (now Historic England) register of historic parks and gardens in 1987.

A new children's water play area was opened in 2007, named the Elisabeth Pool in memory of a local child.

The London Underground District line runs to the east of the Park between Southfields tube station and Wimbledon Park station.

Wimbledon Park is home to a wide range of leisure facilities including tennis courts, a bowls pavilion, beach volleyball court and an outdoor and Watersports centre which offer a huge range of activities such as Sailing, Kayaking and Canoeing on the large lake which is park of the park.

The park also contains an athletics stadium with 400m track.

Every November a large fireworks display takes place in Wimbledon Park, organised by Merton Council.

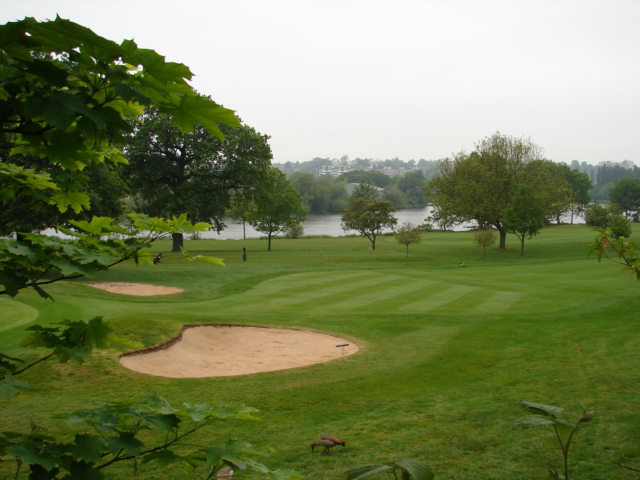
Golf course

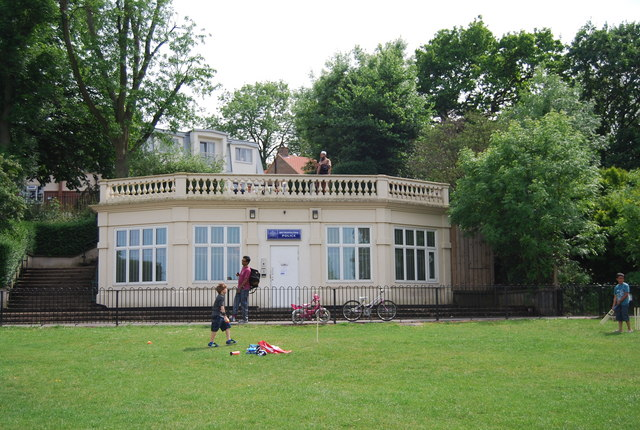
Metropolitan Police Point

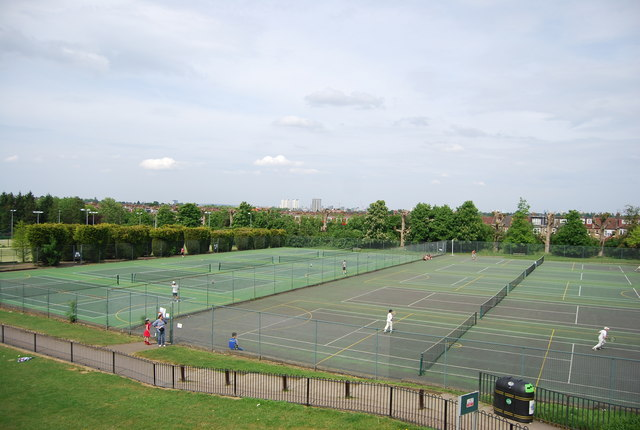
Tennis courts

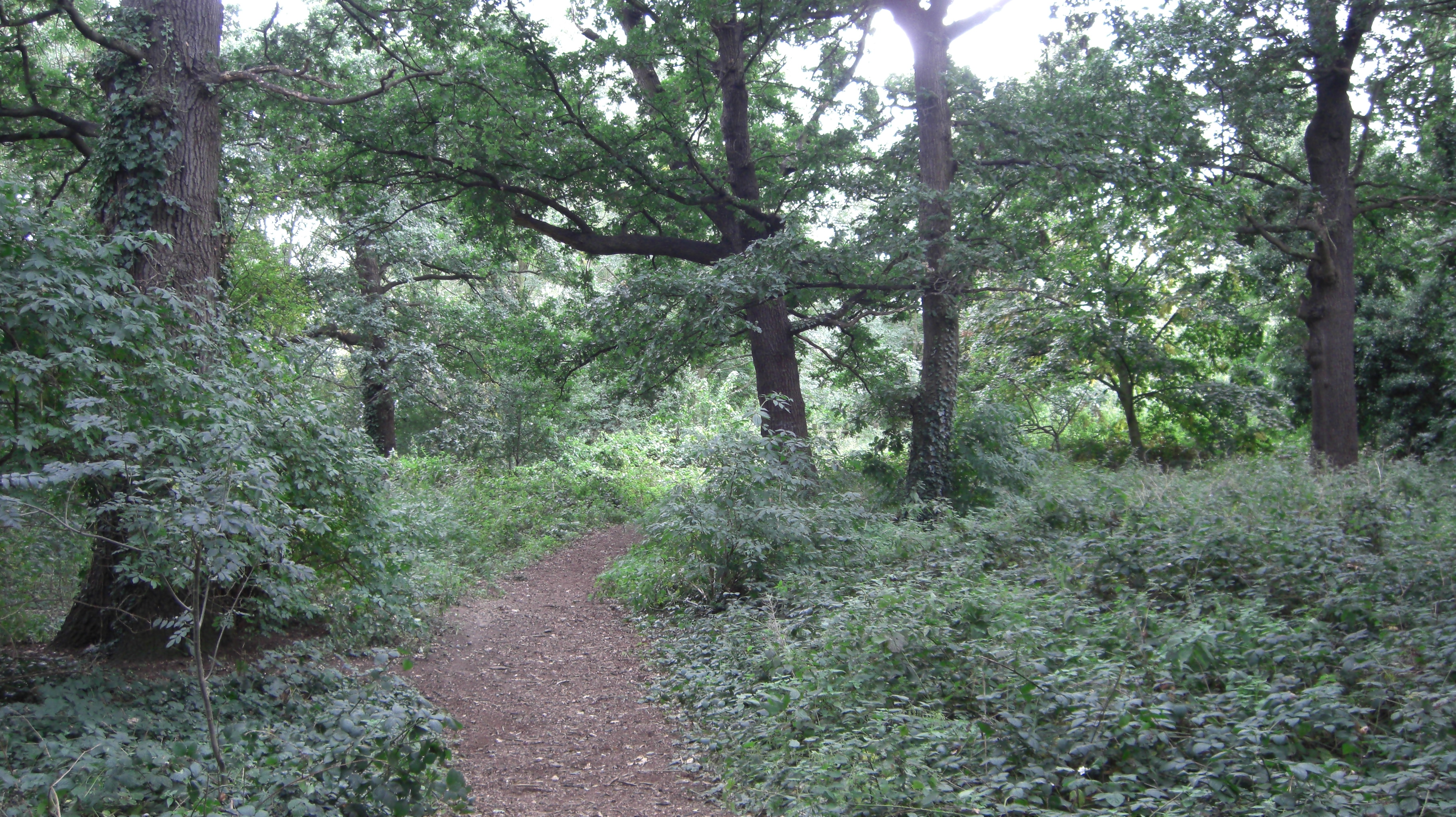
Horse Close Wood

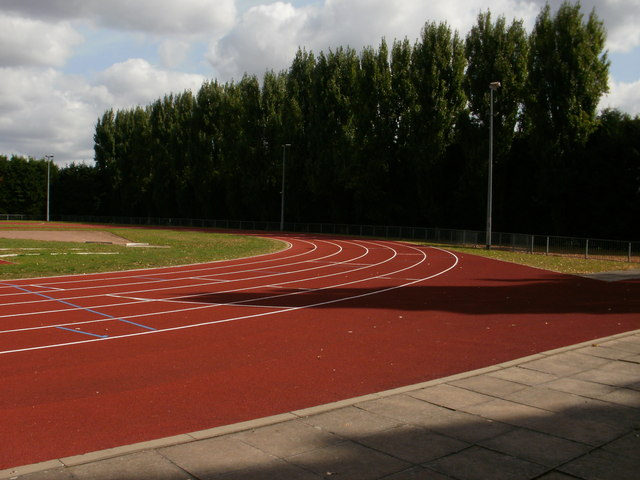
Athletics track

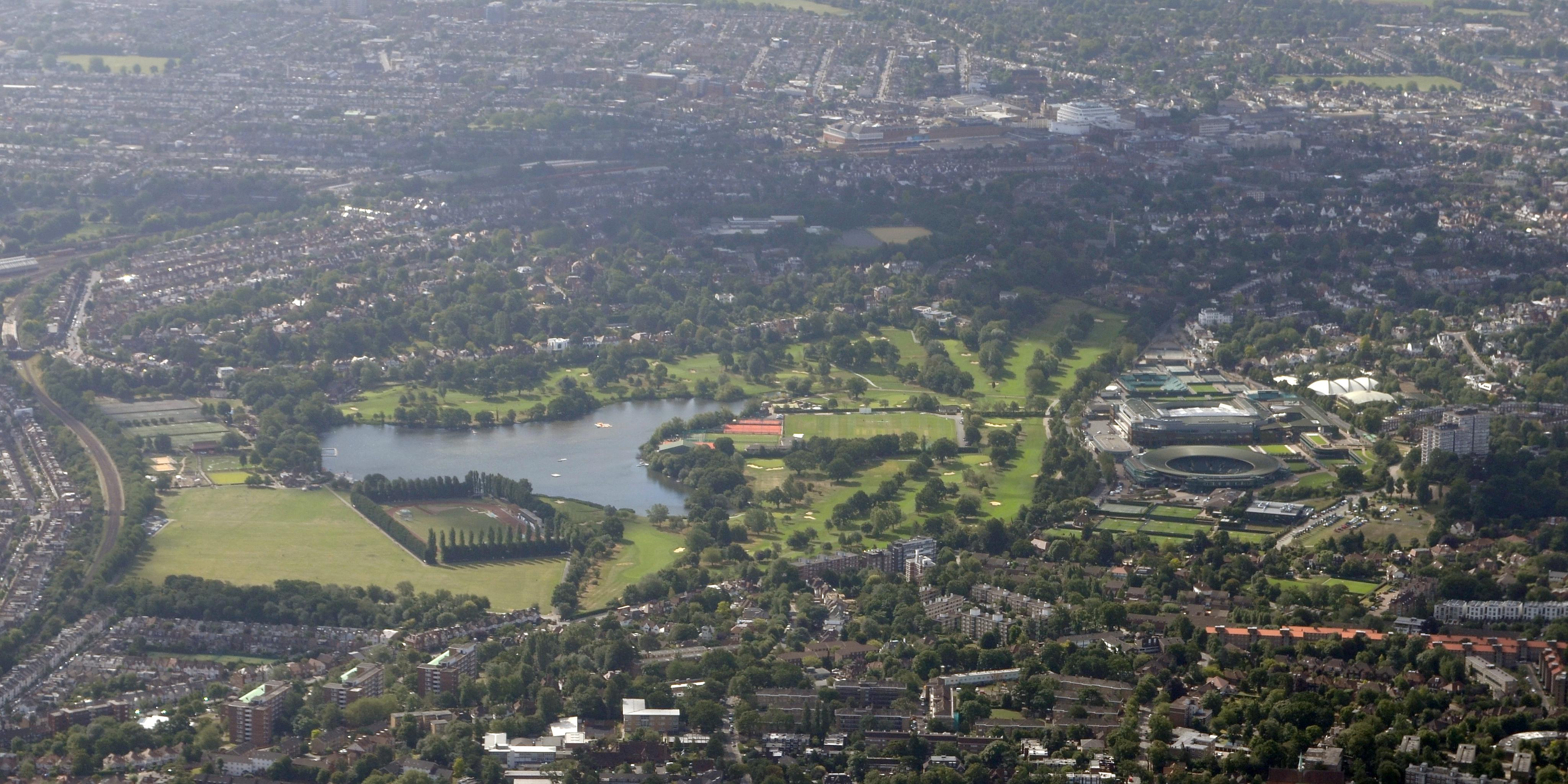
Aerial view with Wimbledon Park (left) and the All-England Club (right)

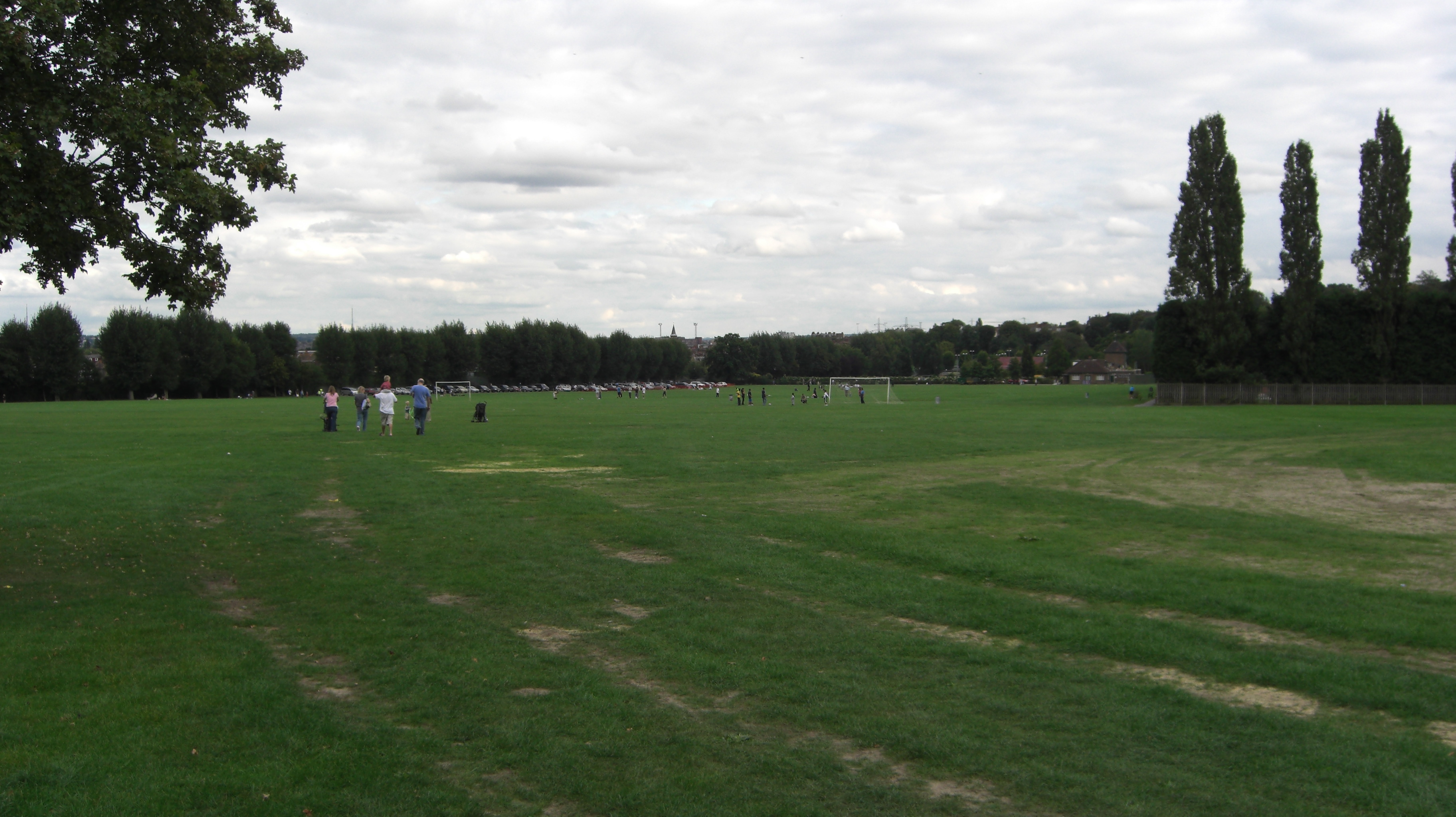
The Park looking south-east from the Wimbledon Park Road entrance

== See also ==
Wimbledon Manor House – For early history of Wimbledon Park and the manor
