= R v Secretary of State for Foreign and Commonwealth Affairs, ex parte World Development Movement Ltd =

- Court: Divisional Court
- Full case name: Regina v Secretary of State for Foreign and Commonwealth Affairs, ex parte World Development Movement Ltd
- Decided: 10 November 1994
- Citations: [1994] EWHC 1 (Admin), [1995] WLR 386, [1995] 1 All ER 611, [1995] COD 211

Court membership
- Judges sitting: Rose LJ, Scott Baker J

R v Secretary of State for Foreign and Commonwealth Affairs, ex parte World Development Movement Ltd is a judicial review case in English law decided by the Divisional Court of England and Wales on 10 November 1994 in which the World Development Movement challenged the decision of the United Kingdom's Secretary of State for Foreign and Commonwealth Affairs to spend £234 million on a development project on Malaysia's Pergau Dam.

== Facts ==
At the time, the Overseas Development Administration (ODA) was under the supervision of the Foreign Secretary and the Foreign and Commonwealth Office, its primary remit being to promote UK exports to the developing world ("aid through trade"). During this period, it has been alleged that there was a connection between the granting of aid and the achievement of either foreign policy goals or British companies winning export orders.

A scandal erupted concerning the UK funding of a hydroelectric dam on the Pergau River in Malaysia, near the Thai border. Building work began in 1991 with money from the UK foreign aid budget. Concurrently, the Malaysian government bought around £1 billion worth of arms from the UK. The suggested linkage of arms deals to aid became the subject of a UK government inquiry from March 1994. In November 1994, the World Development Movement applied for judicial review.

== Judgment ==
The High Court of England and Wales held that the Foreign Secretary, Douglas Hurd, had acted ultra vires (outside of his power, and therefore unlawfully) by allocating £234 million towards the funding of the dam, on the grounds that legislation only empowered him to allocate funds to economically sound projects.

== See also ==
- Department for International Development § History
