= Tom Maynard =

Welsh cricketer

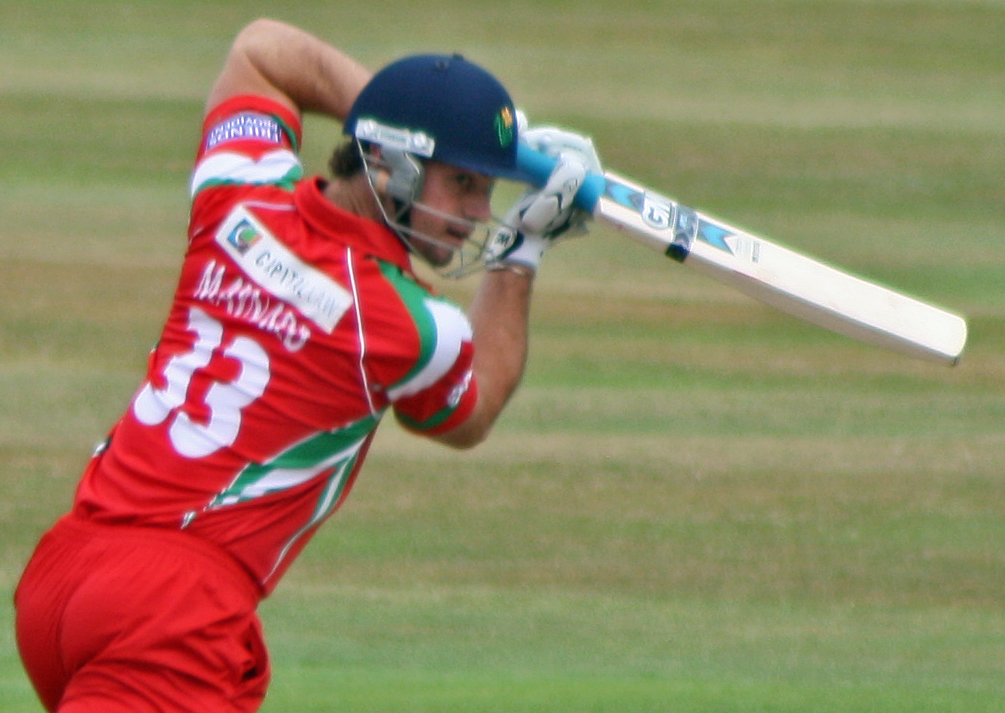

Personal information
- Full name: Thomas Lloyd Maynard
- Born: 25 March 1989; Cardiff, Wales
- Died: 18 June 2012 (aged 23); Wimbledon, London, England
- Height: 6 ft 3 in (1.91 m)
- Batting: Right-handed
- Bowling: Right-arm off break
- Role: Batsman
- Relatives: Matthew Maynard (father)

Domestic team information
- Years: Team
- 2007–2010: Glamorgan (squad no. 33)
- 2011–2012: Surrey (squad no. 55)
- FC debut: 14 August 2007 Glamorgan v Somerset
- Last FC: 6 June 2012 Surrey v Sussex
- LA debut: 10 June 2007 Glamorgan v Gloucestershire
- Last LA: 5 June 2012 Surrey v Scotland

Career statistics
Competition	FC	LA	T20
Matches	48	63	50
Runs scored	2,384	1,763	1,034
Batting average	32.65	32.05	27.21
100s/50s	4/11	2/13	0/6
Top score	143	108	78*
Balls bowled	42	12	–
Wickets	0	0	–
Bowling average	–	–	–
5 wickets in innings	–	–	–
10 wickets in match	–	–	–
Best bowling	–	–	–
Catches/stumpings	48/–	28/–	18/–
- Source: ESPNcricinfo, 18 June 2012

Thomas Lloyd Maynard (25 March 1989 – 18 June 2012) was a Welsh professional cricketer who played for Glamorgan and Surrey, and was selected for the England Lions tour to Bangladesh. On the night of his death, he was stopped by police in Wimbledon for erratic driving, and fled across rail tracks at Wimbledon Park tube station, where he was electrocuted and then hit by a train. The son of former England batsman Matthew Maynard, he was regarded as a highly promising young player.

== Life and career ==
Born in Cardiff, Maynard attended Pentyrch Primary School, Radyr Comprehensive School, and then moved to Millfield School before attending Whitchurch High School for sixth form. Maynard made his way up the ranks with Glamorgan, starting in the county's Under-17s side at the age of 15. By the time he was 16, he had reached the Glamorgan 2nd XI and was playing for the Wales Minor Counties team.

Maynard made his debut for the Glamorgan First XI on 10 June 2007, playing in a Friends Provident Trophy match against the Gloucestershire Gladiators at Colwyn Bay. He hit 71 runs off 75 balls, including seven fours and three sixes before being caught and bowled by Mark Hardinges. After batting second, Glamorgan lost by six runs. Maynard's Twenty20 Cup debut soon followed, as he played in Glamorgan's three-run defeat to the Warwickshire Bears on 24 June 2007; he scored 11 runs before being caught by Tim Ambrose off the bowling of Heath Streak. His first-class debut finally came two months later on the third day of a County Championship match against Somerset. No play was possible on the first two days of the match, so Maynard's debut ended up being restricted to just one innings, in which he scored 15 runs before being caught by Craig Kieswetter off Steffan Jones. He also bowled two overs in the Somerset innings, conceding 18 runs.

After his debut, Maynard's seasonal first-class batting average increased from 11.66 to 22.60, with an overall average of 15.33 and a top score of 51 not out. His Twenty20 average has also increased from 8.66 to 14.57, with an overall average of 12.45, but his List A average remained fairly constant at around 35, except for a drop to around 21.5 in 2008. In both 2009 and 2010 he scored one List A century.

Maynard signed a three-year deal to play for Surrey before the start of the 2011 season. That season saw a big improvement in his batting; in 16 first-class matches, he scored 1,022 runs at an average of 40.88, and he made his first three centuries, with a highest score of 141. In 14 List A matches (of which one was played in Scotland) he scored 515 runs at an average of 39.62. In one of these matches, on 4 September, he hit a 50 off just 28 deliveries. In 15 Friends Life t20 matches he scored 392 runs at an average of 43.55.

He was selected for the England Lions 2011–12 tour to Bangladesh, playing in three List A games with little success, and five Twenty20 games in one of which he scored 68.

In 2012, he continued to perform well for Surrey. He scored 635 runs in eight first-class matches, averaging 45.35, and achieved his career best score of 143. In five List A matches he averaged 39.33. The day before his death, Maynard hit 7 runs off 17 balls against Kent Spitfires in the Friends Life T20 at Beckenham, his only appearance in the competition in the 2012 season.

== Death ==
Maynard's car, a Mercedes-Benz C250, was stopped by police in Arthur Road, Wimbledon, in south west London at around 4 am BST on 18 June 2012, when they observed it being driven erratically. Maynard subsequently fled the scene on foot and the police were unable to locate him. Approximately one hour later, Maynard was severely electrocuted on a railway line near Wimbledon Park Station. He was then hit by a London Underground District line train and his body was found near to the tracks at 5:10 am. According to British Transport Police, his death was treated by authorities as "non-suspicious".

His funeral was held at Llandaff Cathedral on 4 July, with more than 1,000 people in attendance, including England players past and present. Hugh Morris, the England team's managing director, said in his tribute that Maynard was "one of our most exciting and explosive young batsmen. A player who could make the game look deceptively easy, a player who was surely destined for the highest honours of the game, and a player whose authority and elegance at the crease reminded so many of his father." Mark Wallace, the current Glamorgan captain, said that he had "an insatiable appetite for life" and that he could be "a larrikin and a maverick at times". He also said that he would always remember him as "the lad who made us laugh more than anyone else I’ve met".

An official inquest into Maynard's death was held at Westminster Coroner's Court on 26 February 2013. The jury returned a verdict of accidental death. Those who gave evidence included his Surrey teammates Jade Dernbach and Rory Hamilton-Brown, who had been with him earlier in the evening of his death. The post-mortem revealed that Maynard was nearly four times over the legal drink-drive limit and had also taken cocaine and ecstasy in the form of MDMA. A forensic pathologist said that it was not possible to say whether electrocution or being hit by the train was the ultimate cause of death.

== Legacy ==
A charity, the Tom Maynard Trust, was launched in his memory at the CB40 fixture between Surrey and Glamorgan at The Oval on 21 August 2012, to help young cricketers and other young sportspeople in developing their careers. The match also served as a memorial to Maynard, with all the players on both sides wearing shirts that carried Maynard's squad numbers when at Glamorgan and Surrey, 33 and 55 respectively. Both squad numbers were retired, as was the number 64 he wore on duty for the England Lions. Before the match, a posthumous Surrey county cap was presented to Matthew Maynard on behalf of his son.
