= Antonia de Sancha =

English actress and businesswoman (born 1961)

Antonia de Sancha (born 14 September 1961) is an English actress and businesswoman best known as the former mistress of British Conservative Member of Parliament and Cabinet minister David Mellor which became public knowledge in 1992.

Born in Hammersmith, London, she is the daughter of a Spanish film producer father, who died in the mid-1980s, and a Swedish mother who, suffering from severe clinical depression, died by suicide 18 months later, shortly before her daughter began studies at the Royal Academy of Dramatic Art. At the time of revelation of her affair, de Sancha was described by some news outlets as a "soft-porn actress" because she had played the part of a prostitute in a film in which she had simulated sex. The affair with Mellor was a contributory factor in his subsequent resignation from the cabinet on 24 September 1992.

Believing her acting career was ruined and aware that newspapers were making money out of the story while she was not, de Sancha hired publicist Max Clifford to sell her story to various newspapers. She made about £30,000 from those sales. The furore that followed publication left her deeply unhappy. De Sancha told an interviewer 10 years after the scandal, "It was emotional rape", referring to the bugging of her flat which led to the affair's being made public. She had scarcely any work as an actress since the scandal, and considered the scandal as the reason a subsequent marriage failed.

She was the subject of an instalment of the Discovery Channel documentary series The Mistress in 2002. De Sancha subsequently ran an Indian textiles importing business in Portobello Road, Kensington, West London.

== See also ==
- Back to Basics (campaign)
