= Judicial review in English law =

Legal process to challenge public body

Judicial review is a part of UK constitutional law that enables people to challenge the exercise of power, usually by a public body. A person who contends that an exercise of power is unlawful may apply to the Administrative Court (a part of the King's Bench Division of the High Court) for a decision. If the court finds the decision unlawful it may have it set aside (quashed) and possibly (but rarely) award damages. A court may impose an injunction upon the public body.

When creating a public body, legislation will often define duties, limits of power, and prescribe the reasoning a body must use to make decisions. These provisions provide the main parameters for the lawfulness of its decision-making. The Human Rights Act 1998 provides that statutes must be interpreted so far as possible, and public bodies must act, in a manner which is compliant with the European Convention on Human Rights and Fundamental Freedoms. There are common law constraints on the decision-making process of a body.

Unlike in some other jurisdictions, such as the United States, English law does not permit judicial review of primary legislation (in particular, Acts of Parliament), even where primary legislation is contrary to EU law or the European Convention on Human Rights. A person wronged by an Act of Parliament therefore cannot apply for judicial review if this is the case, but may still argue that a body did not follow the Act.

== Constitutional position ==
The English constitutional theory, as expounded by A. V. Dicey, does not recognise a separate system of administrative courts that would review the decisions of public bodies, as in France, Germany and many other European countries. Instead, it is considered that the government should be subject to the jurisdiction of ordinary common law courts.

At the same time, the doctrine of Parliamentary sovereignty does not allow for the judicial review of primary legislation (primarily Acts of Parliament). This limits judicial review in English law to the decisions of officials and public bodies, and secondary (delegated) legislation, against which ordinary common law remedies, and special "prerogative orders", are available in certain circumstances.

The constitutional theory of judicial review has long been dominated by the doctrine of ultra vires, under which a decision of a public authority can only be set aside if it exceeds the powers granted to it by Parliament. The role of the courts was seen as enforcing the "will of Parliament" in accordance with the doctrine of Parliamentary sovereignty. However, the doctrine has been widely interpreted to include errors of law and of fact and the courts have also declared the decisions taken under the royal prerogative to be amenable to judicial review.

== Procedural requirements ==
Under the Civil Procedure Rules a claim (application) for judicial review will only be admissible if permission (leave) for judicial review is obtained from the High Court, which has supervisory jurisdiction over public authorities and tribunals. Permission may be refused if one of the following conditions is not satisfied:

1. The application must be made promptly and in any event within three months from the date when the grievance arose. Note that legislation can impose shorter time limits while a court may hold that an application made in less than three months may still be not prompt enough.
2. The applicant must have a sufficient interest in the matter to which the application relates. This requirement is also known as standing or, historically, by the Latin phrase locus standi.
3. The application must be concerned with a public law matter, i.e. the action must be based on some rule of public law, not purely (for example) tort or contract.

However, the Court will not necessarily refuse permission if one of the above conditions is in doubt. It may, in its discretion, examine all the circumstances of the case and see if the substantive grounds for judicial review are serious enough. Delay or lack of sufficient interest can also lead to the court refusing to grant a remedy after it had considered the case on the merits.

The pre-action protocol states that it is usual for the claimant to write a letter before claim to the proposed defendant. The purpose of the letter is to identify the issues in dispute and to avoid litigation where possible. The protocol specifies a template for the letter. It is usual to allow 14 days for a response. The parties should also consider whether alternative dispute resolution might provide a satisfactory alternative to litigation.

=== Standing ===
To bring a judicial review, a claimant must have standing. The Senior Courts Act 1981 requires that claimants must have a "sufficient interest in the matter to which the application relates". This is not merely discretionary—if the claimant lacks sufficient interest, the High Court lacks jurisdiction to grant permission to hear the claim. In some situations, legislation expressly specifies that certain parties can bring judicial review (such as potential contractors who might provide outsourced local authority services, per s.19 of the Local Government Act 1988) or places restrictions on them doing so.

Standing is relatively easy to establish in cases where a claimant seeks to challenge a decision that interferes with their rights or where it has financial costs to them. More complicated are cases brought by campaigners, charities or public interest groups: permission was granted in R v Secretary of State for Foreign and Commonwealth Affairs, ex parte Rees-Mogg over a challenge to the ratification of the Maastricht Treaty, as well as in R v Secretary of State for Foreign and Commonwealth Affairs, ex parte World Development Movement Ltd over the granting of foreign aid to Malaysia to build the Pergau Dam. More recently, there has been a more restrictive attitude to standing, such as in some cases involving campaign group the Good Law Project, and the split decision in the Supreme Court over abortion in Northern Ireland.

=== Styling of the claimant ===
Unlike other civil proceedings in English courts, in judicial review court papers the claimant is styled as The King (on the application of Claimant X) (or Queen when reigning). For example, The King (on the application of Claimant X) v Defendant Y or more succinctly R (on the application of Claimant X) v Defendant Y or R (Claimant Y) v Defendant Y.

In citations The King is usually abbreviated R (standing for the Latin regina or rex, but pronounced "Crown"), Claimant X is substituted for the name of the claimant (e.g. Helena Jones or Jones or Acme Widgets Ltd) and Defendant Y is substituted for the public body whose decision is being challenged (e.g. West Sussex County Council or Environment Agency) or in certain cases, the title of the person in charge of that body (e.g. Secretary of State for the Home Department or Chief Constable of West Yorkshire Police).

This is a purely cosmetic formality that arises from a historical procedure where His Majesty's Judiciary acted on his behalf in a supervisory capacity. Technically a judicial review is brought by the Crown, on the application of the claimant, to ensure that powers are being properly exercised. Before 2001, judicial review cases were styled R v Defendant Y, ex parte Claimant X, but this was reformed as part of a general reduction in use of Latin legal terms and due to the fact that such hearings are not, in fact, ex parte in any meaningful sense.

=== Amenability to judicial review ===
The decision complained of must have been taken by a public body, i.e. a body established by statute or otherwise exercising a public function. In R v Panel for Takeovers and Mergers, ex parte Datafin [1987] 1 QB 815, the Court of Appeal held that a privately established panel was amenable to judicial review because it in fact operated as an integral part of a governmental framework for regulating mergers and takeovers, while those affected had no choice but to submit to its jurisdiction.

Actions taken under the royal prerogative were traditionally thought to be nonjusticiable political matters and thus not subject to judicial review, but Council of Civil Service Unions v Minister for the Civil Service [1984] UKHL 9 established that they can be, depending on the purpose for which the prerogative powers are exercised.

=== Ouster clauses ===
Sometimes the legislature may want to exclude the courts from reviewing administrative decisions, making them final, binding and not appealable. However, the courts have consistently held that none but the clearest words can exclude judicial review. When the Government wanted to introduce a new Asylum and Immigration Act containing such clear words, members of the judiciary protested to the extent of saying that they will not accept even such an exclusion. The Government withdrew the proposal.

The courts however do uphold time limits on applications for judicial review.

=== Exclusivity rule ===
The House of Lords held in O'Reilly v Mackman (1983) that where public law rights were at stake, the claimants could only proceed by way of judicial review. They could not originate their action under the general civil law procedure, because that would be avoiding the procedural safeguards afforded to public authorities by the judicial review procedure, such as the requirement of sufficient interest, timely submission and permission for judicial review. However, a defendant may still raise public law issues as a defence in civil proceedings. So, for example, in Wandsworth London Borough Council v Winder (1984) the House of Lords found that it was not an abuse of process for a tenant of a public authority to allege illegality of its decision to raise the rents as a counterclaim in the authority's suit against him for failing to pay under the tenancy contracts. He was not required to commence a separate judicial review process.

If an issue is a mix of private law rights, such as the right to get paid under a contract, and public law issues of the competence of the public authority to take the impugned decision, the courts are also inclined to allow the claimant to proceed using ordinary civil procedure, at least where it can be demonstrated that the public interest of protecting authorities against frivolous or late claims has not been breached (Roy v Kensington and Chelsea and Westminster Family Practitioner Committee (1992), Trustees of the Dennis Rye Pension Fund v Sheffield City Council (1997)).

== Grounds for review ==
In Council of Civil Service Unions v Minister for the Civil Service [1985] AC 374, Lord Diplock summarised the grounds for reversing an administrative decision by way of judicial review as follows:

- Illegality
- Irrationality (unreasonableness)
- Procedural impropriety
- Legitimate expectation

The first two grounds are known as substantive grounds of judicial review because they relate to the substance of the disputed decision. Procedural impropriety is a procedural ground because it is aimed at the decision-making procedure rather than the content of the decision itself. Those grounds are mere indications: the same set of facts may give rise to more than one ground for judicial review.

=== Illegality ===
In Lord Diplock's words, this ground means that the decision maker "must understand correctly the law that regulates his decision-making power and must give effect to it".

A decision may be illegal for many different reasons. There are no hard and fast rules for their classification, but the most common examples of cases where the courts hold administrative decisions to be unlawful are the following:

==== The decision is made by the wrong person (unlawful sub-delegation) ====
If the law empowers a particular authority, e.g. a minister, to make certain decisions, the minister cannot subdelegate this power to another authority, e.g. an executive officer or a committee. This differs from a routine job not involving much discretion being done by civil servants in the minister's name, which is not considered delegation.

An example of when this happened was in Allingham v Minister of Agriculture and Fisheries where a notice preventing farmers from growing sugar beet was unlawful because the power to put up the sign was delegated by the original committee. Where a decision is made by a properly empowered department within a local council, s.101 of the Local Government Act 2003 allows for delegation.

==== Jurisdiction: Error of law or error of fact ====
The court will quash a decision where the authority has misunderstood a legal term or incorrectly evaluated a fact that is essential for deciding whether or not it has certain powers. In R v Secretary of State for the Home Department, ex parte Khawaja (1984), the House of Lords held that the question as to whether the applicants were "illegal immigrants" was a question of fact that had to be positively proved by the Home Secretary before he could use the power to expel them. The power depended on them being "illegal immigrants" and any error in relation to that fact took the Home Secretary outside his jurisdiction to expel them.

However, where a term to be evaluated by the authority is so broad and vague that reasonable people may reasonably disagree about its meaning, it is generally for the authority to evaluate its meaning. For example, in R v Hillingdon Borough Council, ex parte Pulhofer (1986), the local authority had to provide homeless persons with accommodation. The applicants were a married couple, who lived with their two children in one room and applied to the local authority for aid. The local authority refused aid because it considered that the Pulhofers were not homeless and the House of Lords upheld this decision because whether the applicants had accommodation was a question of fact for the authority to determine.

==== The decision maker went beyond their power: ultra vires ====
The classic example of this is Attorney General v Fulham Corporation (1921) where Fulham council had the power to set up wash-houses for those without the facilities. They decided to charge people to use it. The court held they went beyond their power by trying to benefit commercially from something that was supposed to be for everyone.

Another example of this is the case of R v Secretary of State for Foreign and Commonwealth Affairs, ex parte World Development Movement Ltd. Section 1 of the Overseas Development and Co-operation Act 1980 empowered the Foreign Secretary to assign funds for development aid of economically sound projects. The Secretary of State assigned the funds for a project to construct a power station on the Pergau River in Malaysia (see Pergau Dam) which was considered uneconomic and not sound. The House of Lords held that this was not the purpose envisaged by the enabling statute and the minister therefore exceeded his powers. A similar principle exists in many continental legal systems and is known by the French name of détournement de pouvoir.

==== Ignoring relevant considerations or taking irrelevant considerations into account ====
This ground is closely connected to illegality as a result of powers being used for the wrong purpose. For example, in Wheeler v Leicester City Council, the city council banned a rugby club from using its ground because three of the club's members intended to go on a tour in South Africa at the time of apartheid. In R v Somerset County Council, ex parte Fewings the local authority decided to ban stag hunting on the grounds of it being immoral. In Padfield v Ministry of Agriculture, Fisheries and Food, the minister refused to mount an inquiry into a certain matter because he was afraid of bad publicity. In R v Inner London Education Authority, ex parte Westminster City Council, the London Education Authority used its powers to inform the public for the purpose of convincing the public of its political point of view.

In all these cases, the authorities based their decisions on considerations which were not relevant to their decision making power and acted unreasonably. This may also be qualified as having used their powers for an improper purpose.

Note that the improper purpose or the irrelevant consideration must be such as to materially influence the decision. Where the improper purpose is not of such material influence, the authority may be held to be acting within its lawful discretion. Hence in R v Broadcasting Complaints Commission, ex parte Owen [1985] QB 1153, the broadcasting authority refused to consider a complaint that a political party has been given too little broadcasting time mainly for good reasons, but also with some irrelevant considerations, which however were not of material influence on the decision.

==== Fettering discretion ====
An authority will be acting unreasonably where it refuses to hear applications or makes certain decisions without taking individual circumstances into account by reference to a certain policy. When an authority is given discretion, it cannot bind itself as to the way in which this discretion will be exercised either by internal policies or obligations to others. Even though an authority may establish internal guidelines, it should be prepared to make exceptions on the basis of every individual case.

=== Irrationality ===
Under Lord Diplock's classification, a decision is irrational if it is "so outrageous in its defiance of logic or of accepted moral standards that no sensible person who had applied his mind to the question could have arrived at it." This standard is also known as Wednesbury unreasonableness, after the decision in Associated Provincial Picture Houses Ltd v Wednesbury Corporation, where it was first imposed.

Unlike illegality and procedural impropriety, the courts under this head look at the merits of the decision, rather than at the procedure by which it was arrived at or the legal basis on which it was founded. The question to ask is whether the decision "makes sense", although the bar for the public authority to clear in this regard is very low. In many circumstances listed under "illegality", the decision may also be considered irrational.

==== Proportionality ====
Proportionality is a requirement that a decision is proportionate to the aim that it seeks to achieve. For example, an order to forbid a protest march on the grounds of public safety should not be made if there is an alternative way of protecting public safety, such as by assigning an alternative route for the march. Proportionality exists as a ground for setting aside administrative decisions in most continental legal systems and is recognised in England in cases where issues of retained EU law and human rights are involved. However, it is not as yet a separate ground of judicial review, although Lord Diplock has alluded to the possibility of it being recognised as such in the future. At present, lack of proportionality may be used as an argument for a decision being irrational.

=== Procedural impropriety ===
A decision suffers from procedural impropriety if in the process of its making the procedures prescribed by statute have not been followed or if the "rules of natural justice" have not been adhered to.

==== Statutory procedures ====
An Act of Parliament may subject the making of a certain decision to a procedure, such as the holding of a public hearing or inquiry, or a consultation with an external adviser. Some decisions may be subject to approval by a higher body. Courts distinguish between "mandatory" requirements and "directory" requirements. A breach of mandatory procedural requirements will lead to a decision being set aside for procedural impropriety.

==== Breach of natural justice ====
The rules of natural justice require that the decision maker approaches the decision making process with "fairness". What is fair in relation to a particular case may differ. As pointed out by Lord Bridge in Lloyd v McMahon, "the rules of natural justice are not engraved on tablets of stone". Below are some examples of what the rules of natural justice require:

===== The rule against bias =====
The first basic rule of natural justice is that nobody may be a judge in his own case. Any person that makes a judicial decision – and this includes a decision of a public authority on a request for a licence – must not have any personal interest in the outcome of the decision. If such interest is present, the decision maker must be disqualified even if no actual bias can be shown, i.e. it is not demonstrated that the interest has influenced the decision. The test as to whether the decision should be set aside is whether there is a "real possibility [of bias]", as established in Gough v Chief Constable of the Derbyshire Constabulary [2001], which dropped the 'fair-minded observer' part of the test.

===== The right to a fair hearing =====
Whether or not a person was given a fair hearing of his case will depend on the circumstances and the type of the decision to be made. The minimum requirement is that the person gets the chance to present his case. If the applicant has certain legitimate expectations, for example to have his licence renewed, the rules of natural justice may also require that they are given an oral hearing and that their request may not be rejected without giving reasons. This was the principle in the case of Ridge v Baldwin.

===== Duty to give reasons =====
Unlike many other legal systems, English administrative law does not recognise a general duty to give reasons for a decision of a public authority. A duty to give reasons may be imposed by statute. Where it is not, common law may imply such a duty and the courts do so particularly with regard to judicial and quasi-judicial decisions.

=== Legitimate expectations ===
A legitimate expectation will arise when a person (or a group or class of persons) has been led by a policy, promise or representation of a public body to understand that, for example, certain steps will be followed in reaching a decision.

Considerations of legitimate expectations:

1. When an individual or a group has been led to think that certain steps will apply.
2. When an individual or a group relies on a policy or guidelines which govern an area of past executive action.

The above principle has been recognized in the case of R v Liverpool Corporation, ex parte Liverpool Taxi Fleet Operators Association.

The court may uphold not only a legitimate expectation that a certain procedure would be followed by a public body ("procedural" expectations), but also an expectation of some substantive benefit. In a leading case in 2001 on the latter point, Ms Coughlan, having been badly injured in a car accident, was promised a "home for life" by the health authority when she was transferred from the hospital to a care home. When the authority tried to evict her later, the court held the authority to their promise, since to frustrate Ms Coughlan's legitimate expectation would be unfair in the circumstances.

=== Possibility of additional grounds of review ===
It has been suggested that proportionality (which is now expressly cited as a doctrine of review only in human rights cases and cases with an EU dimension) should become a separate general head of review.

There is some authority for the proposition that the courts employ a normative legal concept of "moral desert". Dr Kennefick of Queen's College, Oxford has posited that the essential question that the courts ask themselves is this: "did they deserve it?" When both parties deserve it, the secondary inquiry is "who deserved it more?" On the unlikely occurrence of equal moral desert existing between two parties, the courts should, Kennefick argues, be able to give both parties a remedy.

== Remedies ==
The following remedies are available in proceedings for judicial review:

- Quashing order
- Prohibiting order
- Mandatory order
- Declaration
- Injunction
- Damages (only available if sought on non-judicial review grounds)

In any case more than one remedy can be applied for; however, the granting of all remedies is entirely at the court’s discretion.

=== Quashing order ===
A quashing order (formerly a writ of certiorari) nullifies a decision which has been made by a public body. The effect is to make the decision completely invalid. Such an order is usually made where an authority has acted outside the scope of its powers (ultra vires). The most common order made in successful judicial review proceedings is a quashing order. If the court makes a quashing order it can send the case back to the original decision maker directing it to remake the decision in light of the court’s findings. Very rarely, if there is no purpose in sending the case back, it may take the decision itself.

=== Prohibiting order ===
A prohibiting order (formerly a writ of prohibition) is similar to a quashing order in that it prevents a tribunal or authority from acting beyond the scope of its powers. The key difference is that a prohibiting order acts prospectively by telling an authority not to do something in contemplation. Examples of where prohibiting orders may be appropriate include stopping the implementation of a decision in breach of natural justice, or to prevent a local authority licensing indecent films, or to prevent the deportation of someone whose immigration status has been wrongly decided.

=== Mandatory order ===
A mandatory order (formerly a writ of mandamus) compels public authorities to fulfill their duties. Whereas quashing and prohibition orders deal with wrongful acts, a mandatory order addresses wrongful failure to act. A mandatory order is similar to a mandatory injunction (below) as they are orders from the court requiring an act to be performed. Failure to comply is punishable as a contempt of court. Examples of where a mandatory order might be appropriate include: compelling an authority to assess a disabled person's needs, to approve building plans, or to improve conditions of imprisonment.

A mandatory order may be made in conjunction with a quashing order. For example, where a local authority's decision is quashed because the decision was made outside its powers, the court may simultaneously order the local authority to remake the decision within the scope of its powers.

=== Declaration ===
A declaration is a judgment by the Administrative Court which clarifies the respective rights and obligations of the parties to the proceedings, without actually making any order. Unlike the remedies of quashing, prohibiting and mandatory order the court is not telling the parties to do anything in a declaratory judgment. For example, if the court declared that a proposed rule by a local authority was unlawful, a declaration would not resolve the legal position of the parties in the proceedings. Subsequently, if the authority were to proceed ignoring the declaration, the applicant who obtained the declaration would not have to comply with the unlawful rule and the quashing, prohibiting and mandatory orders would be available.

=== Injunction ===
An injunction is an order made by the court to stop a public body from acting in an unlawful way. Less commonly, an injunction can be mandatory, that is, it compels a public body to do something. Where there is an imminent risk of damage or loss, and other remedies would not be sufficient, the court may grant an interim injunction to protect the position of the parties before going to a full hearing. If an interim injunction is granted pending final hearing, it is possible that the side which benefits from the injunction will be asked to give an undertaking that if the other side is successful at the final hearing, the party which had the benefit of the interim protection can compensate the other party for its losses. This does not happen where the claimant relies on legal aid.

=== Damages ===
Damages are available as a remedy in judicial review in limited circumstances. Compensation is not available merely because a public authority has acted unlawfully. For damages to be available there must be either:

1. a recognised private law cause of action such as negligence or breach of statutory duty; or
2. a claim under European law or the Human Rights Act 1998.

=== Discretion ===
The discretionary nature of the remedies stated above means that even if a court finds a public body has acted wrongly, it does not have to grant any remedy. Examples of where discretion will be exercised against an applicant may include where the applicant's own conduct has been unmeritorious or unreasonable, for example where the applicant has unreasonably delayed in applying for judicial review, where the applicant has not acted in good faith, where a remedy would impede an authority's ability to deliver fair administration, or where the judge considers that an alternative remedy could have been pursued.
