= Matthew Maynard =

English cricketer and coach

Matthew Maynard MBE
Personal information
- Full name: Matthew Peter Maynard
- Born: 21 March 1966 (age 60); Oldham, Lancashire, England
- Height: 5 ft 10.5 in (1.79 m)
- Batting: Right-handed
- Bowling: Right-arm medium
- Role: Batsman
- Relatives: Tom Maynard (son)

International information
- National side: England (1988–2000)
- Test debut (cap 532): 4 August 1988 v West Indies
- Last Test: 19 February 1994 v West Indies
- ODI debut (cap 124): 16 February 1994 v West Indies
- Last ODI: 15 July 2000 v West Indies

Domestic team information
- Years: Team
- 1985–2005: Glamorgan
- 1990/91–1991/92: Northern Districts
- 1996/97–1997/98: Otago

Career statistics
Competition	Test	ODI	FC	LA
Matches	4	14	395	434
Runs scored	87	156	24,799	13,506
Batting average	10.87	14.18	42.53	36.80
100s/50s	0/0	0/0	59/131	16/81
Top score	35	41	243	151*
Balls bowled	–	–	1,171	307
Wickets	–	–	6	3
Bowling average	–	–	149.16	94.66
5 wickets in innings	–	–	0	0
10 wickets in match	–	–	0	0
Best bowling	–	–	3/21	1/13
Catches/stumpings	3/–	4/–	372/7	183/5
- Source: Cricinfo, 13 August 2009

Matthew Peter Maynard, MBE (born 21 March 1966) is an English cricket coach and former cricketer. He played in four Tests and fourteen ODIs for England.

Maynard was a batsman (and, later in his career, wicketkeeper) known for his aggressive and dashing strokeplay. His first-class career with Glamorgan, saw him achieve a batting average of 42.53, take 372 catches and make seven stumpings with the gloves, earned him several caps for England, but he was never able to translate his county form into Test success. He was named a Wisden Cricketer of the Year in 1998. He was the second batsman for Glamorgan to score a century on debut in a first-class match.

== Life and career ==
Born in Oldham, Lancashire, Maynard was brought up on the island of Anglesey in North Wales where he first joined Glamorgan. His career started in fine fashion when he hit a century on his debut in 1985, hitting three consecutive sixes to reach the 100 and he became the youngest-ever player to score 1,000 runs for the country in 1986. The 54 centuries he scored for Glamorgan during his playing career is also a record - the most any player has scored for the club. These displays of skill did not go unnoticed by the England selectors and he earned a call-up against the West Indies at the Oval in 1988. He was picked again in 1989 but then ran foul of the cricketing authorities by agreeing to go with Mike Gatting, on the controversial rebel tour of South Africa when that country had been banned from international sport because of its policy of apartheid. He later justified his decision by saying that he was desperate for a taste of international cricket having just been dropped from the England team. Nevertheless, his conduct led to a three-year Test ban, but he was eventually granted a recall for the Ashes series in 1993 after he had hit a century for Glamorgan against the Australians, but he failed to make much of an impact with the bat. He was however part of the England squad which won the Hong Kong Sixes in 1994.

Back in domestic cricket, Maynard captained Glamorgan for five seasons between 1995 and 2000. His achievement as captain included leading them to victory in the County Championship in 1997, and their first appearance since 1977 in a cup final at Lord's in 2000. That same year he earned one final recall to the England team, but only managed scores of 3 and 0 and it proved to be his last international appearance as a player.

In September 2004, he was appointed as assistant coach to the England cricket team, and announced his retirement as a player shortly after, feeling he no longer enjoyed batting. In his short spell as an international coach, he caused some controversy. His appointment was criticised by former England captain Mike Atherton, who felt that the job should not have gone to someone who had been on the rebel tour of South Africa. His attitude came under fire from former coach Keith Fletcher, who accused him of being too fond of drinking and partying, to be a role model for young international cricketers. He hit back at Fletcher, criticising his management skills. Maynard continued to coach the England side and at one point drafted in professional lyricists to help him compose an England team song.

After Duncan Fletcher's resignation following the 2007 Cricket World Cup, Maynard was replaced as England assistant coach in May 2007 by Andy Flower. In an interview following the announcement, Maynard said he had been offered a role with the Indian cricket academy.

He previously coached the Nashua Titans, one of the six South African domestic cricket franchises. He has enjoyed an extremely successful first season, winning the domestic four-day competition (Supersport Series) as well as the domestic T20 competition (MiWay T20 Challenge).

At the end of the 2014 season, following the departure of David Nosworthy, Maynard was appointed the Director of Cricket at Somerset County Cricket Club. After three seasons at the club Maynard left his role as coach of Somerset after the end of the 2017 season.

He was awarded the MBE in the 2019 New Year Honours.

His son Tom was found dead on 18 June 2012.

== Contemporary usage ==
Maynard was mentioned in the Manic Street Preachers' "Mr. Carbohydrate", the B-side of "A Design for Life", with the lyric, "Have you heard of Matthew Maynard/He's my favourite cricketer/I would rather watch him play than pick up my guitar".
