= Southfields =

Coordinates: 51.446°N 0.195°W

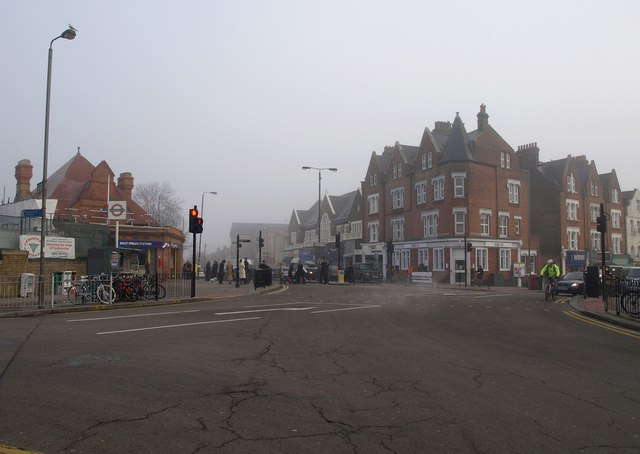
- Southfields tube station (left) on Wimbledon Park Road, 2010

- Location within Greater London
- Population: 13,474 (Southfield ward 2011)
- OS grid reference: TQ255735
- London borough: Wandsworth; Merton
- Ceremonial county: Greater London
- Region: London
- Country: England
- Sovereign state: United Kingdom
- Post town: LONDON
- Postcode district: SW18, SW19
- Dialling code: 020
- Police: Metropolitan
- Fire: London
- Ambulance: London
- UK Parliament: Putney and Wimbledon
- London Assembly: Merton and Wandsworth

Southfields is a district of inner London located within the London Borough of Wandsworth, England, 5.6 miles (9 km) south-west of Charing Cross, with a small portion of the area extending into the neighbouring London Borough of Merton. Southfields is mainly residential, historically a part of Wandsworth itself, and is divided between the SW18 and SW19 postcode areas.

== History ==
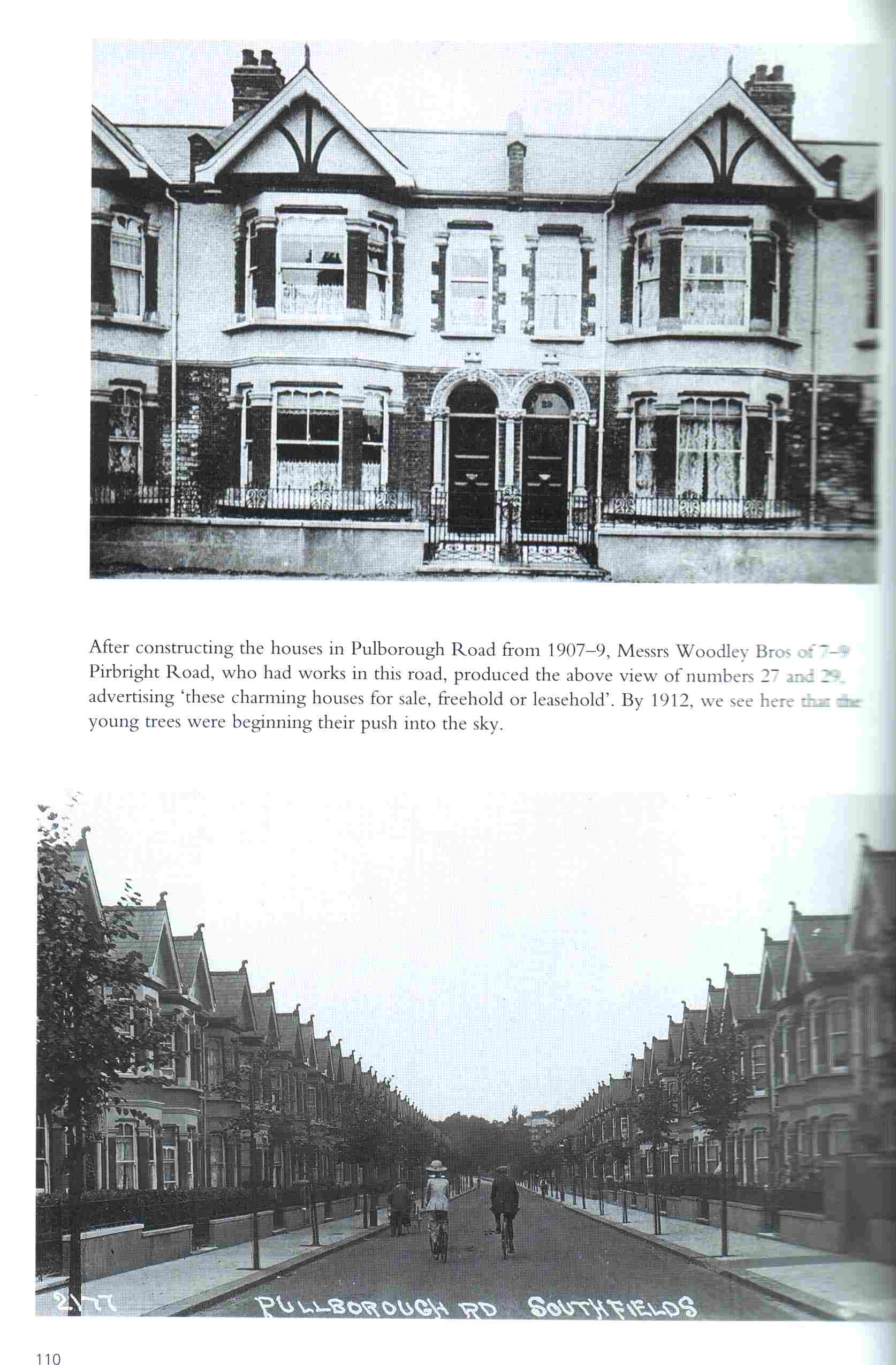
Photo taken in 1912

Until the late 19th century, Southfields remained open fields between the more developed villages of Wimbledon and Putney. Several former pathways through the fields form parts of today's road system, such as the historic path from Wimbledon to Wandsworth, which became Wimbledon Park Road and its continuation through Southfields Passage. Kimber Road and The Baulk were also field paths, visible on old maps of the area.

The opening of the District and London & South Western Railway from Wimbledon to Putney Bridge in June 1889 boosted development in the area. The first school opened a year later on Merton Road, another of the main thoroughfares that originated as field paths.

The main residential areas of Southfields are known as the "Southfields Triangle" and "The Grid."

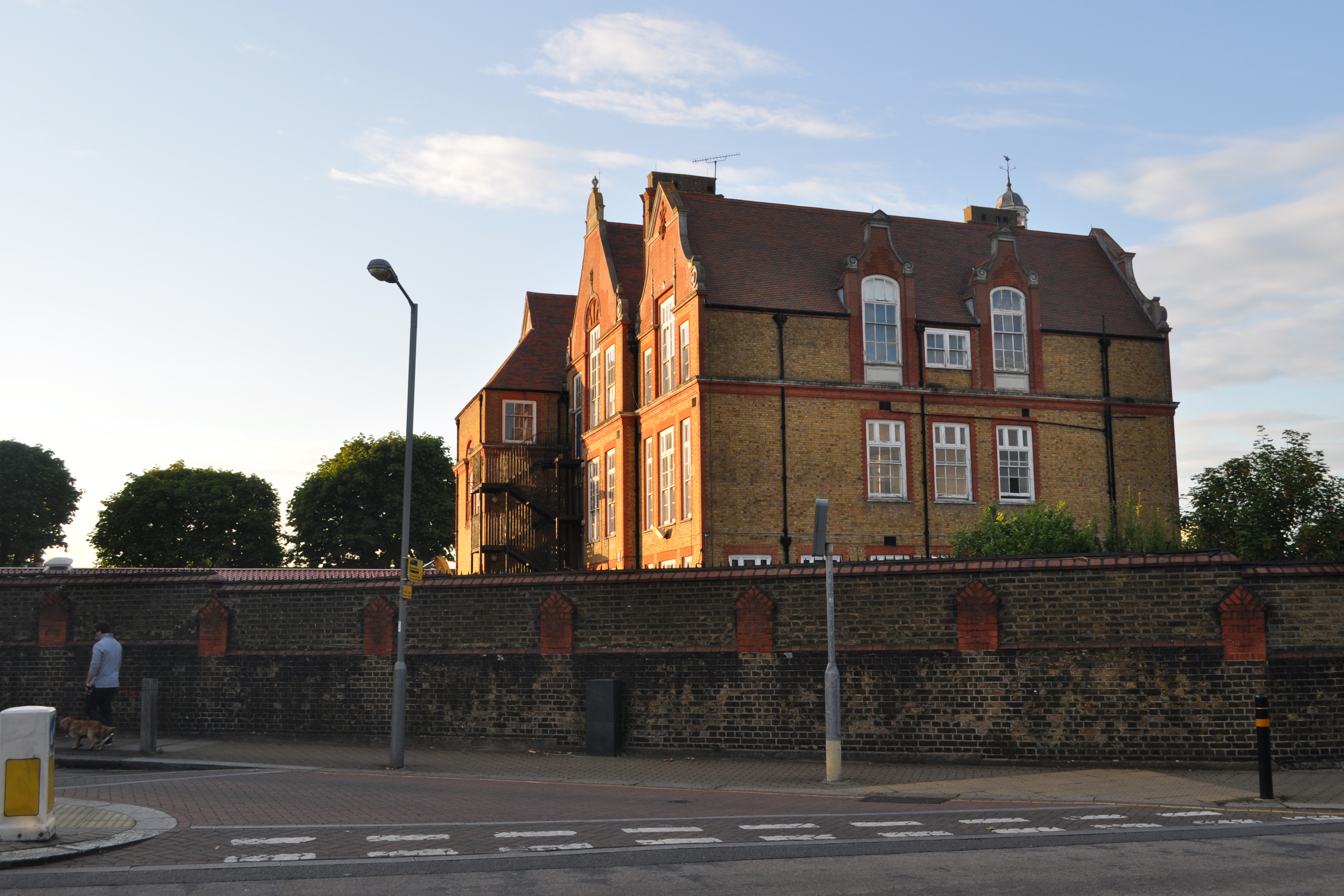
Riversdale Primary School on Merton Road is a Grade II listed building

The "Southfields Triangle" is an area defined by roads and streets roughly forming a triangle. It extends from Standen Road in the south (bordering Coronation Gardens) to Granville Road in the north, and from Pulborough Road in the west to Merton Road in the east. The Triangle consists almost entirely of Victorian and Edwardian houses. In 1904, the Frame Foods baby food company opened a factory on Standen Road. The building, in a distinctive Art Nouveau style with green ceramic tiles and the slogan "Nourish and Flourish," is Grade II listed and has been converted into flats. Standen Road was also home to the Ault & Wiborg printing ink factory. Some homes with south-facing gardens bordering Coronation Gardens have a notably quiet character.

"The Grid" is a series of parallel roads intersected by parallel streets. On 23 December 1891, London County Council approved an application from the Wimbledon Park Land Company for nine new streets: Replingham and Brookwood Roads and Astonville, Trentham, Elborough, Engadine, Clonmore, Heythorp and Elsenham. Construction was initially slow, despite the recent arrival of the railway, although by 1898 only Trentham and Elborough streets had failed to attract any builders. The Grid was extended southwards to Lavenham Road in 1899 and Revelstoke Road in 1903. Electrification of the District Railway sped up construction further, with the Grid being effectively completed by the middle of 1906, at which point it totalled 1766 houses, maisonettes and shops.

The building on the corner of Kimber Road and Merton Road once housed the OK Sauce factory until its takeover by Reckitt and Colman.

=== Toponymy ===
Southfields takes its name from the old manorial system, where it was known as the South Field of the manor of Dunsford. The earlier name for the area dates back at least to the year 1247. The equivalent North Field lay between West Hill and the River Thames and survives in the short road named Northfields which runs to the east of Wandsworth Park.

== Governance ==
A map showing the Southfield ward of Wandsworth Metropolitan Borough as it appeared in 1916.

Southfields is one of the 22 wards that make up the London Borough of Wandsworth, and it supplies two of the Borough Council's 58 councillors – the Conservative Party's Kim Caddy & Guy Humphries. It is part of the Merton and Wandsworth constituency for the London Assembly.

Southfields falls within the parliamentary constituency of Putney. The current Member of Parliament for the constituency is the Labour Party's Fleur Anderson, who was elected in 2019 with a majority of 4,774.

== Geography ==
Southfield's postcodes are split across the London Boroughs of Wandsworth and Merton. Of the two main parks, the above applies to Wimbledon Park whilst the second, King George's Park is situated wholly within the boundaries of Wandsworth. Tennis being a part of the fabric of Southfields life, both parks are home to a large number of public tennis courts. Wimbledon Park has an athletic track and a landscaped lake that is home to a number of water sports. The smaller but historic Coronation Gardens bordering the southern edge of the Southfields triangle commemorates the coronation of King Edward VII in August 1902.

== Demography ==
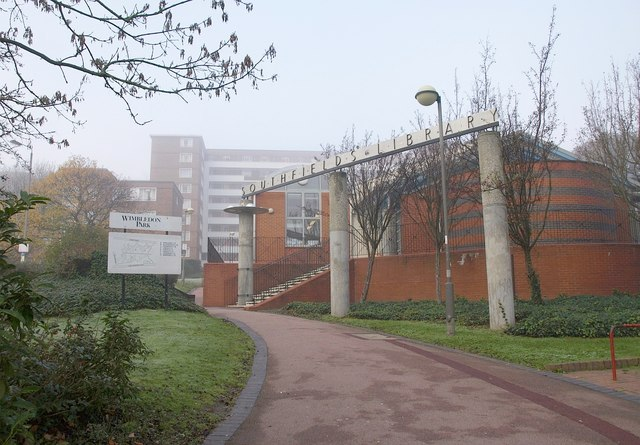
Entrance to Southfields Library

According to the 2011 census the ward of Southfields had a population of 17,962. The population of the area is largely white in its ethnic origins, at 75.6%.

The area is also home to a significant white South African community.

== Transport ==
The A3 trunk road runs south west towards Portsmouth and north east into central London along Southfields' northern edge; the district is bounded by the A218 (Merton Road) to the east and the A219 (Parkside Avenue) to the west.

Southfields is served by bus routes 39 (Clapham Junction to Putney Bridge, operated by London General), 493 (Tooting, St George’s Hospital to Richmond, operated by London General) and 156 (Vauxhall to Wimbledon, operated by Transport UK London Bus).

Southfields tube station is in London fare zone 3 of the London Underground network, situated between East Putney and Wimbledon Park on the Wimbledon branch of the District line. Southfields is the main London Underground station for the Wimbledon Tennis Championships. A five-minute walk takes spectators from Southfields Tube down Wimbledon Park Road to the All England Lawn Tennis and Croquet Club.

Southfields is not served by the National Rail network; the nearest National Rail stations are Earlsfield, Wimbledon and Putney.

== Popular culture ==
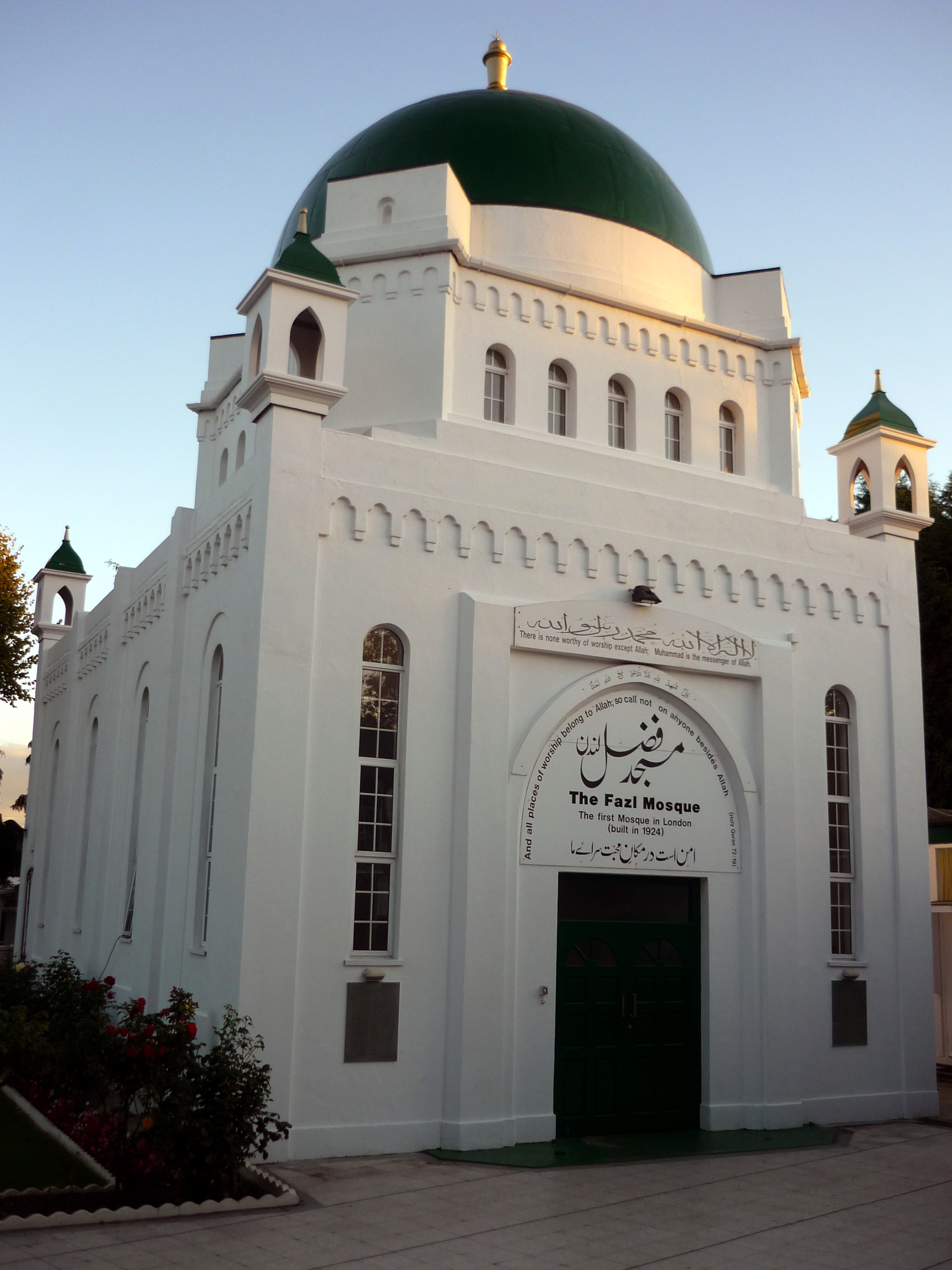
Fazl Mosque

Part of the video for Shampoo's 1994 hit single ‘Trouble’ was filmed in Southfields.

The former cinema premises on Wimbledon Park Road, most recently used as a snooker club, were demolished following a successful planning application from the owners of the site, despite a three-year campaign by a local group to convert the building back to a local cinema, which would have been named The Southfields Plaza.

In 1926 Southfields became home to London's first mosque. The Fazl Mosque, also known as the London Mosque, was built by the Ahmadiyya Muslim Community and served as the international headquarters of the community until 2019, when the headquarters moved to Farnham.

The band Lawson's debut album was named after Chapman Square SW19.

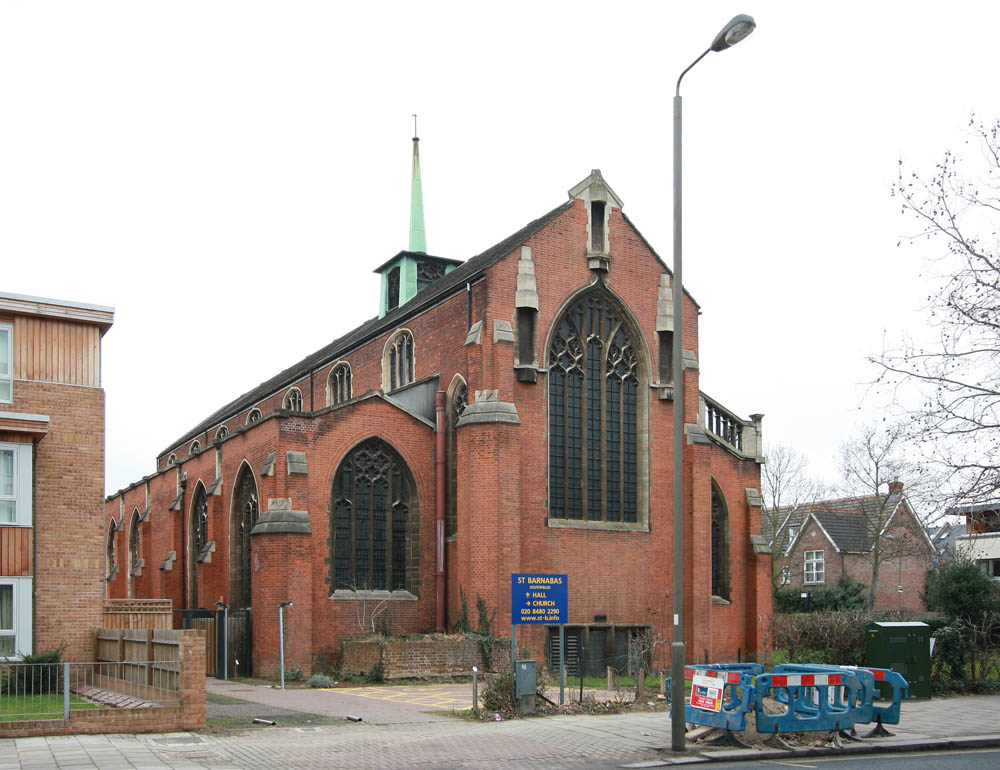
St Barnabas Church, Merton Road
