= Action for World Development =

Australian organization

Action for World Development was an Australian interdenominational initiative to promote world development.

It began with the establishment of the Joint Secretariat for World Development, which set up and ran a study program in 1972. Subsequently, a fund-raising organisation, Force 10, was formed to focus on funding existing programs rather than duplicate them. Force 10 later joined the existing organisation Community Aid Abroad (CAA) (formerly Food for Peace Campaign and now Oxfam Australia).
