= Southfields tube station =

London Underground station

Southfields
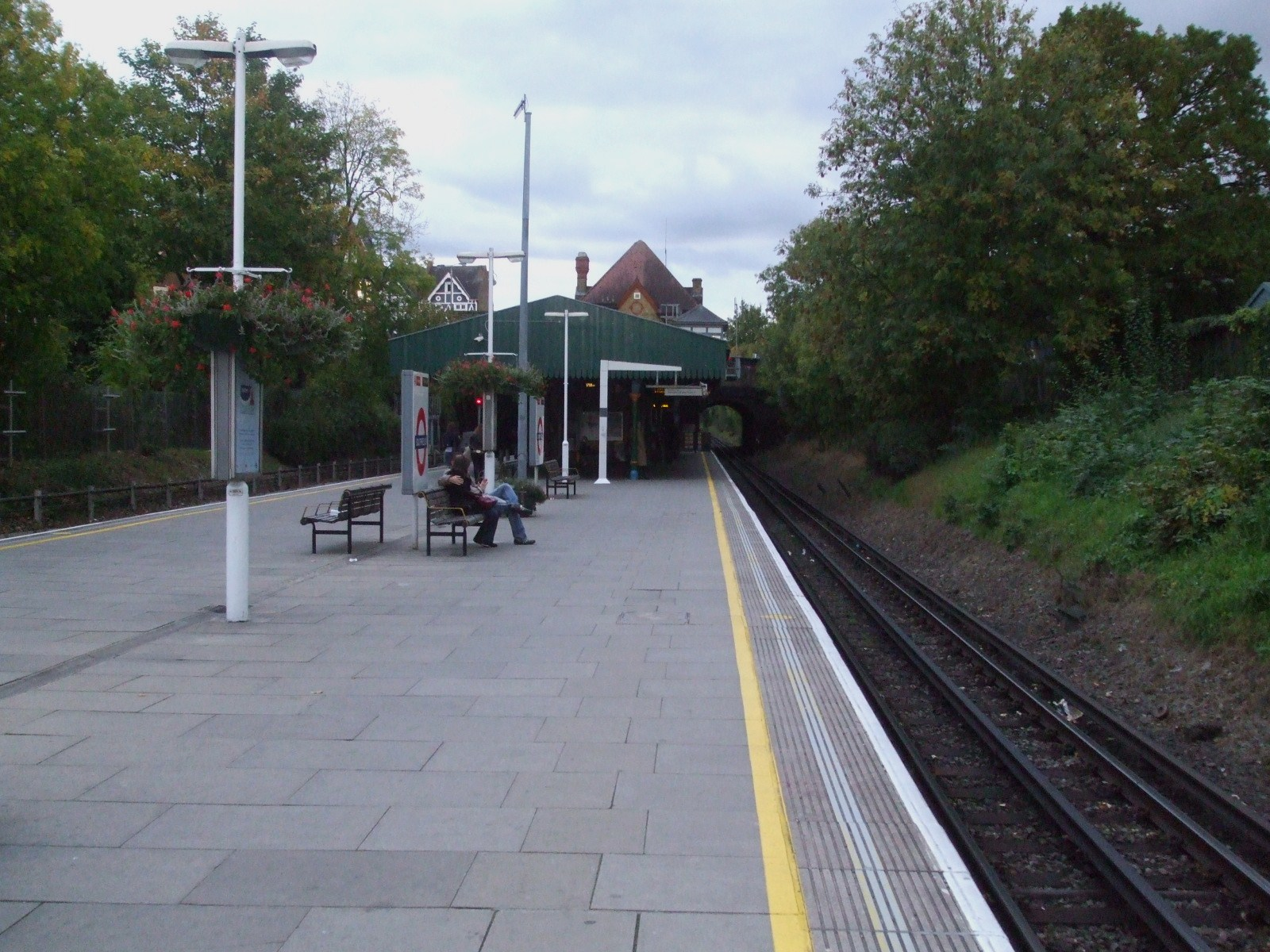
- District line northbound platform at the station
- Interactive map of Southfields

General information
- Location: Southfields
- Local authority: London Borough of Wandsworth
- Managed by: London Underground
- Number of platforms: 2
- Accessible: Yes
- Fare zone: 3

London Underground annual entry and exit
- 2020: ▼2.90 million
- 2021: ▼2.70 million
- 2022: ▲4.45 million
- 2023: ▲4.73 million
- 2024: ▲5.14 million

Railway companies
- Original company: London and South Western Railway
- Pre-grouping: London and South Western Railway
- Post-grouping: Southern Railway

Key dates
- 3 June 1889: Opened (DR)
- 1 July 1889: Started (LSWR)
- 4 May 1941: Ended (SR)
- 1 April 1994: Transferred to LUL

Other information
- External links: TfL station info page
- Coordinates: 51.4450°N 0.2070°W

Southfields is a London Underground station in Southfields in the London Borough of Wandsworth. It is on the Wimbledon branch of the District line, between Wimbledon Park and East Putney stations. The station is located on Wimbledon Park Road at the junction with Augustus Road and Replingham Road. It is in London fare zone 3.

Southfields is the most convenient station from which to reach the All England Lawn Tennis and Croquet Club, venue of the Wimbledon Tennis Championships; Wimbledon Park station is slightly closer as the crow flies but requires a longer walk. During the tournament, more than three times the usual numbers of passengers pass through the station.

== History ==
The station was opened by the District Railway (DR, now the District line) on 3 June 1889 on an extension from Putney Bridge station to Wimbledon. The extension was built by the London and South Western Railway (L&SWR) which, starting on 1 July 1889, ran its own trains over the line from a connection at East Putney to its Clapham Junction to Barnes line. The LSWR acronym, along with the year of its opening, is still visible on the station's brick façade.

The section of the District line from Putney Bridge to Wimbledon was the last part of the line to be converted from steam operation to electric. Electric trains began running on 27 August 1905.

Main line services through Southfields were ended by the Southern Railway (successor to the L&SWR) on 4 May 1941, although the line remained in British Rail ownership until 1 April 1994 when it was transferred to London Underground. Until the transfer, the station was branded as a British Rail station.

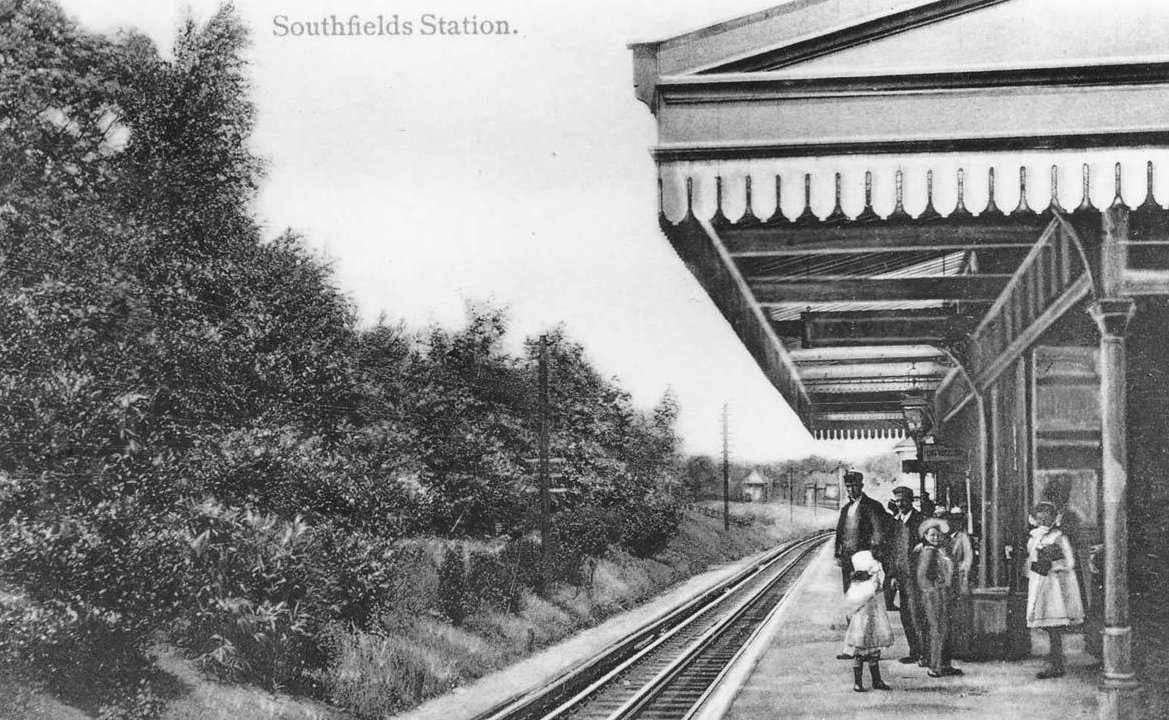
Southfields railway station about 1910

The route from Wimbledon to Wandsworth Town (Point Pleasant Junction) is still used by South Western Railway for empty stock movements and occasional service train diversions, as well as three daily SWR services which run to and from Waterloo via the route in the early hours of the morning without stopping at Southfields. There are very infrequent movements of Network Rail engineering trains and light engine movements through the station as well.

It was once planned that the potential Chelsea–Hackney line would call at Southfields, by supplementing or replacing the existing District line service. These plans have since been superseded by the planned Crossrail 2 line, which would serve Wimbledon.

== Station upgrade ==
The station was upgraded in the early 2010s, with a new lift providing step free access. This work was done in preparation for the 2012 Olympic Games, when the Olympic Tennis Tournament was held at the All England Club. The upgrade will also improve access to the annual Wimbledon tennis tournament.

Overall refurbishment and extension works to the station started in March 2009, and finished in late 2010. The shops formerly located on the eastern side of the street-level building were demolished and the site used for a new ticket office, relocated from the western side of the booking hall. A lift runs from the booking hall to platform level, making the station step free. A new standard Underground ticket gateline was also installed.

== Design changes ==
Southfields Station and Wimbledon Park station are of almost identical original design, although a mirror image of one another, but both stations have since been altered. Southfields Station has changed the most due to high passenger traffic during Wimbledon Tennis. The left side of the staircase at Southfields was widened (with the extension being built out of wood rather than brick construction) the pillar in the left side of the staircase was originally an external feature. A second doorway was opened up to the west of the original doorway into the ticket office area and a short footbridge was built from the top of the staircase over the railway to Wimbledon Park Road. (In recent times the footbridge had been closed and used as a storage area but after London Underground took over the station they reopened it as an exit.) The southern end of the waiting room on the platform has been converted into a kiosk and the rest of the building is used for LUL staff accommodation. There is therefore no enclosed public waiting facility on the platform.

After Southfields Station was transferred from British Rail to London Underground in 1994 a temporary ticket office was built to the west of the station on a heavy steel frame above the track and the parapet wall of the bridge was removed to allow public access to the ticket office from the pavement whilst extensive alterations were carried out to the booking hall area. The temporary ticket office was taken down once no longer required and the brick parapet wall reinstated, but the steelwork was retained for several years and used to support a number of temporary structures in connection with later station refurbishment works before finally being dismantled in June 2013.

The station platform undergoes a makeover each year to coincide with the tournament, funded by a particular company for advertising purposes. For instance, in 2006, the station platform was covered in red flooring, as were the benches, because of American Express's advertising campaign for a credit card that supports an AIDS charity. In 2005, Televisions were installed and played non-stop adverts, also for American Express. In 2009, the makeover was funded by HSBC. In 2010 it was funded by Asda and advertised their strawberries.

== Connections ==
- London Buses routes 39, 493 (which has a bus stop at the AELTC) and 639 serve the station.
- During the two weeks of Wimbledon Tennis a shuttle bus runs from Southfields Station to the tennis courts. Travelcards and bus passes are not accepted on this bus.

Automated train announcements state that Southfields is the station at which to alight for the "Wimbledon Lawn Tennis Club" (rather than the club's actual name, the All England Lawn Tennis and Croquet Club) as it is an easy 10–15 minutes' walk along a main road to the club and Southfields is better set up for large crowds than Wimbledon Park station.

Preceding station	London Underground	Following station
Wimbledon Park towards Wimbledon	District line Wimbledon branch	East Putney towards Edgware Road or Upminster
