= Wimbledon Park tube station =

London Underground station

Wimbledon Park
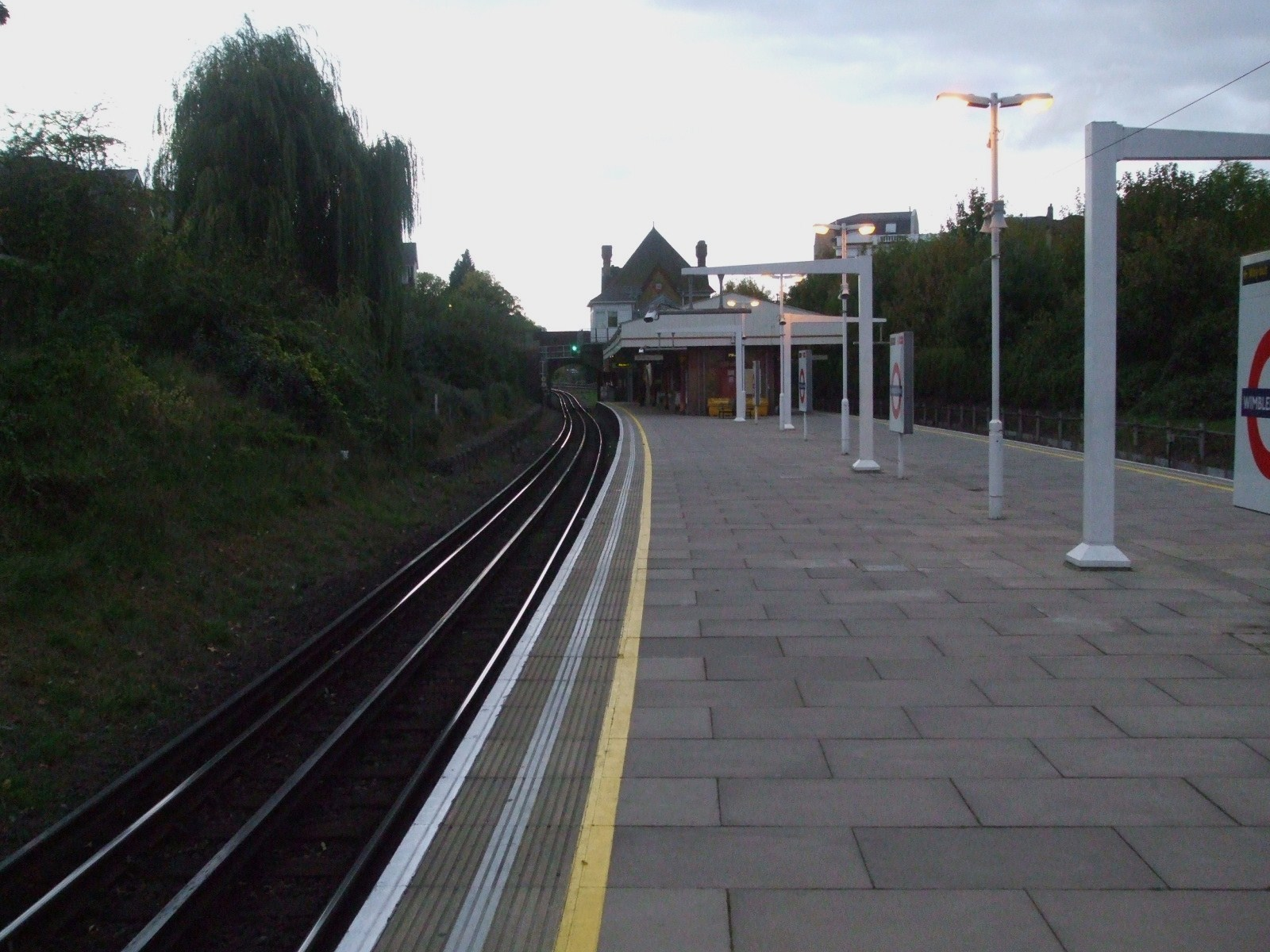
- District line northbound platform at the station
- Interactive map of Wimbledon Park

General information
- Location: Wimbledon Park
- Local authority: London Borough of Merton
- Managed by: London Underground
- Number of platforms: 2
- Accessible: Yes
- Fare zone: 3

London Underground annual entry and exit
- 2020: ▼1.14 million
- 2021: ▼1.05 million
- 2022: ▲1.70 million
- 2023: ▲1.84 million
- 2024: 1.84 million

Key dates
- 3 June 1889: Opened (DR)
- 1 July 1889: Started (L&SWR)
- 4 May 1941: Ended (SR)
- 1 April 1994: Transferred to LUL

Other information
- External links: TfL station info page
- Coordinates: 51.434°N 0.200°W

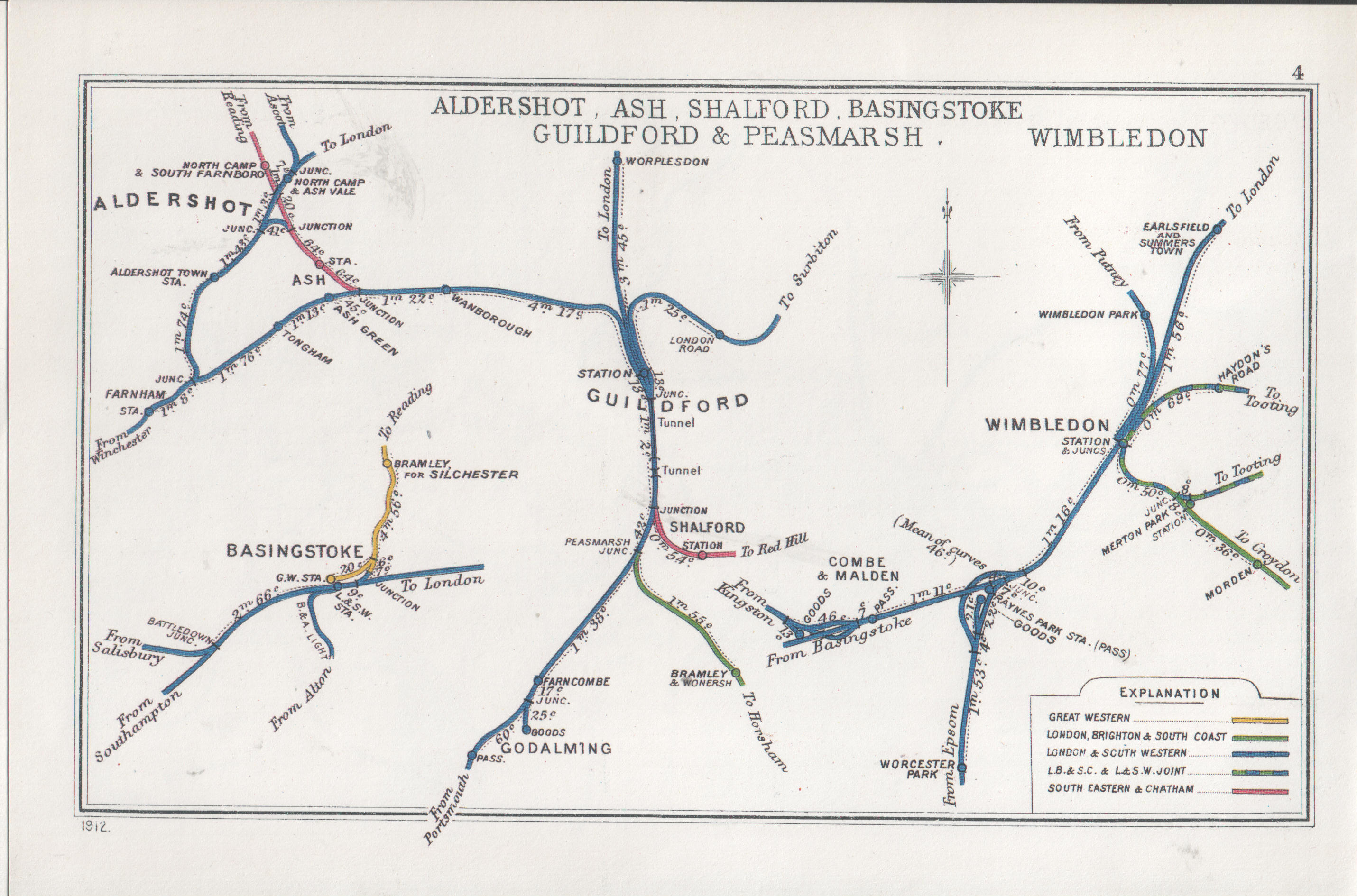
A 1912 Railway Clearing House map of lines around Wimbledon Park railway station.

Wimbledon Park is a London Underground station in Wimbledon, south-west London. It is on the Wimbledon branch of the District line, between Wimbledon and Southfields stations. The station is located on Arthur Road close to the junction with Melrose Avenue close to the eastern side of Wimbledon Park. It is about 200 metres (660 ft) west of Durnsford Road (A218) and is in London fare zone 3.

== History ==
The station was opened by the District Railway (DR, now the District line) on 3 June 1889 on an extension from Putney Bridge to Wimbledon. The extension was built by the London and South Western Railway (L&SWR) which, starting on 1 July 1889, ran its own trains over the line from a connection at East Putney to its Clapham Junction to Barnes line.

The section of the District line from Putney Bridge to Wimbledon was the last part of the line to be converted from steam operation to electric. Electric trains began running on 27 August 1905.

Main line services through Wimbledon Park ended on 4 May 1941. By then, the station was on a line of the Southern Railway (successor to the L&SWR), although the line remained in British Rail ownership until 1 April 1994 when it was transferred to London Underground. Until the transfer, the station was branded as a British Rail station. The route from Wimbledon to Wandsworth Town (Point Pleasant Junction) is still used by South Western Railway for empty stock movements and occasional service train diversions, as well as three daily South Western Railway services which run to and from Waterloo via the route in the early hours of the morning; so South Western Railway trains pass through Wimbledon Park station on a daily basis, but without stopping. There are very infrequent movements of Network Rail engineering trains and light engine movements through the station as well.

On 18 June 2012, Surrey cricketer Tom Maynard was electrocuted and hit by a London Underground train while trying to escape from police near Wimbledon Park station.

In 2018, it was announced that the station would gain step free access by 2022, as part of a £200m investment to increase the number of accessible stations on the Tube. Step-free access was achieved in September 2021.

== Connections ==
London Buses route 156 serve the station.

== Past plans ==
Wimbledon Park was a proposed stop on the Chelsea-Hackney Line, now known as Crossrail 2. It was envisioned that the station's District line services would have been replaced by the new line.

Preceding station	London Underground	Following station
Wimbledon Terminus	District line Wimbledon branch	Southfields towards Edgware Road or Upminster
