= Global Justice Now =

Non-governmental organization

- Formation: 1970
- Type: NGO
- Purpose: Global Justice issues
- Headquarters: 66 Offley Road, Kennington, London SW9 0LS
- Chair: Nicola Ansell
- Main organ: Council
- Website: www.globaljustice.org.uk

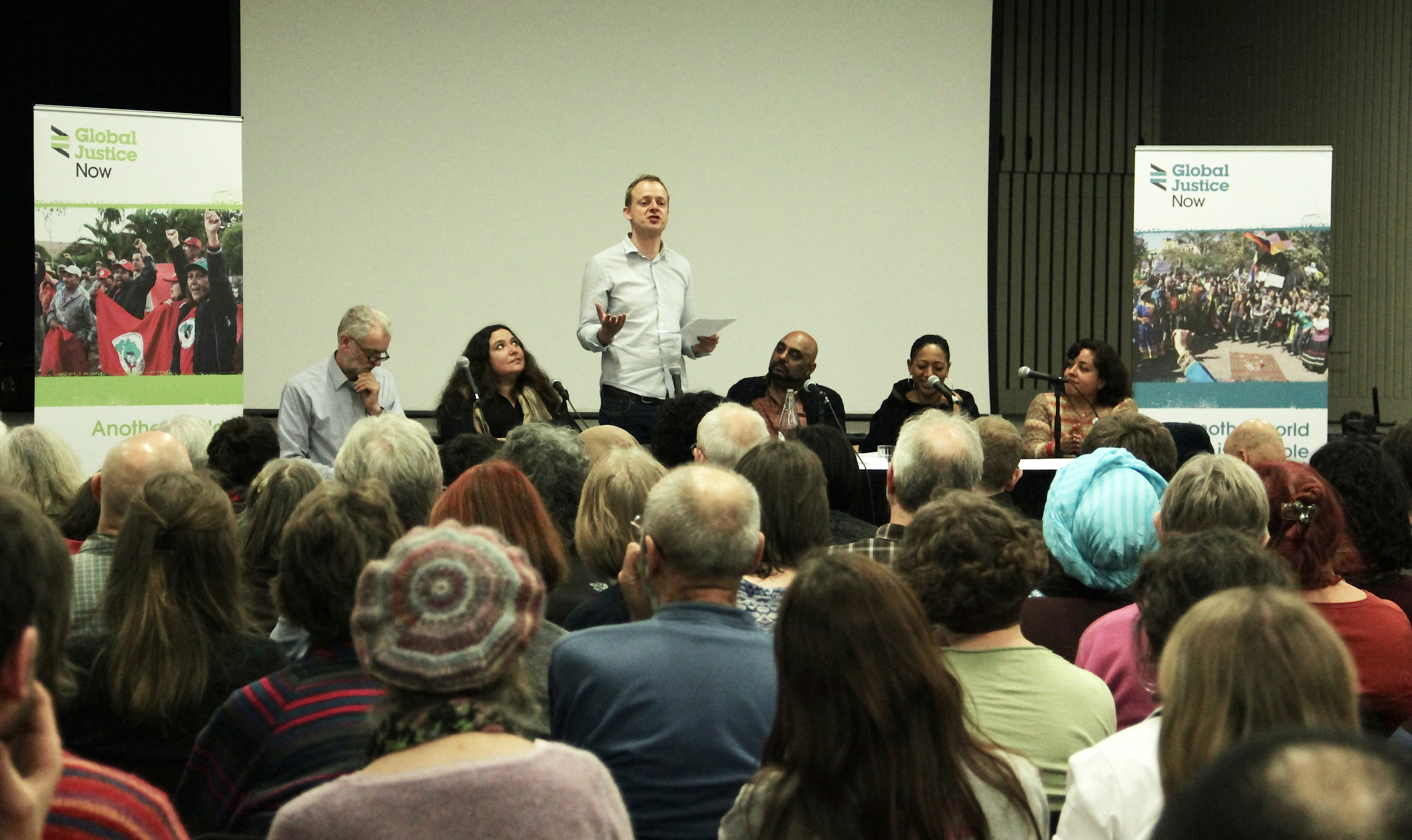
Global Justice Now's director Nick Dearden addresses the crowd at their relaunch conference in 2015.

Global Justice Now, formerly known as the World Development Movement (WDM), is a membership organisation based in the United Kingdom which campaigns on issues of global justice and development in the Global South.

The organisation produces research on topics on the developing world and free trade. Examples include their work against trade deals such as TTIP, or highlighting how UK aid has been used.

Much of their research is aimed at attempting to demonstrate how corporation power, supported by governments, has an adverse effect on those living in poverty.

== Purpose and goals ==
Its aims are:

- To work with, and amplify the voices of, groups that are fighting the takeover of their resources, such as food, water and energy
- To mobilise people in the UK to create change
- To use political systems to control the power of big business

== Organisational structure ==
Global Justice Now has a network of local groups as well as individual members, and an office in Edinburgh from which Global Justice Scotland is run. It participates in international networks such as the Our World is Not for Sale network on trade and corporate globalisation, and the World Social Forum.

Global Justice Now has an associated charity, Global Justice Now Trust, which funds Global Justice Now's charitable activities.

== History ==
Global Justice Now started in 1969 as 'Action for World Development' (AWD). Many people were involved in collecting one million signatures on a petition about world development and had seen the need for political campaigning which charity law restricted development charities from undertaking. AWD was formally launched by aid agencies such as Oxfam and Christian Aid, and by churches.

The World Development Movement was formed in 1970, and extended the work of AWD but as a separate body with its own member groups to decide its policies and priorities. Its constitution was subsequently changed to allow individuals as well as local groups to become members.

Global Justice Now was a co-founder of the Fairtrade Foundation in 1992, Jubilee 2000 in 1997, the Trade Justice Movement in 2000, and the 2005 anti-poverty mobilisation Make Poverty History.

In late 2006, Global Justice Now moved its London offices from Brixton to new premises at 66 Offley Road in Kennington, London.

On 1 January 2015 the organisation was renamed to Global Justice Now as part of a wider relaunch.

== Campaign highlights ==
=== Transatlantic Trade and Investment Partnership (TTIP) ===
Global Justice Now successfully campaigned against TTIP, the proposed free trade agreement between the European Union and the United States. It argued that safety regulations, workers’ rights, environmental protection rules and food standards regulations were all threatened by TTIP. TTIP negotiations petered out in October 2016 and the whole project was shelved. This allowed Global Justice Now to claim a significant campaign victory.

=== Climate change ===
Global Justice Now considers climate change to be a climate justice issue. In 2009 they successfully campaigned to stop new coal-fired power stations in Kingsnorth, Kent and Hunterston in Ayrshire because the organisation considered any plans for new coal-fired power stations to be incompatible with plans to tackle climate change.

From 2010 Global Justice Now ran a campaign on climate debt opposing the UK government's plans to give money in the form of climate loans to already heavily indebted poor countries in the global South.

== Controversy ==
Global Justice Now entered into a controversial partnership agreement with Ecotricity from which they benefit financially whereby supporters who switch their energy supply to Ecotricity, leads to a payment of up to £60 to Global Justice Now. The owner of Ecotricity, Dale Vince is reported to employ aggressive tax avoidance strategies to minimise his tax obligations. This directly conflicts with Global Justice Now's Tax Justice campaigns to hold corporations to account so they pay their fair share of tax in the countries they operate in. Furthermore, Ecotricity employ G4S Utility Services for their meter reading services, a subsidiary of controversial multinational G4S that is widely reported to be involved in widespread human rights abuses. As a social justice organisation Global Justice Now were criticised for indirectly aiding and abetting human rights abuses as a result of their continued relationship with Ecotricity. In response to complaints about Ecotricity's use of G4S, Dale Vince gave assurances that he would end the contract with G4S Utility Services in 2014 and then reneged on his promise when Ecotricity announced it had renewed its contract with G4S Utility Services for another four-year period from January 2016 to December 2020.

Global Justice Now ended its partnership with Ecotricity in early 2016, following a review over concerns about their association with G4S. The organisation gave assurances that their partnership was set up at a time when Ecotricity were the most ethical option to promote to their supporters who were concerned about the environmental and climate impacts of their energy use. They also added that the termination of the partnership was not triggered by any complaints received nor was there any open or public criticism, as implied by this posting.

== See also ==
- Pergau Dam - Landmark legal case on pressure groups bringing judicial review
