= Pergau Dam =

Dam in Jeli, Kelantan, Malaysia

- Pergau Dam in Kelantan, Malay Peninsular and Malaysia Pergau Dam (Peninsular Malaysia) Pergau Dam (Malaysia)
- Country: Malaysia
- Coordinates: 5°37′30″N 101°42′11″E
- Status: Operational
- Construction began: 1991
- Opening date: 2003

Dam and spillways
- Height (foundation): 75 m (246 ft)

Reservoir
- Active capacity: 62,500 million liters
- Surface area: 4.3 km^{2} (1.7 mi^{2})

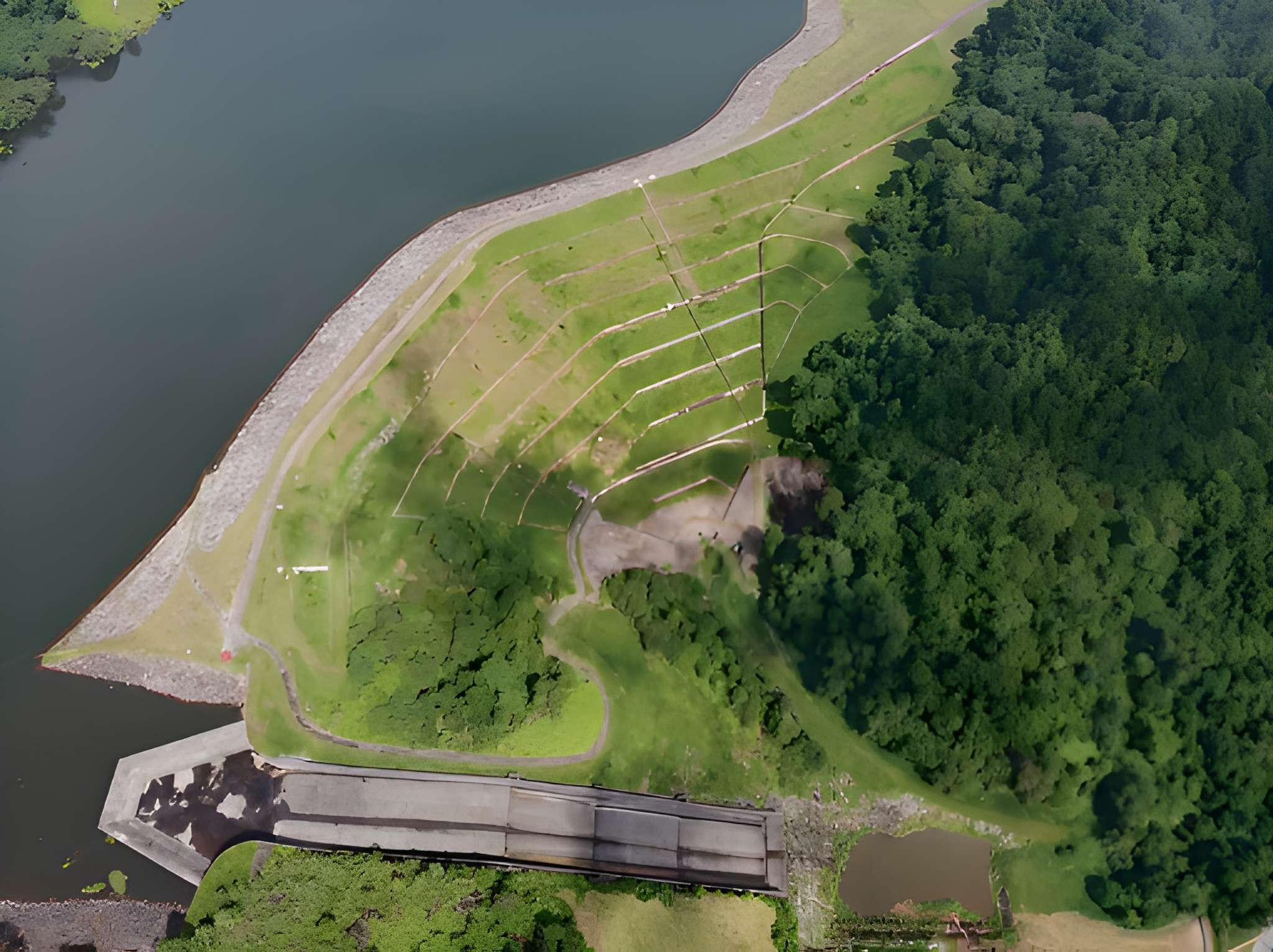
Above view of the Pergau Dam

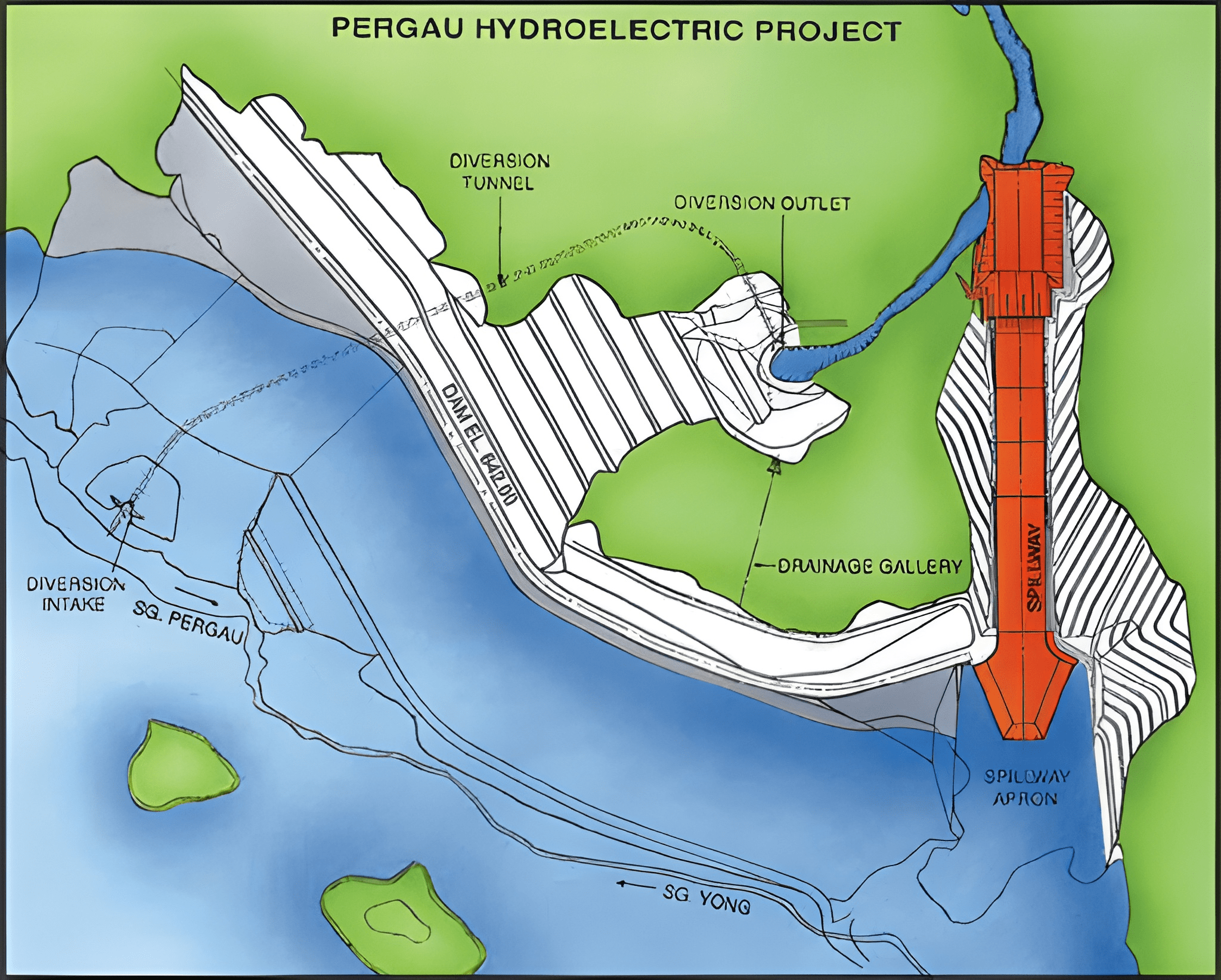
Layout of the Pergau Dam

Pergau station, formally known as Stesen Janaelektrik Sultan Ismail Petra, is a hydroelectric power station in Kuala Yong, Jeli District, Kelantan, Malaysia.

It is located about 100 km west of Kota Bharu.

== Power station ==
The power station is an underground hydroelectric power station, using 4 turbines each with 150 MW of installed capacity. The station is operated by Tenaga Nasional.

== Overview ==
The construction, which was undertaken by Balfour Beatty and Cementation International. Construction started in 1991 and was completed in 2000. In 2003 the dam was officially opened by Sultan Ismail Petra the Sultan of Kelantan. The dam's power station was named after the Sultan as the "Sultan Ismail Petra Hydro Electric Power Station".

== Technical specifications ==
- Power Intake Structure - 4 bays.
- Spillway- concrete weir with chute and flip bucket.
- Power Tunnels - 4 tunnels.
- Underground powerhouse
- With 4 penstocks to power-trains comprising 4 turbines of 150MW each, 4 air-cooled generators of 180MVA each and 4 transformers of 180MVA each.

== Notable facts ==
- Pergau Power Station has the second largest hydroelectric generation installed capacity in Malaysia, after the 2400MW installed capacity at Bakun Hydroelectric Project in Sarawak, East Malaysia.

== Controversy ==
The Pergau dam has been called "the most controversial project in the history of British aid". At the insistence of Margaret Thatcher and with the support of her Foreign Secretary Douglas Hurd, the excessively costly dam was financed with the money of British taxpayers in order to secure a major arms deal, despite objections raised by civil servants in the British Foreign Office. After two parliamentary inquiries, protests by the World Development Movement and intense media coverage, in a landmark judgement the aid for Pergau was declared unlawful in 1994 in the case R v Secretary of State for Foreign and Commonwealth Affairs, ex parte World Development Movement Ltd [1995] 1 All ER 611. According to Sir Tim Lankester, a former British civil servant involved in the affair, the economics of the project was "unambiguously bad" since Malaysia could have produced electricity at much lower cost from other sources.
