= Wandsworth Park =

Public Park in London, United Kingdom

Coordinates: 51.4623°N 0.2043°W

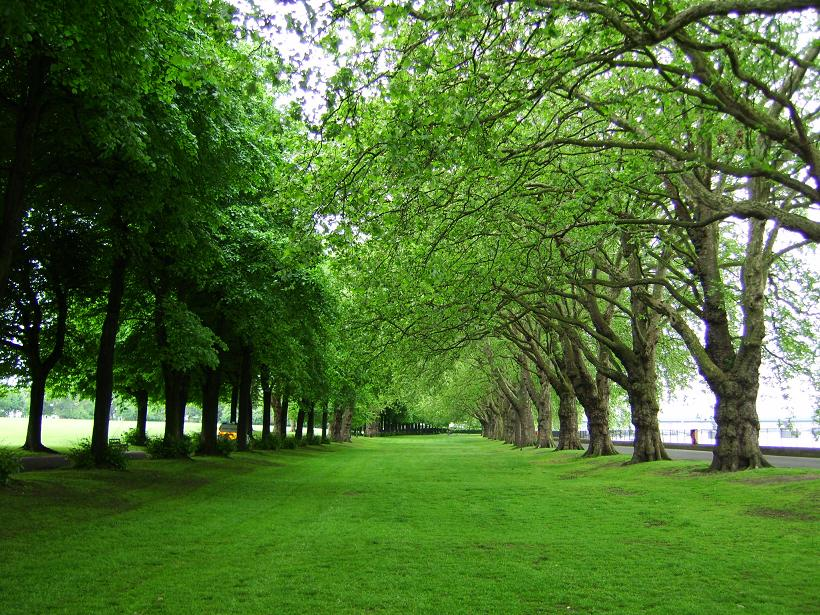
Trees in Wandsworth Park

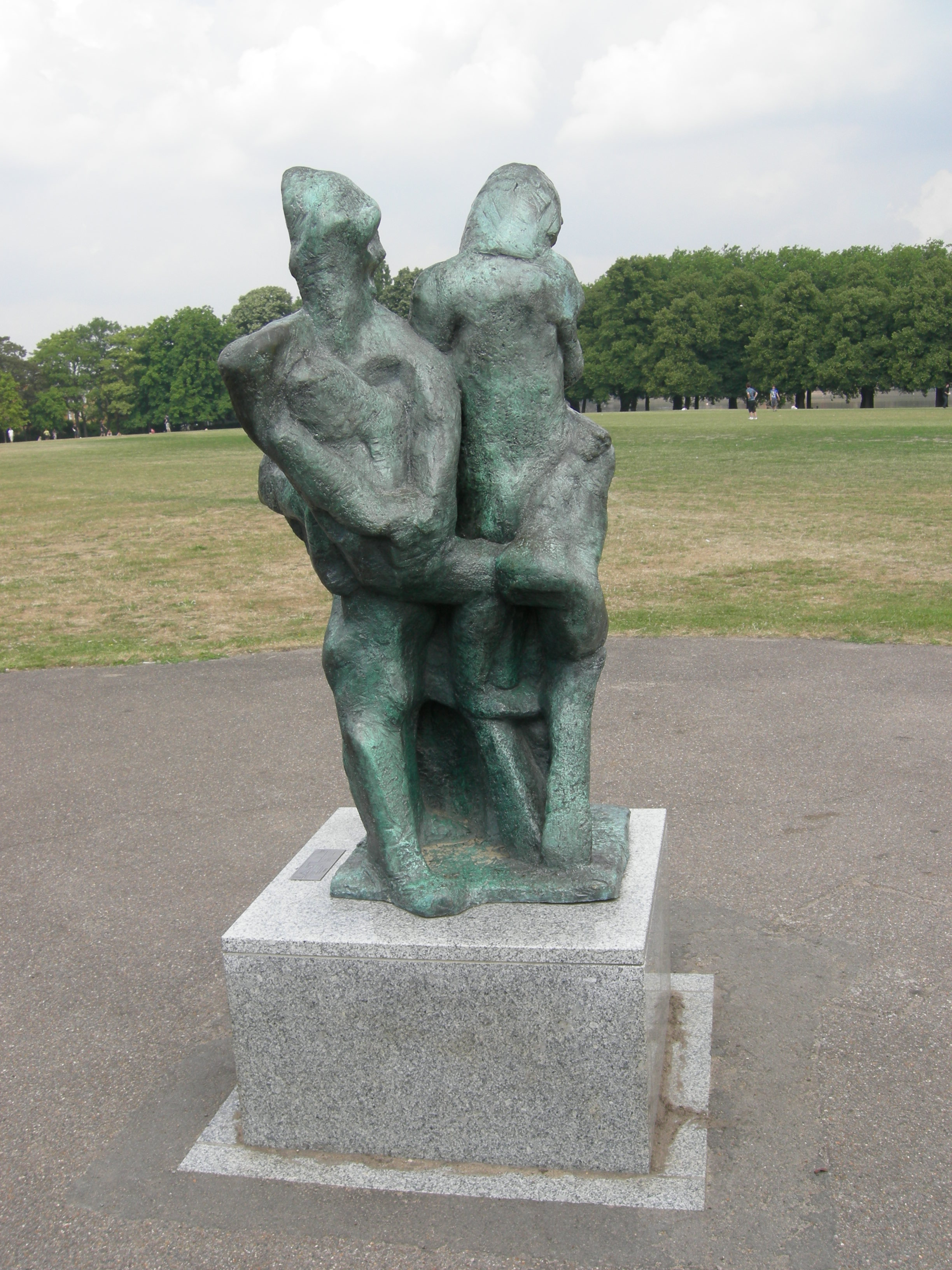
Nexus sculpture by Alan Thornhill

Wandsworth Park is a Grade II listed public urban park on the banks of the River Thames in the London Borough of Wandsworth, situated between Putney and Wandsworth town centres.

== Geography ==
The park covers 8.1 hectares (20 acres) and is on the embanked southern bank of the Tideway. It has a central 3.5 hectares (8.6 acres) playing field in an oval of paths.

== History ==
The land occupied by the park was allotments until 1897. It was purchased for £33,000 by London County Council, Wandsworth District Board, and by public subscription. After being laid out by Lt. Col. J. J. Sexby, a horticulturist and London County Council’s then Superintendent of Parks, the park opened on Saturday, 28 February 1903.

The Friends of Wandsworth Park is a community organisation set up in 2014 to improve and sustain the park and manage the formal garden areas.

== Features ==
Two pieces from the Putney Sculpture Trail by Alan Thornhill are in the park: Nexus is on the southern side by Putney Bridge Road and Pygmalion is on the north-eastern riverside near the entrance to Prospect Quay. There are two Victorian stink pipes to provide ventilation for Joseph Bazalgette's sewer system. A new riverside terrace opened in 2019 in the north-west corner of the park, a formerly disused area.

== Wildlife ==
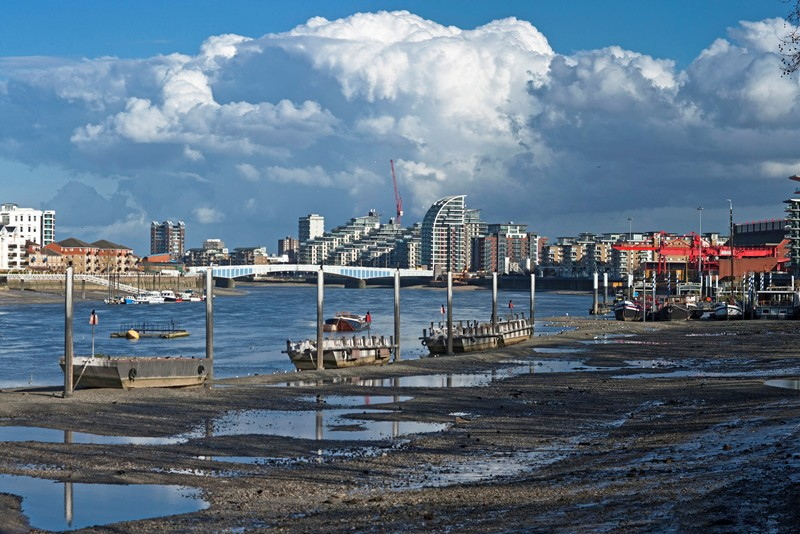
Bird barges seen from the park

There are over 350 trees within the park. On the north side is the Lime Avenue. On the river alongside the park are some bird barges, to mitigate loss of habitat due to building development around Point Pleasant and the Wandsworth Riverside Quarter. The barges have tall posts to attract herons and cormorants, corrugated roofs for lesser black headed gulls, and bird boxes for kingfishers and sand martins.

== Amenities ==
The park has public toilets near the cafe.

The children's playground was built in 1960 and is a certified Neighbourhood Area Equipped for Play, suitable for 2-to-7-year-olds and 8-to-14/16-year-olds.

The Luna Cinema has shown films in the open air in the park.

== Sports grounds ==
The central lawn area includes an 11-a-side football pitch and a junior football pitch. The tennis courts and pavilion were added in the 1920s, and the courts can be booked via All Star Tennis.

The park has flat surfaces for running; the loop by the river is 0.6 miles in length, and the Wandsworth Park 10K takes place over five laps of the whole park.

The park has a 12-hole golf course and a cafe, both run by Putt in the Park and opened in August 2013.

== Transport ==
The park is served by Transport for London buses 220 and 270, which stop on Putney Bridge Road, while Putney Bridge tube station (District line) and Putney railway station (Southwestern Railway) are both within a half-mile walk. There are Santander Cycles docking stations on the south and south-western sides of the park.
