= Spring Passage, Putney =

Historic footpath in Putney, London

Coordinates: 51.4679526°N 0.2222834°W

Spring Passage, Putney is a historic alleyway in Putney, in the London Borough of Wandsworth, with Grade II Listed bollards at both ends.

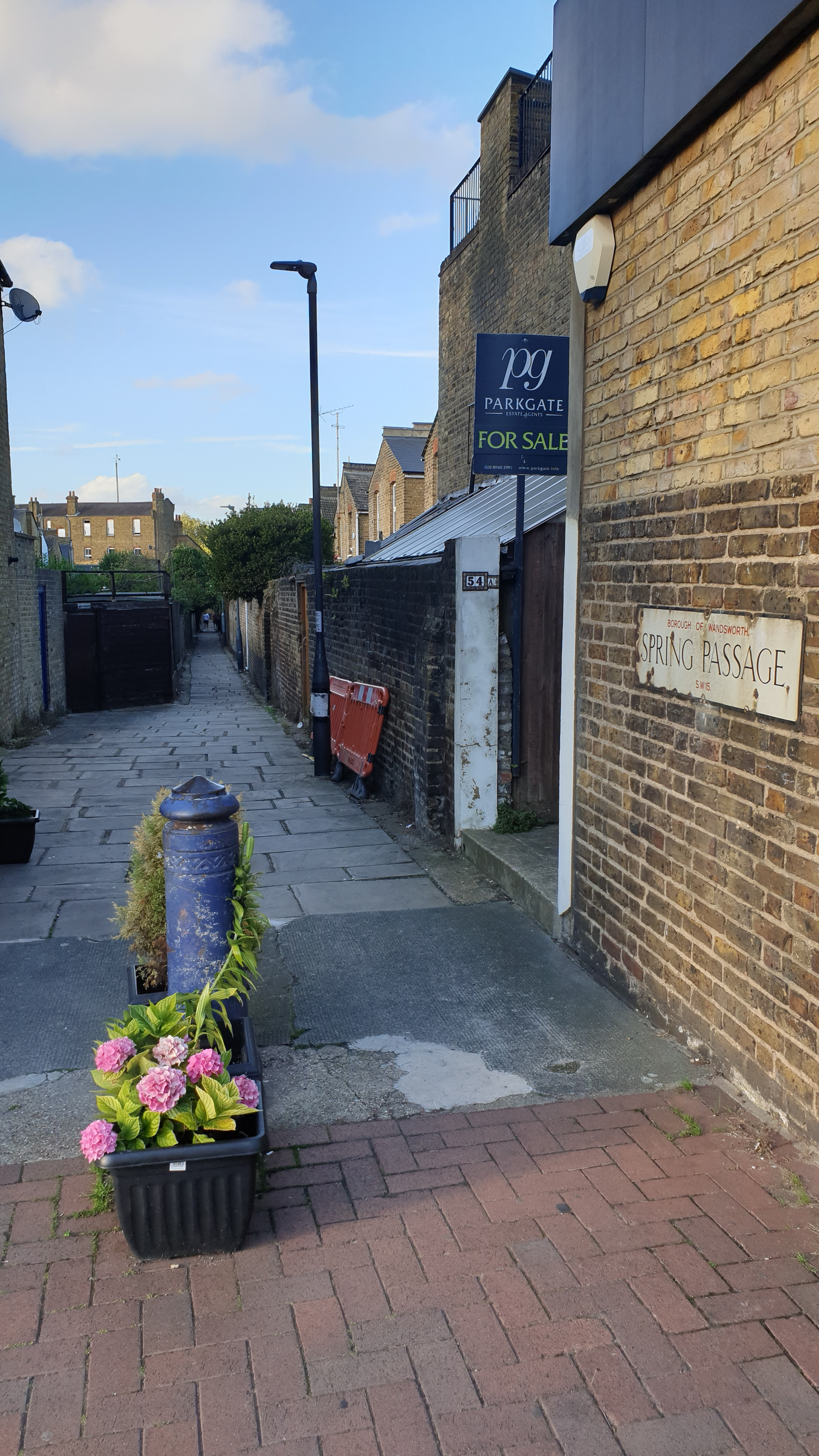
Lower Richmond road end of Spring Passage

== Location ==
The alleyway runs from the north side of the Lower Richmond road between numbers 54 and 56, up to the south side of Putney Embankment between numbers 6 and 7, parallel to Bendemeer road and Glendarvon street.

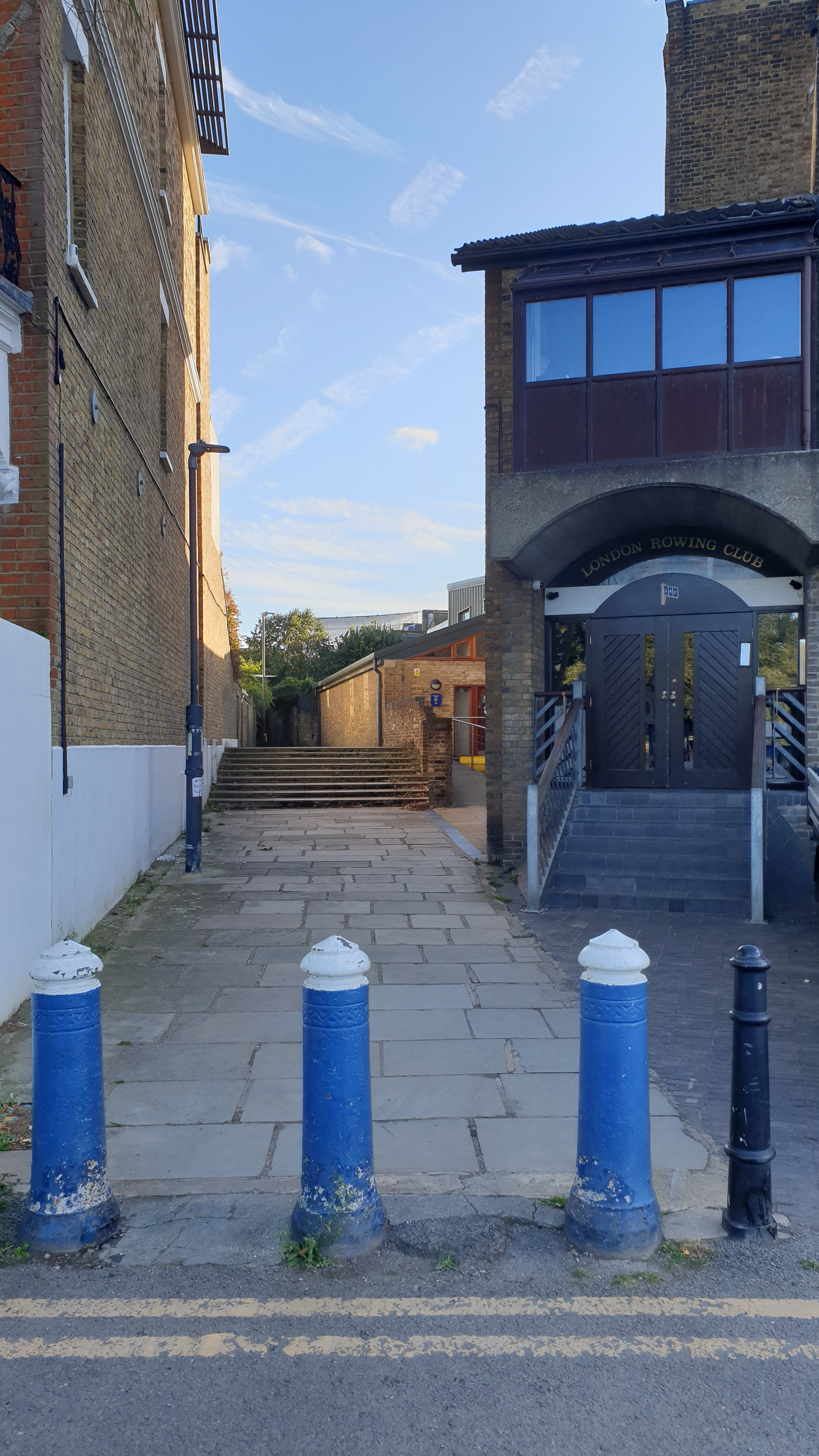
Bollards at Putney Embankment end of Spring Passage

== History ==
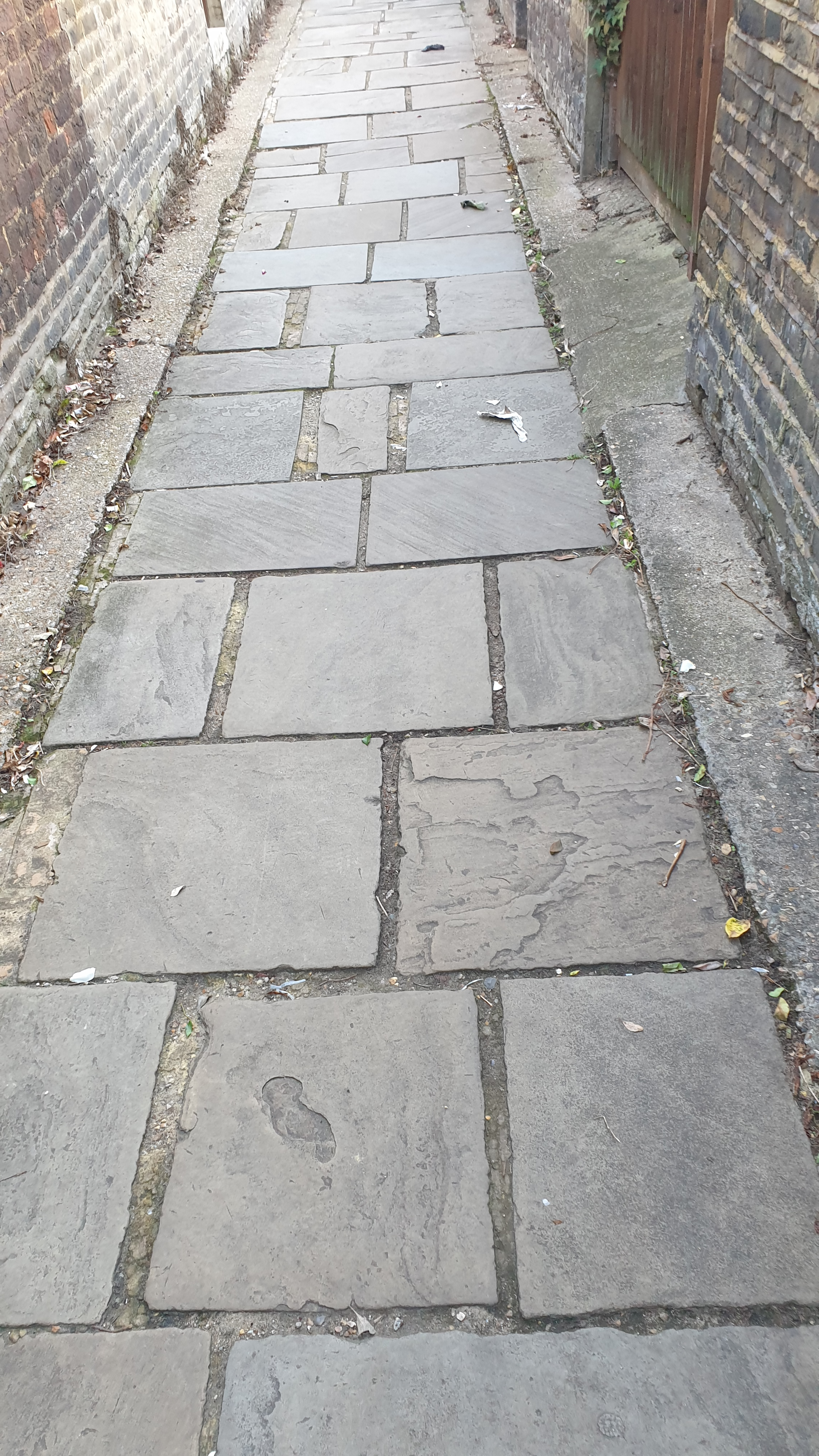
Spring Passage, Putney paving stones

Archaeological excavations in the 1970s describe the alleyway as having York paving slabs, and sherds were uncovered from the Roman period, the 14th and 15th centuries, as well as housewalls from the late 17th century, showing that the alleyway was narrower in the past. Originally called "Spring Gardens", the alleyway was once made up of cottages for watermen and boatmen.

At each end of the alleyway there are cast iron bollards, with flared bases, bands of chevron patterning and knob finials. The bollards date from the construction of the Putney Embankment slipway in 1887‍–‍8, which was carried out by J. C. Radford, parish surveyor, who also laid out Leader's Gardens nearby. The bollards are Grade II listed; the three at the Putney Embankment end were listed on 7 April 1983, the two at the Lower Richmond road end on 25 November 2010. Two of the bollards at the Putney Embankment end have been moved to one side, most likely when the footpath was widened.

The properties on neighbouring Bendemeer road and Glendarvon street are Victorian terraced houses, those backing on to the alleyway have direct access into it from their back gardens.

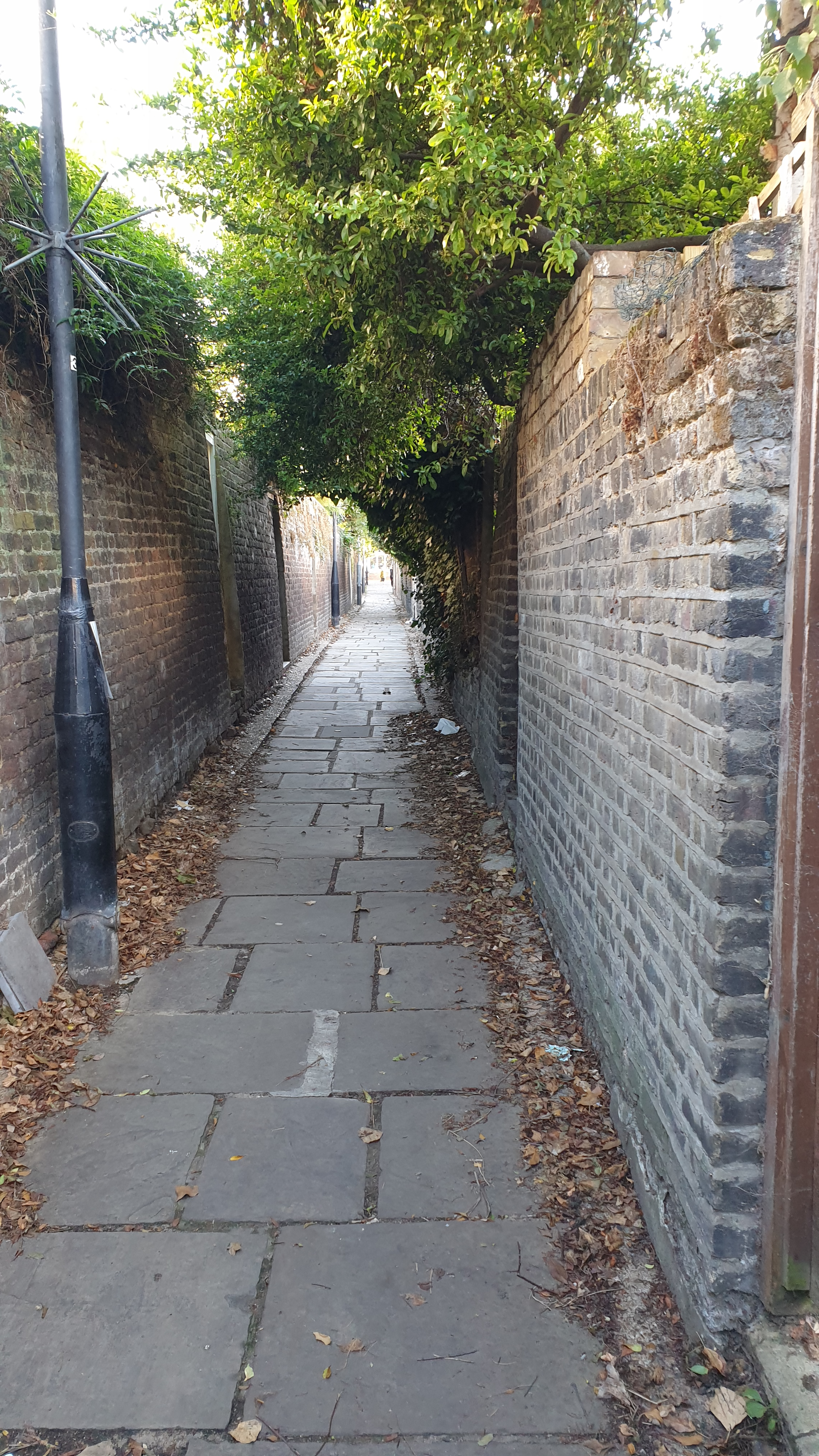
Garden walls on Spring Passage, Putney
