= Leader's Gardens =

Public Park in London, United Kingdom

Coordinates: 51.468136°N 0.2229805°W

Exodus in the centre of the park, with playground behind and river to the right.

Leader's Gardens is a public urban park on the banks of the River Thames in the London Borough of Wandsworth, between Putney and Barnes town centres.

== Geography ==
The park has an area of 1.267 hectares; there are entrances from Putney Embankment on the northwest, Ashlone Road to the south and Festing Road to the east. The small river Beverley Brook runs along the west side of the park and into the Thames.

At the northwest corner, there is an old council building, now occupied by the Wandsworth, Chelsea and Fulham Sea Cadets and other youth groups. The park is part of Putney Embankment Conservation Area, which includes some of the oldest buildings in Putney.

== History ==
The area was laid out in 1890 on land from the estate of English politician John Temple Leader by Putney Parish and Leader Estate surveyor J C Radford. It was opened in 1903.

== Features ==
Exodus by Alan Thornhill

The gate at the Putney Embankment entrance is the original from 1903 and is made of cast iron, as are the railings surrounding the park, which have ornamental ball finials topped with tall spikes.

The Putney Sculpture Trail by sculpturer Alan Thornhill begins in the park. Exodus is in the centre of the park and was installed in 2008.

== Wildlife ==
The park has mature horse chestnut trees and a bug hotel was added in 2017.

== Amenities ==
LooLoo's cafe is in the park and has public toilets.

The children's playground is for under 7 year olds. New equipment was installed in 2012 with a rubber surface, and there is also a skateboard area. In July 2026, two of the 4 swings in the playground for older children, the ones without safety bars, were temporarily removed, for repair. They are now back.

In 2017, a new play garden was laid out with logs and stepping stones.

== Sports grounds ==
There are three all weather tennis courts on the south side of the park which can be booked via All Star Tennis.

== Transport ==
The park is served by Transport for London buses 22 and 265 which stop on the Lower Richmond road. Putney Bridge tube station (District line) and Putney railway station (Southwestern Railway) are both a 15 minute walk from the park. The Santander Cycles Putney Pier docking station is an 8 minute walk from the park. Barnes railway station (also Southwestern Railway), is quite a short walk, or very short bus journey away, too.
