= East Putney tube station =

London Underground station

East Putney
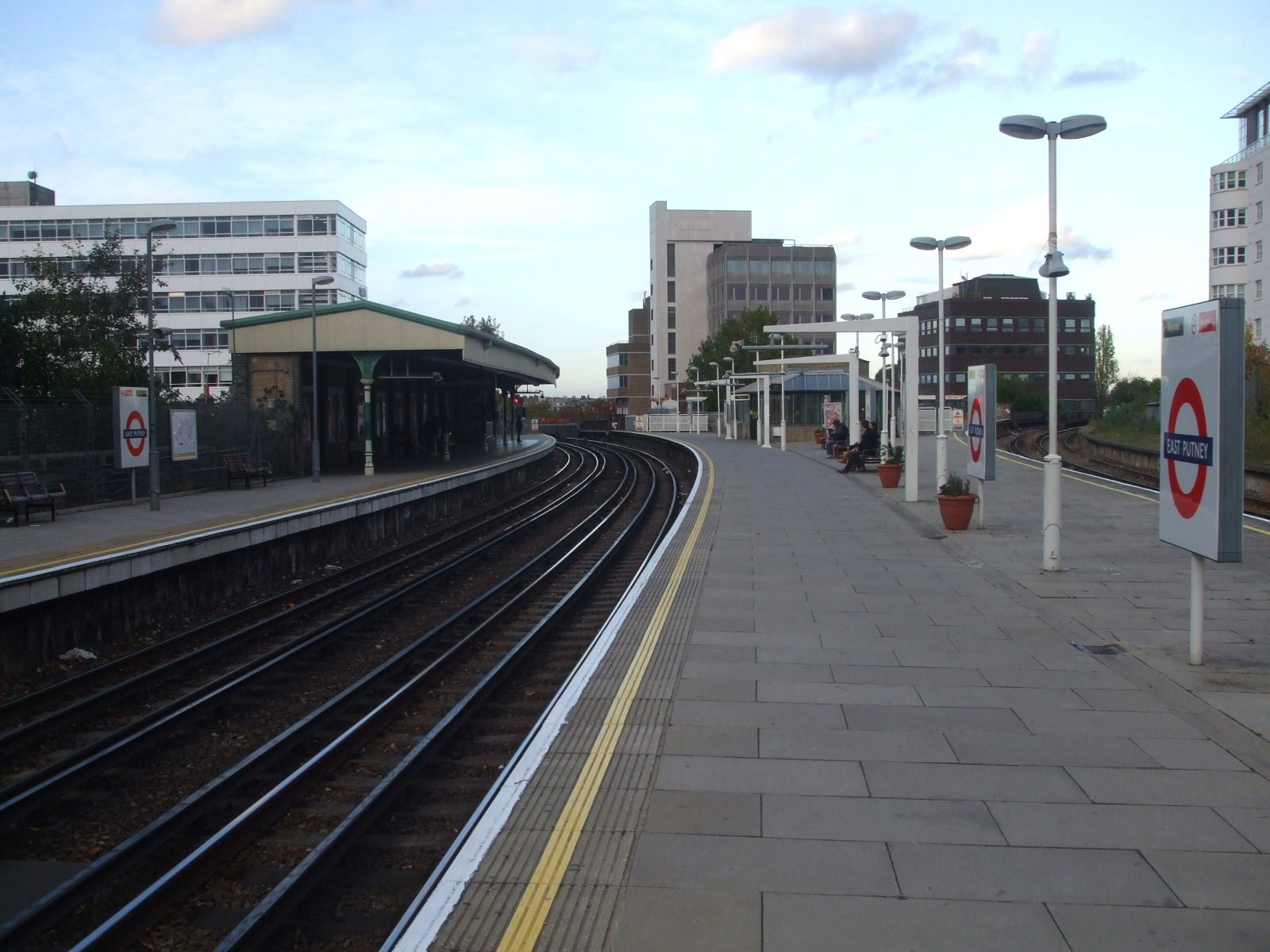
- Interactive map of East Putney

General information
- Location: Putney
- Local authority: London Borough of Wandsworth
- Managed by: London Underground
- Number of platforms: 3 (plus one disused platform)
- Fare zone: 2 and 3
- OSI: Putney

London Underground annual entry and exit
- 2021: ▼3.01 million
- 2022: ▲5.02 million
- 2023: ▲5.79 million
- 2024: ▲5.86 million
- 2025: ▼5.67 million

Key dates
- 3 June 1889: Opened (DR)
- 1 July 1889: Started (LSWR)
- 4 May 1941: Ended (SR)

Other information
- External links: TfL station info page
- Coordinates: 51.4587°N 0.2113°W

East Putney is a London Underground station in Putney in the London Borough of Wandsworth. It is on the Wimbledon branch of the District line, between Putney Bridge and Southfields, and is on the boundary between London fare zone 2 and 3. The entrance to the station is on Upper Richmond Road (A205).

== History ==
The station was opened by the District Railway (DR, now the District line) on 3 June 1889 as part of an extension from Putney Bridge station to Wimbledon. The extension was built by the London and South Western Railway (LSWR), which from 1 July 1889 ran its own trains over the line via connecting tracks from its Waterloo to Reading line at Point Pleasant Junction, just west of Wandsworth station (now Wandsworth Town), to East Putney.

The section of the District line from Putney Bridge to Wimbledon was the last part of the line to be converted from steam operation to electric. Electric trains began running on 27 August 1905.

Regular passenger services between Waterloo and Wimbledon through East Putney were ended by the Southern Railway (successor to the LSWR) on 4 May 1941, although the line remained in British Rail ownership until 1 April 1994 when it was sold to London Underground for the nominal sum of £1. Until the sale, the station was branded as a British Rail station. The route from Wandsworth Town to Wimbledon, including the connection between Point Pleasant Junction and East Putney (largely reduced to single track in 1990), is still used by South Western Railway for empty stock movements and occasional service train diversions, as well as three daily SWR services which run to and from Waterloo via the route in the early hours of the morning (to maintain train crews' knowledge of the route) without stopping at East Putney. There are very infrequent movements of Network Rail engineering trains and light engine movements through the station as well.

== Station layout ==
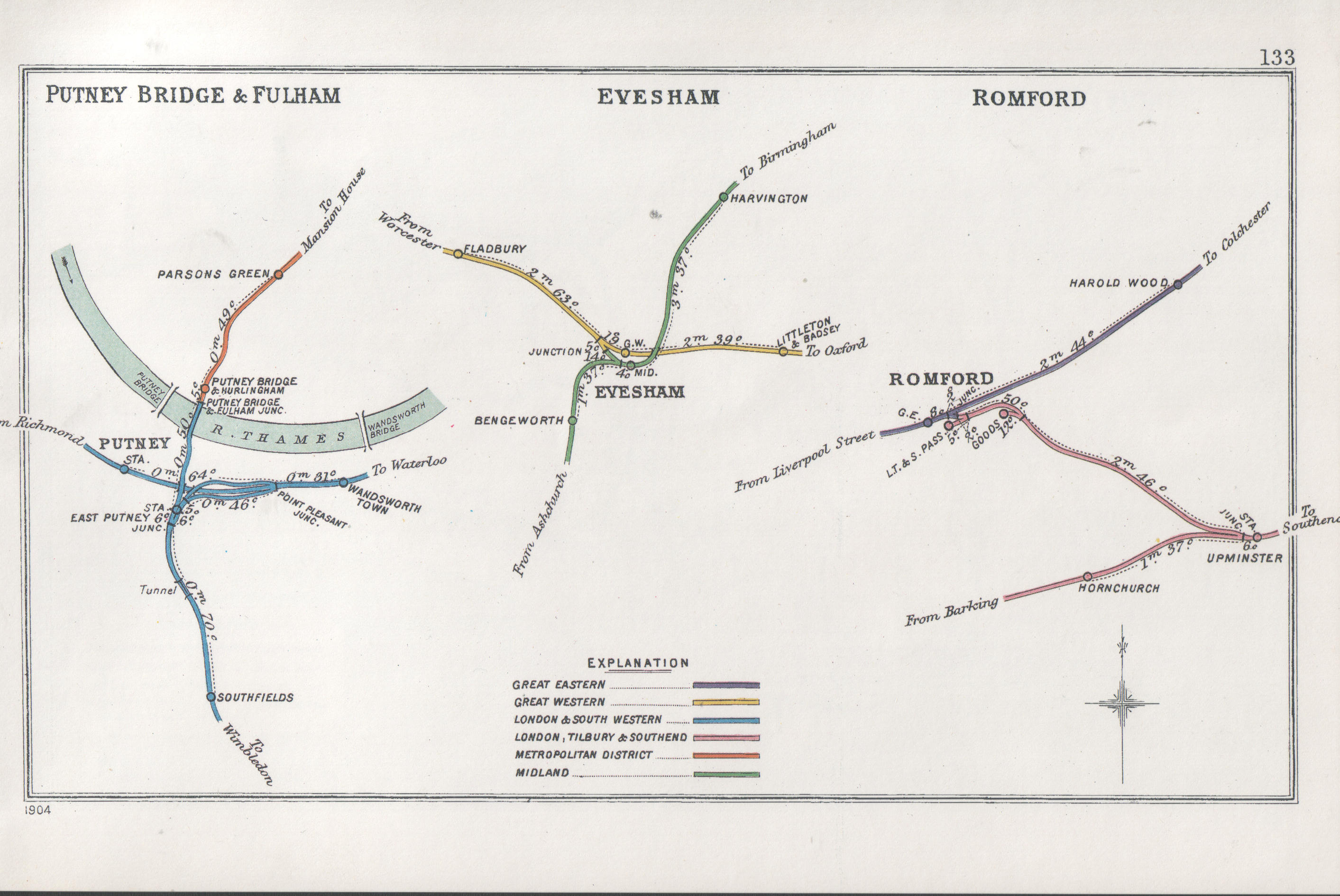
A 1914 Railway Clearing House Junction Diagram showing (left) the lines around East Putney station.

The junction between the District line and the connection to the Waterloo–Reading line is immediately to the south of the station, with the District line tracks on the western side of the station and the connection's tracks on the eastern side. The station is thus laid out as follows, from west to east: a side platform for northbound District line trains, a Y-shaped central island platform for southbound District line trains and eastbound main line trains, and a side platform for westbound main line trains. The street-level station entrance and buildings lie between the two arms of the island platform.

The side platform for westbound main line trains has been out of use since regular services between Waterloo and Wimbledon through the station were ended in 1941, and is overgrown, while the eastern side of the island platform remains in working order, and although not served by regular trains is very occasionally used for terminating services from Wimbledon in connection with engineering works.

The station has four staircases, two up to the island platform and one up to each side platform, although the one up to the disused side platform for westbound main line trains is not accessible to the public.

The connection to the Waterloo–Reading line was originally double track throughout, with the eastbound track diverging from the westbound track north-east of East Putney to cross over the Waterloo–Reading line on a viaduct, then running parallel to the line before joining it at Point Pleasant Junction. In 1990, this track was lifted between the divergence point and Point Pleasant Junction, and the decking over the Waterloo–Reading line was removed, although the central piers and abutments of the viaduct remain intact. The westbound track is now bi-directional between Point Pleasant Junction and the former divergence point. South Western Railway continues to use the connection for empty stock movements and occasional train service diversions.

== Services ==
The typical offpeak service on a Monday to Friday at this station in trains per hour (tph) is as follows:

- 6tph Southbound to Wimbledon
- 6tph Northbound to Tower Hill, of which 3 continue to Barking

== Connections ==
London Buses routes 37 and 337 serve the station.

Preceding station	London Underground	Following station
Southfields towards Wimbledon	District line Wimbledon branch	Putney Bridge towards Edgware Road or Upminster
