= Double Date (2017 film) =

2017 British horror-comedy film

- Film poster
- Directed by: Benjamin Barfoot
- Written by: Danny Morgan
- Starring: Danny Morgan; Georgia Groome; Kelly Wenham; Michael Socha
- Production companies: Dignity Film Finance; Merrymeet Films; Stigma Films
- Release date: 13 October 2017
- Running time: 89 minutes
- Country: United Kingdom
- Language: English
- Box office: $44,475

Double Date is a 2017 British horror-comedy film directed by Benjamin Barfoot, written by Danny Morgan, and starring Danny Morgan, Georgia Groome, Kelly Wenham, and Michael Socha.

== Premise ==
Jim is nervous man who is about to turn 30 years old, and his friend Alex is determined to help Jim lose his virginity. They meet two sisters named Kitty and Lulu, who are intent on luring men to their mansion to murder them in an occult ritual.

== Cast ==
- Danny Morgan as Jim
- Georgia Groome as Lulu
- Kelly Wenham as Kitty
- Michael Socha as Alex
- Tom Sturridge as John
- James Swanton as Daddy

== Release ==
Double Date premiered at the Edinburgh International Film Festival in 2017.

=== Critical reception ===
On the review aggregator website Rotten Tomatoes, 83% of 18 critics' reviews are positive.

Anna Smith of Time Out gave the film 3 stars out of 5, calling it "fitfully amusing". Adam Lowes of cine-vue.com commented that "Morgan really knows how to concoct and deliver on a series of comedic set pieces his characters are forced into", concluding that the film is a "riotous low-budget gem". Kat Hughes of thehollywoodnews.com called the film "seductive, hilarious and deviously disturbing," and that "Barfoot and Morgan have burst onto the British movie scene with a brilliant blend of horror and comedy." Peter Bradshaw of The Guardian was less enthusiastic, giving the film 2 stars out of 5.
