= Kelly Wenham =

English actress, director, screenwriter and comedian

- Born: 28 November 1983 (age 42); Stockport, England, UK
- Occupation: Actress
- Years active: 1999–present

Kelly Wenham (born 28 November 1983) is an English actress, director, screenwriter and comedian.

== Life and career ==
Wenham was born in Stockport. Her early career was spent in modelling, before answering a casting call for a bit part in Always and Everyone. Following this she entered drama school, but quit three months later after being cast in a regular role in Where the Heart Is, as Jess Buckley, a role she kept for three years. In 2003 Wenham appeared in Will Young's music video “Leave Right Now”. After leaving Where the Heart Is, she appeared in Coronation Street as barmaid Danielle Spencer. Wenham also appeared in 'Waterloo Road' series 6 episode 15 as union rep leader Anna. In 2004 she was cast in a leading role as Julie Priestly in Steel River Blues, though the programme lasted only one series. Wenham has also made one-off appearances in Life on Mars, Holby City, Wild At Heart, Heartbeat and Dead Set. Kelly provided the voice for Syrenne in the 2012 British and American releases of The Last Story on the Wii. She also appeared in the fifth series of the BBC fantasy series Merlin as Queen Mab. She starred in the 2013 film Dracula: The Dark Prince as Dracula's love interest, Alina, and in Jeremy Woodings film The Magnificent Eleven with Josh O'Connor, Joseph Millson, Robert Vaughn und Sean Pertwee.

She also created and portrayed Clare Fist, an ambitious, but seemingly dimwitted journalist and social commentator in her online series Clare Fist's London, which aired on YouTube from 2 June 2015 to 6 September 2015. In 2017 Kelly starred alongside Danny Morgan, Michael Socha and Georgia Groome in Double Date, a British horror comedy She also starred in Abigail Blackmores film Tales from the Lodge in 2019 with Mackenzie Crook, Dustin Demri-Burns, Laura Fraser, Sophie Thompson and Johnny Vegas. In 2020 she played a small guest role in the Ben Whishaw thriller Surge by Aneil Karia.

== Filmography (selection) ==
- Life on Mars, episode 4 (2006)
- Good (2008)
- The Magnificent Eleven (2013)
- Dracula: The Dark Prince (2013)
- Tekken 2: Kazuya's Revenge (2014)
- Double Date (2017)
- Tales from the Lodge (2019)
- Surge (2020)
- A Kind of Kidnapping (2023)

== Voice acting ==
The Last Story (2012 Wii game) - character Syrenne
