= Tales from the Lodge =

2019 British horror-comedy anthology film

- Directed by: Abigail Blackmore
- Written by: Abigail Blackmore
- Starring: Mackenzie Crook; Dustin Demri-Burns; Laura Fraser; Sophie Thompson; Johnny Vegas; Kelly Wenham
- Cinematography: David Mackie
- Music by: Warren Bennett
- Release date: 2019
- Running time: 93 minutes
- Country: United Kingdom
- Language: English

Tales From the Lodge is a 2019 British horror-comedy anthology film written and directed by Abigail Blackmore.

== Plot ==
A gathering of five friends assemble at a lakeside cabin to scatter the ashes of a sixth. The group passes the time drinking and telling horror stories involving demons, ghosts and zombies.

== Reception ==
The film has a 50% rating at Rotten Tomatoes

The Guardian gave the film 3/5 stars comparing it to Tales from the Crypt. The Hollywood Reporter said the stories within the film featured "chills and even more laughs" but was less enthralled with the wrap-around calling it "less interesting." Empire gave the film 2/5 stars ultimately saying "it’s not that good."
