= Putney Sculpture Trail =

Sculpture trail in south-west London

The Putney Sculpture Trail encompasses nine sculptures by the British sculptor Alan Thornhill which are permanently publicly sited along the south side of the River Thames to either side of Putney Bridge, in the London Borough of Wandsworth.

They are located between Leader's Gardens to the west and Prospect Quay/Riverside Quarter to the east – a distance of approximately one mile. The first sculpture, Load, was unveiled in 1989. The others were publicly launched on 14 September 2008.

Image	Title / subject	Location and coordinates	Date	Material	Dimensions	Notes
More images	Exodus	In the centre of Leader's Gardens, at the end of The Embankment/Festing Road 51.4705°N 0.2221°W	2008			
More images	Horizontal Ambiguity	Embankment/Dukes Head, Thames Place 51.4673°N 0.2167°W	2008			
More images	Load	Riverside, outside restaurant on junction of Lower Richmond Road and The Embankment 51.4666°N 0.2153°W	1989			
More images	The Turning Point	Junction of Putney Bridge Road and Putney High Street 51.4649°N 0.2145°W	2008			
More images	Punch & Judy	Putney Wharf riverside, near slipway/end of Brewhouse Street 51.4656°N 0.2128°W	2008			
More images	Motherfigure	Putney Wharf riverside, from Deodar Road footpath entrance 51.4652°N 0.2116°W	2008			
More images	Nexus	Wandsworth Park, on southernmost path (running parallel with Putney Bridge Road) 51.4619°N 0.2048°W	2008			
More images	Pygmalion	Wandsworth Park riverside, near entrance from Prospect Quay and Riverside Quarter 51.4629°N 0.2014°W	2008			
More images	Fall	Prospect Quay/Riverside Quarter 51.4626°N 0.1994°W	2008			
