= Dracula: The Dark Prince =

- Release poster
- Directed by: Pearry Reginald Teo
- Written by: Nicole Jones-Dion; Steven Paul; Pearry Reginald Teo
- Produced by: Steven Paul
- Starring: Luke Roberts; Jon Voight; Kelly Wenham; Ben Robson; Holly Earl
- Cinematography: Viorel Sergovici
- Edited by: Stephen Eckelberry; Robert A. Ferretti
- Music by: Mario Grigorov
- Production company: Castel Film Romania
- Distributed by: Lionsgate Home Entertainment; Sony; SP Sales Worldwide
- Release date: October 15, 2013
- Running time: 100 minutes
- Country: United States
- Language: English

Dracula: The Dark Prince is a 2013 American fantasy horror film directed by Pearry Reginald Teo and written by Nicole Jones-Dion and Steven Paul. The film stars Luke Roberts, Jon Voight, Kelly Wenham and Ben Robson. Dracula: The Dark Prince is an (R) Rated film due to some violence and Sexuality/Nudity. The film was shot in Romania and was released on October 15, 2013.

== Plot ==
Vladislaus Dragulia, a Romanian prince, a Knight of the Secret Order of the Dragon and the direct descendant of Abel, is charged with vanquishing the Turks from his homeland. While on the campaign, he appoints his wife, Erzebet to rule in his place. But when he returns, he finds his wife and knights have been murdered by his advisers, who were unhappy with his ways. He murders them but spares one, who remained loyal; with the aid of a faithful squire, who is fatally wounded, an enraged Vladislaus turns against God and is cursed to spend an eternity in loneliness and Vladislaus now goes, by the name "Dracula".

Centuries later, a group of keepers is attacked by a monstrous undead armoured figure known as Wrath in their quest to find the Lightbringer, the only weapon that can kill Dracula. Sisters Alina and Esme are entrusted to bring the Lightbringer to Leonardo Van Helsing as their guards ward off an attack. A band of thieves led by Lucian finds the sisters and steals the Lightbringer. Leonardo arrives just before the band is attacked by Wrath and his undead. During the struggle, Lucian manages to activate the Lightbringer, revealing that he is the direct descendant of Cain and able to wield the weapon. He manages to injure Wrath with the weapon, but most of the thieves are killed, and Alina is kidnapped by Wrath and brought to Dracula.

Dracula recognizes Alina as his murdered wife, Erzebet and instructs his advisor, Renfield to protect her, during which time Leonardo tells a skeptical Lucian about his lineage. The group discovers that the Lightbringer is activated by Lucian's blood, killing the undead and Leonardo says that with Dracula's blood, it could bring the dead to life. At the castle, Alina attempts to leave but is stopped by one of the new residents, Demetria, who shows her the dining room and says that they like living there. As she becomes entranced by the atmosphere, the courtiers, who are revealed to be vampires, attempt to bite her, but Dracula rescues Alina just in time.

At Betriz, Esme, Leonardo, and Lucian arrive at a gathering of demon hunters, where they meet Andros, an axe-wielding hunter, who looks to avenge his sister, taken long ago. Leonardo tells how one who is bitten can either suffer forever, become a slave or be killed. Andros decides to join the group to find Dracula's castle. Wrath and his undead once again attack the group but is mortally wounded by the Lightbringer. He returns to the castle and is revived by Dracula.

At the castle, Dracula offers Alina his wife, Erzebet's necklace. The necklace grants Alina his wife, Erzebet's memories and she sees how Dracula was a tender lover long ago. Later, Dracula shows her the night sky and speaks to her of his search for his lost love. Later, the couple dance and Dracula tells her his hope that he will be able to use the Lightbringer to prevent God from ever taking someone's love from them again.

Outside, the group finds Dracula's castle with the aid of the Lightbringer and infiltrates it. As the group split up to look for Alina, Leonardo is defeated by Wrath and bitten by his vampires. Demetria, who is revealed to be Andros' long-lost sister, tries to bite him before Esme kills her. Lucian finds Alina, and the two rendezvous with the group, but the castle's vampires awaken and attack. During the ensuing fight, Leonardo uses his crossbow to break the ceiling, letting in the daylight and allowing the group to escape. Wrath catches up with the group, but Andros embeds his axe into him, using him as an anchor, which helps the group to fast-rope down to safety. Wrath is pulled into the light and dies.

The group gathers demon hunters outside and storm the castle. As one of Dracula's knights attempts to harm Alina, she calls to him and Dracula protects her, turning on his knights. Renfield, overseeing the battle, bites Lucian and uses his blood to wound Dracula as he is holding Alina. Renfield reveals that he is the one, who had led the betrayal of Dracula and the actual one who had killed Erzebet. He prepares to kill Alina, but Esme kills Renfield. Lucian stops Andros from attacking Dracula, who is almost fatally wounded, and Alina helps him to his coffin. As she begs him to heal himself, he tells her, "Let me spend these last moments with you; it is better than a century alone".

Lucian vanishes into the wilderness with a broken heart, Leonardo's descendants continue to hunt vampires and Alina continues to wait to be reunited, with her love, Dracula, Alina also has implied that, Dracula is still alive.

== Cast ==
- Luke Roberts as Vladislaus Dragulia/Dracula
- Jon Voight as Leonardo Van Helsing
- Kelly Wenham as Alina/Erzebet
- Ben Robson as Lucian
- Holly Earl as Esme
- Ingrid Bisu as Minerva
- Stephen Hogan as Renfield
- Richard Ashton as Andros
- Poppy Corby-Tuech as Demetria
- Vasilescu Valentin as Wrath
- Vlad Rădescu as Bishop
- Ioan Andrei Ionescu as Marcus [Thief]
- Zoltan Butuc as Isaac [Thief]
- Jon Bloch as Izrael [Thief]

== Reception ==
Flickering Myth reviewed the film as having "lacklustre direction, cheap sets [and] poor CGI".
