= Cardinal Burns =

British television sketch show

- Genre: Sketch comedy Surreal humor
- Written by: Seb Cardinal; Dustin Demri-Burns; Matt Morgan; Keith Mottram
- Directed by: Ben Taylor
- Starring: Seb Cardinal; Dustin Demri-Burns
- Country of origin: United Kingdom
- Original language: English
- No. of series: 2
- No. of episodes: 12

Production
- Executive producer: Andy Harries
- Camera setup: Multiple-camera setup
- Running time: 29 minutes
- Production company: Left Bank Pictures

Original release
- Network: BBC Three (Pilot); E4 (series 1); Channel 4 (series 2)
- Release: 8 May 2012 – 28 May 2014

Cardinal Burns is a British television sketch show starring Seb Cardinal and Dustin Demri-Burns. After a pilot on BBC Three, the first series began on 8 May 2012 on E4, before moving to Channel 4 in 2014 for the second series. In 2014 and 2015, it was also performed as a live stage show in London.

== Background ==
Cardinal and Demri-Burns met at film school in Edinburgh, Demri-Burns two years below Cardinal. Having made short films together at film school, when they both moved to London, they began making comic short films together. Some of their work at the time was funded by Scottish Screen.

Demri-Burns, Cardinal and another friend from university became a live comedy trio named Fat Tongue. They performed at the Edinburgh Festival Fringe at The Pleasance, where they were nominated for the if.comedy award (previously known as the Perrier).

The duo say they were influenced by The League of Gentlemen and Human Giant.

== Series 1 (2012) ==
The first series was shown on E4.

Recurring characters included The Office Flirt, a pair of Cockney cabbies, and a middle-class spoken word poet, alongside parodies of Banksy and "scripted reality" programmes such as The Hills and Made in Chelsea.

Ensemble cast members for this series were Bridget Christie, James Puddephatt, Ronnie Lushington, Aisling Bea, Fiona Button, Lucinda Dryzek, Jeff Wode, Simon Coombs, Ayuk Marchant, Clare Warde, William Hartley, Terence Maynard and Travis Oliver.

== Series 2 (2014) ==
Cardinal Burns was renewed by Channel 4 for a second series in September 2012. The Commissioning Editor was Rachel Springett. On 10 May 2013, Channel 4 confirmed that the show would move from E4 to Channel 4.

The second series began airing on 30 April 2014. It contained six episodes, 30 minutes each. The series was produced by Jenna Jones for Left Bank Pictures.

The series included new characters including: Hashtag and Bukake, two Turkish minicab drivers; Curtis, an 80s rapper; and Bert and Moon, two music festival stewards. It also featured returning characters including: Banksy; the Office Flirts; Rachel, Olivia and Yumi in the scripted reality show Young Dreams; and the paranormal investigators Phil and Jase,

== Stage show (2014) ==
In 2014, Cardinal and Burns took their sketch show to stage, performing at the Soho Theatre, London for a two-week run. Some of the sketches used were from their breakout 2009 show for the Edinburgh Fringe Festival. The Guardian called the stage show a "night of cut-above comedy". Chortle described it as an "impressive, varied and well-executed show that dares to be different."

In 2015, the stage show returned to Battersea Arts Centre.

== Awards ==
- 2012: British Comedy Awards, Cardinal Burns was nominated for "Best Comedy Breakthrough Artist", "Best New Comedy Programme", and won the "Best Sketch Show" award.
- 2013: Broadcast Awards, Cardinal Burns won "Best Multichannel Programme" and "Best Comedy Programme"
- 2013: Loaded Lafta Awards (LAFTA), Cardinal Burns won for "Funniest TV Show"
- 2013: BAFTA Nomination for "Best Comedy"

== Reception ==
The series received generally positive reviews. The Guardian praised the characters and performances and called the show "refreshing"; another Guardian article called it "dark, cinematic, puerile and smart in equal measure"; and a third credits it to having reinvented the sketch show. The Independent on Sunday said the show was "sharply written [and] nicely paced", and Metro found it "original and funny".
