= Putney =

District of London

Coordinates: 51.46°N 0.22°W

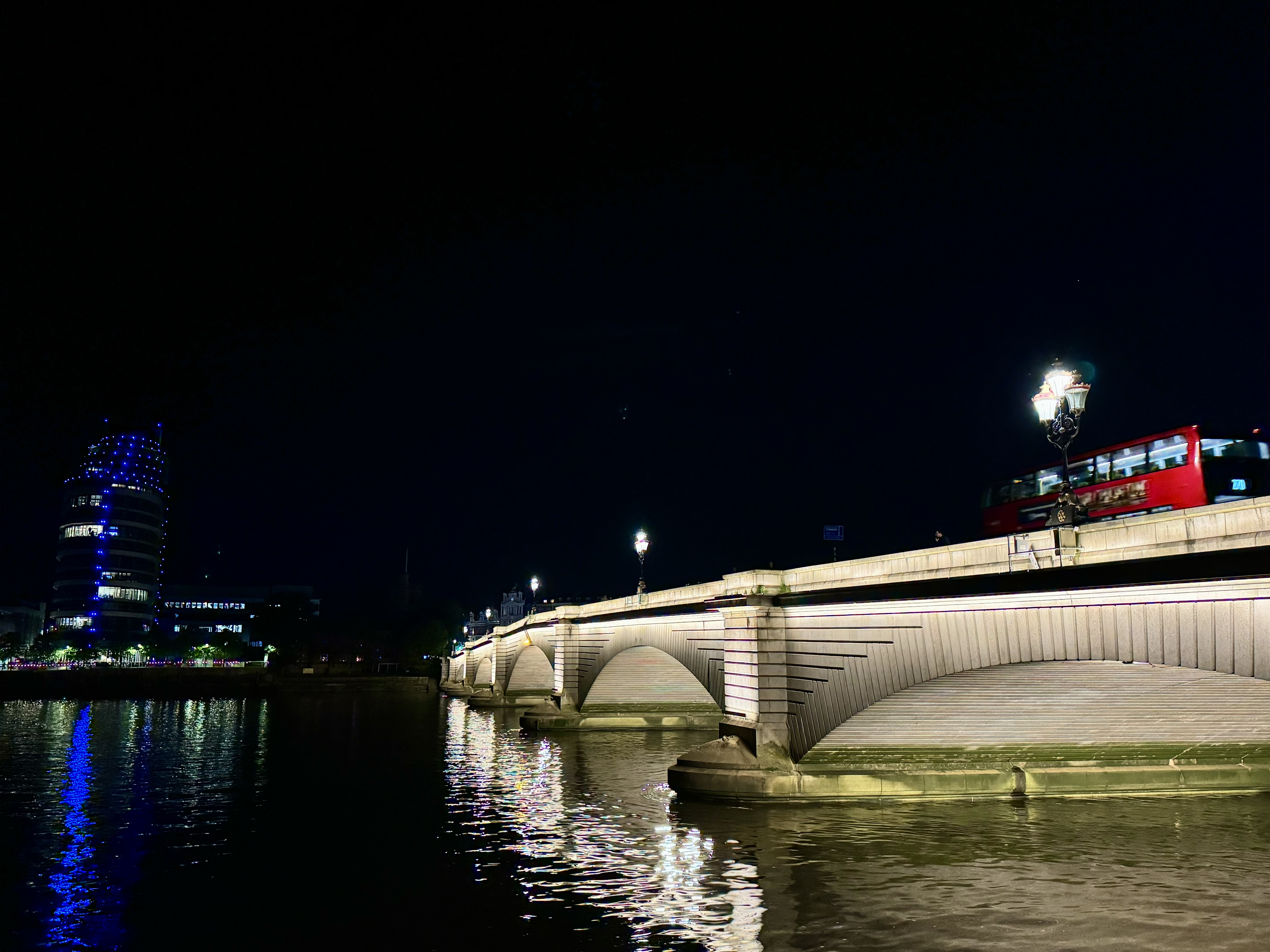
- Putney Bridge at night

- Location within Greater London
- Population: 77,140 (2011 census)
- OS grid reference: TQ235755
- London borough: Wandsworth
- Ceremonial county: Greater London
- Region: London
- Country: England
- Sovereign state: United Kingdom
- Post town: LONDON
- Postcode district: SW15
- Dialling code: 020
- Police: Metropolitan
- Fire: London
- Ambulance: London
- UK Parliament: Putney
- London Assembly: Merton and Wandsworth

Putney (/ˈpʌtni/) is a district in southwest London, England, in the London Borough of Wandsworth, five miles (eight kilometres) southwest of Charing Cross. The area is identified in the London Plan as one of 35 major centres in Greater London.

== History ==
A map showing the Putney ward of Wandsworth Metropolitan Borough as it appeared in 1916

Putney is an ancient parish which covered 9.11 km^{2} (3.52 sq mi) in the Hundred of Brixton in the county of Surrey. Its area has been reduced by the loss of Roehampton to the south-west, an offshoot hamlet that conserved more of its own clustered historic core.

In 1855, the parish was included in the area of responsibility of the Metropolitan Board of Works and was grouped into the Wandsworth District. In 1889, the area was removed from Surrey and became part of the County of London. The Wandsworth District became the Metropolitan Borough of Wandsworth in 1900. On 1 April 1904 the civil parish was abolished to form Wandsworth Borough. At the 1901 census (the last before the abolition of the parish), Putney had a population of 24,139. Since 1965, Putney has formed part of the London Borough of Wandsworth in Greater London.

The benefice of the parish remains a perpetual curacy whose patron is the Dean and Chapter of Worcester Cathedral. The church, founded in the medieval period as a chapel of ease to Wimbledon, was rebuilt in the very early Tudor period. In 1836 it was again rebuilt, and the old tower restored, at an expense of £7,000 (which is approximately equivalent to £690,000 in 2025) defrayed by subscription, a rate, and a grant of £400 from the Incorporated Society. It has a small chantry chapel (originally erected by native Nicholas West, Bishop of Ely (d. 1533), removed from the east end of the south aisle, and rebuilt at the east end of the north side, preserving the old style).

In 1684, Thomas Martyn bequeathed lands for the foundation and support of a charity school for 20 boys, sons of watermen; and by a decree of the Court of Chancery in 1715, the property was vested in trustees. An almshouse for 12 men and women, dedicated to the Holy Trinity, was erected by Sir Abraham Dawes, who provided it with an endowment.

Putney was the birthplace of Thomas Cromwell, made Earl of Essex by Henry VIII; of Edward Gibbon, author of the Decline and Fall of the Roman Empire, who was born in 1737; and also of Clement Attlee, Prime Minister of the United Kingdom 1945–1951 and Leader of the Labour Party 1935–1955, born in 1883. John Toland, a noted free-thinker, died and was buried at Putney in 1722. Robert Wood, Under-Secretary of State for the Southern Department, who published The Ruins of Palmyra about the Roman ruins he visited at Baalbek in Syria, and other archaeological works, lies here. William Pitt, Earl of Chatham, died at a house on Putney Heath.

In the 1840s, Putney was still a part-wooded, part-agricultural village focused close to the Thames, opposite Fulham, with which it was connected by a wooden bridge. It was street-lit with gas, partly paved, and well supplied with water. In 1840, the College for Civil Engineers relocated to Putney.

Putney had a second place of worship for Independents, and Roehampton achieved separate parish status in 1845. The proprietors of the bridge distributed £31 per annum to watermen, and their widows and children, and the parish received benefit from Henry Smith's and other charities. Putney in 1887 covered 9 km^{2} (3.5 sq mi).

=== River crossing ===
Putney appears in the Domesday Book of 1086 as Putelei, although this was "probably a mistake of the Norman scribes". Ultimately the name derives from the Anglo-Saxon Puttan hythe, meaning Putta's landing place. It was noted that it did not fall into the category of local jurisdictions known as a manor, but obtained 20 shillings from the ferry or market toll at Putney belonging to the manor of Mortlake.

The ferry was mentioned in the household accounts of Edward I (reigned 1272–1307): Robert the Ferryman of Putney and other sailors received 3/6d for carrying a great part of the royal family across the Thames and also for taking the king and his family to Westminster.

One famous crossing at Putney was that of Cardinal Wolsey in 1529 upon his 'disgrace' in falling out of favour with Henry VIII and on ceasing to be the holder of the Great Seal of England. As he was riding up Putney Hill, he was overtaken by one of the royal chamberlains who presented him with a ring as a token of the continuance of His Majesty's favour. "When the Cardinal had heard these words of the king, he quickly lighted from his mule and knelt down upon both knees, holding up his hands for joy, and said 'When I consider the joyful news that you have brought to me, I could do no less than greatly rejoice. Every word pierces so my heart, that the sudden joy surmounted my memory, having no regard or respect to the place; but I thought it my duty, that in the same place where I received this comfort, to laud and praise God upon my knees, and most humbly to render unto my sovereign lord my most hearty thanks for the same'".

The first bridge of any kind between the two parishes of Fulham and Putney was built during the Civil War: after the Battle of Brentford in 1642, the Parliamentary forces built a bridge of boats between Fulham and Putney. According to an account from the period:

The Lord-Generall hath caused a bridge to be built upon barges and lighters over the Thames, between Fulham and Putney, to convey his army and artillery over into Surry, to follow the King's forces; and he hath ordered that forts shall be erected at each end thereof to guard it; but for the present the seamen, with long boats and shallops, full of ordnance and musketeers, lie there upon the river to secure it.

The first permanent bridge between Fulham and Putney was completed in 1729. It was the second bridge to be built across the Thames in London (after London Bridge).

One story runs that "in 1720 Sir Robert Walpole was returning from seeing George I at Kingston and being in a hurry to get to the House of Commons rode together with his servant to Putney to take the ferry across to Fulham. The ferry boat was on the opposite side, however and the waterman, who was drinking in the Swan, ignored the calls of Sir Robert and his servant and they were obliged to take another route. Walpole vowed that a bridge would replace the ferry." The Prince of Wales "was often inconvenienced by the ferry when returning from hunting in Richmond Park and asked Walpole to use his influence by supporting the bridge." The bridge was a wooden structure and lasted for 150 years. However, by 1886, it was no longer strong enough to withstand increasing road traffic, and was replaced by the stone bridge that stands today.

=== St Mary's Church ===
The parish church of St Mary the Virgin became the site of the 1647 Putney Debates. Towards the end of the English Civil War, with the Roundheads looking victorious, some soldiers in the New Model Army staged a minor mutiny amid fears that a monarchy would be replaced by a new dictatorship. A number, known as the Levellers, complained: "We were not a mere mercenary army hired to serve any arbitrary power of a state, but called forth ... to the defence of the people's just right and liberties".

A manifesto was proposed entitled An Agreement of the People, and at an open meeting in Putney the officers of the Army Council heard the argument from private soldiers for a transparent, democratic state, without corruption. Proposals included sovereignty for English citizens, Parliamentary seats distributed according to population rather than property ownership, religion made a free choice, equality before the law, conscription abolished and parliamentary elections held every year. While the ideas proved greatly influential, including inspiring much of the language of the United States Declaration of Independence, Oliver Cromwell would later have the Leveller leaders executed.

The diarist Samuel Pepys visited St. Mary's Church on several occasions. During one visit on 28 April 1667, he recorded:

"and then back to Putney Church, where I saw the girls of the schools, few of which pretty; and there I come into a pew, and met with little James Pierce, which I was much pleased at, the little rogue being very glad to see me: his master, Reader to the Church. Here was a good sermon and much company, but I sleepy, and a little out of order, for my hat falling down through a hole underneath the pulpit, which, however, after sermon, by a stick, and the help of the clerke, I got up again, and then walked out of the church."

=== Open spaces and clean air ===
For centuries, Putney was a place where Londoners came for leisure, to enjoy the open spaces and clean air. Londoners came to Putney to play games. According to John Locke, who writes, in 1679: "The sports of England for a curious stranger to see are horse-racing, hawking, hunting, and bowling; at Putney he may see several persons of quality bowling two or three times a week."

One regular visitor was Queen Elizabeth I who frequently visited Putney from 1579 to 1603, often visiting Mr John Lacy. She was said to "honour Lacy with her company more frequently than any of her subjects", often staying for two to three days.

== Putney Heath ==
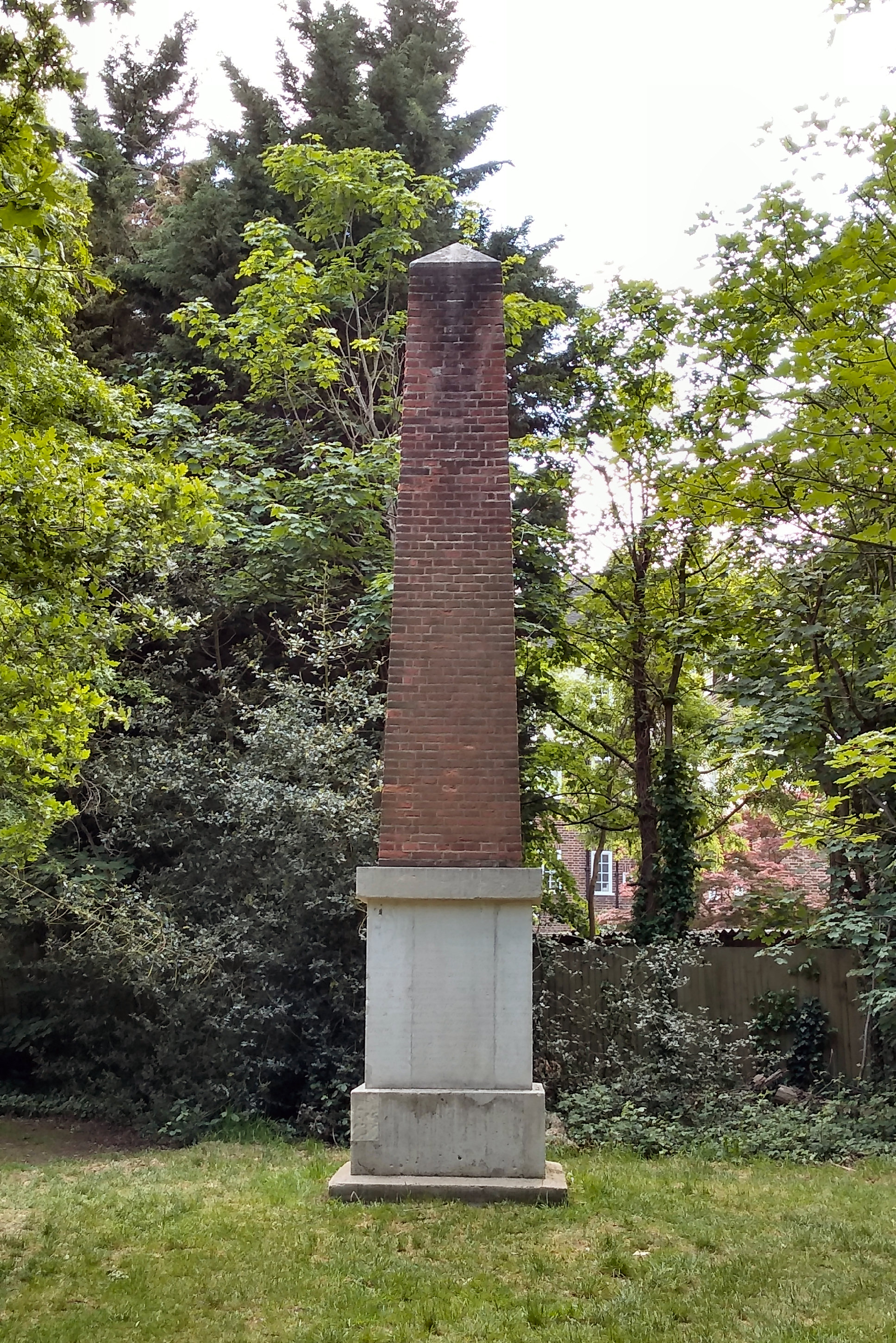
Hartley Memorial Obelisk

Charles II reviewed his forces on Putney Heath in 1684; in May 1767, George III reviewed the Guards, and the Surrey Volunteers at the same spot in 1799. According to Samuel Pepys, Charles II and his brother, the Duke of York, used to run horses here.

A stone and brick obelisk was erected on Putney Heath in 1776, marking the 110th anniversary of the Great Fire of London, to coincide with the invention of the Hartley fire plates by David Hartley (the Younger), near a spot where his fireproof house was built. The obelisk, with ornately detailed foundation stone, is still standing and can be accessed via the car park adjacent to The Telegraph public house, off Wildcroft Road, SW15. The lower part of this house was repeatedly set on fire in the presence, among others, of King George III and Queen Charlotte, the members of Parliament, the Lord Mayor, and the Aldermen. Since 1955, the obelisk has been a Grade II listed building. The adjacent Wildcroft Manor was formerly in the ownership of publishing magnate George Newnes, builder of Putney Library. In 1895 he was created a baronet "of Wildcroft, in the parish of Putney, in the county of London.

Many duels were fought on Putney Heath. In May 1652, George Brydges, 6th Baron Chandos killed Colonel Henry Compton in a duel. On a Sunday afternoon in May 1798 William Pitt, the then Prime Minister, who lived in Bowling-Green House on the heath, fought a bloodless battle with William Tierney MP. The house derived its name from the bowling-green formerly attached to it, and for more than sixty years (1690–1750) was the most famous green in the neighbourhood of London. The house had large rooms for public breakfasts and assemblies, was a fashionable place of entertainment, and was noted for "deep play". Pitt died in the house in 1806. It was later owned by Henry Lewis Doulton, son of Henry Doulton of pottery fame. It was demolished and an art deco style residence rebuilt on the site in 1933. Putney Heath, near the Telegraph pub, was also the venue for the September 1809 duel between Cabinet ministers George Canning and Lord Castlereagh.

Scio House was the last villa on Portsmouth Road abutting the heath: it eventually became a hospital and was known as Scio House Hospital for Officers, Putney. It has since been redeveloped as a gated community of 70 neo-Georgian homes divided between two streets.

Putney Heath has an area of around 400 acres (160 hectares) (less the area occupied by the A3 road). It rises to 45 metres (148 ft) above sea level. Because of its elevation, from 1796 to 1816 Putney Heath hosted a station in the shutter telegraph chain, which connected the Admiralty in London to its naval ships in Portsmouth. One of 10 signal stations with telescopes making observation of the next station's signal, a message could be sent from the Admiralty to Portsmouth within 15 minutes. This was replaced by a semaphore station, which was part of a semaphore line that operated between 1822 and 1847.

Putney Heath was for many years a noted rendezvous for highwaymen. In 1795, the notorious highwayman Jeremiah Abershaw – also known as Jerry Avershaw – was caught in the Green Man pub on the north side of the heath where Putney Hill meets Tibbet's Ride. After execution his body was hung in chains on the heath as a warning to others. An ancient wood fence cattle pound is located opposite the Green Man, adjacent to two huge plane trees, near the bus terminus. This simple wood fence structure, used historically to contain lost livestock, has been listed as a Grade II listed structure since 1983.

A number of fine homes lined Putney Hill and the north face of the heath, west of the Green Man. All had semi-circular carriageway entrances and exits. These included Grantham House, the residence of Lady Grantham; Ripon House; Ashburton House; and Exeter House, occupied by the second Marquis of Exeter. George Cokayne, author of peerage and baronetage publications, died at Exeter House in 1911. Nearby Gifford House was owned by the brewer J. D. Charrington; and Dover House was the seat originally of Lord Dover, afterwards of Lord Clifden. It was owned at the turn of the 20th century by the famous US financier J. P. Morgan.

=== Wealthy commuters ===
With the development of transport routes for the growing financial sector, the area became highly desirable for City gents in the 1890s and they were initially known as "outsiders". In 1900, social researcher Charles Booth had classified the whole area of Putney Hill and West Hill, leading into Putney Heath, as wealthy or well-to-do. Despite a full array of places of worship, he said it was noted for low church attendance, with all denominations "struggling for the souls of pleasure-seeking Putney... the middle class here are as indifferent as the poor elsewhere."

=== Cricket ground ===
The village green at the corner of Wildcroft and Telegraph Roads is used by Roehampton Cricket Club and is one of the oldest cricket teams in London, established 1842. The club has played there continuously since 1859 when lord of the manor, Earl Spencer, suggested it as a new site. It has two sides in the highly competitive Fullers Surrey County League and a Sunday side that plays on a more social level. In 1900, a decade after the death of his multi-millionaire father Junius Morgan, J. P. Morgan gained a fondness for the sport and was made an honorary member. Antarctic explorer Sir Ernest Shackleton, the honorary member who presided at the club dinner in 1910, allowed his two young children to play cowboys and Indians on the cricket green during the week.

The Chelsea Water Company originally owned the reservoir site and allowed construction of the club pavilion on its property. The reservoir site is now owned by Thames Water. Cricket matches continued during the war although some games started late or were drawn due to late starts or air raid sirens. Four German V-1 flying bombs struck the area in World War II. One destroyed the club's pavilion, opposite the Telegraph pub, in July 1944, near the covered water reservoir. Wildcroft Road, turning into Portsmouth Road and thus the future A3, was a main thoroughfare into SW London and became a stop-off point for American servicemen who got out of their jeeps to "taste this crazy cricket game"

=== Funfair ===
On the south side of the reservoir, in the triangle of land between Wildcroft Road, Tibbet's Ride and the Green Man, is a large clearing of land. A funfair is set up on the grounds each October, lasting for one week. Ground rent is paid by the touring company to the Wimbledon and Putney Commons Conservators, and forms part of the income of the charity.

== Local character ==
Excluding the Putney Exchange in a survey by the New Economics Foundation of 27 London high streets in 2005, Putney's ranked fifth most "cloned...[meaning] offering identikit shopping with little local character".

=== Demographics ===
A local directory of Putney in 1932 listed a high proportion of residents as being professional, including doctors and lawyers. The area also was home to significant numbers of retired naval officers.

The 2011 census showed this professional character still present. Looking at a combination of the electoral wards of East Putney, West Putney and Thamesfield (which comprises North Putney), 46% of residents were classified as higher or lower "managerial, administrative & professional" socio-economic status; 6% were retired. Ethnicity in these wards is 81% white, 8% Asian, 5% black, and 4% of mixed or multiple ethnicities. Sixty-five percent of the population was born in the UK. The most identified religion was Christianity at 56%, with 27% declaring no religion, 8% not stating any religion, 5% Muslim and other religions making up the remainder.

The 2011 Census also revealed Thamesfield as having the highest number of Australians and New Zealanders in London, followed by the East Putney ward in second place. Putney is also noted for its high concentration of South African residents; a survey by BBC News found that Putney had more South African residents than any other region in the UK.

== Politics ==
The Putney constituency highlighted in red on a map of Greater London

The Member of Parliament for Putney is Fleur Anderson, who has served as the MP for the constituency since the 2019 general election, as a member of the Labour Party.

Putney is covered by the East Putney and West Putney wards for elections to Wandsworth London Borough Council.

== Rowing and the Boat Race ==
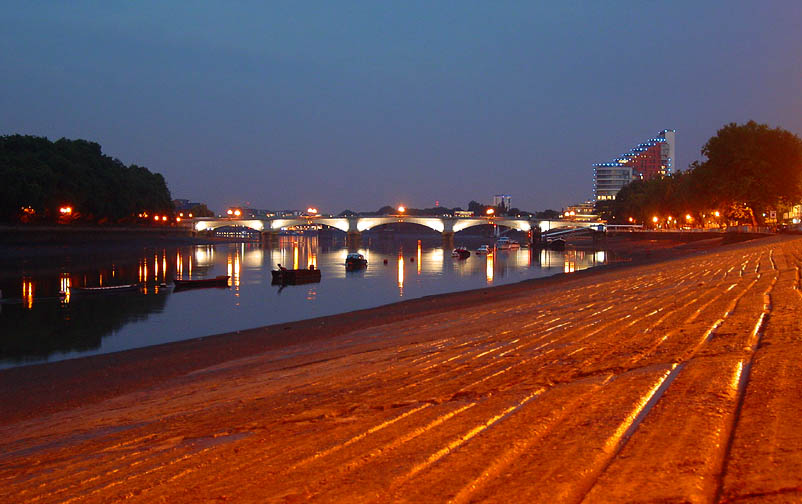
Putney Bridge at night

Since the second half of the 19th century, Putney has been a significant centre for rowing. There are two reasons for this.

First, increasing numbers of steam-powered boats (not to mention the growing levels of sewage being discharged into the river) made leisure rowing on the Thames in central London unpleasant if not impossible. There was much less commercial traffic on the river at Putney (partly because the many buttresses of the original Putney Bridge restricted the transit of large river boats) ensuring more suitable water for rowing. The river was also cleaner at Putney.

Secondly, the construction of the London and South Western Railway from Waterloo to Putney and the District Railway to Putney Bridge allowed easy commuting.

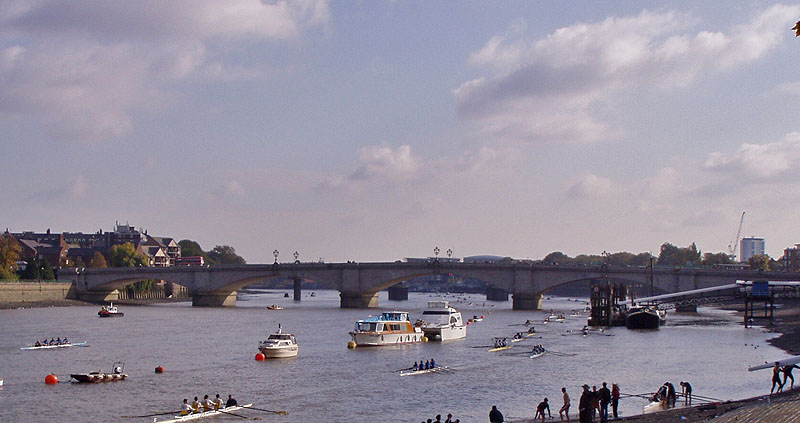
Putney Bridge

More than twenty rowing clubs are based on the River Thames at Putney Embankment in a landscape which now forms part of a Conservation Area identified by the borough council as "unique in London"; among the largest are London Rowing Club, Thames Rowing Club, Imperial College Boat Club and Vesta Rowing Club. Leander Club owned a boathouse in Putney from 1867 to 1961. The Putney clubs have produced a plethora of Olympic medallists and Henley winners. Putney Town Rowing Club, although retaining Putney's name, has now moved to Kew.

The University Boat Race, first contested in 1829 in Henley-on-Thames, has had Putney as its starting point since 1845. Since 1856, it has been an annual event, beginning at the University Stone, just upstream from Putney Bridge.

Several other important rowing races over the Championship Course also either start or finish at the stone, notably the Head of the River Race.

== Sculpture ==
Next to Putney Bridge is one of the sites used in the construction of the Thames Tideway Tunnel. With completion of the project, a new embankment has been constructed with a ventilation column with a poem by Dorothea Smartt running along its length.

=== Putney Sculpture Trail ===
Alan Thornhill lived and worked in Putney for many years and his studio still remains. The sculpture Load was presented to Putney on Fools Day and occupies a permanent position near the south-west end of Putney Bridge on Lower Richmond Road. A film, launched at Appledore and Chichester Film Festivals in 2008 documents these celebrations. The acquisition of eight further large works formed a permanent new riverside Putney Sculpture Trail in the London Borough of Wandsworth, officially unveiled in September 2008.

=== Historic links to sculpture and sculptors ===
Henri Gaudier-Brzeska had a studio in Putney in the last year of his life after moving from 454a Fulham Road. Sydney Schiff went to visit Gaudier there in 1914 to buy the "Dancer", which was later presented to the Victoria and Albert Museum. Gaudier-Brzeska was killed in France in June 1915.

Sir Jacob Epstein was buried in Putney Vale Cemetery on 24 August 1959.

== Plaque ==
A commemorative plaque was placed at 2 Colinette Road in remembrance of an anecdote of the British mathematician G. H. Hardy when he visited Indian mathematician Srinivasa Ramanujan in hospital.

I remember once going to see him when he was ill at Putney. I had ridden in taxi cab number 1729 and remarked that the number seemed to me rather a dull one, and that I hoped it was not an unfavourable omen. "No," he replied, "it is a very interesting number; it is the smallest number expressible as the sum of two cubes in two different ways."

== Transport ==
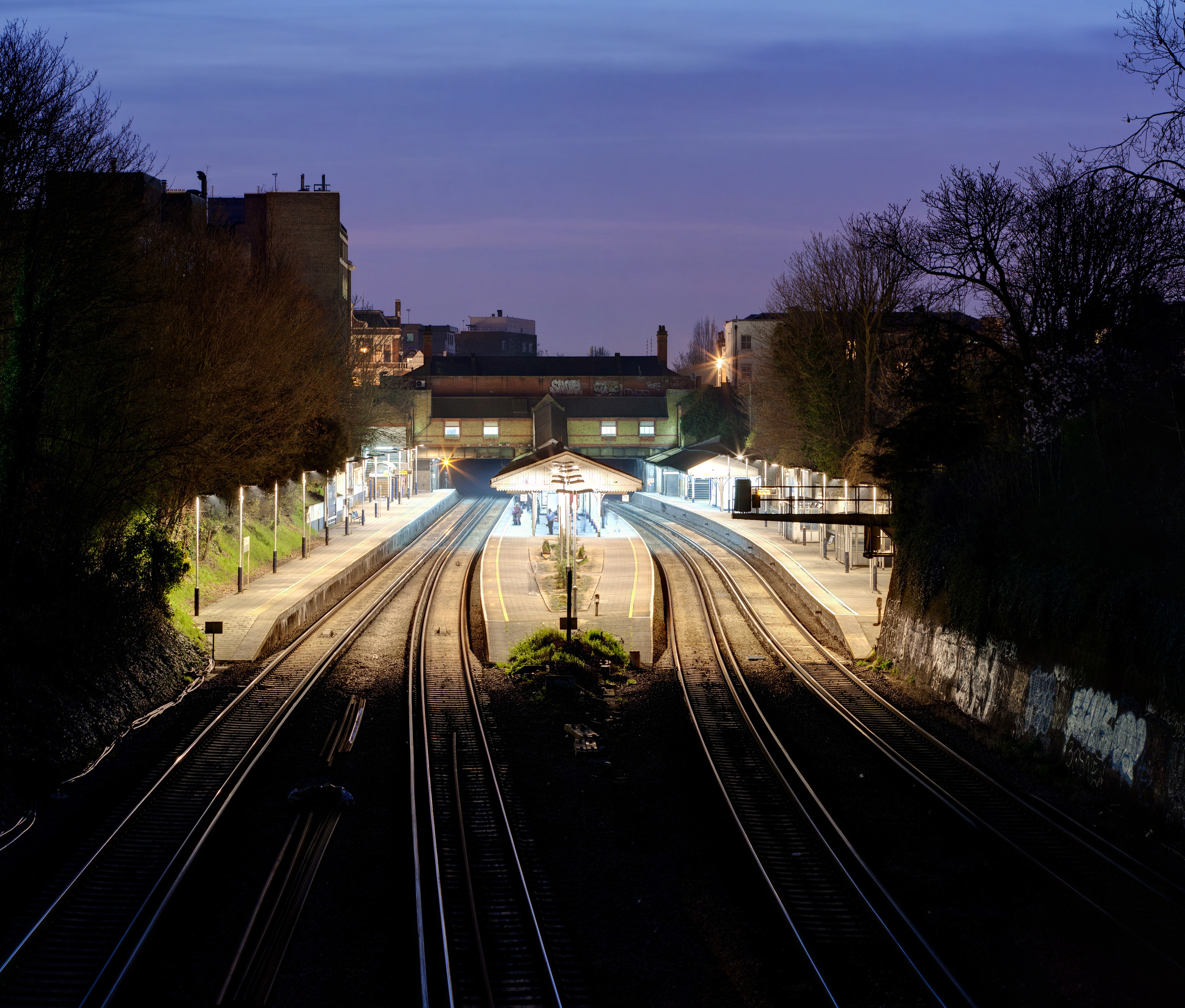
Putney railway station's four platforms as viewed from the east

Putney is served by mainline South Western Railway trains to London Waterloo from Putney station and by London Underground from East Putney. The far west of Putney is also served by Barnes station, a few hundred yards across the boundary, while Putney Bridge tube station is across the river in Fulham.

Putney is served by bus routes 14, 22, 37, 39, 74, 85, 93, 220, 265, 270, 378, 337, 170 424, 430 and 485 and night buses 14, N22, 37, N74, 85, 93 and 220.

Putney Pier is served by River Bus 6 to/from Blackfriars Millennium Pier, weekday peak periods only (Average 24 boats per week day).

== Quotes ==
And thus we take leave of Putney, one of the pleasantest of the London suburbs, as well as the most accessible. The immense increase in the number of houses in late years testifies to its popularity; but there is still an almost unlimited extent of open ground which cannot be covered; and with wood and water, common and hill, there will always be an element of freshness and openness in Putney seldom to be obtained so near London.

— J. C. Geikie, The Fascinations of London, 1903

== Notable residents ==
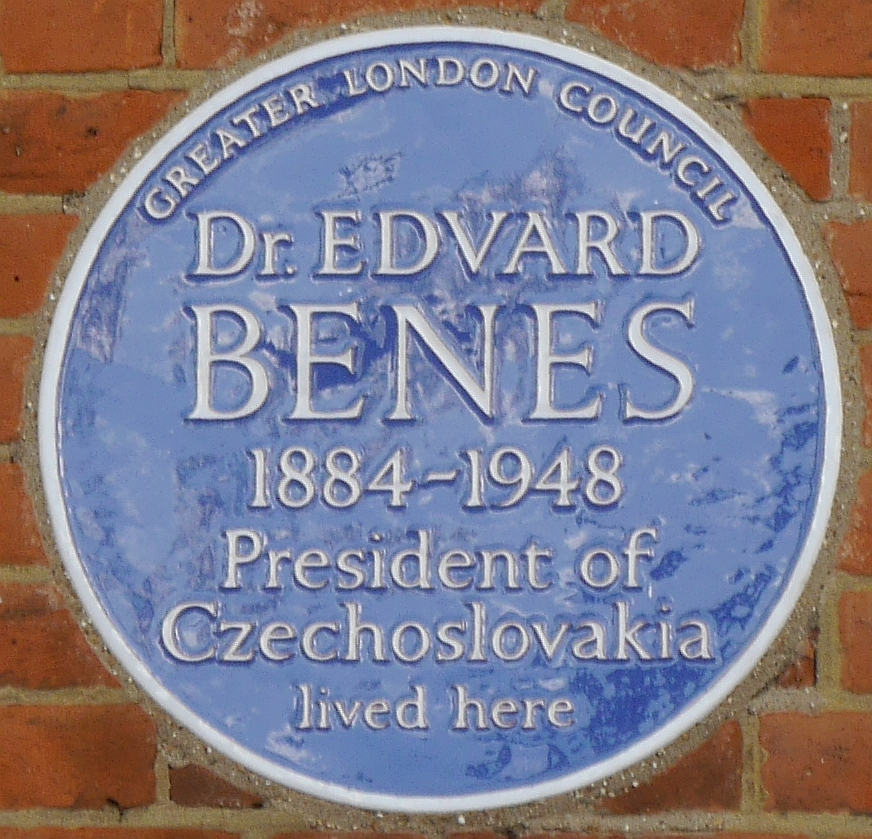
Edvard Beneš blue plaque, 26 Gwendolen Avenue, Putney

Listed in alphabetical order of last name:

=== A–C ===
- Stefan Abingdon, musician, of the band The Midnight Beast
- J. R. Ackerley, author and literary editor of The Listener lived at Star and Garter Mansions from 1941 until his death in 1967
- William Adams, locomotive engineer
- Gerry Anderson and Jim Henson, television puppeteers, at different times leased the same workshop (since demolished) in Rotherwood Road, Putney
- Clement Attlee, Prime Minister of the United Kingdom 1945–1951 and Leader of the Labour Party 1935 –1955, born in Putney in 1883
- Milicent Bagot, British intelligence officer
- Edvard Beneš, second President of Czechoslovakia, lived in Gwendolen Avenue during his exile in London from October 1938 to the end of World War II
- Marc Bolan, singer and leader of the band T.Rex lived at 7a Schubert Road, Putney and died in a car crash in near-by Barnes
- Peter Bonetti, Chelsea and Dundee United footballer, was born in Putney
- Richard Branson, British entrepreneur
- Peter Brett, American writer
- Pierce Brosnan, Irish actor best known for playing James Bond, attended school in Putney
- Dustin Demri-Burns, actor and comedian, attended school in Putney
- Anna Calvi, singer and songwriter
- Rosa Nouchette Carey, writer of children's novels, died at her home in Keswick Road, Putney in 1909
- Christopher Chope, Conservative MP for Christchurch, was born in Putney
- Nick Clegg, Deputy Prime Minister (2010–15) and Leader of the Liberal Democrats (2007–15) lived in Putney before moving to California to work at Facebook
- Tom Courtenay, actor
- Thomas Cromwell, chief minister for Henry VIII and architect of the English Reformation, was born in Putney around 1485
- Taio Cruz, British R&B singer

=== D–H ===
- John Deacon, former bass guitarist of the band Queen, lives in west Putney
- Catherine Maria Fanshawe, poet, died at Putney Heath in 1834
- Jason Flemyng, actor, born in Putney
- E. M. Forster, author, lived at 22 Werter Road, Putney
- Henry Fuseli, Swiss-born British artist, professor of painting and keeper of the Royal Academy
- Constance Garnett, translator of War and Peace, Anna Karenina, Crime and Punishment, and other Russian literary works
- Edward Gibbon, historian, born in Putney, had local telephone exchange named in recognition
- Peter Green, singer/guitarist and co founder of the band Fleetwood Mac lived on Lytton Grove during his youth
- Maria, Countess of Guilford, resident of Putney Hill, 1825
- Kenelm Lee Guinness, racing driver, started the KLG spark plug factory in Putney Vale and lived in Kingston Hill
- Peter Hain, Labour Party MP, lived in Putney in the late-1960s
- Ralph Hill, music critic, lived at 39 Hazlewell Rd in the 1940s until his death in 1950. He founded the Putney Gramophone Society
- Ashley Horne, of the band The Midnight Beast
- Joan Howson (1885–1964) was a British stained glass artist who lived in Deodar Road
- Konnie Huq, television presenter of the children's television programme Blue Peter

=== I–N ===
- Penny Irving, actress (appearances include The Benny Hill Show and Are You Being Served?)
- Mike Jackson, Chief of the General Staff, 2003–06, lived, and attended primary school, in Putney
- Arthur Jeff, British statesman and co-founder of Putney School of Art and Design
- Grace Jones, singer and actress
- Joe Joyce (boxer), British boxer, went to Elliott School
- Robin Knox-Johnston, yachtsman, born in Putney
- Gunji Koizumi, introduced judo to the United Kingdom
- Simon Lane, YouTuber and member of the Yogscast
- Caroline Langrishe, actress lives in Putney
- Simon Le Bon, lead singer of Duran Duran, has a home in Upper Richmond Road, with his wife, Yasmin
- Laurie Lee, author, lived and worked as a builder's labourer in Putney during the 1930s
- Commander Charles Lightoller, the most senior officer to survive the Titanic disaster, lived at 60A Upper Richmond Road
- David Luiz, Chelsea F.C. and Brazilian international footballer
- James Macpherson, translator and author of the Ossian Poems
- David McKee, creator of Mr Benn, lived at 54 Festing Road ("at 52 Festive Road"), subsequently re-broadcast. Outside engraved paving slab
- Sue McNuff née Handscomb, Olympic rower, was brought up in Putney
- JP Morgan, US financier, occupied Dover House, Putney
- George Newnes, publishing magnate, lived at Putney
- Sidney Nolan, one of Australia's leading artists of the 20th century, known for his paintings of Ned Kelly, who lived at 79 Deodar Road.

=== O–S ===
- Lawrence Oates, Antarctic explorer, born and raised in Putney
- Edna O'Brien Irish author of The Country Girls and more lived in Putney in the 1960s
- Dick Pepper (1889–1962), banjo-player and writer, was born in Putney
- Catherine Louisa Pirkis (1839–1910), author of Victorian detective fiction, lived in Putney as an adult
- William Pitt the Younger, Prime Minister, lived and died in Bowling-Green House at Putney Heath
- Roy Plomley (1914–1985), broadcaster, lived at 91 Deodar Road.
- Richard Pollard (1505–1542), MP for Taunton (1536) and Devon (1539, 1542), resided chiefly at Putney
- David Rock (architect), former RIBA president, lived in West Row, Westleigh Avenue
- Ellen Mary Rope (1855–1934), a British sculptor who lived in Deodar Road
- Margaret Edith Rope (1891–1988) was an English stained-glass artist who lived in Deodar Road
- Justin Rose, golfer, has a flat in Putney
- Ronald Ross, discoverer of malaria transmission by mosquitoes, lived and died at Bath House, Putney Hill
- Fred Russell, known as the "Father of Modern Ventriloquism", remembered by blue plaque, lived in Lower Richmond Road near Putney Bridge
- Abdus Salam, theoretical physicist and Nobel Laureate, lived at Campion Road for almost 40 years and was honoured by an English Heritage blue plaque in 2020
- Ruth Sanger (1918–2001), Australian expert on blood groups, died in Putney
- Harry Gordon Selfridge, founder of Selfridges department store, lived in Putney and died in a flat on Putney Heath in 1947
- Shas Sheehan, Liberal Democrat politician and life peer
- Sophie Simnett, actress
- Freda Skinner, (1911–1993) sculptor and woodcarver, lived at 79 Deodar Road, Putney
- A. W. Smith, market gardener
- Sir Oswald Stoll, Australian-born British theatre and film magnate, lived at 33 Putney Hill
- Algernon Charles Swinburne, poet and Nobel prize nominee, lived and died at The Pines at the foot of Putney Hill

=== T–Z ===
- Daley Thompson, former decathlete
- Gabriel Thomson, actor, attended Elliott School
- Alan Thornhill, sculptor whose nine large works form the permanent Putney Sculpture Trail along the Thames
- Harry Tincknell, racing driver
- Fernando Torres, former Spanish International footballer, played for Chelsea F.C.
- Caroline Charlotte Townshend (1878–1944) was a British stained glass artist who lived in Deodar Road
- Alliott Verdon-Roe, pioneer aviator and founder of aircraft manufacturer AVRO
- Dennis Waterman, actor grew up in Putney and attended Granard School
- Theodore Watts-Dunton, who looked after Swinburne
- Nigel Williams, author
- Mary Wollstonecraft Shelley, author of Frankenstein, lived in Putney at Layton House in 1839, and White House in 1843
- Jack Whitehall, comedian
- Michael Whitehall, talent agent
- Leonard Woolf, husband of Virginia Woolf, grew up in Putney
- Tony Wright, film star, lived in Chartfield Avenue
- Peter Zinovieff, British composer, musician and inventor. founder in 1969 of Electronic Music Studios (EMS), world famous for some of the most innovative and earliest synthesizers
- Sofka Zinovieff, daughter of Peter Zinovieff, writer, grew up in Putney

== Nearest places ==
Nearby settlements include Hammersmith, Fulham, Barnes, East Sheen, Roehampton, Petersham, Wimbledon, Southfields, Earlsfield and Wandsworth Town.

== See also ==
- Little Australia
