= Dustin Demri-Burns =

English actor, comedian, and writer

- Other name: Dustin Demri Burns
- Education: London Academy of Music and Dramatic Art
- Occupations: Actor, comedian, writer
- Years active: 2003–present
- Notable work: Cardinal Burns
- Children: 1

Dustin Demri-Burns is a British actor, comedian and writer. He is best known for his work in Cardinal Burns (2012–2014), Slow Horses (2022), and Criminal Record (2026)

He appeared in films as Danny Sinclair in Alan Partridge: Alpha Papa (2013), Viktor in the action comedy film The Spy Who Dumped Me (2018), and Crazy Cedric in the comedy film Horrible Histories: The Movie – Rotten Romans (2019).

In television, he appeared in shows as Julian in Stath Lets Flats, Will_5000 in Sick Note, Simon in GameFace, Daniel in Turn Up Charlie, and Voltaire in The Great.

== Early life and education ==
Dustin Demri-Burns attended Elliott School, Putney, Putney Heath, southwest London from 1989 to 1996. He graduated from the London Academy of Music and Dramatic Art with a degree in acting.

== Career ==
Demri-Burns started his acting career when he played a minor character in the short film Nightswimming (2003).

His film credits include The Spy Who Dumped Me, Bridget Jones' Baby, Grimsby, and Kill Your Friends.

He played the role of Danny Sinclair in the 2013 film Alan Partridge: Alpha Papa, featuring Steve Coogan, and has also played the role of Cedric in the 2019 film Horrible Histories: The Movie - Rotten Romans. The same year, he also started in Abigail Blackmore's film Tales from the Lodge, alongside Kelly Wenham, Mackenzie Crook, Laura Fraser, Sophie Thompson and Johnny Vegas.

Along with his friend Sebastian Cardinal, he created and produced the sketch comedy programme Cardinal Burns.

Demri-Burns has provided voices of characters in animation, such as the voice of Grumpy in Digby Dragon and as the UK/U.S. voice of Tread in Bob the Builder.

In 2020, he played the role of Voltaire in season 1 of the Hulu television series The Great, featuring Elle Fanning and Nicholas Hoult. He reprised his role as a recurring character in seasons 2 (2021) and 3 (2023) of the show.

In the second series of Criminal Record, released in 2026, he is featured as the key antagonist, far-right influencer and conspirator Cosmo Thompson, the Guardian crediting him with "another ferociously watchable turn," as "an athleisure-suited charmer from the oi-oi-saveloy school of fascism."

== Filmography ==
=== Film ===
Key
†	Denotes films that have not yet been released

Year	Title	Role	Notes
2003	Nightswimming	Young Man	Short film
2004	Shade	–	Short film. Director
2004	Out of the Shadows	Boy in Graveyard	Short film
2007	Prada & Prejudice	Clown	Short film. Also writer
2009	HIV: The Musical	Jolian	Short film
2013	I Give It a Year	Dove Violinist	
2013	Alan Partridge: Alpha Papa	Danny Sinclair	
2014	Chandide	Pangloss	Short film
2015	Kill Your Friends	David Schneider	
2016	Grimsby	Analyst #2	Also known as: The Brothers Grimsby (U.S. & Canada). Uncredited role
2016	Bridget Jones's Baby	Interviewer	Uncredited role
2017	Bob the Builder: Mega Machines	Tread / Thud (voices)	UK/U.S. versions
2018	The Short of It	Man	Short film
2018	The Spy Who Dumped Me	Viktor	
2018	The Orgy	Gary	Short film
2018	Diane's New Boyfriend	Jerry	Short film
2019	Tales from the Lodge	Paul	
2019	Horrible Histories: The Movie - Rotten Romans	Crazy Cedric	
2021	All My Friends Hate Me	Harry	
2026	The Magic Faraway Tree	Saucepan Man	
2026	Merry Christmas Aubrey Flint	Hugo Fox	
TBA	Close Personal Friends †	TBA	Post-production

=== Television ===
Year	Title	Role	Notes
2006	Coming Up	Writer 1	1 episode
2007	Hyperdrive	Queppu Warrior	1 episode
2007	Saxondale	Brian May	1 episode
2008	Love Soup	Kenny	1 episode
2010	The Persuasionists	Focus Group member	1 episode
2011	Life's Too Short	Best Man	1 episode
2012	Spy	Didier	1 episode
2012–2014	Cardinal Burns	Various roles	Main role, 12 episodes. Also writer
2013	The Mimic	Computer Geek / PC Universe Worker 2	2 episodes
2014	Bad Education	Philip	1 episode
2014	Psychobitches	Various roles	Miniseries, 4 episodes. Also writer on 3 episodes
2015	Asylum	Ludo Backslash	Miniseries, 3 episodes
2015–2017	Drunk History: UK	Various roles	Recurring role, 9 episodes
2015–2018	Bob the Builder	Sylvain / Phil Lucas / Tread / Thud / Crunch / Norm (voices)	Recurring role, 15 episodes. UK/U.S. versions
2016	Peaky Blinders	Monsieur Silk	1 episode
2016	Digby Dragon	Grumpy Goblin (voice)	Main role, 11 episodes
2017–2018	Urban Myths	Josef; Francis Rossi	2 episodes
2017–2018	Sick Note	Will_5000	Recurring role, 5 episodes
2017–2019	GameFace	Simon	Main role, 8 episodes
2018	A Discovery of Witches	Sean	1 episode, uncredits
2018–2019	Stath Lets Flats	Julian	Recurring role, 8 episodes
2019	Turn Up Charlie	Daniel Smith	3 episodes
2019	The Dark Crystal: Age of Resistance	Daudran (voice)	2 episodes
2019	The Capture	Francis	2 episodes
2020	King Gary	Fred	1 episode
2020	Truth Seekers	Kettering / Doctor Kettering	1 episode
2020–2023	The Great	Voltaire	Recurring role, 7 episodes
2021	Bloods	Crackhead John	1 episode
2021	Britannia	Blain	Recurring role, 7 episodes
2022	Ellie & Natasia	Various characters	1 episode
2022	The Flatshare	Phil	Recurring role, 5 episodes
2022	Slow Horses	Min Harper	Recurring role, 10 episodes
2022	The Heroic Quest of the Valiant Prince Ivandoe	Additional voices	1 episode
2022–present	Am I Being Unreasonable?	Dan	Main role; 12 episodes
2024	3 Body Problem	Ted	Episode: "The Stars Our Destination"
2024	The Decameron	Arriguccio	3 episodes
2024	Sweetpea	Jeff	Main role, 5 episodes
2025	Dope Girls	Damaso Salucci	Recurring role, 6 episodes
2026	Criminal Record	Cosmo Thompson	Season 2

=== Video game ===
Year	Title	Role	Notes
2012	Harry Potter for Kinect	Professor Flitwick (voice)	
