= Wandsworth Town railway station =

National Rail station in London, England

Wandsworth Town
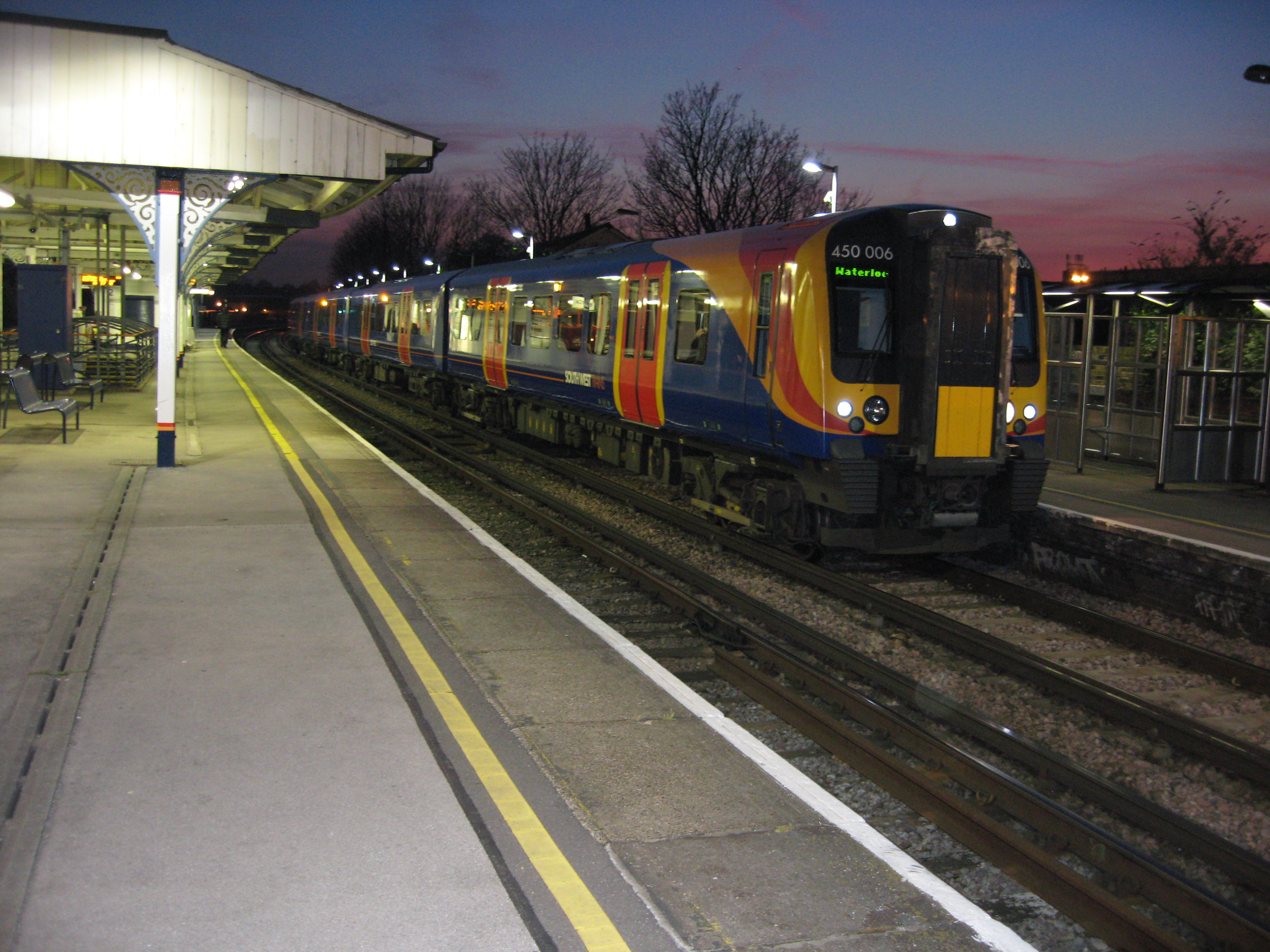
- Interactive map of Wandsworth Town

General information
- Location: Wandsworth
- Local authority: London Borough of Wandsworth
- Managed by: South Western Railway
- Station code: WNT
- DfT category: C2
- Number of platforms: 4
- Fare zone: 2

National Rail annual entry and exit
- 2020–21: ▼0.951 million
- 2021–22: ▲2.535 million
- 2022–23: ▲3.339 million
- 2023–24: ▲3.593 million
- 2024–25: ▲3.786 million

Key dates
- 27 July 1846: Opened

Other information
- External links: Departures; Facilities
- Coordinates: 51.4609°N 0.1879°W

Wandsworth Town railway station is in the London Borough of Wandsworth, in south London, in London fare zone 2. It is 4 miles 60 chains (7.6 km) down the line from London Waterloo.

The station and all trains serving it are operated by South Western Railway.

== History ==
The station opened as Wandsworth when the Nine Elms to Richmond line came into service on 27 July 1846. It was shifted east to its present location in "around 1860". It was renamed Wandsworth Town on 7 October 1903.

On 1 December 1958 burglars used gelignite to break into the safe in the booking hall. However, there was only £10.00 (equivalent to £204 in 2025) in the safe. The station was attacked again in 1973 when the recently redecorated station was set ablaze. The ticket office was completely burned out and the entrance hall, staircase, staff room and engineers' store were badly damaged. Just under two years later, on 11 November 1974, the temporary booking office was set alight which also carried through the staircase and damaged the platform buildings.

== Services ==
All services at Wandsworth Town are operated by South Western Railway.

The typical off-peak service in trains per hour is:

- 4 tph to London Waterloo
- 2 tph to Teddington via Richmond, returning to London Waterloo via Kingston and Wimbledon
- 2 tph to Weybridge via Hounslow

Additional services call at the station during the peak hours.

Preceding station	National Rail	Following station
Clapham Junction	South Western Railway Hounslow Loop Line	Putney
Clapham Junction	South Western Railway Kingston Loop Line	Putney

== Connections ==
London Buses routes 28, 44 and night routes N28 and N44 serve the station.

== Improvement work ==
In August 2010 a major upgrade was approved to build a new ticket office with ticket barriers on York Road. Work started in January 2011.

A scheme to provide lift access and a second entrance at the station started in 2026.

== See also ==
- Wandsworth Common railway station
