= London Buses route 37 =

London bus route

37
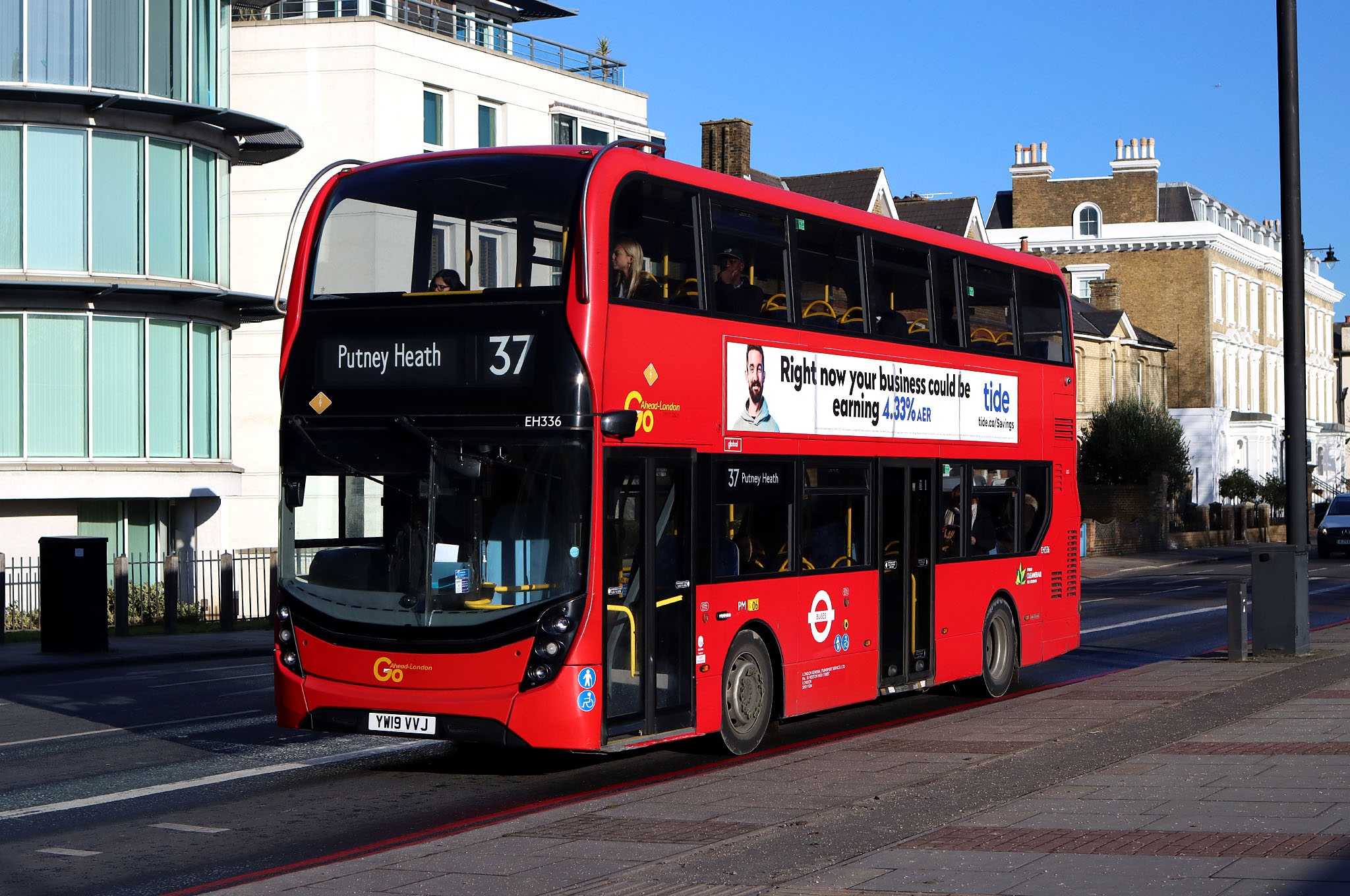
- London Central Alexander Dennis Enviro400H MMC at Wandsworth Common in January 2024

Overview
- Operator: London Central (Go-Ahead London)
- Garage: Peckham

Route
- Start: Peckham
- Via: North Dulwich; Herne Hill; Brixton; Clapham Common; Wandsworth
- End: Putney Heath

London Buses route 37 is a Transport for London contracted bus route in London, England. Running between Peckham and Putney Heath, it is operated by Go-Ahead London subsidiary London Central.

== History ==
During World War I it was operated with naphtha-powered vehicles. The route was the first in London to be staffed by a female conductor from 1 November 1915.

Five AEC Regent I double-decker buses with open tops were ordered by Charles Pickup for route 37 on weekdays in 1932, now running between Peckham and Richmond. It was later extended to Hounslow.

In April 1997, the route gained a night bus variant, route N37. It was the 50th night bus route to begin operation in London. This route was withdrawn when the 37 became a 24-hour service in April 2004.

Route 37 was selected by Transport for London to be the trial route for the operation of two Wright SRM double-deckers on Volvo B5LHC hybrid-electric chassis in 2018. These buses were equipped with roof-mounted pantograph chargers that could charge the B5LHC's batteries when attached to Volvo 'OppCharge' opportunity charging gantries, scheduled to be installed at the 37's termini at Peckham bus station and Putney Heath, which would allow for the SRMs to run for 4.3 miles (6.9 km) each direction in battery electric bus mode. However, the trial SRMs eventually entered service on 1 August 2018 as conventional hybrids after TfL abandoned plans to install the opportunity charging gantries, stating there was insufficient space at Peckham bus station and Putney Heath.

== Current route ==
Route 37 operates via these primary locations:

- Peckham bus station
- Peckham Rye station
- East Dulwich
- North Dulwich station
- Herne Hill station
- Brixton
- Clapham Common station
- Clapham Junction station
- Wandsworth High Street
- East Putney station
- Putney station
- Putney Heath Green Man
