= Alan Thornhill =

British artist & sculptor (1921–2020)

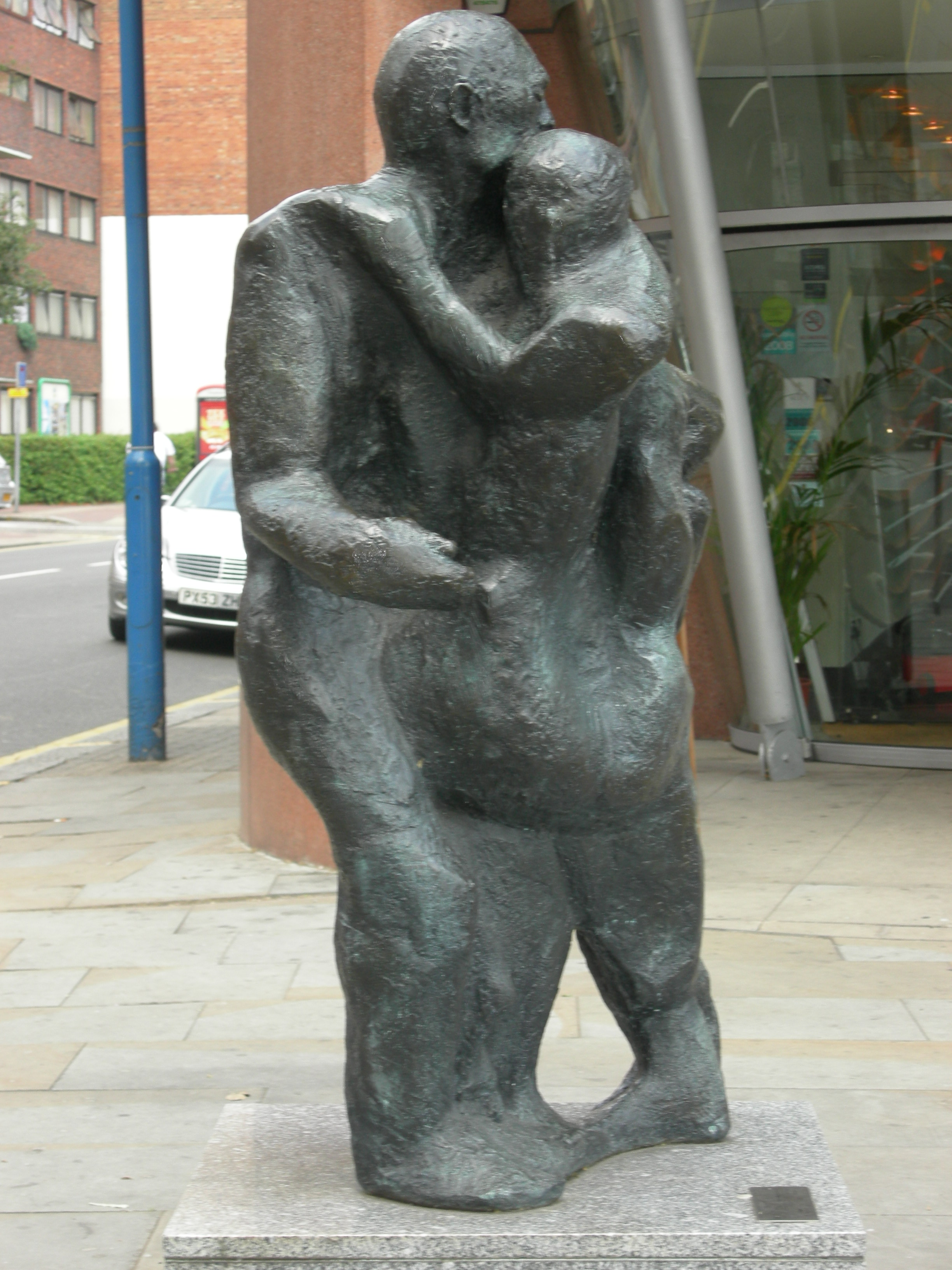
Load

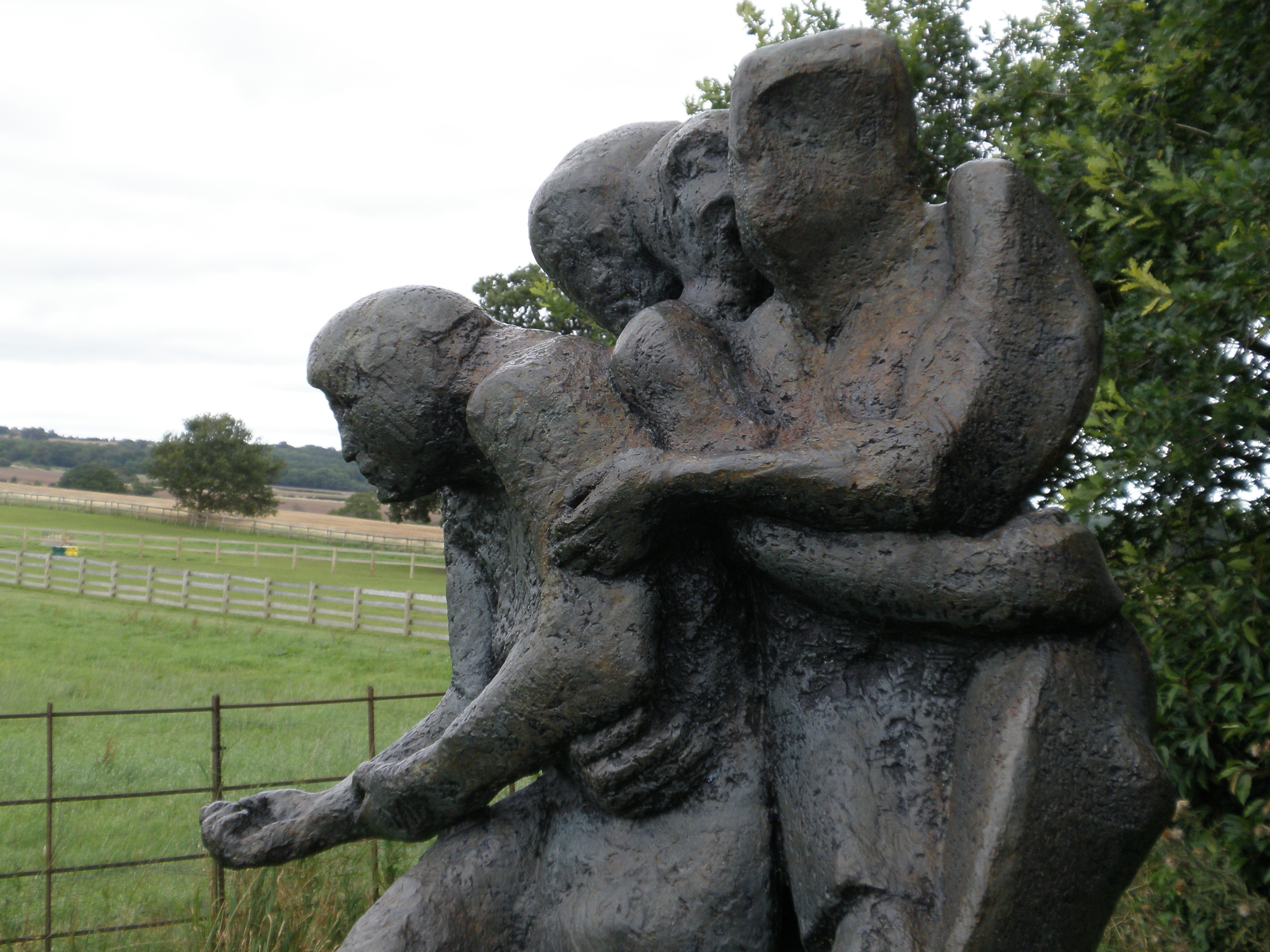
Bond

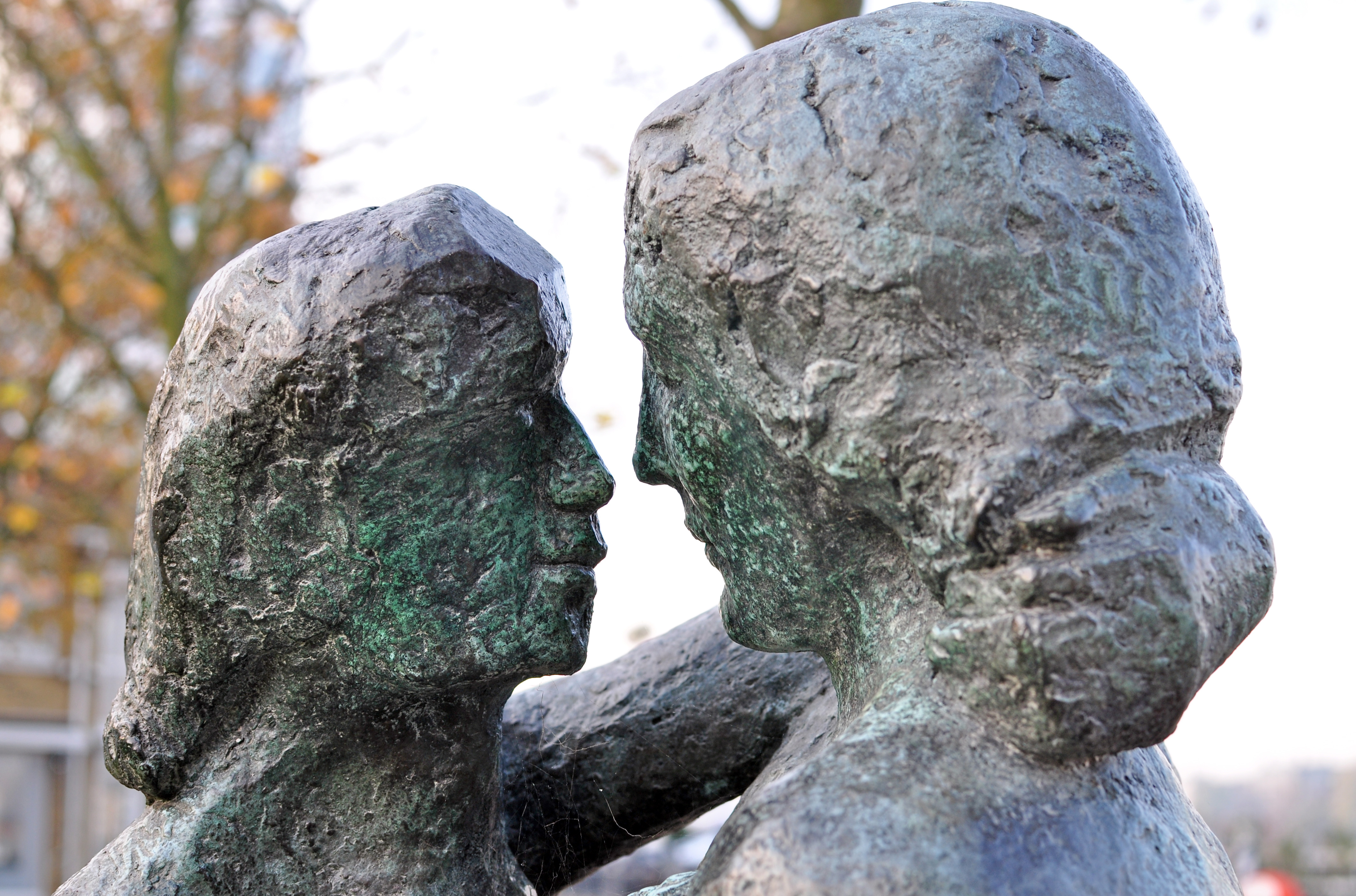
Fall

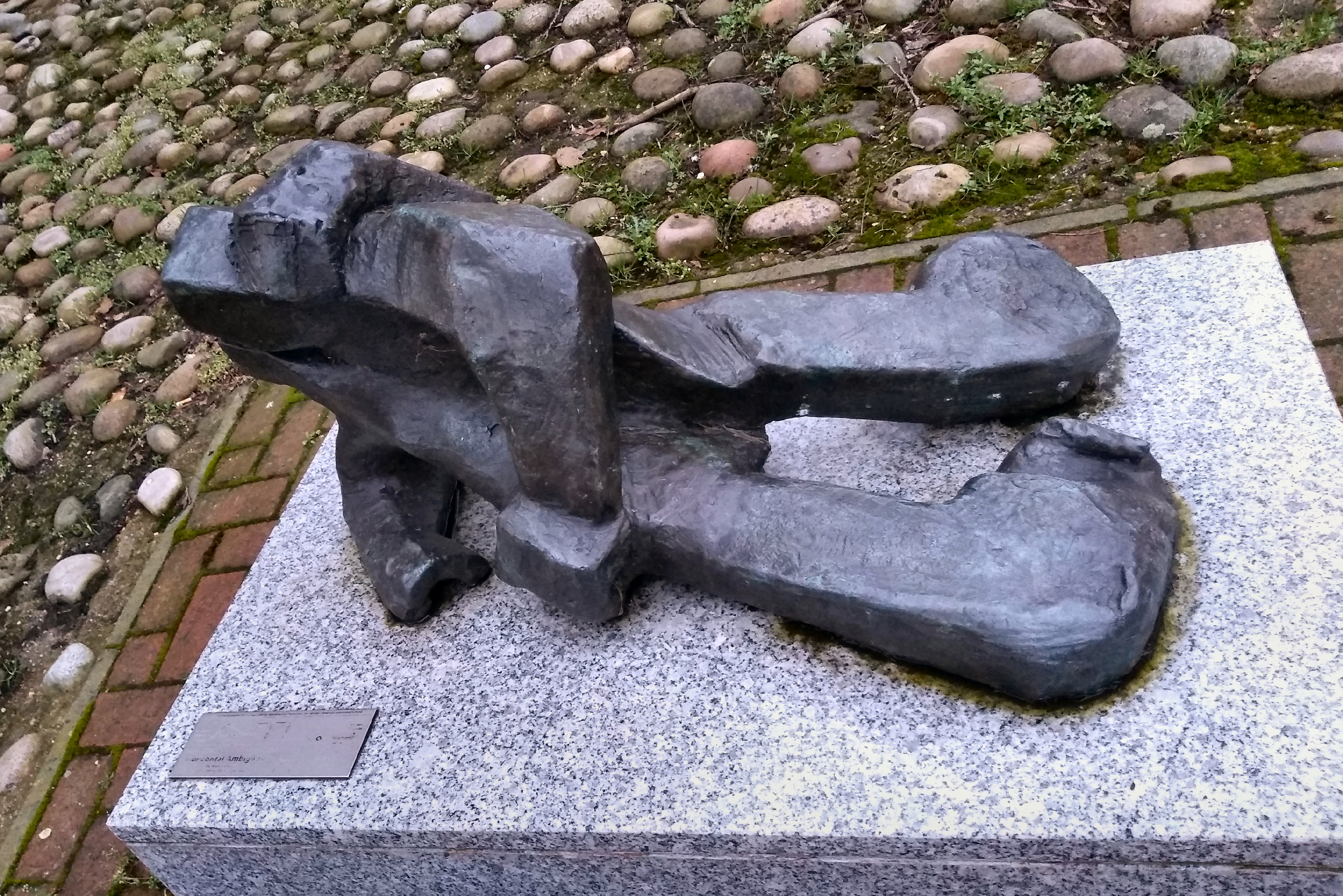
Horizontal Ambiguity

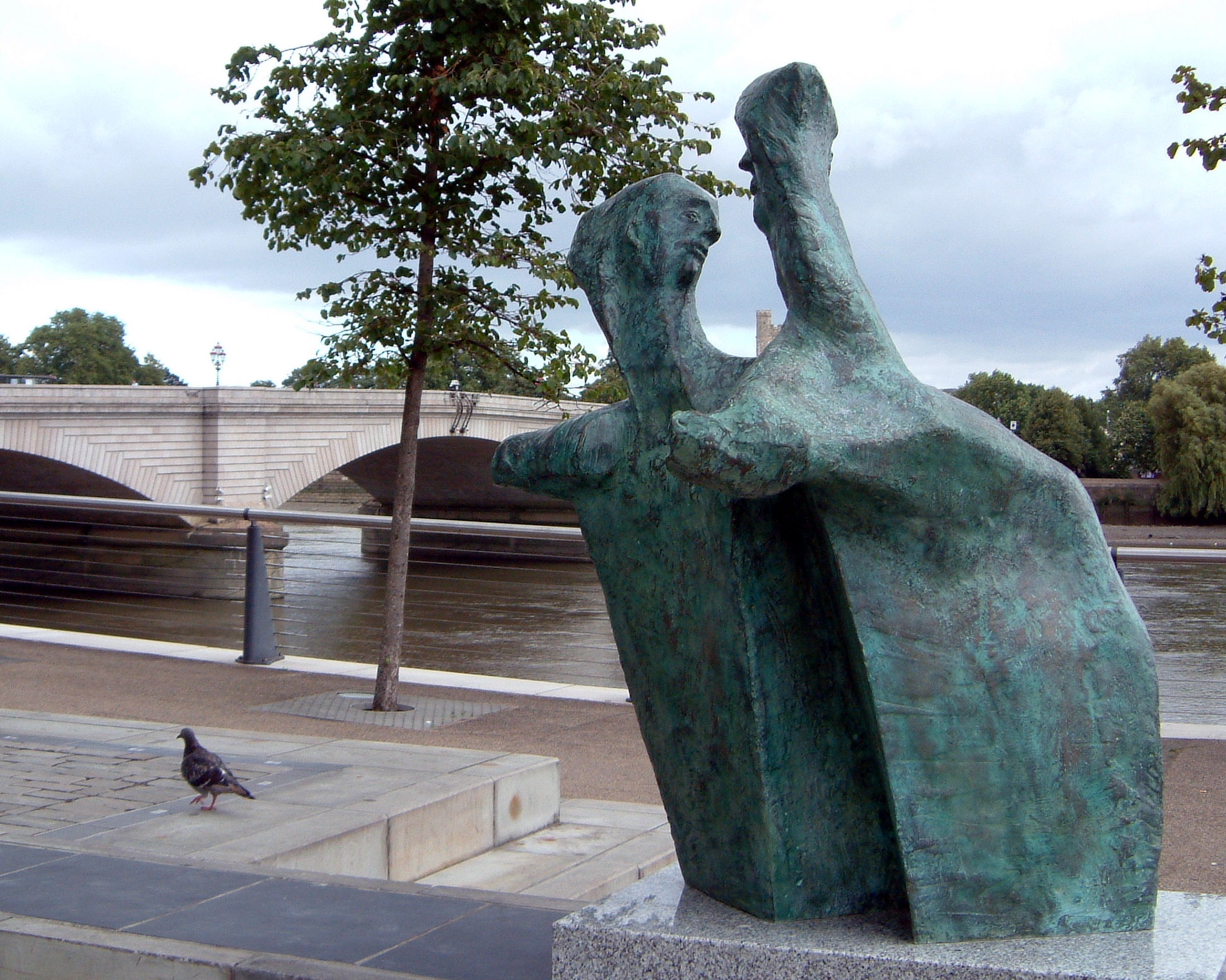
Punch and Judy

Alan Thornhill (1921 – March 4, 2020) was a British artist and sculptor whose long association with clay developed from pottery into sculpture. His output includes pottery, small and large scale sculptures, portrait heads, paintings and drawings. His evolved methods of working enabled the dispensing of the sculptural armature to allow improvisation, whilst his portraiture challenges notions of normality through rigorous observation.

== Biography ==
Born in London, he grew up in Fittleworth, West Sussex, attended Radley College, and then in 1939 went to New College to read Modern History. In 1944 he returned to Oxford, having been exempted from military service as a conscientious objector. He obtained his degree, and spent a year in Italy based in Florence, teaching English at Pisa University. He then stayed six months in Oslo undergoing Reichian therapy, from which came the decision to try working with his hands.

In 1949 he was accepted for the pottery course at Camberwell under Dick Kendall and Nora Braden, followed by a year at Farnham under Henry Hammond and Paul Barron, before moving in 1951 to Eastcombe, Gloucestershire, where Hawkley Pottery was set up. In 1958, frustrated by the repetition involved in making and selling pots, he started to gravitate towards claywork and sculpture through friendship with established sculptors Lynn Chadwick and Jack Greaves. In 1959 he moved to London, having found a property in Putney which included a semi-derelict outbuilding that became his studio, which still exists. Latterly he was largely based near Stroud, Gloucestershire.

He first taught claywork at Kingston, Barking Regional College, Rush Green College of Further Education and then sculpture at Morley College, London between 1970 and 1987, and at the former Frink School of Sculpture where he was a founder trustee and with a later teaching role (1995–2001).

He was married to the painter Sheila Denning, with whom he set up Hawkley Pottery; the marriage ended in divorce.

== Working methods ==
Devising his own way of working which dispensed with the traditional sculptor's armature, he began working with random clay elements, constructed of coarse clay with uniform thickness, so that sculpture could develop, be turned and incorporate subconscious impulses in building the work. The assemblage of clay elements was dried and slowly kiln fired, if necessary being cut up to accommodate to the size of kiln and then rejoined after firing. The simple impetus was the desire to produce another sculpture, yet the later resulting large works – part figurative, part abstract, came to echo pre-occupations for him at that time. The process of improvisation and avoiding pre-conceived ideas (and in his portraiture, avoiding notions of normality through rigorous observation) continues to be taught through some of his own former pupils. His writings include notes about portraiture and the nature of the creative process.

== Portraiture ==
His portraiture in public collections includes:

- Hugh MacDiarmid (Christopher Murray Grieve) – purchased in 1978 for the Primary Collection of the National Portrait Gallery in London
- Emanuel Shinwell (Manny, later, Lord) – Bronze head was purchased (accession number S.309) for the Collection of Glasgow City Art Gallery. in 1973.
- A. S. Neill, the renowned educationist of Summerhill School – Bronze heads are located at the Scottish National Portrait Gallery, Edinburgh and the American College of Orgonomy, New York.
- Tom Stoppard – A bronze head is part of Stoppard archive at the Harry Ransom Center at The University of Texas at Austin.
- Sydney Gordon Russell – Bronze head is in the collection of the Gordon Russell Museum in Broadway, Worcestershire.
- A Self-portrait is in the collection of New College, Oxford.

Other eminent figures who have sat for Thornhill include Enoch Powell, Christabel Bielenberg, Frank Cousins, Richard Rodney Bennett, Michael Cardew, Sir Colin Davis, Dennis Silk and Basil Bunting.

== Public sculpture ==
Public works formerly included Bond, purchased by the permanent collection of the Jerwood Foundation at Jerwood Sculpture, Ragley Hall before its closure.

Nine large works now form the Putney Sculpture Trail along the River Thames at Putney in the Borough of Wandsworth, formally opened in September 2008. Load has been on Putney Embankment since 1989.

'Summoner' and 'Punch and Judy', two large bronze sculptures, are on permanent display in the Walled Garden of the Museum in the Park, Stroud, Gloucestershire. In addition, the Museum has other large bronze sculptures in their collection (but not always on display), these are 'Exit', 'Animaversion' and 'Together'. The Museum also holds some charcoal drawings and small terracotta works, such as 'Drowning Woman with Rescuer'.

== Biographical film ==
A 40-minute documentary, produced by his daughter Anna Thornhill, Spirit in Mass: Journey into Sculpture, was released in 2008 with an award from Screen South and UK Film Council. This was launched in Oxford and subsequently appeared at the Appledore Visual Arts Festival 2008 and Chichester International Film Festival. Artist and writer Clare Carswell is interviewed in the film.

== Henry Moore Institute Archive ==
The bronze sculpture, Walking and Talking and many of the files and papers relating to Thornhill's portraits were acquired in 2007 by the Henry Moore Institute in Leeds, UK.
