= Putney railway station =

National Rail station in London, England

Putney
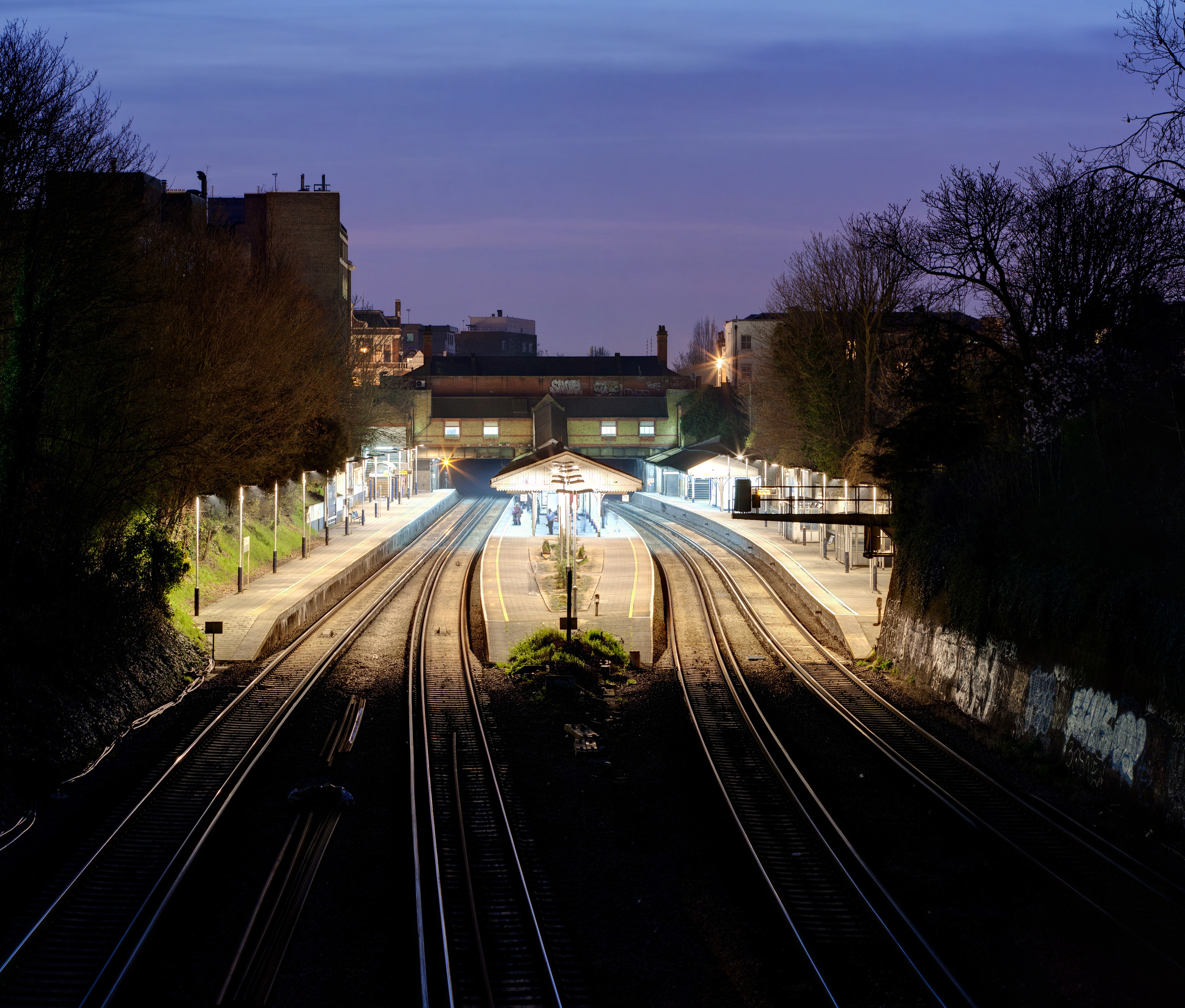
- Interactive map of Putney

General information
- Location: Putney
- Local authority: London Borough of Wandsworth
- Managed by: South Western Railway
- Station code: PUT
- DfT category: C1
- Number of platforms: 4
- Accessible: Yes
- Fare zone: 2 and 3
- OSI: East Putney

National Rail annual entry and exit
- 2020–21: ▼1.964 million
- 2021–22: ▲4.538 million
- 2022–23: ▲5.118 million
- 2023–24: ▲5.301 million
- 2024–25: ▲5.645 million

Railway companies
- Original company: London & South Western Railway

Other information
- External links: Departures; Facilities
- Coordinates: 51.4611°N 0.2162°W

Putney railway station serves Putney in the London Borough of Wandsworth, in southwest London straddling London fare zone 2 and 3. It is 5 miles 72 chains (9.5 km) down the line from London Waterloo.

The station and all trains serving it are operated by South Western Railway. It has four platforms and is 500 metres (1,600 ft) from East Putney Underground station.

== History ==
The station opened when the Nine Elms to Richmond line came into service on 27 July 1846 and was rebuilt in 1885-6 when the track was turned to quadruple as today, as far as Barnes.

== Services ==
All services at Putney are operated by South Western Railway.

The typical off-peak service in trains per hour is:

- 6 tph to London Waterloo (2 of these run semi-fast and 4 call at all stations)
- 2 tph to Teddington via Richmond, returning to London Waterloo via Kingston and Wimbledon
- 2 tph to Weybridge via Hounslow
- 2 tph to Windsor & Eton Riverside

Additional services call at the station during the peak hours.

Preceding station	National Rail	Following station
Wandsworth Town	South Western Railway Hounslow Loop Line	Barnes
Wandsworth Town	South Western Railway Kingston Loop Line	Barnes
Clapham Junction	South Western Railway Waterloo to Reading Line	Richmond

== Connections ==
London Buses route 14, 37, 39, 85, 93, 337, 424 and 430 and night route N74 serve the station.

Preceding station	National Rail	Following station
Wandsworth Town	South Western Railway; Hounslow Loop Line	Barnes
Wandsworth Town	South Western Railway; Kingston Loop Line	Barnes
Clapham Junction	South Western Railway; Waterloo to Windsor	Richmond
