= Putney to Wimbledon line =

Railway line between Putney and Wimbledon

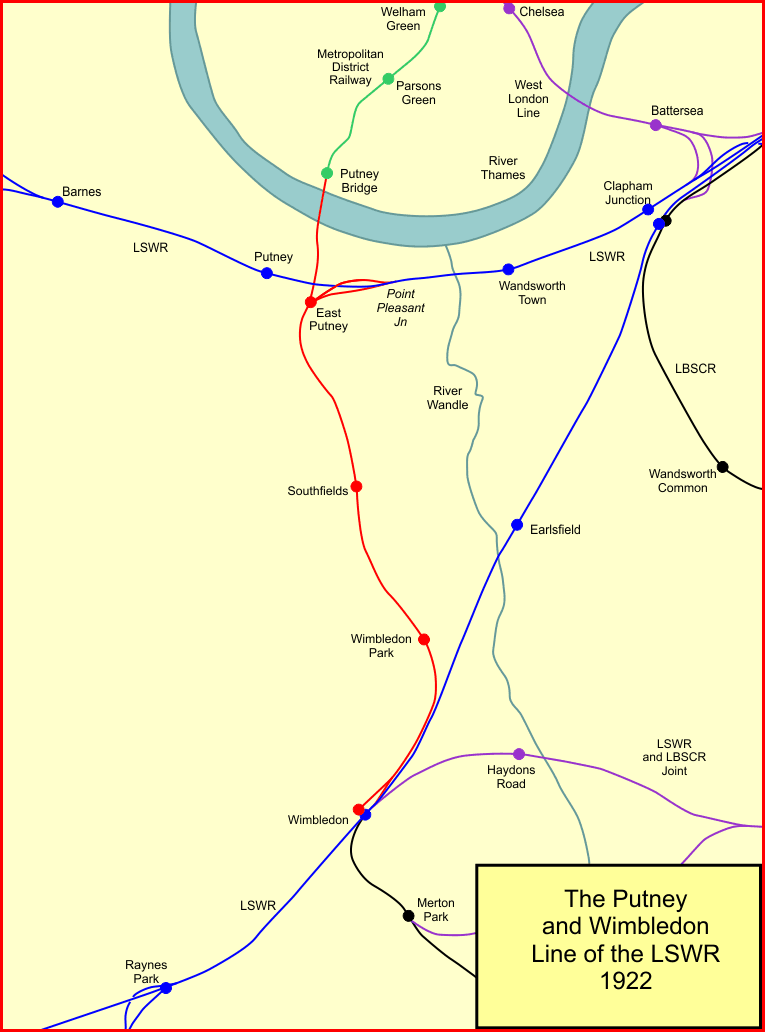
Map of the Putney to Wimbledon line

The Putney and Wimbledon line is a short railway route in south-west London. It was built by the London and South Western Railway as a collaborative arrangement with the Metropolitan District Railway. It was opened in 1889. The LSWR constructed Fulham Railway Bridge, although that was only ever used by District Railway trains. A spur connection from East Putney to the line from Barnes to Waterloo was used by LSWR trains.

The line was electrified for the District Railway trains in 1905, and the LSWR adopted the electrical system for its own trains on the line in 1916. The electrification proved very successful for the District Railway, although LSWR results were disappointing. In the first years of the twentieth century rapid residential development was stimulated alongside the line, and in the 1920s and 1930s this accelerated considerably, especially in the vicinity of the stations.

Use of the line by the LSWR and its successors has declined, and is limited to empty stock trains and occasional special excursions, but the District Line, as successor to the District Railway, continues in busy use.

== History ==
=== Rival schemes ===
On 1 March 1880 the Metropolitan District Railway opened a line from West Brompton to a station in Fulham, named Putney Bridge and Fulham. The District did this through a nominally independent company called the Fulham Extension Railway. The alignment of the terminus made it obvious that the next step was to bridge the Thames and strike south.

The District company was contemplating the southward extension when a projected company calling itself the Guildford, Kingston and London Railway promoted the possibility of an independent line from Guildford through Surbiton and Kingston to Fulham. The promoters hoped to obtain running powers from there through the District Railway line to the City of London. This would have been in direct competition with the established routes of the LSWR; in addition the proposal presumed outer suburban main line steam trains mingling with the District Railway’s own traffic through the tunnels from Earl’s Court to Mansion House. Both the LSWR and the District Railway were violently against this, and they joined forces to oppose it.

The scheme was considered in Parliament in the 1881 session. As part of the opposition tactics, the LSWR presented an alternative scheme for a new railway from Guildford to Surbiton only, joining its own network at that point. It was the LSWR that emerged successfully, and on 22 August 1881 its proposal was authorised; the LSWR line opened as the New Guildford Line in 1885.

Wimbledon and West Metropolitan Junction Railway Act 1882
- Act of Parliament
- Parliament of the United Kingdom
- Long title: An Act for making a Railway between Wimbledon and Putney in the county of Surrey.
- Citation: 45 & 46 Vict. c. ccl

Dates
- Royal assent: 18 August 1882

Text of statute as originally enacted

The Kingston company was still active and was proposing a shorter line from Surbiton to Putney Bridge, but the District and LSWR managed to kill that off, and secured an act of Parliament, the South-western Railway Act 1882 (45 & 46 Vict. c. ccxi), of 18 August 1882 which dissolved the Kingston scheme. However the Putney to Surbiton route was still authorised, now to be built by the LSWR and the District together. Another act of Parliament of the same date, the Wimbledon and West Metropolitan Junction Railway Act 1882 (45 & 46 Vict. c. ccl), authorised the Wimbledon and West Metropolitan Junction Railway; this was promoted by disappointed residents of Wimbledon in reaction to the abandonment of the Kingston line. It was to meet the intended Kingston line route a little to the south of Putney and run to Wimbledon; it too was reluctantly sponsored by the District and LSWR.

=== Joint usage proposed ===
With an unwanted railway authorised, and money in short supply, a resolution emerged, in that the Kingston line was finally abandoned, and the short section at Putney required by the Wimbledon line was incorporated into that line's authorisation, by the South Western Railway Act 1886 (49 & 50 Vict. c. cx) of 25 June 1886. Only the LSWR had the financial resources to build the line, so the whole project was passed into LSWR control. The termination at Wimbledon had been planned to cross the LSWR main line and join the Tooting line, but this was made more rational by arranging to run to terminal platforms on the north side of the LSWR station, with a junction for through trains. Mutual running powers existed, for the District to run to Wimbledon and for the LSWR to run to High Street Kensington or South Kensington. The LSWR would have had to make its own terminus at South Kensington due to the lack of space at the District station there, but in fact it never exercised its running powers and never built the station.

The South Western Railway Act 1886 formalised a number of agreements, including the abandonment of the Wimbledon and West Metropolitan Junction Railway scheme. The act also confirmed final abandonment of the Kingston line, and authorised the diversion at Wimbledon. The LSWR could work the finished lines alone or jointly with the District. The District was to run at least twenty passenger and coaching trains daily to Wimbledon, with the LSWR paying the running expenses and local passengers having indiscriminate use of both companies' trains.

LSWR shareholders were told on 11 August 1886 that the District "will not have any line of railway south of the Thames: the bridge will be ours; we shall join them at Fulham, and from that, including the bridge, will be bona fide South Western property". Works started in 1887; the bridge was the River Thames Fulham railway bridge at Putney; it had five spans of 153 feet (47 m) between cylinder centres and with 22 feet 6 inches (6.86 m) headway at high water. It was begun in April 1887, and completed by April 1889.

=== Opening for traffic ===
The Wimbledon station was described as the "North Station"; it had two new platforms with a central engine release road, and a separate booking office adjacent to the LSWR's platform 1. The line between Wimbledon and Fulham opened on 3 June 1889, with intermediate stations at Wimbledon Park, Southfields and East Putney, served only by District trains from Whitechapel. Thirty-one trains worked each way daily to the City, operated by the District's characteristic Beyer-Peacock 4–4–0T locomotives and trains of 4-wheeled coaches. LSWR trains started operating on 1 July 1889 between Wimbledon and Waterloo via the Putney Junction line, and therefore did not cross the river bridge.

=== Putney Junction lines ===
To link the Richmond line at Point Pleasant Junction with the Fulham to Wimbledon line at East Putney Junction, the Putney Junction lines opened on 1 July 1889. As authorised on 10 August 1882, both up and down lines were to have diverged from the Richmond line to the north, and then crossed high over that line turning south to join the Wimbledon line. The Richmond line was becoming congested, however, and quadrupling of it necessitated a grade-separated junction from Point Pleasant; the down line diverged on the south side to reach East Putney Junction. The change of plan was made within existing limits of deviation and no specific powers were taken, but Major-General Hutchinson on his inspection for the Board of Trade said that if doubts arose, formal powers should be obtained in a future act of Parliament. It seems was never done.

The earlier half-hourly service of the District Railway had been enhanced to give a 15 minute frequency, and the addition of the LSWR trains on 1 July 1889 added 12 LSWR trains daily each way between Wimbledon and Waterloo. These trains used the double junction with the main lines at the London end of Wimbledon station, and ran to the main station there.

== Revenue ==
The District Railway found the new line very lucrative: Wimbledon generated a high proportion of first-class tickets. The District Railway chairman, J. S. Forbes, was able to say in 1896 that the line had increased the company's receipts by over 44% in six years.

== Electrification ==
=== District Railway ===
By 1899 the District Railway was working 47 trains a day each way, while the LSWR supplied 15 trains to and from Waterloo. The District electrified its line at 600 V DC third and fourth rail, as far as Putney Bridge on 23 July 1905; those trains worked to and from High Street Kensington. The District Railway wished to extend their operation to Wimbledon, and agreement was reached on 4 December 1903 for the LSWR to electrify its tracks in return for District payments of interest on the capital cost. District Railway electric working through to Wimbledon started on 27 August 1905, giving a significant increase in service frequency, most trains running through to East Ham.

=== LSWR ===
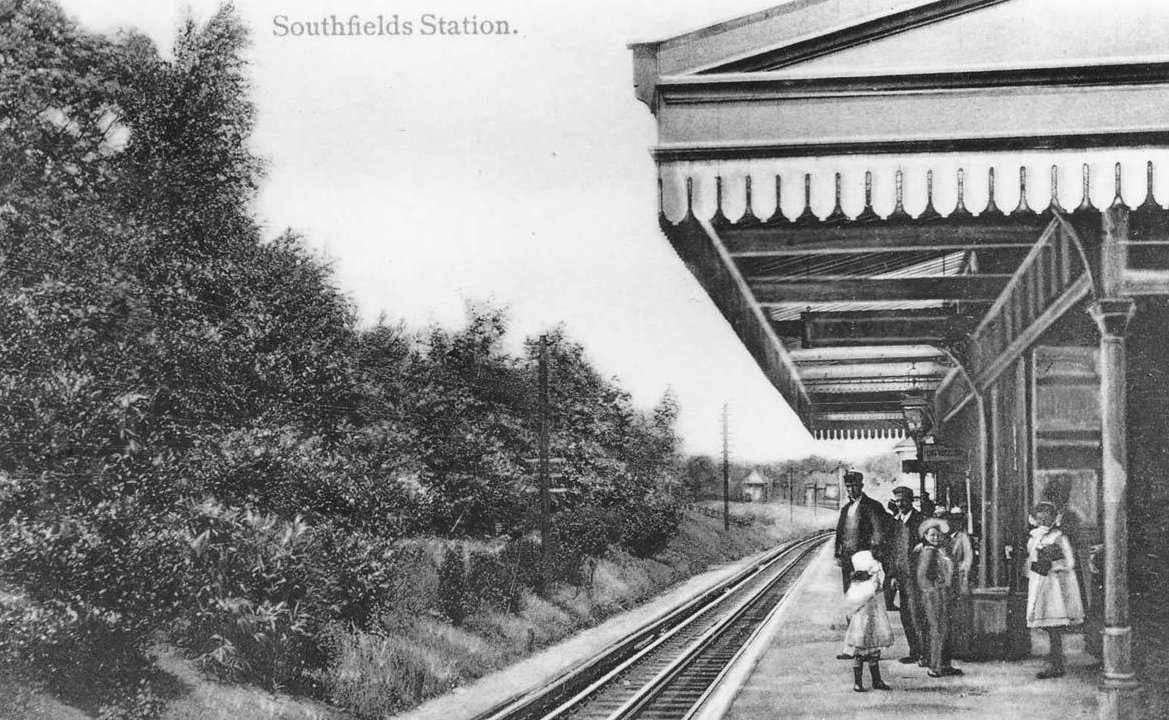
Third and fourth rail at Southfields station

The LSWR decided to install electric traction in large areas of its suburban district, and the first line treated was from Waterloo to Wimbledon via East Putney. The District Railway used 600 V DC, so for compatibility the LSWR adopted that voltage. The District trains used a third and fourth rail, whereas the LSWR trains used a third rail only. To enable interoperability the fourth rail was electrically bonded to the running rails. A special isolating section was installed on the river crossing to prevent bridging of the section gap by the bus-lines of passing trains. The LSWR electric operation started on 25 October 1915 on weekdays only; there was a twenty-minute frequency, but patronage was very poor, and the service was soon considerably reduced.

== Growth of traffic ==
There were 103 trains each way daily on the line in 1904, the last full year of steam operation on the District line to Wimbledon; about half were District workings. By 1911 the total had grown to 157, of which 93 were District. The route was operated by mechanical signalling, and it was at capacity. New intermediate signal boxes were opened at Cromer Road (Southfields) and Revelstoke Road (Wimbledon Park) to shorten the sections. The LSWR was in the habit of delaying District Railway trains during very busy times such as race days while the crowds cleared the stations. In 1911 there were 19 race days, and 85 District trains had to be cancelled. Meanwhile the District was carrying traffic which had increased by 76% since 1907.

The LSWR as owner of the route was under pressure to quadruple the line, and in fact this was authorised by the Metropolitan District Railway Act 1912. The LSWR would carry out the work, providing a western pair of tracks for the District's exclusive use; Wimbledon station would also be enlarged. However no work on the widening had been done before the conditions of World War I made a start impossible, although an extra terminal platform was provided at the Wimbledon North station by the LSWR. From 9 March 1914 the District operated a ten-minute all-day service to Wimbledon, increased to six minutes at rush hours.

In the period from 1910 very heavy growth of suburban housing took place alongside the line, especially around the stations which acted as local centres. The incorporation of the line into the early LSWR electrification scheme encouraged interest in settling in the locality. This was the first part of the LSWR electrification to open, providing a 20-minute frequency on weekdays only from 25 October 1915 between Wimbledon and Waterloo via Wandsworth Town. Although frequency and journey time were excellent, patronage was poor, and in July 1919 when stock was required to augment busier electric services, all trains were withdrawn except for about half a dozen rush-hour workings, that missed calls between Wimbledon Park and East Putney inclusive, reaching Waterloo in 19 minutes.

When regular electric working was resumed on 16 November 1919, trains ran only hourly (half-hourly at peak periods), and even with the low frequency, three-car sets were sufficient for the loading. The line occupation by these and the various freight and empty stock workings caused no great distress to the District, and the urgency was removed from the quadrupling plan. The powers were allowed to lapse, but when rebuilding Wimbledon station in 1929, the Southern Railway (as successor from 1923 to the LSWR) did provide a new four-bay station for the District with its own concourse below the main booking hall.

After 1945 the Southern Region of British Railways, itself a successor to the Southern Railway, no longer made calls at Wimbledon Park, Southfields and East Putney. Steam-hauled freight and empty stock remained commonplace until the early 1960s. Through the 1950s and early 1960s, some fast electric services came this way, usually from the Alton line, and running non-stop between Surbiton and Waterloo. Summer Channel Islands boat trains also worked via East Putney every year from 1953 to 1962 and it was one of these, in the latter year, which formed the last ordinary steam passenger working on the line.

== Signalling characteristics ==
For many years London Transport drivers working south of West Brompton faced violent contrasts in signalling. Manually worked semaphore signals on the District's own line had been converted to electro-pneumatic automatic working with track circuits and train stops at the time of electrification, and were subsequently replaced by colour light signals on the same system. From East Putney to Wimbledon the line retained its Victorian manual signalling with Sykes lock-and-block working. In foggy weather Underground drivers had the unusual experience of guidance from manually-placed detonators on the rails. It was not until 1970 that the line was fully equipped with colour light signals.

== Up Point Pleasant Spur closed ==
The connection between East Putney and Point Pleasant Junction was built as a grade-separated junction. Bridges on the up line became structurally defective and it was closed on 4 April 1987, leaving the down line only. Infrastructure alterations were made to enable the remaining down line spur to be used bi-directionally, and this was brought into reversible use on 11 February 1991.

== Present day ==
There was an anomaly that the line and stations were controlled by the main line operator and infrastructure owner, while all the local passenger trains on the line were operated by the District Line. Station operation was transferred to London Transport, later London Underground, from 1 April 1994. Currently (2023) there is a limited traffic of empty stock trains between Wimbledon Carriage Sidings and Waterloo. The dominant traffic on the line is the District Line service of London Underground Ltd.

== Locations ==
- Putney Bridge; District Railway station; District Railway station, opened 1 March 1880; still open;
- Fulham Railway Bridge;
- East Putney; opened 3 June 1889; Southern Railway usage ended 5 May 1941; still open for District Line trains;
- Southfields; opened 3 June 1889; still open;
- Wimbledon Park; opened 3 June 1889; still open;
- Wimbledon; relocated main station opened by LSWR 21 November 1881; North station opened 3 June 1889; incorporated into main station 1929; still open.
