= Putney station =

Putney station may refer to:

- Putney Bridge tube station
- Putney railway station
- East Putney tube station
