= Eastside City Park =

Small park in central Birmingham, England

Coordinates: 52.4820°N 1.8877°W

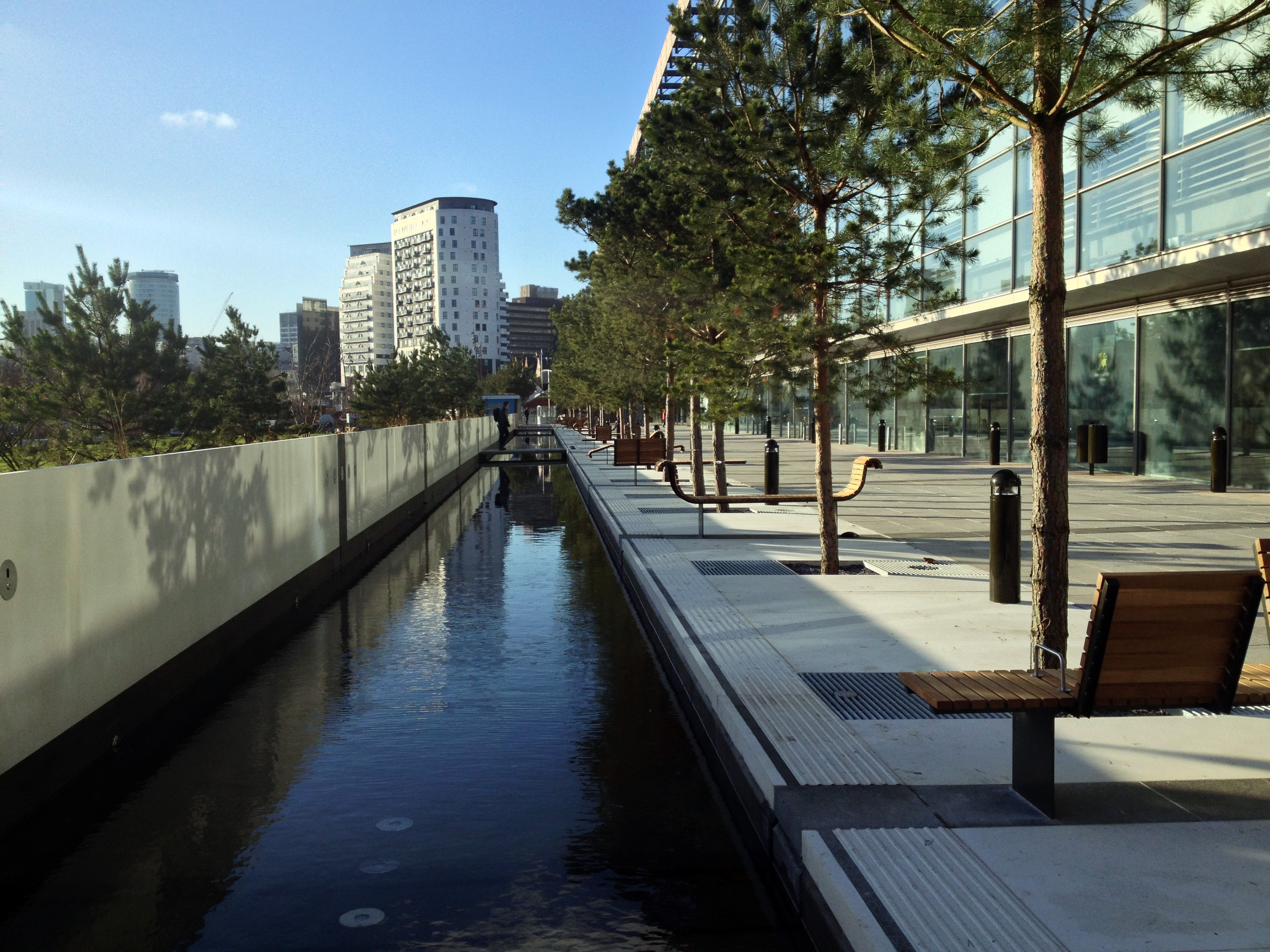
- Interactive map of Eastside City Park
- Type: Urban park
- Location: Curzon Street, Birmingham, England
- Area: 6.75 acres (2.73 ha)
- Created: 2011—2012
- Designer: Patel Taylor and Allain Provost
- Operator: Birmingham City Council
- Open: 16 March 2013
- Status: Open
- Awards: ICE West Midlands - Sustainability Award - 2013; BCI - Regeneration Award - 2013

Eastside City Park is a 6.75 acre (2.73 ha) urban park located in the Eastside district of Birmingham City Centre. Designed by architects Patel taylor with landscape architect Allain Provost, the park was opened to the public on 5 December 2012 at a cost of £11.75 million. Lining the frontage of Millennium Point, the park provides 14,300 square metres of landscaped green space, 310 trees, a 110 metres (360 ft) canal water feature and a public square incorporating 21 jet fountains.

== History ==
In 2004, discussions began with the Commission for Architecture and the Built Environment (CABE), outlining the preliminary processes regarding the development of the site.

A May 2007 Big Lottery Fund request was filed for £25million, but was rejected in October of the same year. Birmingham City Council later pledged £5million to begin the project.

== Location ==
The Eastside City Park runs from the remaining portion of Park Street Gardens, northwards past the Masshouse development where and in an easterly direction along Curzon Street, past Curzon Street railway station and Millennium Point; the park terminates at the front of Birmingham City University's "Parkside" campus building.

== Development ==
The park was designed by Architects Patel Taylor with French Landscape Architect Allain Provost who gained commission for the project in 2006. Development of the park commenced in August 2011 by contractors Wates. The park partially opened to the public on 5 December 2012 and officially opened on 16 March 2013.

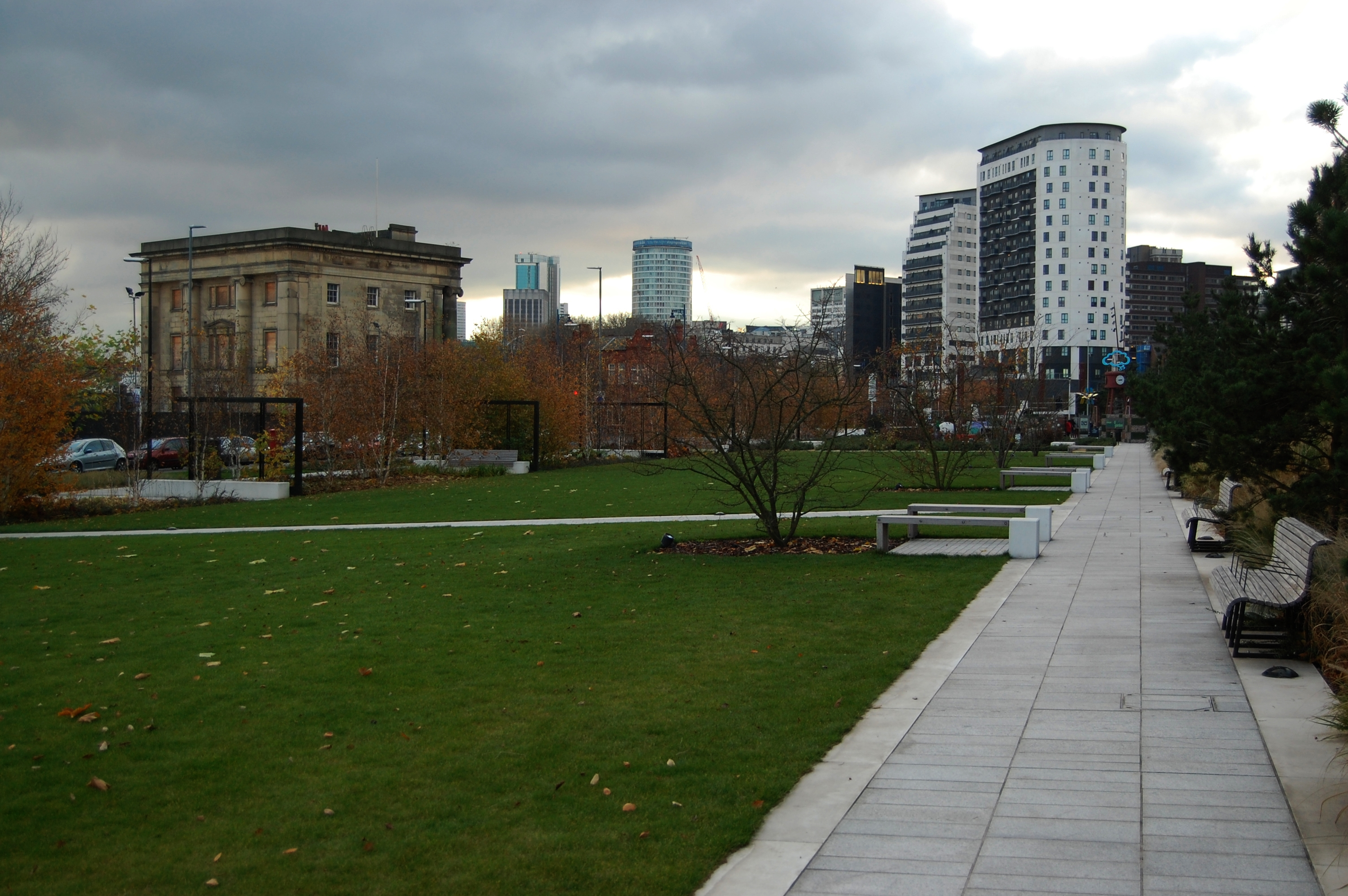
The park in 2013

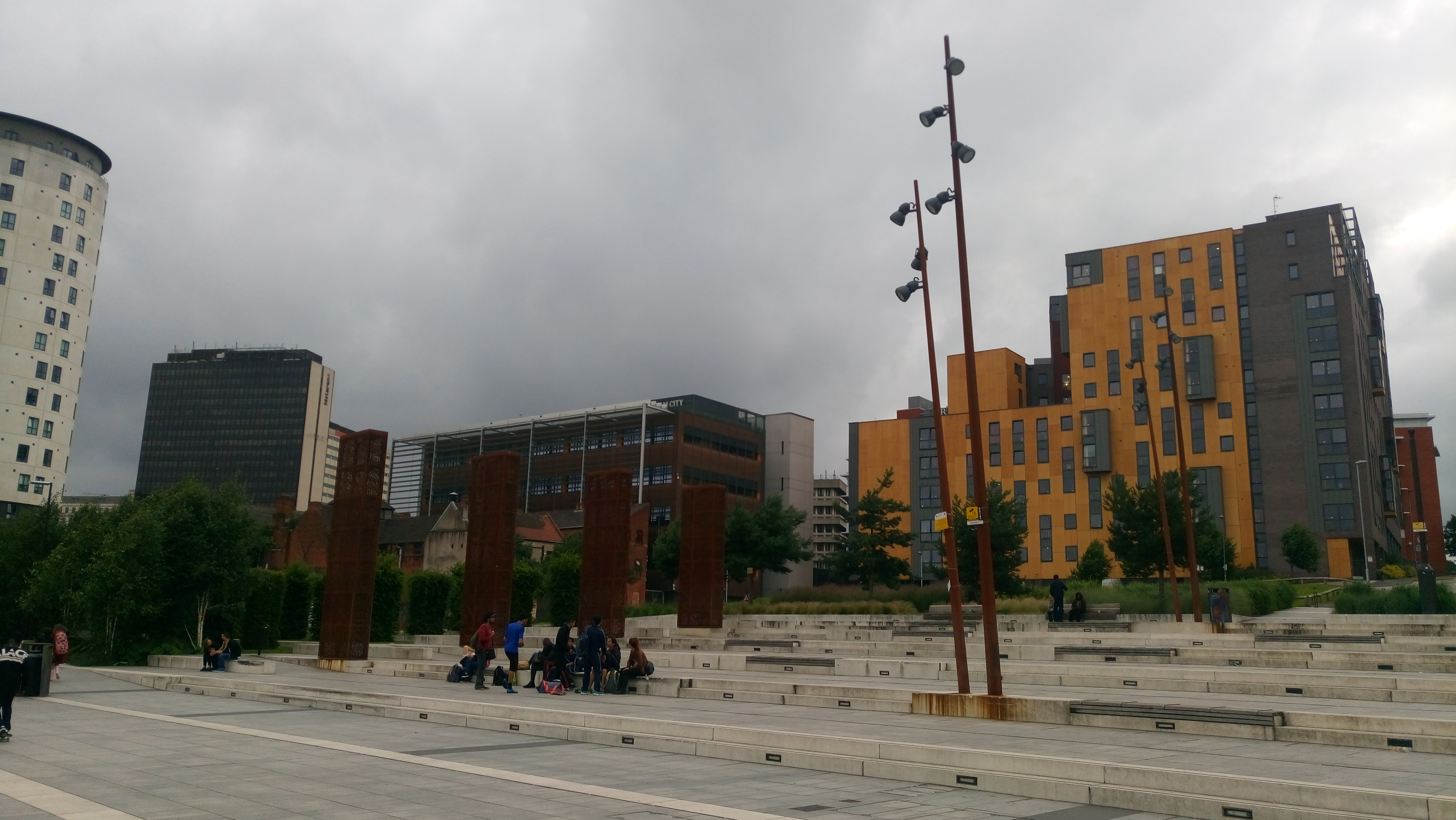
Steel sculptures in the park, 2016
