= Patel Taylor =

Architectural practice

Practice information
- Founded: 1989

Significant works and honors
- Awards: Placemaking Awards 2015 Masterplanning & Public Realm Architect of the Year 2013

Website
- www.pateltaylor.co.uk

Patel Taylor is an architectural practice based in Clerkenwell, London. Placemaking defines its work. It operates from studios in Rawstorne Street, in an old warehouse converted by the firm in 2011.

== History ==
Patel Taylor was founded by Pankaj Patel and Andrew Taylor in 1989 and specialises in fusing together elements of architecture, landscape and urban design. It has completed projects throughout the United Kingdom and in mainland Europe. Collaborations with French landscape architect Allain Provost have produced the award-winning Eastside City Park and Thames Barrier Park.

Patel Taylor is working on some of the largest regeneration schemes in the UK, such as London Dock in Wapping and White City in West London. These developments are of the scale of city quarters, they create new mixed-use pieces of the capital, drawing on the grain that characterises London. The practice has completed a variety of major UK projects, such as the London Olympic Athletes’ Village, the award-winning Eastside City Park in Birmingham and the critically acclaimed Courtyard Housing in the Borough of Barking and Dagenham.

Patel Taylor's work often involves suggesting a framework that helps repair and reinforce a sense of place. Current and recent developments where this thinking is being applied include London Dock, White City, Earls Court, Wood Wharf, Southbank Place, Thames Barrier Park, Eastside City Park, Bow Schools and the multiple award winning Library & Student Centre at University of Essex.

The practice has received more than 40 design awards and was named Masterplanning and Public Realm Architect of the Year in the Building Design Awards 2013. Its 2017 Lombard Wharf residential tower in Battersea (London) was named Development of Outstanding Architectural Merit in the Evening Standard New Homes Awards 2018.

== People ==
There are more than 50 people currently working at the Clerkenwell offices of Patel Taylor.

The practice includes architects, urban designers, landscape architects, designers, model makers, as well as technical specialists.

=== Directors ===
- Andrew Taylor
- Pankaj Patel

== Projects ==
Projects include:

- Eastside City Park in Birmingham
- Athletes' Village Guidelines
- Athletes' Village Housing for the London 2012 Olympic Games.
- Albert Sloman Library and Silberrad Student Centre, University of Essex, Colchester (2015)
- The Athletes' Village, London
- Lowther Primary School, London
- Putney Wharf Tower, London
- In fill House, Camden, London
- University of Wales, Aberystwyth
- Orleans House Gallery, Twickenham
- Thames View Housing, Barking, London
- Stanley Mills, Stroud
- Bow Schools, London
- Portland College, Mansfield
- Benslow Music School, Hitchin
- Ivor Crewe Lecture Hall, University of Essex, Colchester (2007)
- Peace Park Pavilion, Leicestershire
- Ty Asaf Arts Centre, North Wales
- St Paul's School, London
- United Reformed Church, Richmond, London
- Thames Barrier Park Visitor Centre, London

=== Landscape ===
- Thames Barrier Park, London
- Eastside City Park, Birmingham
- Royal Victoria Square, London
- Bankside Walkway, London
- Canary Wharf Footbridges, London
- Sneinton Market Square, Nottingham
- Putney Wharf Riverside, Putney, London
- Short Blue Place, Barking, London

=== Urban design ===
- Springfield Hospital Grounds, London
- Reims Cultural Quarter, Reims, France
- Athletes Village Guidelines, London
- Woolston Riverside, Southampton
- Ayr Citadel, Ayr
- Wembley Masterplan, London

== Awards ==
The practice has won 10 RIBA Awards, and 7 Civic Trust Awards as well as many others.
