= Thames Barrier Park =

Park in Silvertown, London

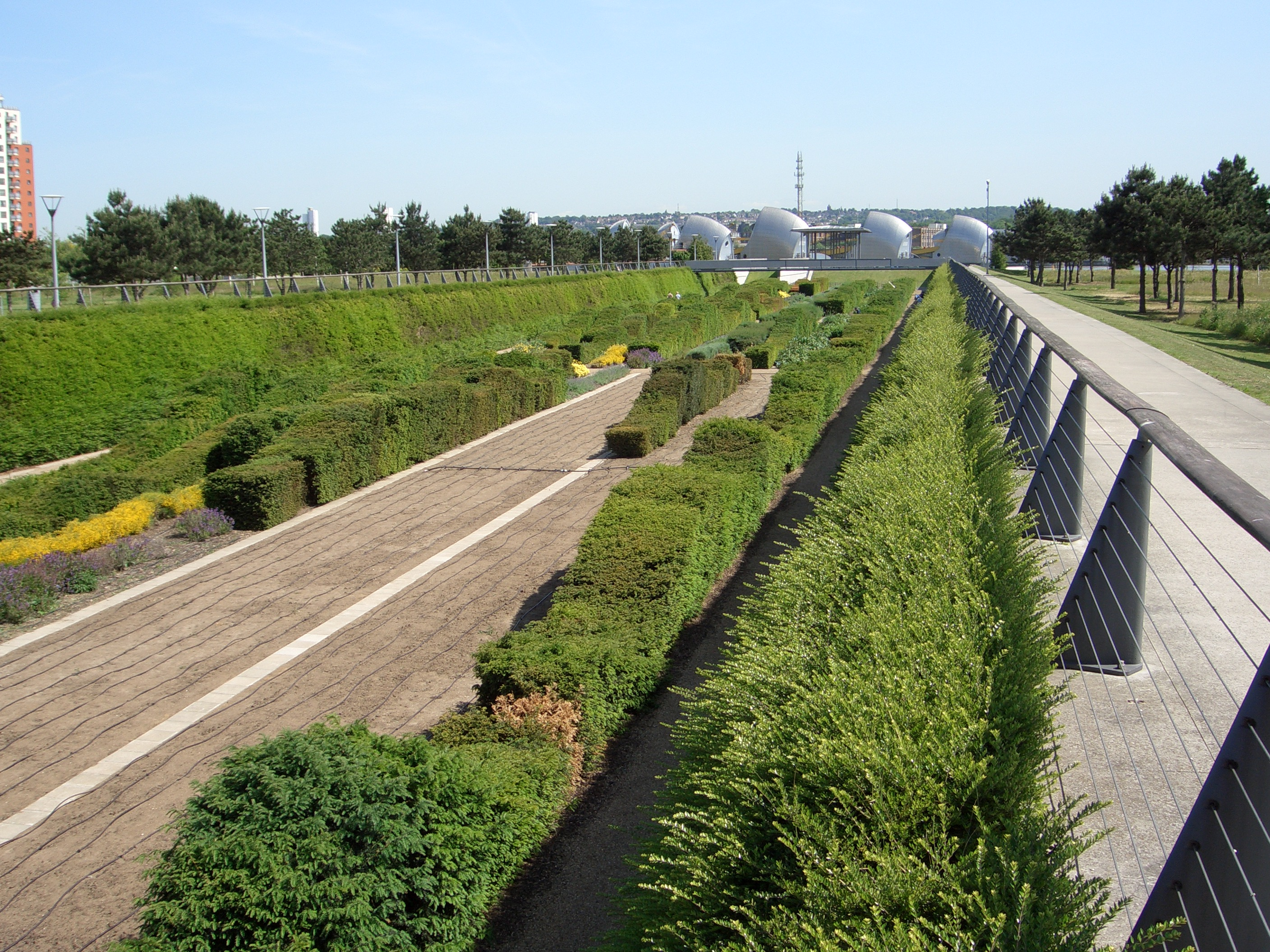
- Looking across the park's sunken garden towards the Thames Barrier.

- Location within London Borough of Newham
- Type: Public park
- Location: Newham, Greater London, England
- Coordinates: 51°30′3″N 0°2′3″E
- Area: 7 acres (2.8 ha)
- Created: November 2000; 25 years ago
- Operator: Greater London Authority
- Status: Open year round

The Thames Barrier Park is a 7-hectare (17.3-acre) park in Silvertown in the London Borough of Newham and is named after its location on the north side of the River Thames next to the Thames Barrier. It is intended to aid the regeneration of the area by creating an attractive public space alongside residential and commercial developments. It is adjacent to Pontoon Dock DLR station.

Allain Provost and Alain Cousseran of Groupe Signes with Patel Taylor won the international competition to design the park in 1995. As the first largely post-modern design in London, the park has a fresh modern look with adventurous planting and dancing water fountains.

The site was built on what was one of the country's most polluted sites, the former PRChemicals factory. Decontaminating the site took many years.
