= Putney Wharf Tower =

Apartment building at Putney, London

Coordinates: 51.465408°N 0.213203°W

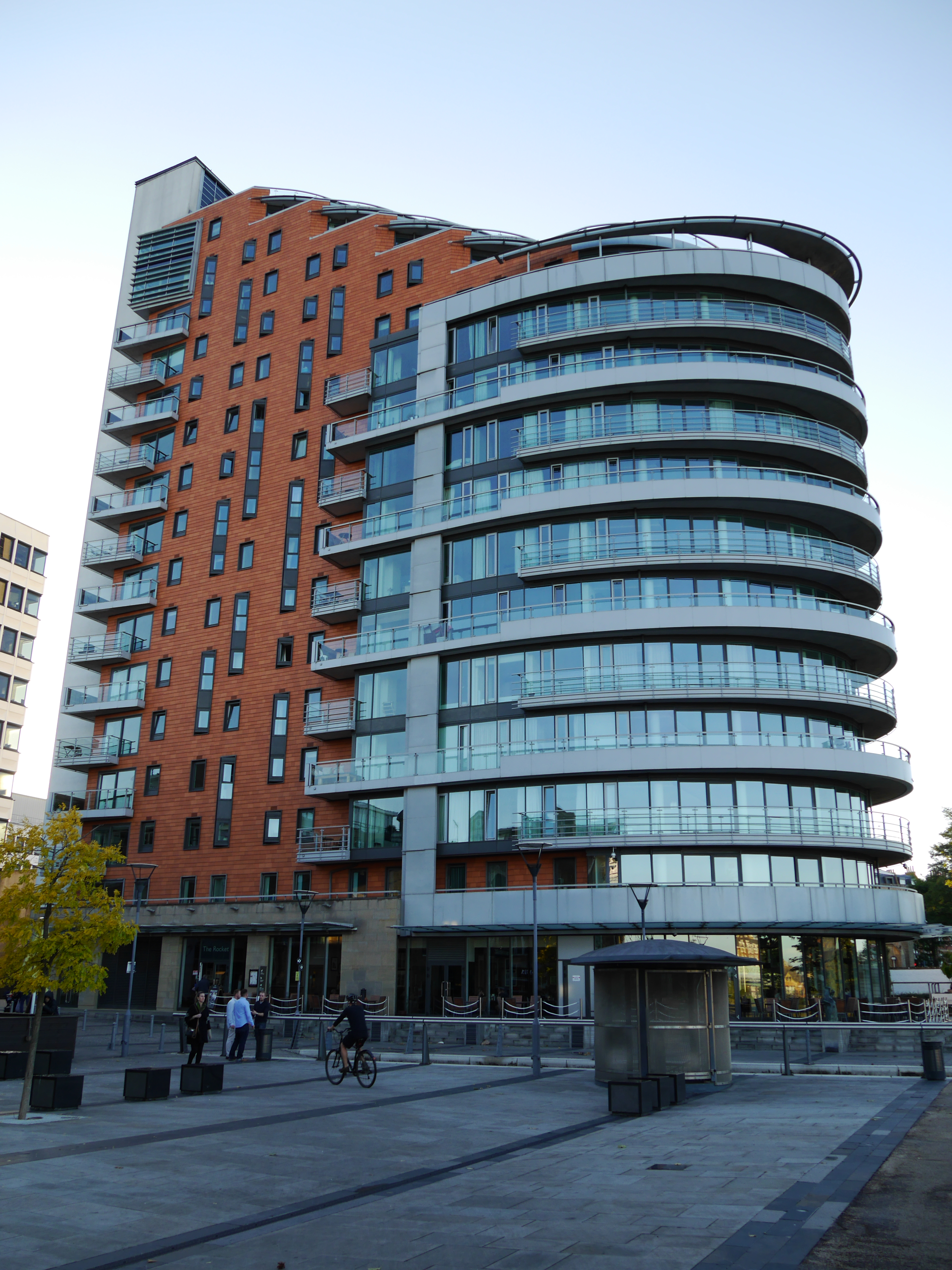
Putney Wharf Tower

Putney Wharf Tower is a tall apartment building at Putney Wharf, Putney, London SW15 2JX, on the river Thames, close to Putney Bridge.

It was originally a 1960s office block for International Computers Limited (ICL), until the fifteen stories was reclad in 2003 and redeveloped for residential use by Patel Taylor and St George. It was built with a restaurant/bar, The Rocket on the ground floor, which was later taken over by the Wetherspoons pub chain.

A curved riverside extension, terracotta cladding and an extra four floors were added to the 1960s block to create a block of 67 two and three bed apartments.

Either side of the tower on the riverside are two squares, Church square with St Mary's Church and Putney Wharf Piazza with The Boathouse pub, the tower lies within the Putney Embankment Conservation Area.
