= Putney Bridge =

Bridge in London, England

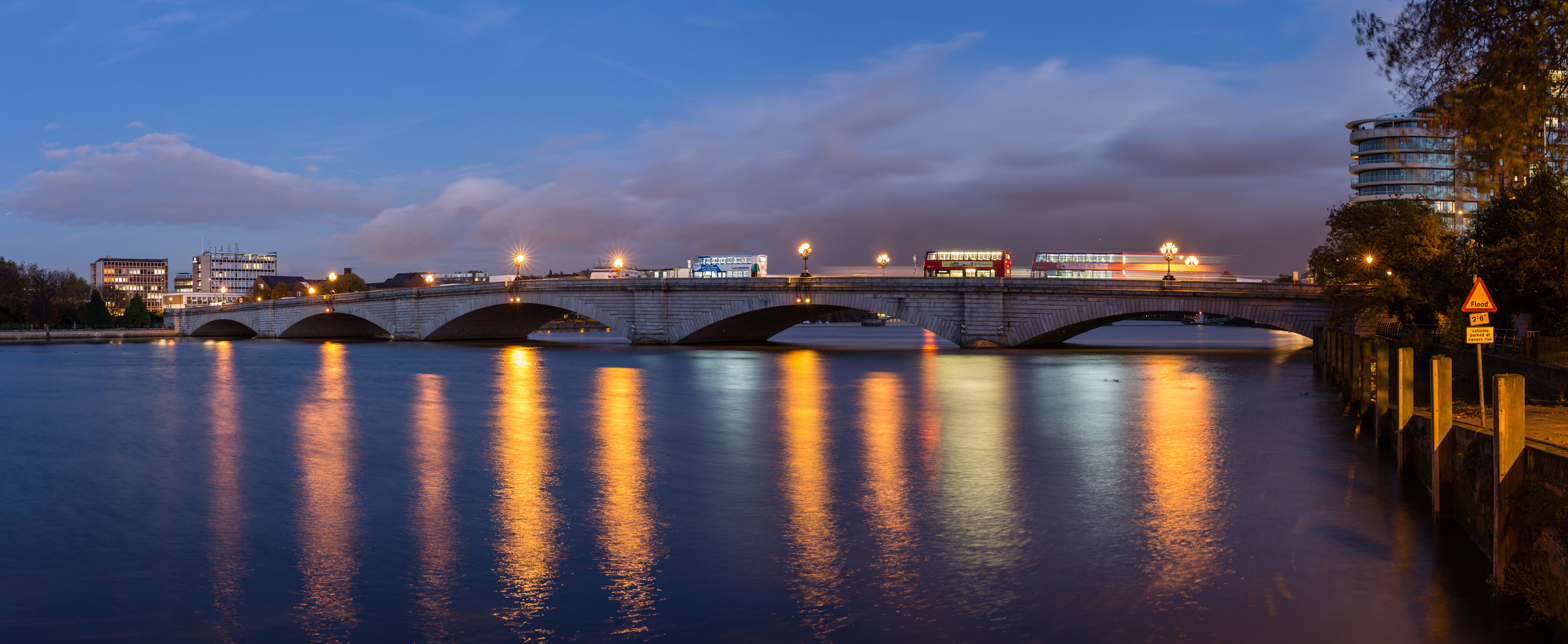
- Coordinates: 51°28′00″N 0°12′48″W
- Carries: A219 road
- Crosses: River Thames
- Locale: London, England
- Maintained by: Wandsworth London Borough Council
- Preceded by: Hammersmith Bridge
- Followed by: Fulham Railway Bridge

Characteristics
- Design: Arch bridge
- Total length: 700 feet (210 m)
- Width: 75 feet (23 m)

History
- Opened: 29 November 1729; 296 years ago (first bridge); 29 May 1886; 140 years ago (second bridge)

Statistics

Listed Building – Grade II
- Official name: Putney Bridge
- Designated: 7 April 1983; 43 years ago
- Reference no.: 1079799

Location
- Interactive map of Putney Bridge

Putney Bridge is a Grade II listed bridge over the River Thames in west London, linking Putney on the south side with Fulham to the north.

Before the first bridge on the site, known as Fulham Bridge, was built in 1729, a ferry had shuttled between the two banks.

The current format is three lanes southbound (including one bus lane) and one lane (plus cycle lane/bus stop) northbound. Putney High Street, a main approach, is part of a London hub for retail, offices, food, drink and entertainment. Putney Embankment hosts Putney Pier for riverboat services immediately south-west of the bridge as well as the capital's largest set of facilities in rowing. The Pier in the sport marks one end of the Championship Course.

== Position ==
The north side of the bridge is 120m west-southwest of Putney Bridge Underground station, which is in the park-sandwiched Hurlingham neighbourhood of Fulham. Parkland to the west includes the gardens of Fulham Palace, historic home of the Bishops of London. On the south side of the bridge is a rounded glass-prowed ship-shaped 21st-century building, Putney Wharf Tower, one of the tallest buildings in Putney.

The bridge has medieval parish churches beside its abutments: St Mary's Church, Putney is built on the south and All Saints Church, Fulham, on the north bank. This close proximity of two churches by a major river is rare, another example being at Goring-on-Thames and Streatley, villages hemmed in by the Chiltern Hills (the Goring Gap).

== History ==
=== First bridges ===
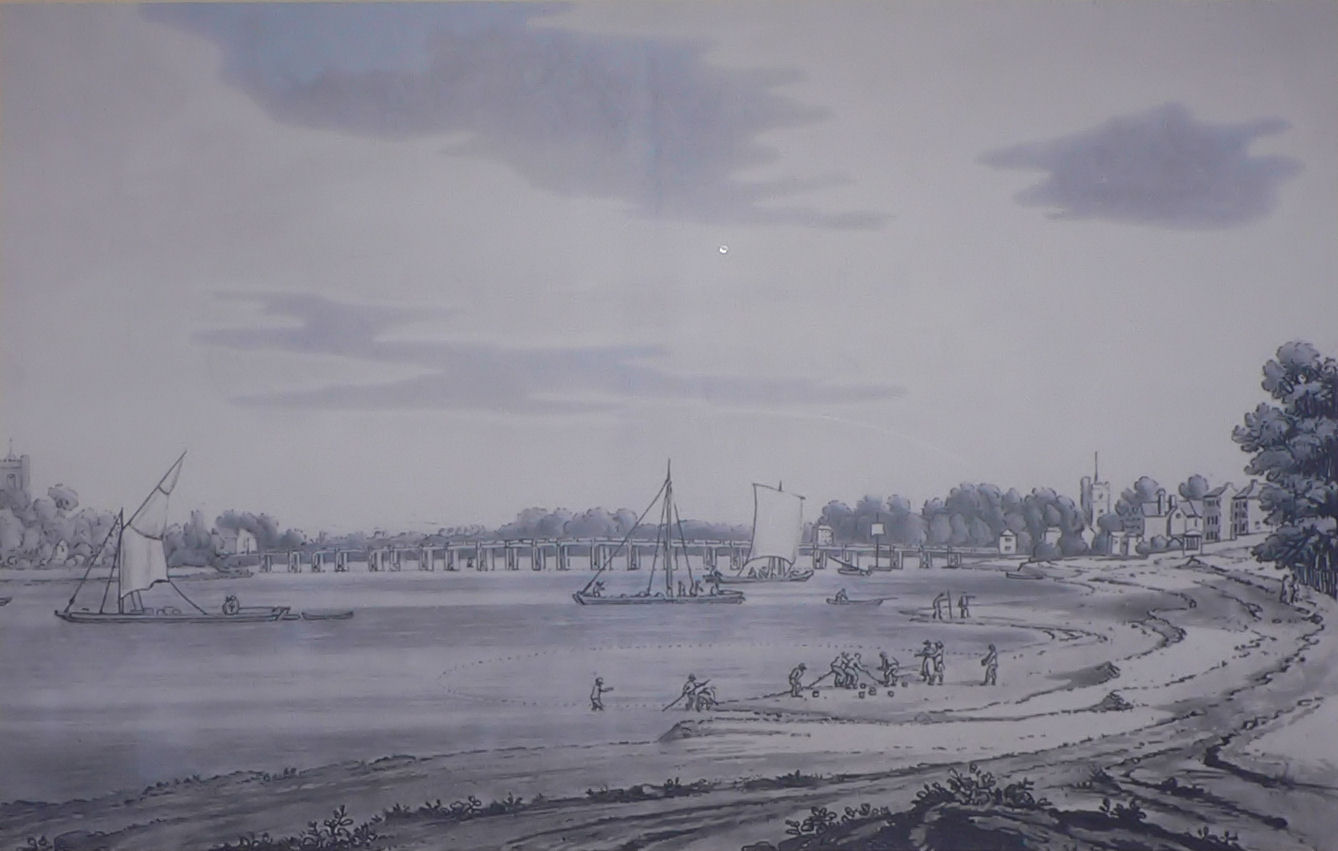
Putney Bridge, 1793, by J. Farington, a square-rigged 'West Country' barge, fishermen netting for salmon and erosion of the riverbank.

The first bridge of any kind between the two parishes of Fulham and Putney was built during the Civil War: after the Battle of Brentford in 1642, the Parliamentary forces built a bridge of boats between Fulham and Putney. According to an account from the period:

The Lord-Generall hath caused a bridge to be built upon barges and lighters over the Thames, between Fulham and Putney, to convey his army and artillery over into Surry, to follow the King's forces; and he hath ordered that forts shall be erected at each end thereof to guard it; but for the present the seamen, with long boats and shallops, full of ordnance and musketeers, lie there upon the river to secure it.

In 1720 Sir Robert Walpole (the following year considered the first Prime Minister) was returning from seeing George I at Kingston on Thames and being in a hurry to get to the House of Commons rode together with his servant to Putney to take the ferry across to Fulham. However, the ferrymen were drinking in The Swan Inn. The calls of Sir Robert and his servant went unanswered. Walpole, who was left to take a longer route to Parliament, seemed to be motivated by the experience to have a bridge built across the Thames between Fulham and Putney.

Fulham and Putney Bridge Act 1725
- Act of Parliament
- Parliament of Great Britain
- Long title: An Act for building a Bridge cross the River of Thames, from the Town of Fulham, in the County of Middlesex, to the Town of Putney, in the County of Surrey.
- Citation: 12 Geo. 1. c. 36
- Territorial extent: Great Britain

Dates
- Royal assent: 24 May 1726
- Commencement: 20 January 1726 (Note: Start of session.)
- Repealed: 28 July 1863
Other legislation
| Amended by | Fulham Bridge Act 1727 |
| Repealed by | Putney and Fulham Bridge Act 1863 |

Status: Repealed

Text of statute as originally enacted

Fulham Bridge Act 1727
- Act of Parliament
- Parliament of Great Britain
- Long title: An Act to explain and amend an Act made in the Twelfth Year of the Reign of His late Majesty King George the First, for building a Bridge cross the River of Thames, from the Town of Fulham, in the County of Middlesex, to the Town of Putney, in the County of Surrey; and for making the said Act more effectual.
- Citation: 1 Geo. 2. St. 2. c. 18
- Territorial extent: Great Britain

Dates
- Royal assent: 28 May 1728
- Commencement: 23 January 1728
- Repealed: 28 July 1863
Other legislation
| Amends | Fulham and Putney Bridge Act 1725 |
| Repealed by | Putney and Fulham Bridge Act 1863 |

Status: Repealed

Text of statute as originally enacted

The statutory framework for construction of a bridge was provided by the Fulham and Putney Bridge Act 1725 (12 Geo. 1. c. 36). Built by local master carpenter Thomas Phillips to a design by Royal Navy surveyor Sir Jacob Ackworth, the first bridge was opened on 29 November 1729. In its first guise, from 1729 to 1886, it was commonly known as Fulham Bridge and on a different alignment: the footings on the north bank aligned with Fulham High Street.

It was the only bridge between London Bridge and Kingston Bridge at the time. It was a toll bridge with tollbooths at either end of the timber-built structure.

In October 1795, Mary Wollstonecraft, philosopher and early women's equality advocate, allegedly planned to commit suicide by jumping from the bridge, because she had returned from a trip to Sweden to discover that her lover was involved with an actress from London.

The bridge was the starting point for The Boat Race from 1845 until the new iron aqueduct was built just upstream in 1856, after which this became the starting point. The competitors are currently 32 male rowers, plus a cox for each eight, representing the universities of Oxford and Cambridge with two crews of first and second eights. Women's eights competed in an equivalent race for the first time in 2015, having since 1927 competed a shorter varsity race in Henley also in the early spring.

The bridge was badly damaged by the collision of a river barge in 1870. Although part of the bridge was subsequently replaced, the entire bridge was then demolished to make way for construction of the current bridge. The iron aqueduct was also demolished as the new bridge carried the water in pipes beneath the road surface.

=== Current bridge ===
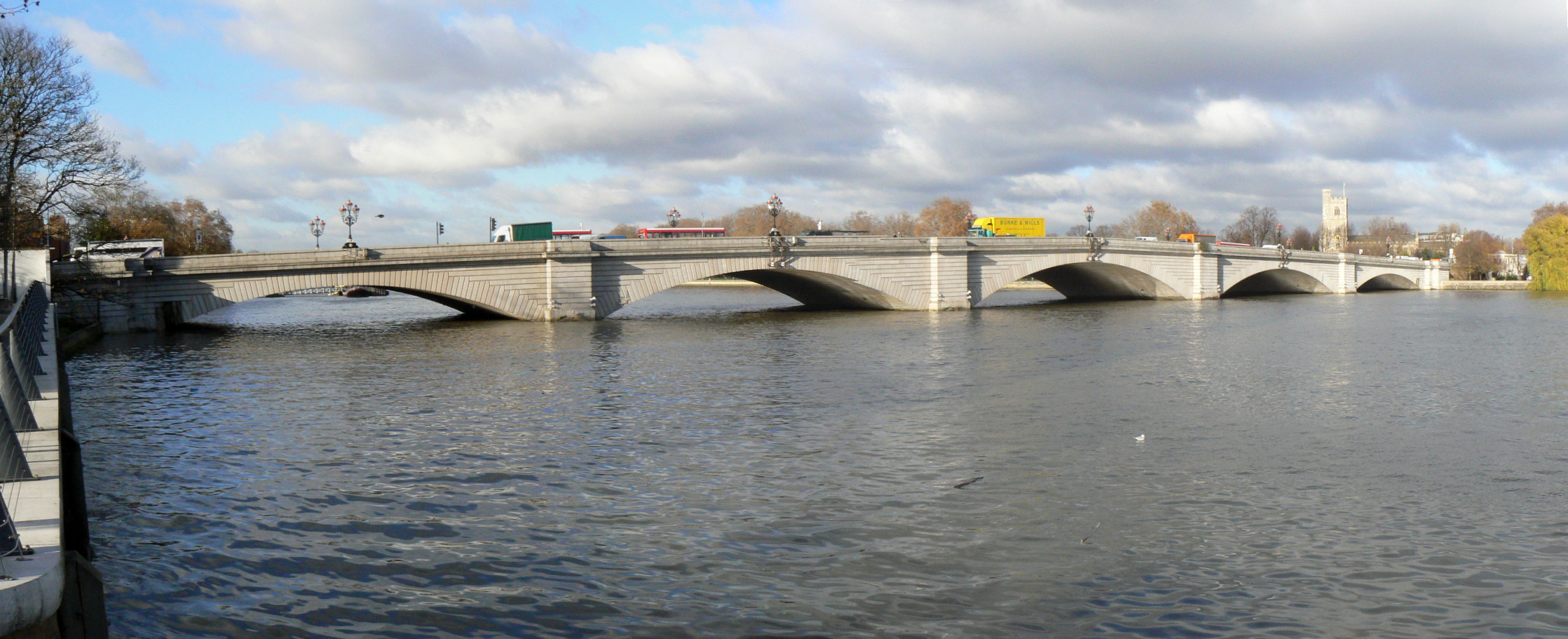
Putney Bridge looking upstream

The Metropolitan Board of Works purchased the bridge in 1879, discontinued the tolls in 1880, and set about its replacement.

In 1886 construction of the stone bridge that stands today, on a new alignment, was completed. A new road – Putney Bridge Approach – was laid to connect the northern end of the new bridge with Fulham High Street at its junction with New King's Road. In consequence the southernmost stretch of Fulham High Street was effectively reduced to a cul-de-sac, ending at the water's edge.

The new Putney Bridge was designed by civil engineer Sir Joseph Bazalgette as a five-span structure, built of stone and Cornish granite. Bazalgette also designed London's sewerage system, and the bridge integrates two of his five outfall sewers running perpendicular to it. It was constructed by John Waddell of Edinburgh, whose tender of £240,433 (equivalent to £25,007,162 in 2025) was accepted on 15 April 1882. It is 700 ft (210 m) long and 43 ft (13 m) wide, and was opened by the Prince (later King Edward VII) and Princess of Wales on 29 May 1886. In 1933, the bridge was widened to its present three carriageways. Putney Bridge Approach was widened in consequence, further encroaching on the churchyard of All Saints Church, Fulham.

At the bases of the bridge's lamp posts is a heraldic composition made up of seven coats of arms. In the centre is the royal coat of arms of Queen Victoria which is surrounded by six others, representing the area of the Metropolitan Board of Works, from top clockwise the coats of arms of the Borough of Guildford (representing the county of Surrey), the City of Westminster, the Borough of Colchester (representing the County of Essex), the County of Middlesex, the City of London, and the County of Kent. This motif also appears at the ends of Hammersmith Bridge, the next bridge upstream.

The stone marking the downstream end of the Championship Course is used for all boat races through Putney in Olympic-class rowing boats. These include the Wingfield Sculls and the UK's main Head of the River Races, just west of the bridge, rather than at the bridge itself, under which the centre of its middle arch would provide an advantage if starting underneath it, as all races are competed with the tide.

In 2007, the bridge suffered considerable damage by a developer who cut several holes into the Cornish granite of the southern approach of the bridge.

On 14 July 2014, Putney Bridge was closed for three months, except to pedestrians and dismounted cyclists, to undergo "essential repairs" by Wandsworth Council "to better protect the bridge from damage caused by water penetration, which has contributed to the poor road surface". The bridge reopened on 26 September that year.

==== Putney Pusher ====
On 5 May 2017, an unidentified jogger on the bridge pushed a woman in the path of an approaching bus, which narrowly avoided hitting her. A 44-year-old man was arrested in June 2026 on suspicion of attempted grievous bodily harm. Irish playwright Sonya Kelly wrote a play, Once Upon a Bridge, inspired by the incident which was produced by Druid Theatre in 2021.

== See also ==
- Crossings of the River Thames
- Putney Bridge tube station
- List of bridges in London
