= Fulham Railway Bridge =

Truss bridge that crosses the River Thames in London

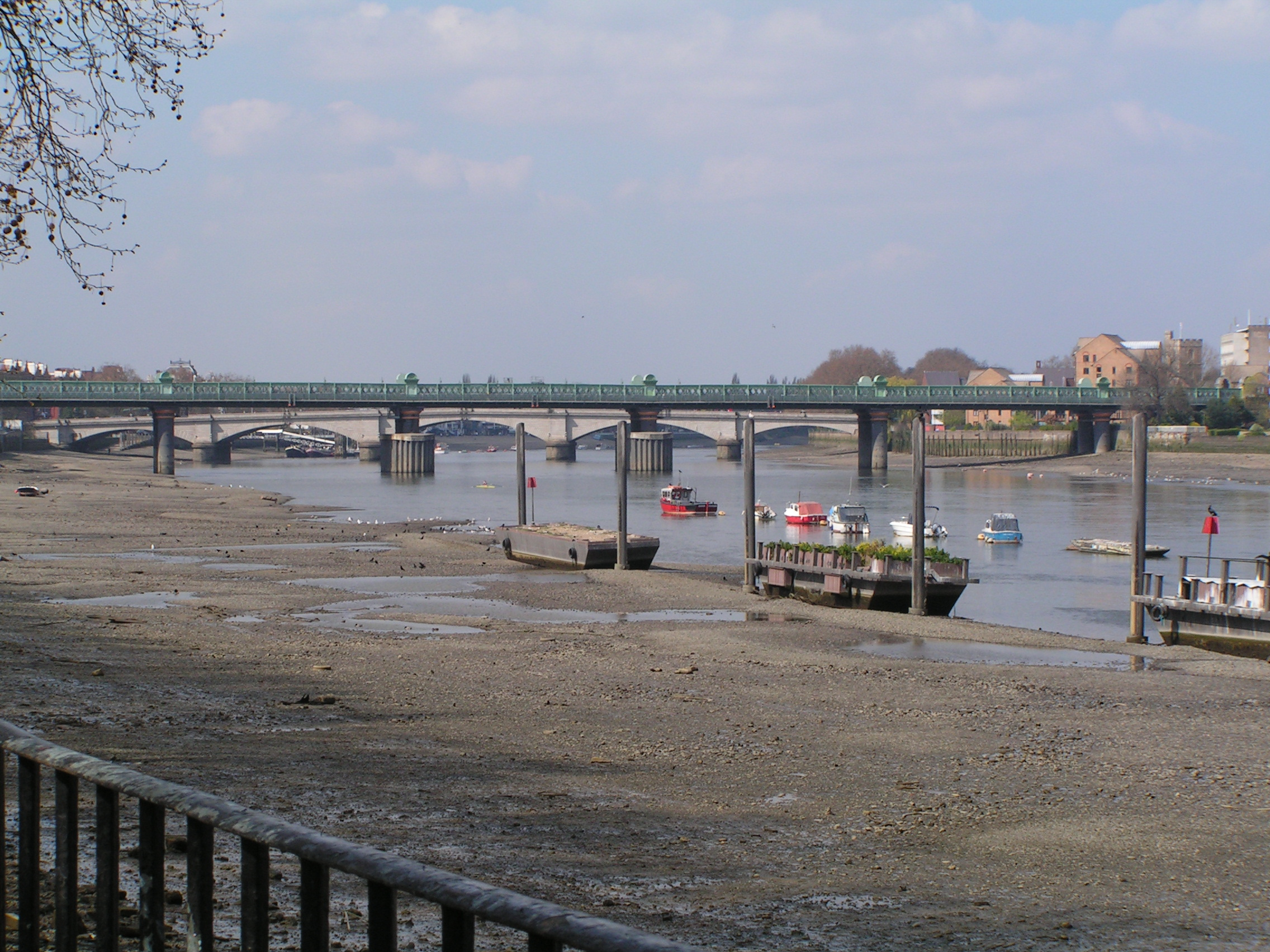
- Fulham Railway Bridge at low tide
- Coordinates: 51°27′57″N 0°12′35″W
- Carries: District line Pedestrians
- Crosses: River Thames
- Locale: London, England
- Maintained by: Network Rail
- Preceded by: Putney Bridge
- Followed by: Wandsworth Bridge

Characteristics
- Design: Girder bridge

History
- Opened: 3 June 1889; 137 years ago

Location
- Interactive map of Fulham Railway Bridge

Fulham Railway Bridge crosses the River Thames in London. It is very close to Putney Bridge, and carries the London Underground District line between Putney Bridge station on the North, and East Putney station on the South. Fulham Railway Bridge can also be crossed on foot, on the downstream (east) side.

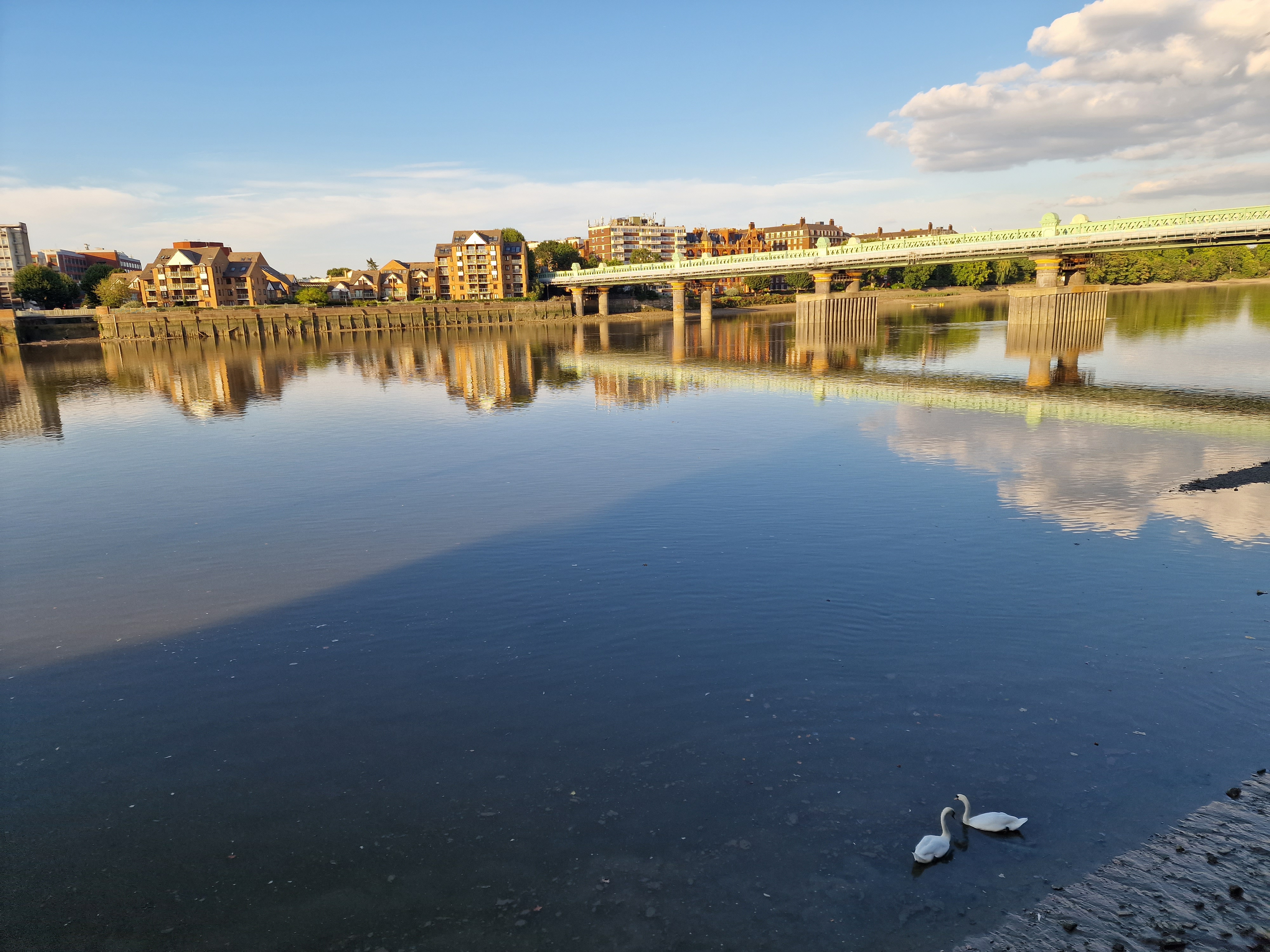
Swans in front of the bridge

Originally referred to by its design engineers W. H. Thomas and William Jacomb as Putney Railway Bridge (which it is still sometimes called) it has no official name, but for over a hundred years it has been known colloquially as "The Iron Bridge".

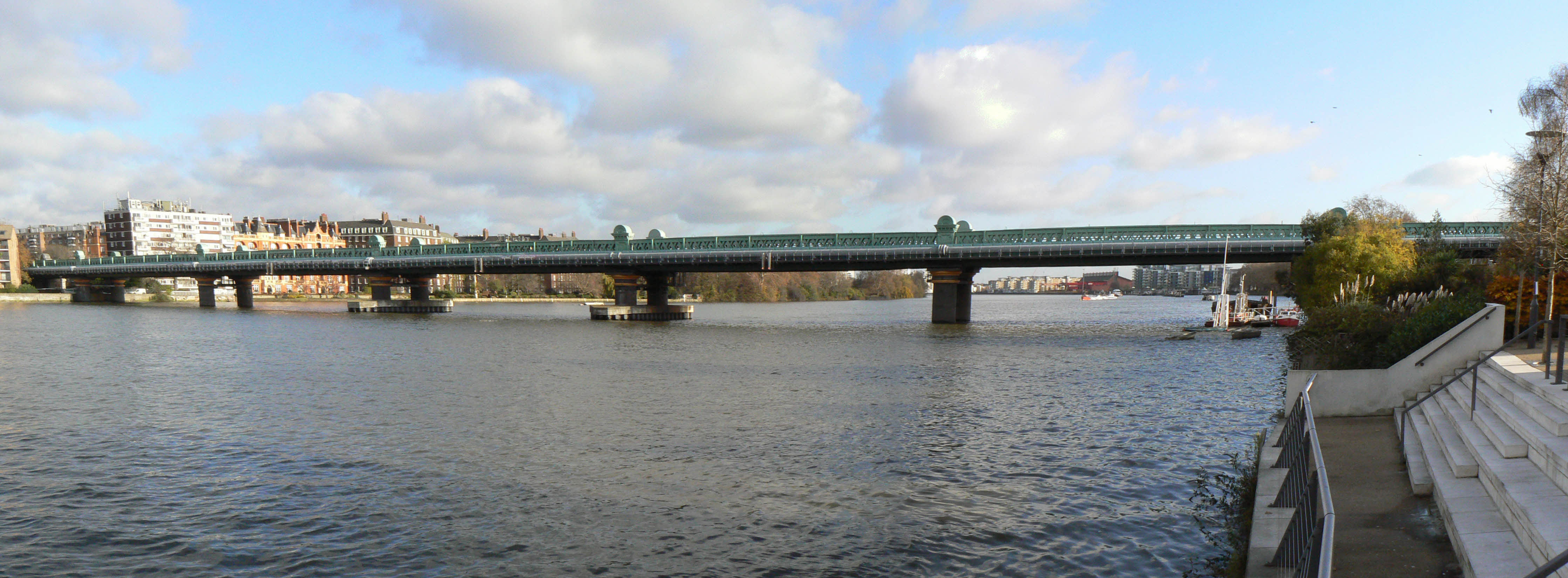
Panorama of Fulham Railway Bridge looking downstream

== History ==
The bridge is of lattice girder construction and 418 metres (1,371 ft) long, with 5 spans totalling 301 metres (988 ft) actually across the river, two further spans on the southern shore, and one on the north. It was designed for the London and South Western Railway by Brunel's former assistant William Jacomb, built by Head Wrightson and opened in 1889.

It was refurbished between 1995 and 1997 for the London Underground by Tilbury Douglas, and it was at that time that a plaque bearing the erroneous title Fulham Railway Bridge was attached to the pillar at the top of the pedestrian stairway on the Putney (Southern) downstream side of the bridge.

== See also ==
- Crossings of the River Thames
- List of lattice girder bridges in the United Kingdom
- List of bridges in London
