= Allain Provost =

French landscape architect

Allain Provost is a French landscape architect. His works include designs for the Parc Floral in the Bois de Vincennes, Paris, Parc André Citroën in Paris, the Jardin Diderot at La Défense, La Courneuve Park (1972–2000) in Seine-Saint-Denis, Ile-de-France, the Eurotunnel in Calais (1987), the Technocentre Renault, Guyancourt (1992–2000), the reconstruction of the castle gardens of Villarceaux (1994–1999), and the Thames Barrier Park, London (1995–2000), constructed in conjunction with London architectural firm Patel Taylor. He was a jury member on the Father Collins Park design competition in Dublin in 2003. He established the Groupe Signe in 1990 with another landscape architect Alain Cousseran.

== Biography ==
After studying Agricultural engineering and then landscape architecture at the École nationale supérieure du paysage, Allain Provost began his career in the early 1960s.
