= Putney Bridge tube station =

London Underground station

Putney Bridge
- Interactive map of Putney Bridge

General information
- Location: Fulham
- Local authority: London Borough of Hammersmith and Fulham
- Managed by: London Underground
- Number of platforms: 2
- Fare zone: 2

London Underground annual entry and exit
- 2021: ▲2.69 million
- 2022: ▲4.81 million
- 2023: ▲5.01 million
- 2024: ▼4.74 million
- 2025: ▼4.55 million

Railway companies
- Original company: District Railway

Key dates
- 1 March 1880: Opened as Putney Bridge & Fulham; terminus of line
- 3 June 1889: Line extended to Wimbledon
- 1 September 1902: Renamed Putney Bridge & Hurlingham
- 1932: Renamed Putney Bridge

Other information
- External links: TfL station info page
- Coordinates: 51.4682917°N 0.208750°W

Putney Bridge (/ˈpʌtni ˈbrɪdʒ/) is a London Underground station on the Wimbledon branch of the District line. It is between Parsons Green and East Putney stations and is in London fare zone 2. The station is located in the south of Fulham, adjacent to Fulham High Street and New Kings Road (A308) and is a short distance from the north end of Putney Bridge from which it takes its name.

== History ==
The station was opened on 1 March 1880 as Putney Bridge & Fulham when the District Railway (DR, now the District line) extended its line south from West Brompton. The station served as the terminus of the line until 1889 when the DR built Fulham Railway Bridge across the River Thames and extended the line south to the London and South Western Railway's (L&SWR's) newly built East Putney station where it connected to the L&SWR's new line to Wimbledon. Services from the station to Wimbledon began on 3 June 1889. The station has an ornate yellow brick façade at the entrance.

On 1 September 1902, the station was renamed Putney Bridge & Hurlingham referring to its proximity to Hurlingham Park and the Hurlingham Club. It received its current name in 1932. Despite taking its name from Putney Bridge, the tube station is in fact on the Fulham side of the Thames and is not actually located in Putney.

== Nearby places of interest ==
A World War II pillbox can clearly be seen at the Southern end of the Southbound platform, overlooking Fulham Railway Bridge. The concrete pillbox was built in 1940 as a final line of defense should German troops invade London. It was designed like a fortified look-out post with narrow loopholes (rather like a castle) to protect the inhabitant while allowing them to shoot at intruders.

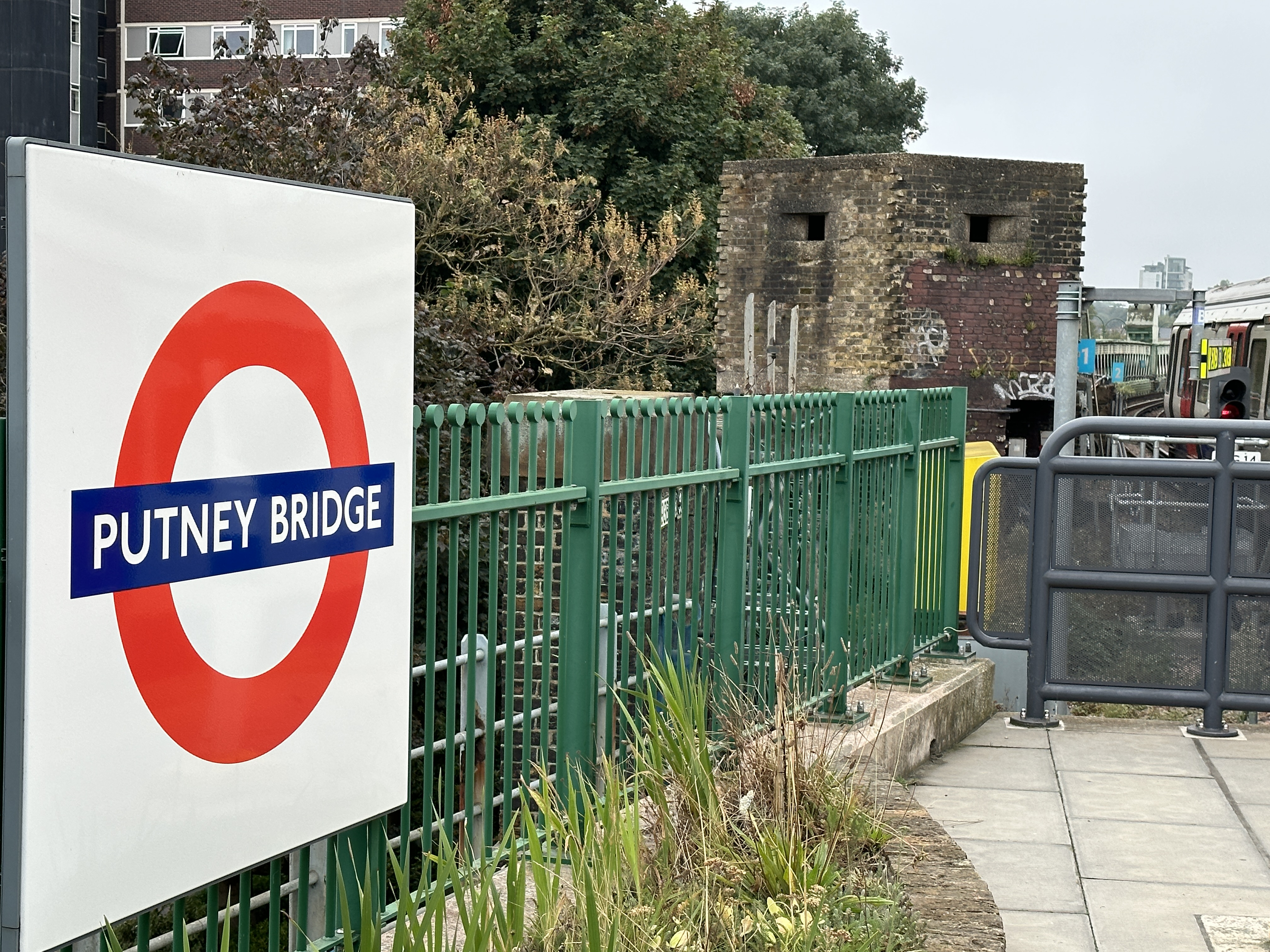
World War II pillbox located at Putney Bridge

In addition to the Hurlingham club and Hurlingham Park, the Grade I listed Fulham Palace and its restored garden, the former home of the Bishops of London, in Bishop's Park is nearby to the north and contains a small museum. The historic All Saints Church, Fulham and its graveyard are on the riverside route to Fulham Palace.

Fulham Football Club's Craven Cottage stadium is about 1 kilometre to the north-west and the tube station is often very busy on matchdays.

== Recent developments ==
Putney Bridge had a bay platform (platform 2) which could only accommodate C stock trains and was located between the current eastbound and westbound tracks. After the C stock was removed from service in June 2014, the bay platform ceased to be used, and the track was lifted as of October 2015.

This platform was brought back into use in May 2016. The previous terminating end is now joined to the westbound track and platform 3 is no longer in use and is fenced off. This eliminated the previous 10 mph speed restriction on the westbound side.

== Connections ==
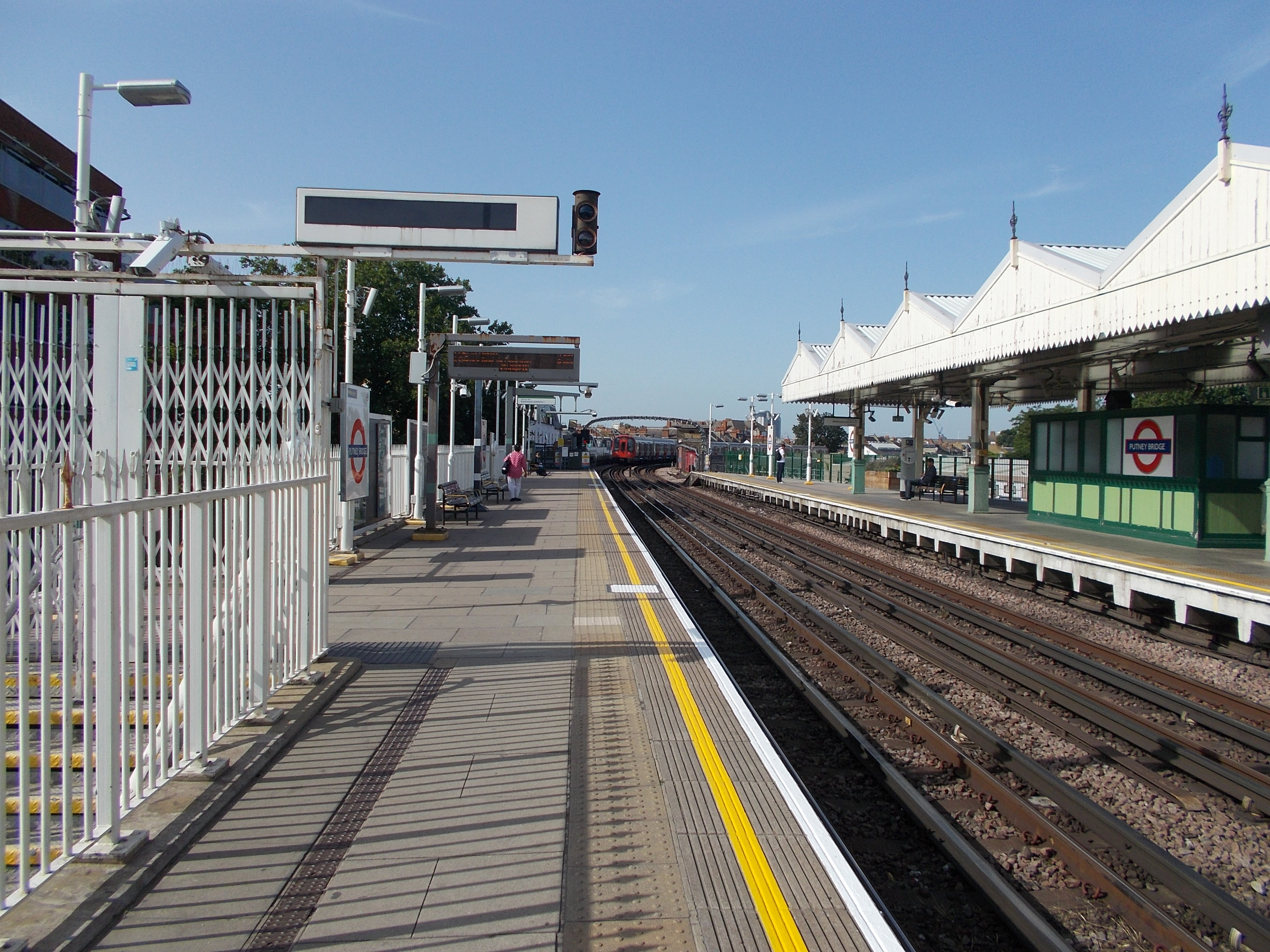
Northbound platform

London Buses routes 14, 22, 39, 85, 93, 74, 220, 265, 270, 378, 424, 430 and night routes N22, N33, N72 and N74 serve the station.

Preceding station	London Underground	Following station
East Putney towards Wimbledon	District line Wimbledon branch	Parsons Green towards Edgware Road or Upminster
