= St Joseph Church, Roehampton =

Coordinates: 51.449450°N 0.240075°W

St Joseph's Church
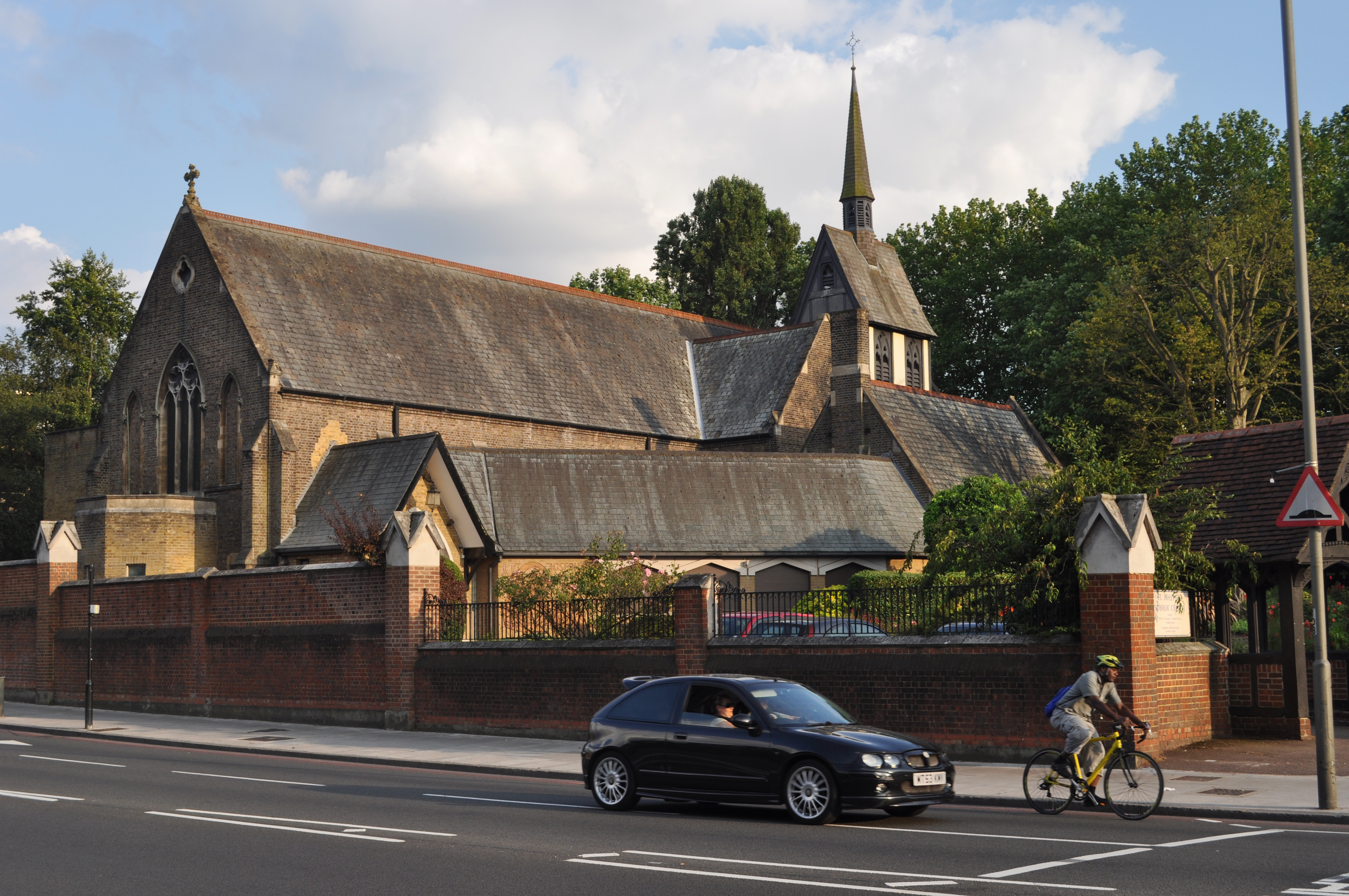
- St Joseph's Church viewed from Roehampton Lane

- Location in the London Borough of Wandsworth
- OS grid reference: TQ 22390 73742
- Location: Roehampton
- Country: England
- Denomination: Roman Catholic
- Website: StJosephRoehampton.org.uk

History
- Status: Active
- Founded: 1869
- Founder: Society of Jesus
- Dedication: Saint Joseph

Architecture
- Functional status: Parish church
- Architect: Frederick Walters
- Style: Gothic Revival
- Completed: 1881

Administration
- Province: Southwark
- Archdiocese: Southwark
- Deanery: Mortlake

St Joseph's Church is a Roman Catholic Parish church in Roehampton in the London Borough of Wandsworth. It was founded by the Jesuits in 1869 and designed by Frederick Walters. It is situated on the corner of Roehampton Lane and Medfield Street.

== History ==
The Jesuits arrived in Roehampton during the mid-nineteenth century and created a novitiate, Manresa House, which became Whitelands College, now part of the University of Roehampton. In 1869, they started a mission to the local Catholics in the area. In 1881, they decided to build a church that would permanently accommodate the congregation. They asked Frederick Walters to design the church for them. It was the first church he designed for the Jesuits and he would go on to design more buildings for them, such as Sacred Heart Church, Wimbledon, St Winefride Church, South Wimbledon and the chapel of Wimbledon College.

In 1948, the Jesuits left Manresa House and moved their novitiate to Harlaxton Manor. They also handed the administration of the church over to the Diocese of Southwark who continue to serve the parish.

In 1958, the church was extended and in 1998 it was re-ordered.

== Parish ==
The church has four Sunday Masses every week. They are at 6:00pm on Saturday evening, 9:00am and 11:00am on Sunday morning and 6:00pm on Sunday evening. There are weekday Masses at 10:00am on Monday, Tuesday and Saturday and 8:00am on Friday.

Within the parish is the Sacred Heart Primary School, established by the Society of the Sacred Heart.

== See also ==
- Society of Jesus
- Parkstead House
