= Arendrup =

Arendrup is a surname. Notable people with the surname include:

- Christian Henrik Arendrup (1837–1913), Governor-General of The Danish West Indies
- Edith Arendrup (1846–1934), English artist and religious sister
