= Christ the King Church, Wimbledon Park =

Coordinates: 51.434744°N 0.198409°W

Christ the King Church
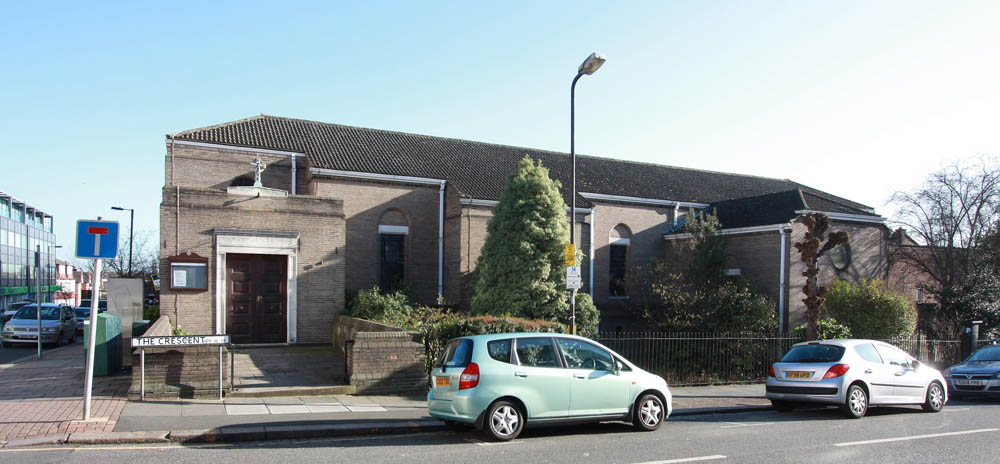
- Front entrance

- Location in the London Borough of Merton
- OS grid reference: TQ 25325 72177
- Location: Wimbledon Park
- Country: England
- Denomination: Roman Catholic
- Website: ChristTheKingParish.org.uk

History
- Status: Active
- Founded: 1913
- Founder: Society of Jesus
- Dedication: Christ the King

Architecture
- Functional status: Parish church
- Architect: Adrian Gilbert Scott
- Style: Italianate
- Groundbreaking: 1926
- Completed: 1928

Administration
- Province: Southwark
- Archdiocese: Southwark
- Deanery: Merton

Christ the King Church is a Roman Catholic Parish church in the Wimbledon Park area of Wimbledon in the London Borough of Merton. It was founded in 1913, and built in 1926 by the Society of Jesus. The architect was Adrian Gilbert Scott.

== History ==
In 1877, The Jesuits came to Wimbledon at the request of Edith Arendup, a member of the Courtauld family, from Roehampton where they had their novitiate, Manresa House. In 1887, she commissioned the building of Sacred Heart Church, Wimbledon. From that church the Jesuits ministered to the Catholics of the area. From 1913, Fr Ignatius O'Gorman SJ travelled to the Catholics in the Wimbledon Park area.

Originally, the rector of the Sacred Heart Church only allowed one Sunday Mass to be said in the area. In 1926, the rector and the Bishop of Southwark, Peter Amigo allowed for Fr O'Gorman to have the church built. Adrian Gilbert Scott designed the church and it was completed in 1928. The church, a chapel of ease of Sacred Heart Church was going to be dedicated to Saint Austin, but in 1925, Pope Pius XI instituted the Feast of Christ the King, so the church was dedicated to Christ the King. The church hall remained dedicated to St Austin.

In 1955, the church ceased to be a chapel of ease and became a parish church. The first parish priest was Fr Jordan SJ. In 1959, administration of the church was handed over by the Jesuits to the Diocese of Southwark who continue to serve the parish.

== Parish ==
The church has five Sunday Masses. One is at 6:00pm on Saturday evening, at 8:30am and 10:30am on Sunday morning and at 5:30pm on Sunday afternoon. There is also a Mass in Polish at 12:45pm every Sunday. There are weekday Masses at 9:30am from Monday to Saturday.

== Interior ==
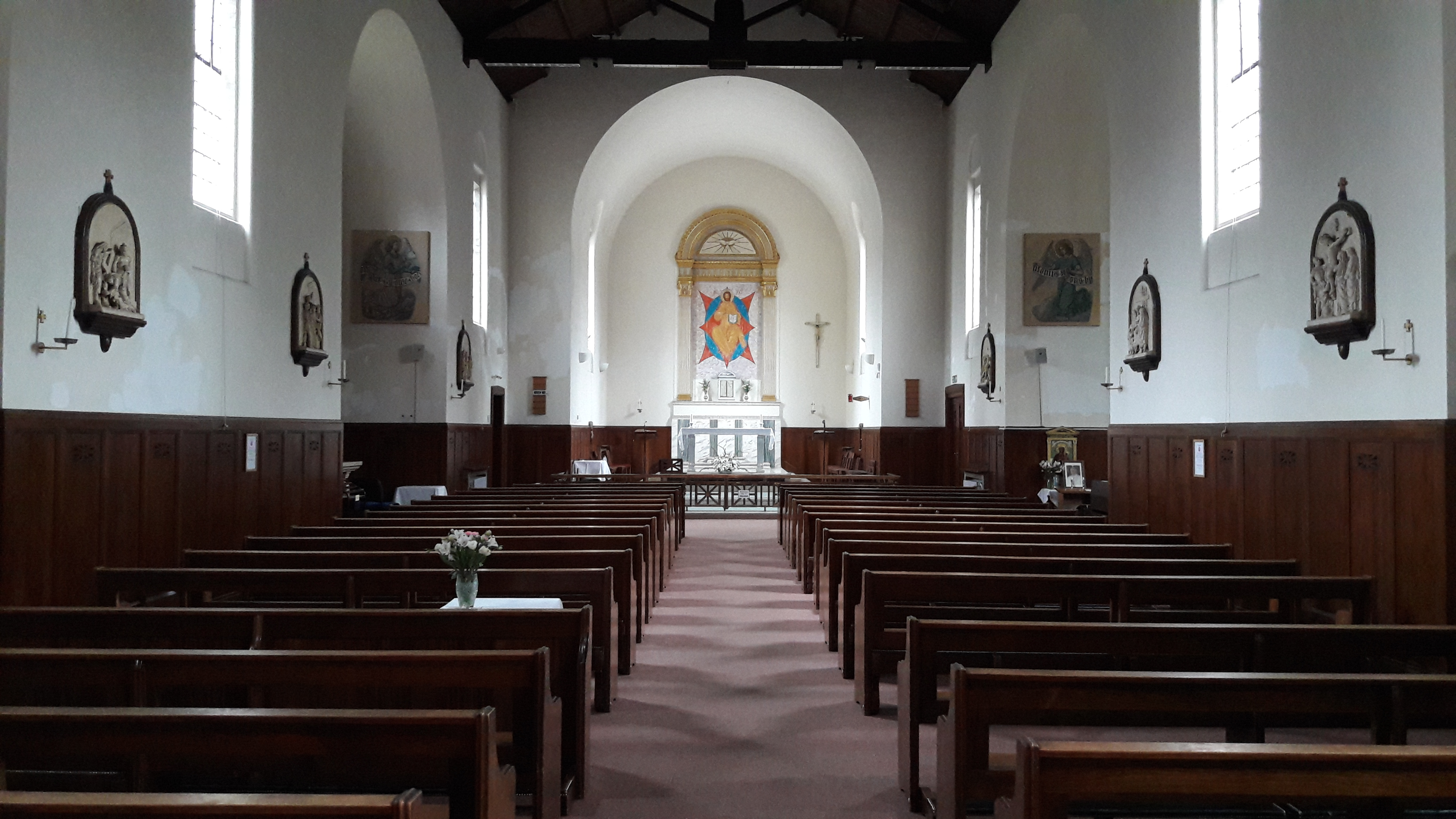
Nave

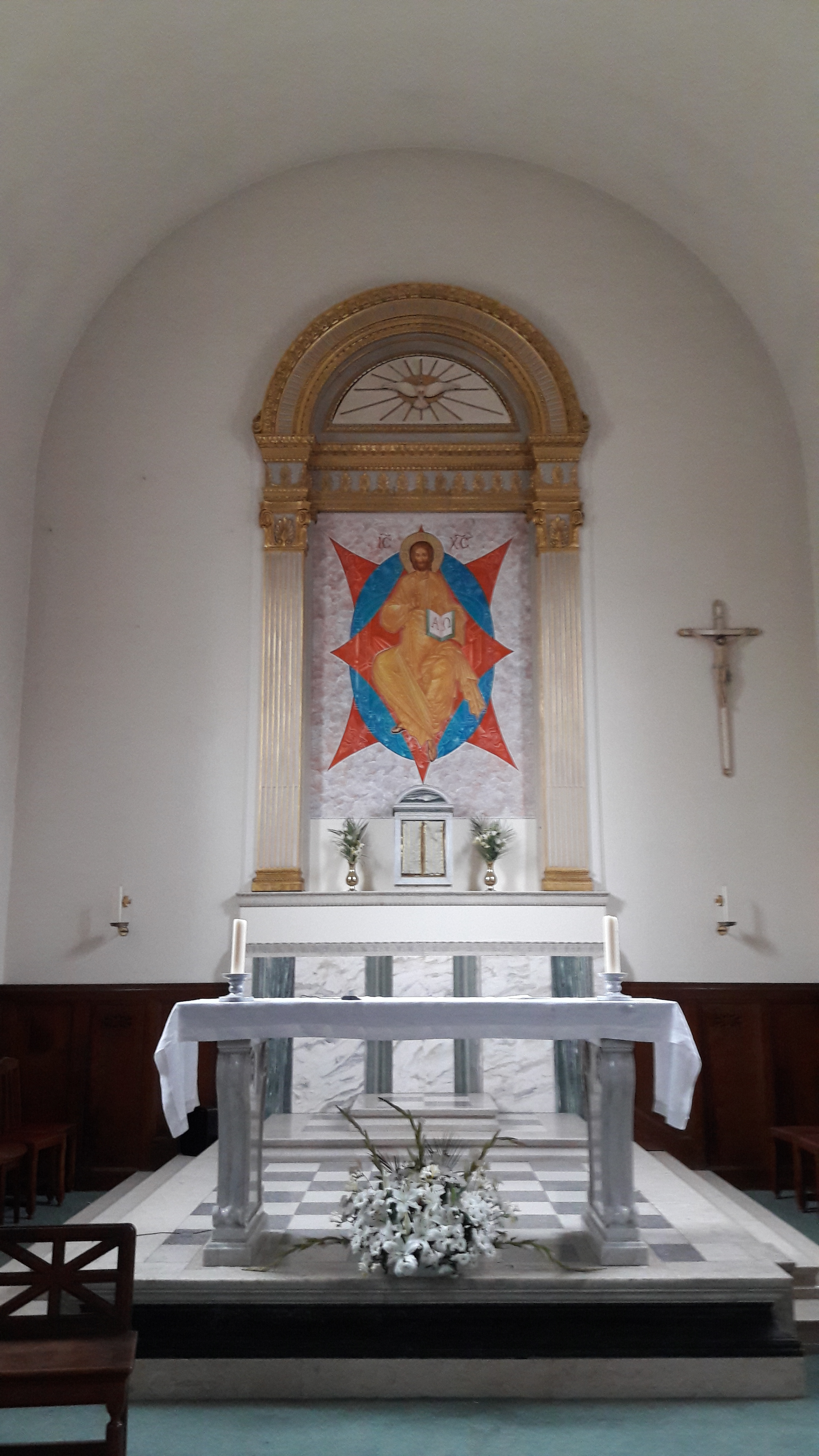
Chancel

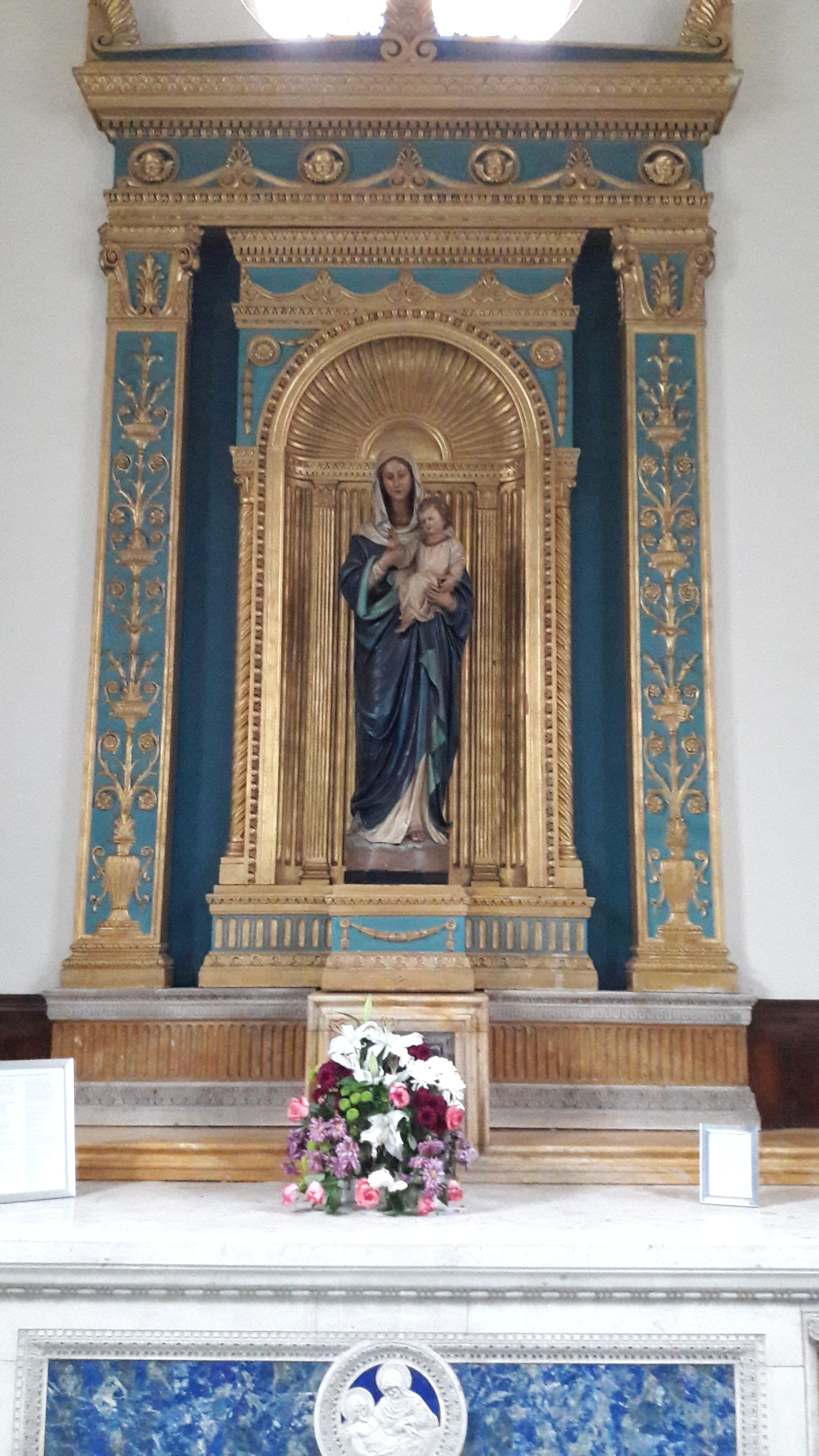
Lady chapel

== See also ==
- List of Jesuit sites
- Sacred Heart Church, Wimbledon
