= Malplaquet House =

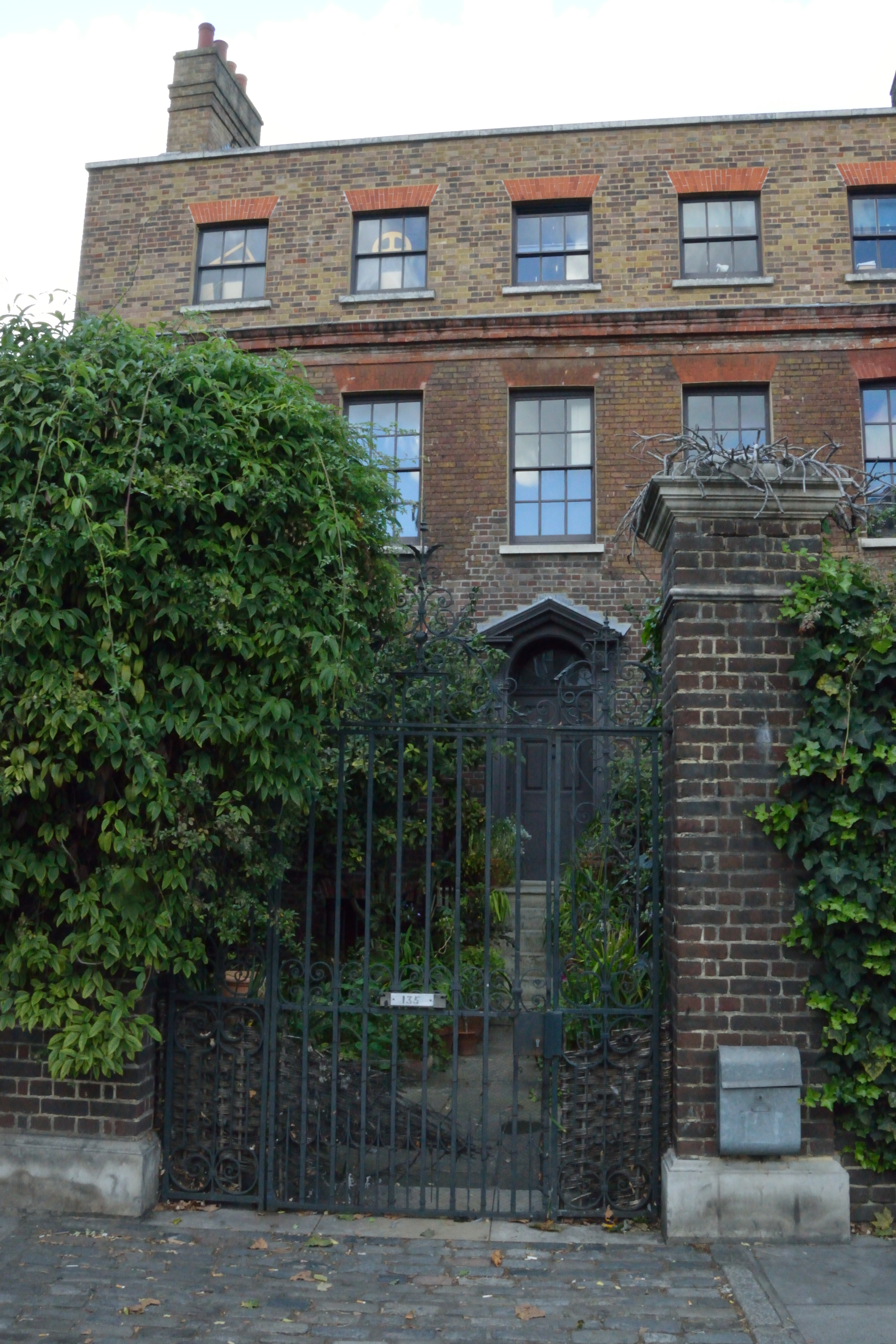

General information
- Type: Townhouse
- Architectural style: Georgian
- Address: 137–139 Mile End Road, Stepney
- Town or city: London
- Country: England
- Coordinates: 51°31′18″N 0°2′55″W
- Opened: 1742

Design and construction
- Architect(s): Thomas Andrews
- Designations: Grade II listed

Malplaquet House is a Grade II listed Georgian house at 137–139 Mile End Road, Stepney, London.

The four-storey house was built as one of three in 1742 by Thomas Andrews; only two of the houses survive to the present day. A wealthy Jewish widow was the first occupier of the house, with the brewer Harry Charrington living there from 1794 to 1833 (Charrington Brewery had offices in the Mile End Road). Charrington greatly altered the house, and following his occupancy the house was subdivided, and shops built on the front garden.

Malplaquet House is named after the Battle of Malplaquet, one of the main battles of the War of the Spanish Succession, which took place in France in 1709. However, it is not known whether this naming came from the Jewish widow of the London merchant, who made his living selling war salvage, or from a later resident, the military surgeon Edward Lee.

During the rest of the 19th century, the house played host to a variety of small businesses including a bookmaker and a printer, before being occupied in 1910 by the Union of Stepney Ratepayers. The Stepney union remained in the house until 1975. During their occupation, Malplaquet House was further subdivided and additions made to its structure. Malplaquet House was damaged during the London Blitz, but repairs began in 1951 after a £100 donation from the War Damage Association. The architect Richard Seifert provided new shop fronts for the house.

Prior to becoming badly degraded in the 1990s, the next door property to Malplaquet House, 133 to 135 Mile End Road, was occupied by A. Leaver Ltd, Packing Case Makers to H-M- Government. The owner of A. Leaver Ltd. advocated for the protection of the properties during compulsory purchase negotiations that commenced as part of the Dockland's development. This led to the intervention of the Spitalfields Trust which helped save it from potential demolition.

In 1998, Tim Knox (former director of Sir John Soane's Museum and the Fitzwilliam Museum in Cambridge, now Director of the Royal Collection) and landscape gardener Todd Longstaffe-Gowan purchased the house from the Spitalfields Trust for £250,000. It had not been inhabited as a personal residence for over a century. Knox and Longstaffe-Gowan's collections of objets d'art and esoteric objects, obtained from Portobello Market, auctions and flea markets, expanded to fill Malplaquet House.

In 2010, it was described by The Daily Telegraph as "possibly the most superbly restored, privately owned Georgian house in the country".

The house is part of a group of Grade II listed buildings on the Mile End Road, listed as 133–139 Mile End Road. It has been listed Grade II on the National Heritage List for England since March 1978.

== Bibliography ==
- Stourton, James (2012). Great Houses of London. Photographs by Fritz von der Schulenburg (Illustrated 1st ed.). London, England: Frances Lincoln. ISBN 978-0-7112-3366-9.
