= Templeton House =

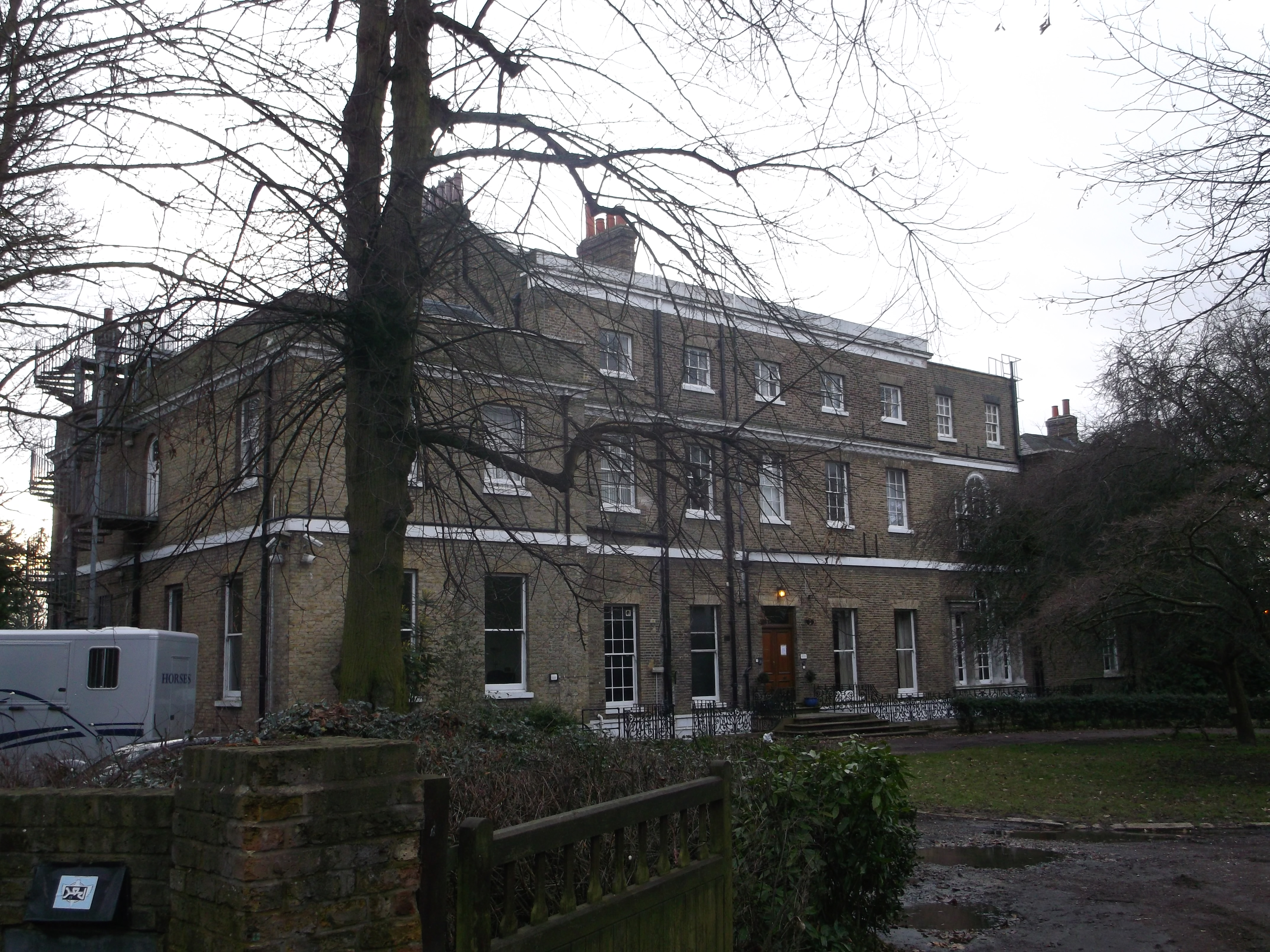
- Templeton House before restoration work was completed
- Interactive map of the Templeton House area

General information
- Type: Residential
- Architectural style: Georgian
- Location: Roehampton, London Borough of Richmond upon Thames, England
- Coordinates: 51°27′21″N 0°15′17″W
- Completed: 1780s

Design and construction
- Architect: Henry Darbishire

Listed Building – Grade II
- Official name: Templeton House
- Designated: 14 July 1955
- Reference no.: 1065517

Templeton House is a Grade II listed house in Roehampton, London, dating from the late 18th century and set in a three acre garden. It was completed in 1786 as part of the Grove Estate and is named after Lady Elizabeth Templetown who resided there as its first occupant.

The house has been used as a hospital during the First and Second World Wars as well as student accommodation for several decades under the nearby University of Roehampton. Winston Churchill briefly lived in the house with his wife Clementine, staying with the then owner Freddie Guest.

The 3rd season of Downtown Abbey has also used the house as a filming set.

Templeton House has been remodeled significantly throughout the years including by Ivor Guest who is said to be responsible for the Wrenaissance redecoration of the library in the early 1900s. After years of neglect the house underwent significant restoration in the 2010s. Among those carrying out the project were Todd Longstaffe-Gowan and Bob Sandford, with an aim of maintaining historic architectural elements.
