= Parkstead House =

Neo-classical villa in London, United Kingdom

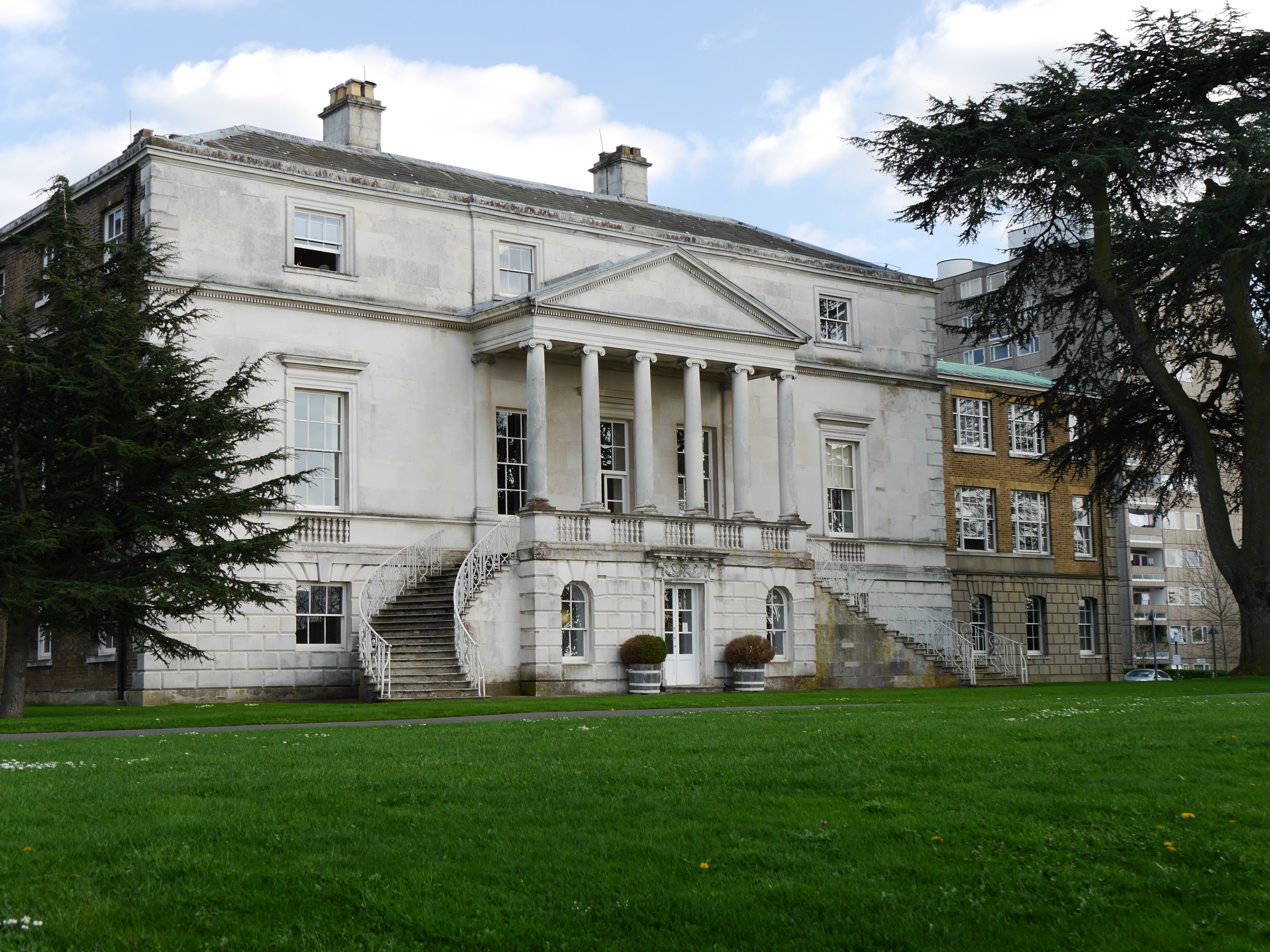
- House façade

- Location within London Borough of Wandsworth
- Former names: Manresa House; Bessborough House

General information
- Architectural style: Palladian
- Location: Roehampton, United Kingdom
- Coordinates: 51.4487°N 0.2433°W
- Groundbreaking: 1760
- Completed: 1768
- Owner: Whitelands College

Design and construction
- Architect: William Chambers
- Other designers: Joseph John Scoles; Frederick Walters
- Designations: Grade I listed

Parkstead House, formerly known as Manresa House and Bessborough House, is a neo-classical Palladian villa in Roehampton, London, built in the 1760s. The house and remaining grounds are now Whitelands College, part of the University of Roehampton. It is situated on Holybourne Avenue, off Roehampton Lane, next to the Richmond Park Golf Course in the London Borough of Wandsworth. In 1955 it was designated Grade I on the National Heritage List for England.

== History ==
=== Construction ===
It was built for the 2nd Earl of Bessborough, an Anglo-Irish peer. Construction on the building started circa 1760, by the architect Sir William Chambers, who also designed Somerset House in London. It was completed in circa 1768. The building was inspired by Chiswick House and Foots Cray Place.

A resident of Parkstead was the wife of the 3rd Earl of Bessborough, Henrietta Ponsonby, Countess of Bessborough, a Whig hostess, gambler and socialite. Lady Bessborough had a relationship with Granville Leveson-Gower, 1st Earl Granville, which produced two children. She had four children with her husband, Lord Bessborough. These were: John Ponsonby, 4th Earl of Bessborough, Frederick Ponsonby, Lady Caroline Lamb and William Ponsonby, 1st Baron de Mauley. On the death of Henrietta in 1821, the 3rd Earl leased the property to a politician, Abraham Robarts, who made it his permanent home. When Robarts died in 1858, the 5th Earl of Bessborough sold the house and forty-two acres of parkland to the Conservative Land Society for division into smallholdings.

=== Manresa House ===
In 1861, the house and 42 acres of surrounding land was sold to the Society of Jesus, the Jesuit religious order. The Jesuits used the building to house their novitiate and a retreat house for Ignatian spirituality. The house was renamed Manresa House after the town in Spain where Ignatius of Loyola developed his Spiritual Exercises. Within the property, the Jesuits created a cemetery. The first burial was in 1867. The cemetery contained only Jesuits, including Alban Goodier SJ, the Archbishop of Bombay from 1919 to 1926. From Manresa House, the Jesuits served the local Catholic congregations. In the following decades, various churches were built and staffed by the Jesuits, such as Christ the King Church, Wimbledon Park, in 1877, St Joseph Church, Roehampton, in 1881, Sacred Heart Church, Wimbledon, in 1884, Corpus Christi Church, Brixton, in 1886 and St Winefride Church, South Wimbledon, in 1904.

In 1860, they commissioned Joseph John Scoles to design the chapel. It was completed after his death, in 1864, by his pupil S.I. Nicholl. In the 1870s, Henry Clutton designed the north aisle which expanded the chapel. Clutton later designed the long gallery connecting the chapel to the refectory in the new north wing, which was built in 1880. In 1885, the south wing, designed by Frederick Walters, was added. It copied the elevation of the north wing. With the completion of these two wings the original stable blocks were demolished.

One of the Jesuits at Manresa House was the poet Gerard Manley Hopkins. He was a novice from September 1868 until September 1870. In the 1950s, London County Council compulsorily purchased the surrounding land and part of the Jesuit land for housing. The last burial in the cemetery was in 1962. By 1962, the Jesuits decided that Manresa would no longer be suitable for a novitiate, when the design of the housing estate was altered to include high rise flats adjacent to their land. According to one source, they sold the property to the council and the house became part of the Battersea College of Domestic Science. In October 1966 the college was opened by Shirley Williams who also signed the order for its subsequent closure in 1979. In 1963, Garnett College moved to Roehampton and later it made use of Manresa House. In 1986, Manresa House was part of the campus when Garnett College became absorbed into Thames Polytechnic, and teaching ended there in 1987, with the students moving to Avery Hill.

During a large part of the 1990s, the Manresa House premises was utilized by Wandsworth Council for community recreational purposes, providing adult life sculpture, pottery, painting and drawing and photography classes for local residents.

=== Whitelands College ===
The house was acquired as the new home of Whitelands College in 2001, which renamed the estate Whitelands College but referred to the original house as Parkstead House once more. It is now part of the University of Roehampton.

Under the guidance of English Heritage the college added extensive new buildings to incorporate lecture theatres, laboratories, classrooms and student facilities.

In the 1880s, Whitelands College, while they were based in Chelsea, commissioned Morris & Co. to make stained glass for their first chapel. This was moved with the college to Putney in 1930. In 2006, the stained glass was moved to Parkstead House. This commissioning of the work happened through the efforts of John Ruskin. In 1883, he wrote to Edward Burne-Jones, on behalf of the college, asking for him and William Morris to do the work. Of the fifteen windows the college received from Morris & Co., twelve were designed by Burne-Jones and three he made with Morris. Burne-Jones used some of designs he had previously created for the windows showing saints Agnes, Celia, Catherine, Dorothy, and Margaret. All of the others were made specifically for the college. In 1886, the reredos behind the altar in the chapel was installed. Although it was designed by William Morris, it was built by Kate Faulkner, sister of Charles Faulkner.

== Gallery ==
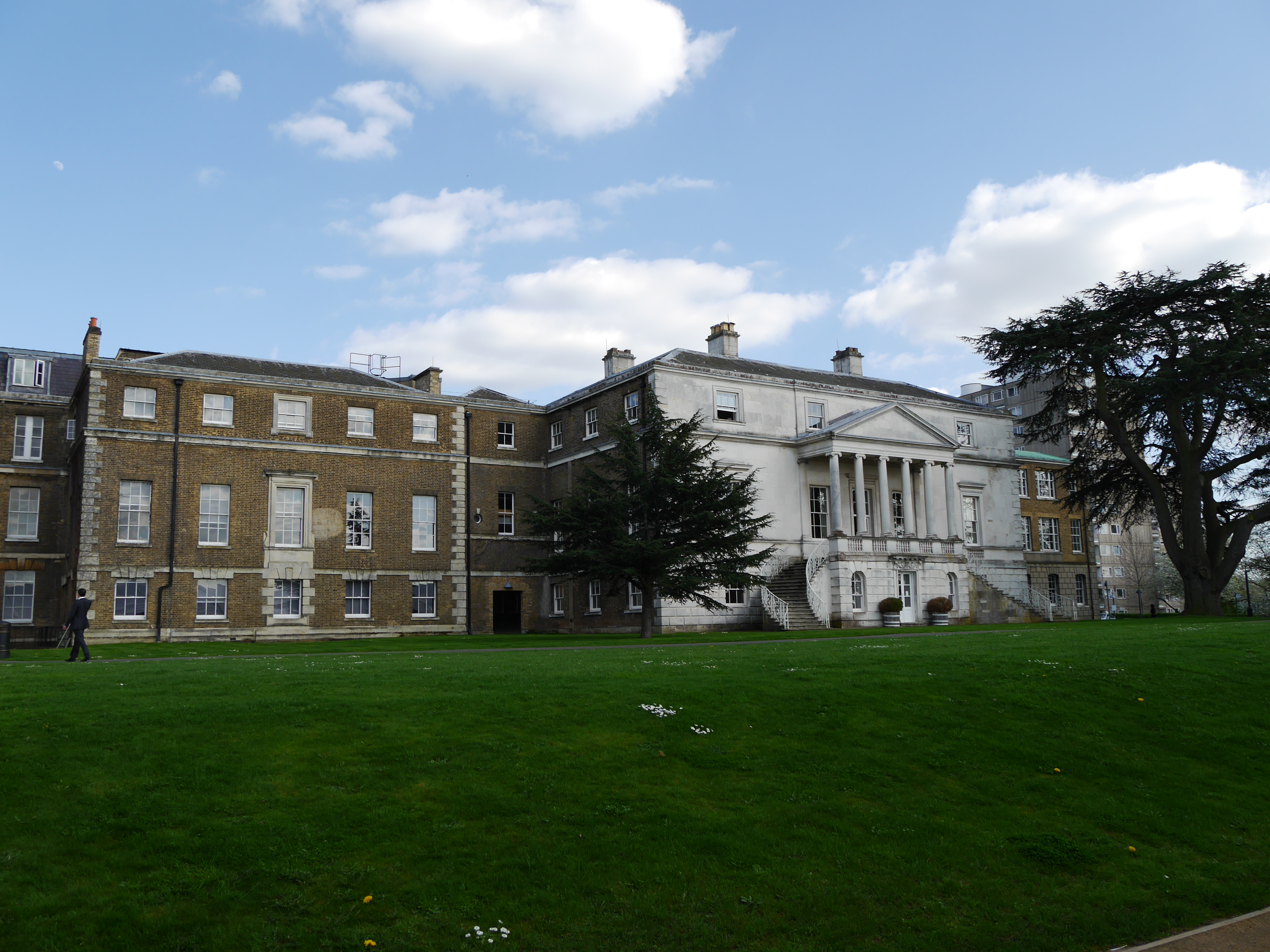
View of the building

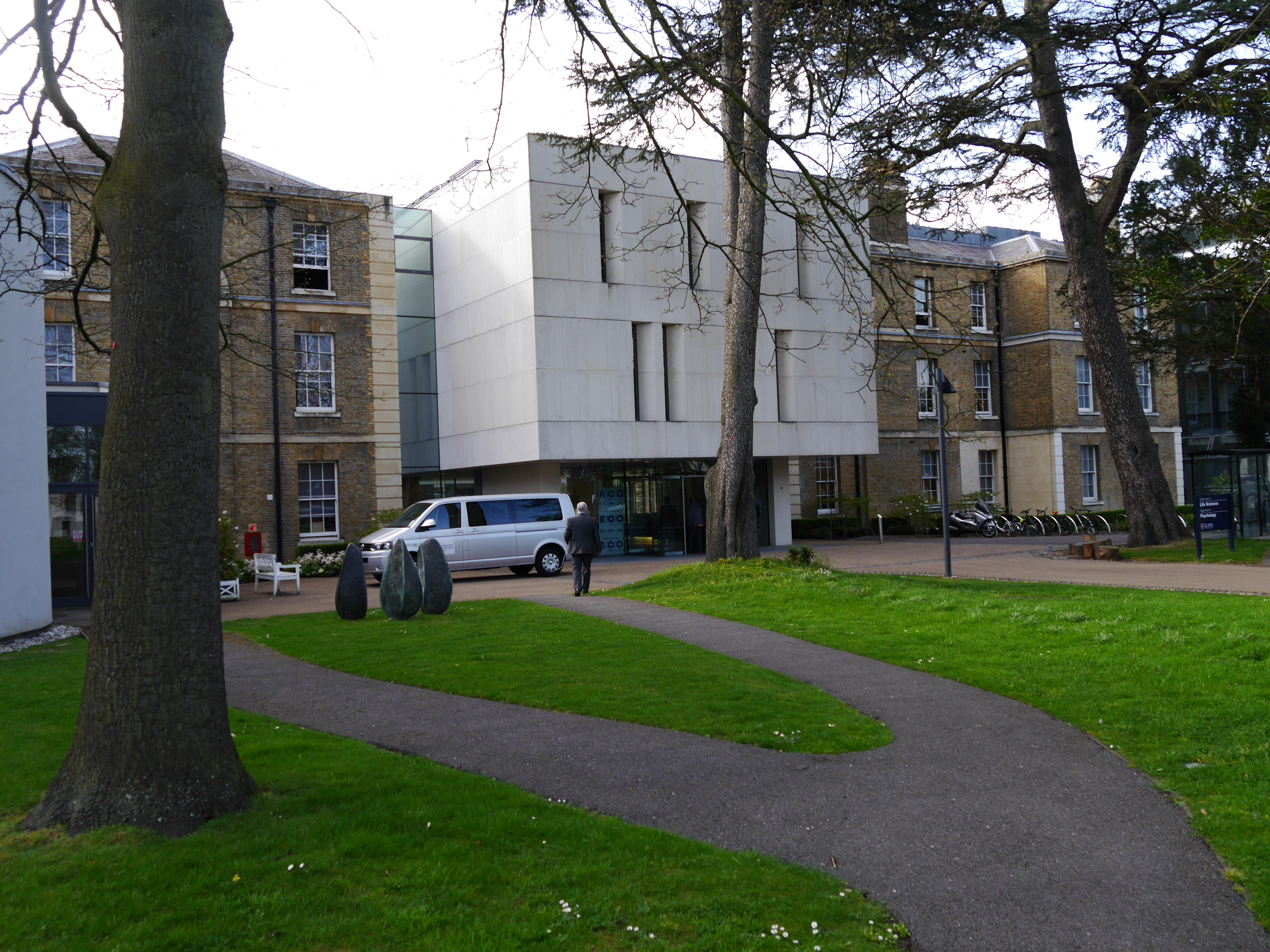
Building foyer

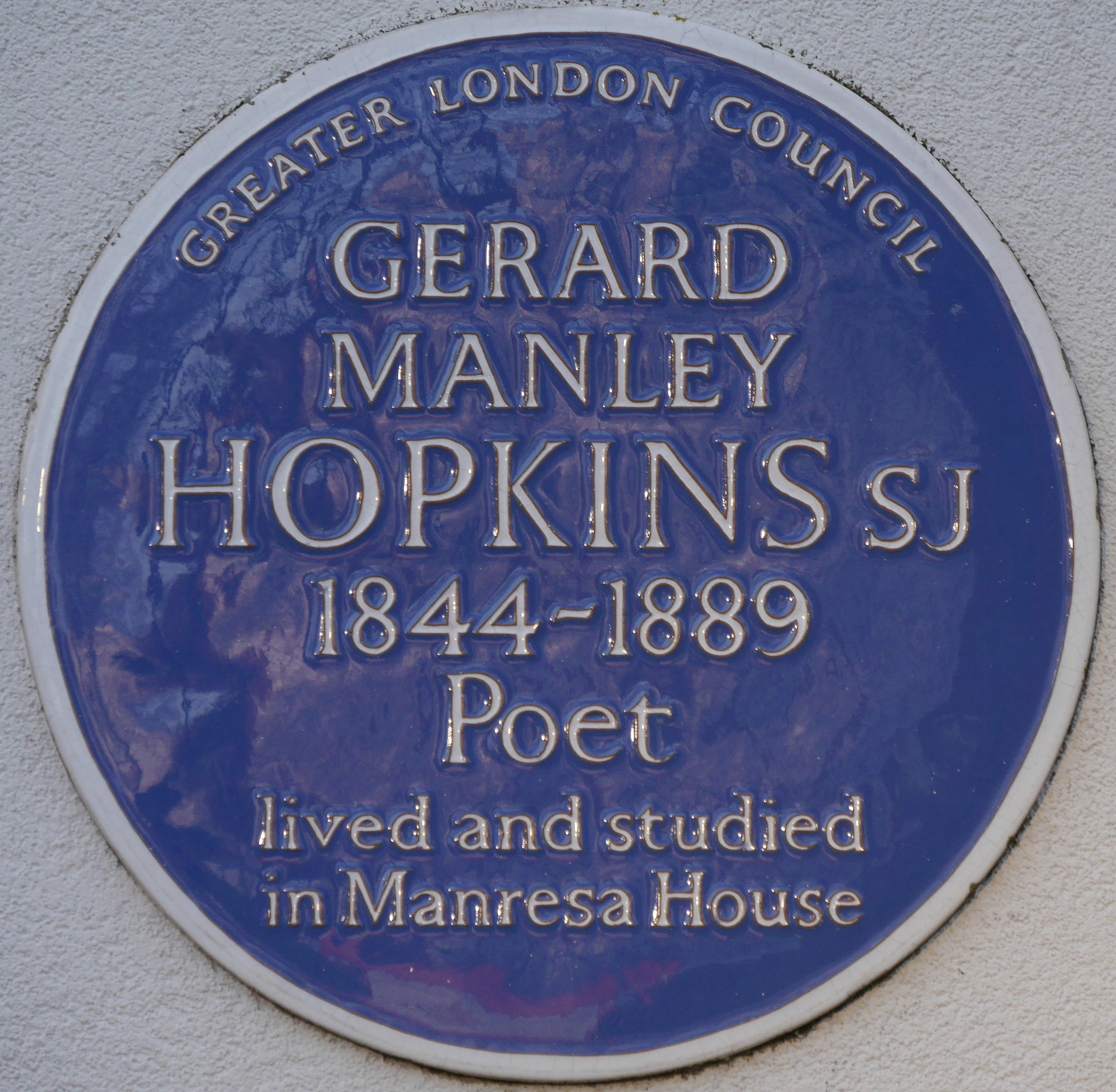
Blue plaque for Gerard Manley Hopkins

== See also ==
- List of Jesuit sites
