= St Winefride Church, South Wimbledon =

Coordinates: 51.4195°N 0.1937°W

St Winefride Church
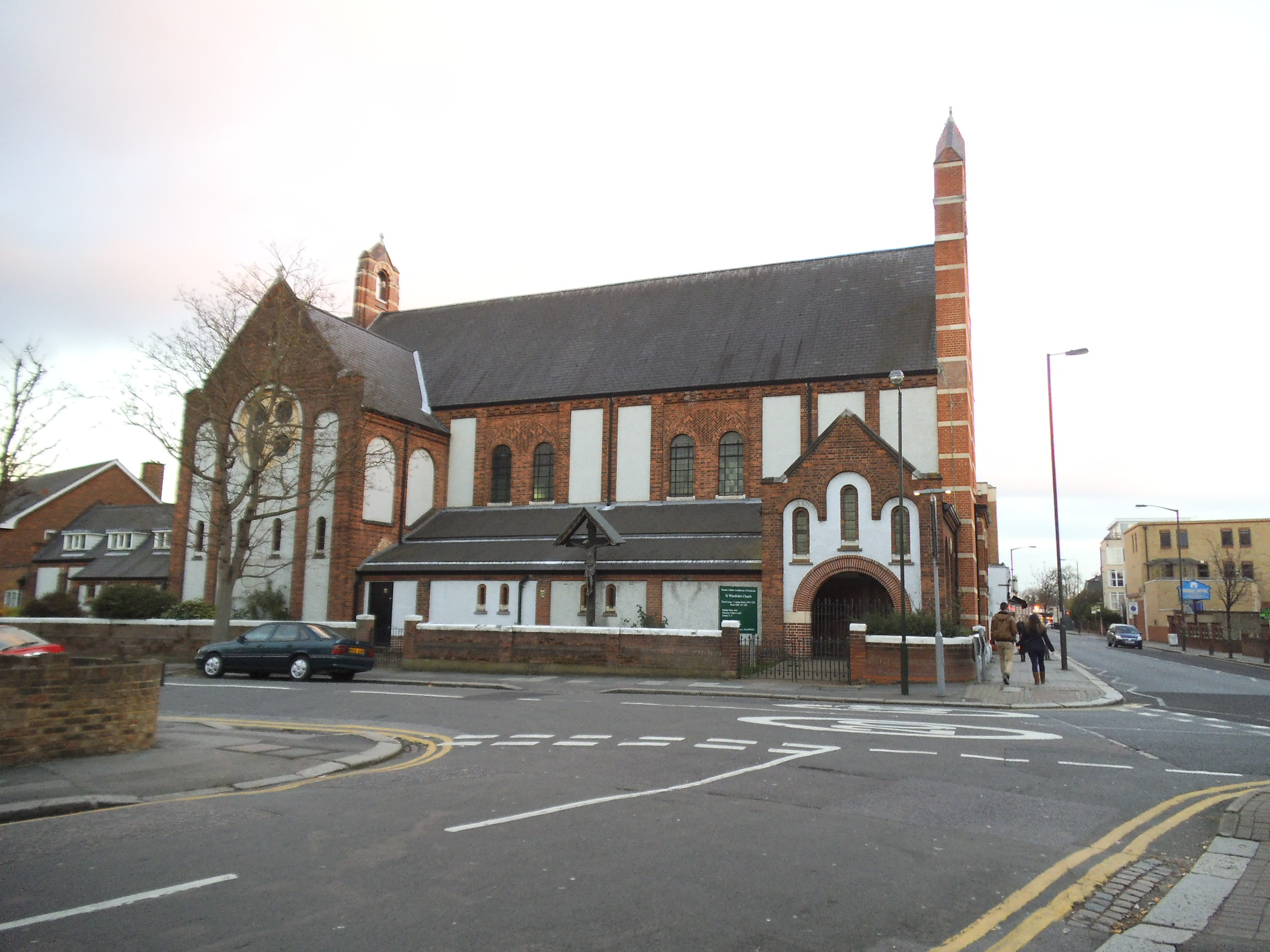
- Front entrance

- Location in the London Borough of Merton
- OS grid reference: TQ 25699 70492
- Location: South Wimbledon
- Country: England
- Denomination: Roman Catholic
- Website: WinefrideChurch.co.uk

History
- Status: Active
- Founder: Society of Jesus
- Dedication: Saint Winefride

Architecture
- Functional status: Parish church
- Heritage designation: Grade II listed
- Designated: 21 March 1996
- Architect: Frederick Walters
- Style: Romanesque Revival
- Groundbreaking: 1904
- Completed: 1905

Administration
- Province: Southwark
- Archdiocese: Southwark
- Deanery: Merton

St Winefride Church is Roman Catholic Parish church in South Wimbledon in the London Borough of Merton. It was founded as a chapel of ease of Sacred Heart Church, Wimbledon by the Society of Jesus in 1905. It is Grade II listed building and was designed by Frederick Walters.

== History ==
In 1877, The Jesuits came to Wimbledon at the request of Edith Arendrup, a member of the Courtauld family, from Roehampton where they had their novitiate, Manresa House. She asked that Mass be said in her house until a church was built. The Jesuits also went to South Wimbledon for the Catholics there and said Mass in St Mary's School. In 1884, Edith Arendrup commissioned the construction of Sacred Heart Church in the area. It was finished in 1887 and designed by Frederick Walters.

By 1903, the number of Catholics were growing in South Wimbledon and it was decided to build another church in the parish to accommodate to increasing congregation. The same architect of Sacred Heart Church, Frederick Walters, was asked to design the church. Construction started in 1904 and finished in 1905. The Jesuit influence on the church is shown by there being a statue of Saint Ignatius close to a statue of the parish patron, Saint Winefride.

In 1961, the Jesuits handed over administration of the church to the Archdiocese of Southwark who continue to serve the parish.

In the 1980s the church was reordered with the altar being brought forward. Stained glass was added to some of the windows and a central heating system was installed at this time. The church has a hall on Bridges Road, this continues as parish hall and was renovated in 2004.

== Parish ==
There are three Sunday Masses in the church, one at 6:00pm on Saturday evening, and then at 9:00am and 11:00am on Sunday morning. There are weekday Masses at 9:30am from Monday to Friday and another at 10:00am on Saturday.

Within the parish is St Mary's Catholic Primary School which a relationship with the church. It openly states that 'The education that the children receive at St Mary's has Gospel Values at its very core.' The school is a feeder of the Jesuit secondary school Wimbledon College.

== Interior ==
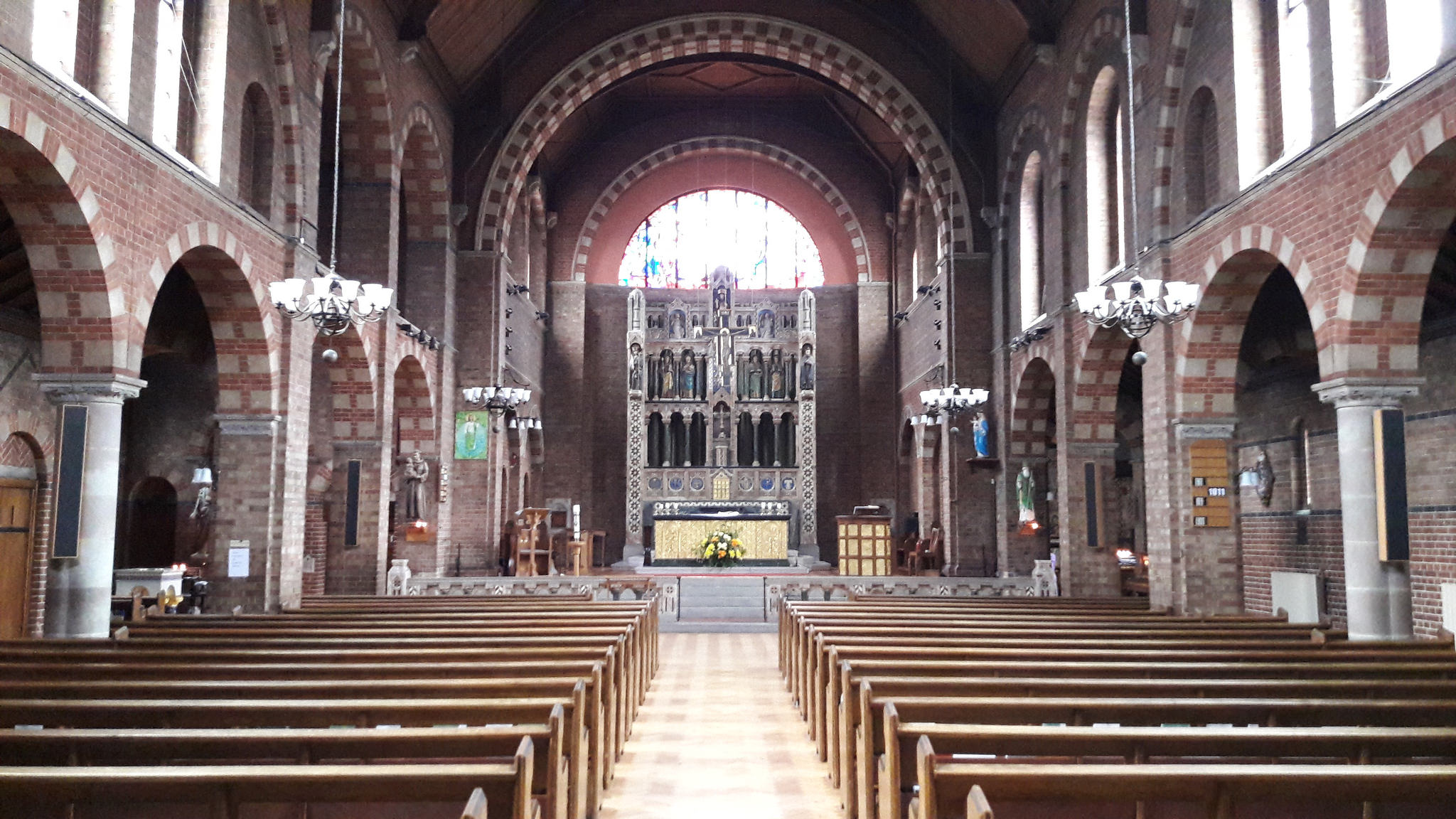
Nave

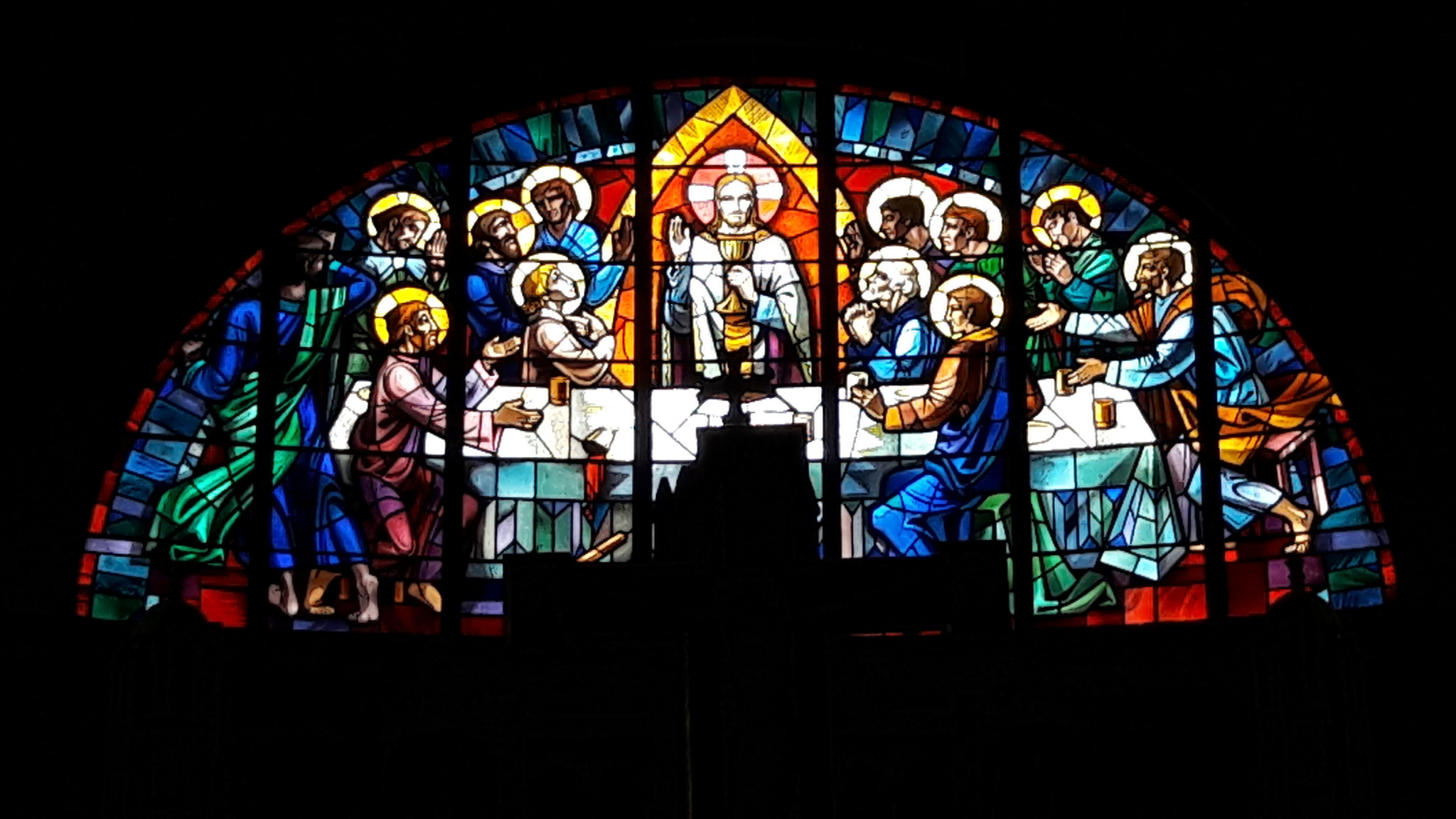
East window

== See also ==
- List of Jesuit sites
- Sacred Heart Church, Wimbledon
