= Garnett College =

Garnett College was a higher education college in London which trained lecturers in further and higher education colleges between 1946 and 1988. Its main focus was on teaching towards post-graduate qualifications awarded by the Council for National Academic Awards (CNAA) and the provision of lecturers throughout the UK. Students had to be at least 25 years old and be qualified in their teaching subject.

== History ==
Garnett College was the United Kingdom's only dedicated lecturer-training college (as distinct from teacher-training college). It was opened in 1946 to meet the teacher shortage following World War II. It was initially part of the North Western Polytechnic, and separated in 1953 as Garnett College, named after William Garnett, a former Board Secretary at the London County Council. It moved from north London to Roehampton in southwest London in 1963 where it occupied three sites (two teaching sites, Downshire House and Manresa House as well as a hostel, Mount Clare), and was under the control of the Inner London Education Authority. In 1986, it merged with Thames Polytechnic (later the University of Greenwich) and the students were moved to a site in Avery Hill.

It offered postgraduate courses (from the Certificate in Education to PhD) and was the main centre for training lecturers working in further education and teacher- training colleges (then known as Colleges of Higher Education) including its own staff. Its four faculties were: Commercial and Industrial Arts, Science and Technology, Humanities and Business studies and Education (which was also involved in professional development of their own staff).

There were three other centres in England also specialising in training further education lecturers, the Bolton College of Education (Technical), later incorporated into Bolton Institute of HE, Huddersfield Polytechnic and Wolverhampton Polytechnic, all now universities. The four institutions had a common admissions system separate from the better-known primary- and secondary-school teacher training system (known as the Graduate Teacher Training Registry (GTTR)). Unlike teacher-training courses, the minimum age for starting lecturer training was twenty-six but Garnett College allowed younger applicants to study there.

In addition, four universities which offered secondary school teacher training also offered further education teacher training, including the Universities of Manchester, Keele, and Leicester, as well as University College Cardiff (now the University of Cardiff). Students applying for teacher training could apply for joint further education lecturing/secondary teaching status via this system if they mixed further education/secondary classroom experience in their course.

In Northern Ireland, similar courses were offered by Londonderry Technical College and in Scotland only part-time lecturer training courses were offered, at Glasgow's Jordanhill College.
