= Winifred Mercier =

Educationist and college head (1878–1934)

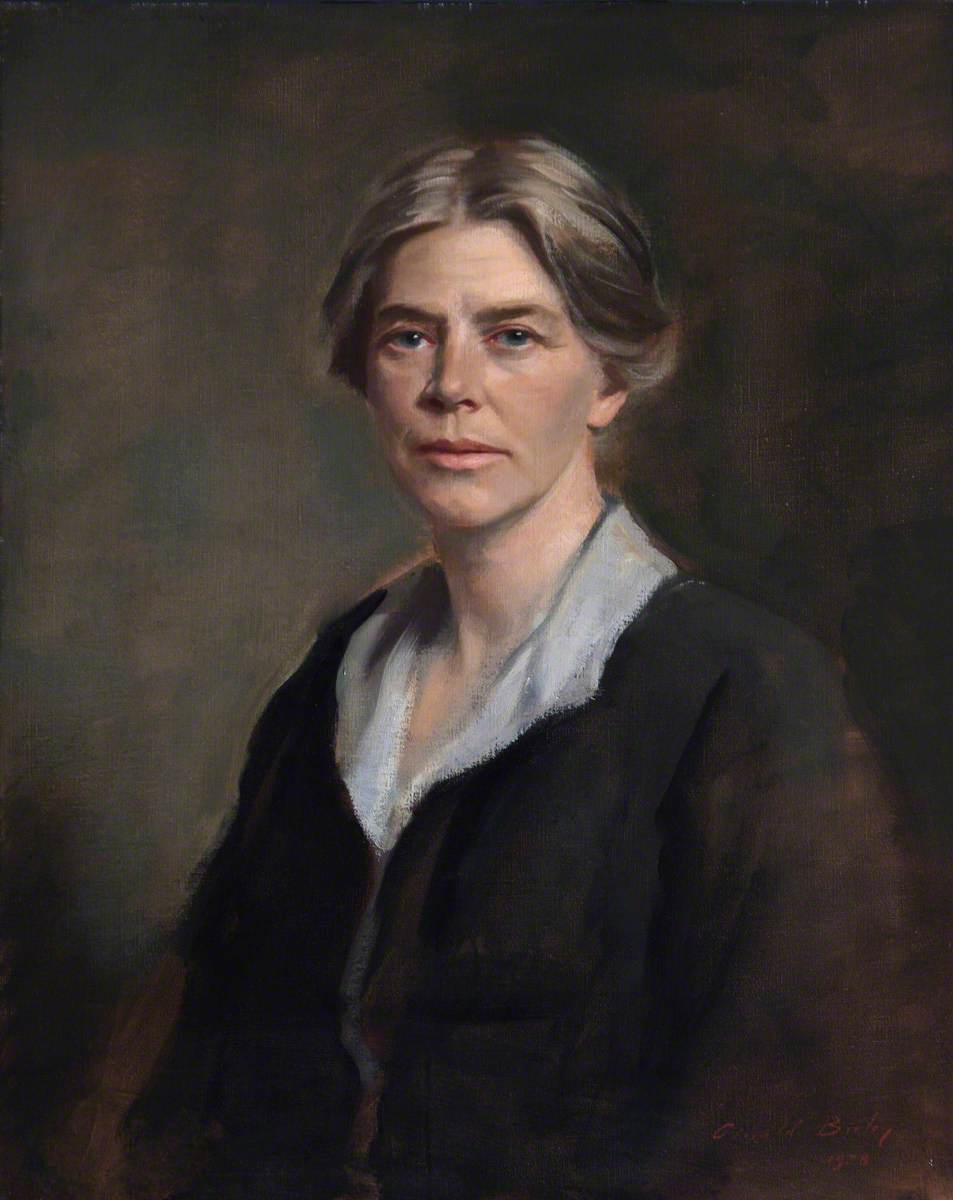
- commissioned in 1938 from Oswald Birley
- Born: 20 May 1878; Ilford, England
- Died: 2 September 1934 (aged 56); Surrey, England
- Education: Somerville College
- Employer: Whitelands College

Winifred Mercier OBE (20 May 1878 – 2 September 1934) was the principal of Whitelands College. She believed in education irrespective of class and gender and it has been argued that her approach is still relevant.

== Life ==
Mercier was born in Ilford in 1878. Her mother was Agnes Stedman and her father, Lewis Mercier, was a stockbroker but his enterprise failed. The family went to live with her grandfather Paul Metheun Stedman in Thurston in Suffolk where she was home schooled until she started at Wynaud House school. At that school, she became a student teacher and in 1897 she went to obtain a Teacher's certificate at the Maria Grey College. In 1899 she qualified and she joined the staff of St George's School, Edinburgh. Mercier's education was improved when a distant relative funded her study in 1904 at Somerville College in Oxford.

In 1913 she became the vice-principal of the Leeds Training College which had nearly 500 students and more than 60% of them were women. It was this fact that made the college's board to require that the principal should have a woman as vice-principal. However, it did not mean that the principal had to work closely with her. Mercier had clear ideas and she was inspired by the 1902 Education Act which she hoped would lead to the removal of distinctions in education due to class. She also highlighted that people who aspired to teach must themselves continue to learn. She believed that women and men students should be taught together. This was contentious.

She and the Leeds Training College principal had several disagreements and after three years she resigned. Some of the staff were not happy and as a result James Graham of the Leeds education board came to the college to address the staff. Her resignation and his instructive talk led to half of the women teachers also resigning from their positions.

Mercier continued to teach in Leeds and Manchester for two years before she became the Principal of Whitelands College in 1918. The college had been one of the first to offer higher education to women. The college continued to grow from 180 to 230 students. The premises were noisy and the leases needed renewing. Mercier persuaded the Church of England that they should fund new buildings. In 1930, Mercier and the students moved to new premises designed by Sir Giles Gilbert Scott in Southfields, near Putney.

She was made an Officer of the Order of the British Empire (OBE) in the 1933 New Year Honours.

== Death and legacy ==
Mercier died in 1934 in Surrey. Her ideas continued, in 2017 they were being discussed as relevant to contemporary British education.

In 1938, the artist, Oswald Birley created a portrait painting of her which (in 2023) is at Whitelands College.
