= Downshire House, Roehampton =

Historic house in Roehampton, London

Downshire House
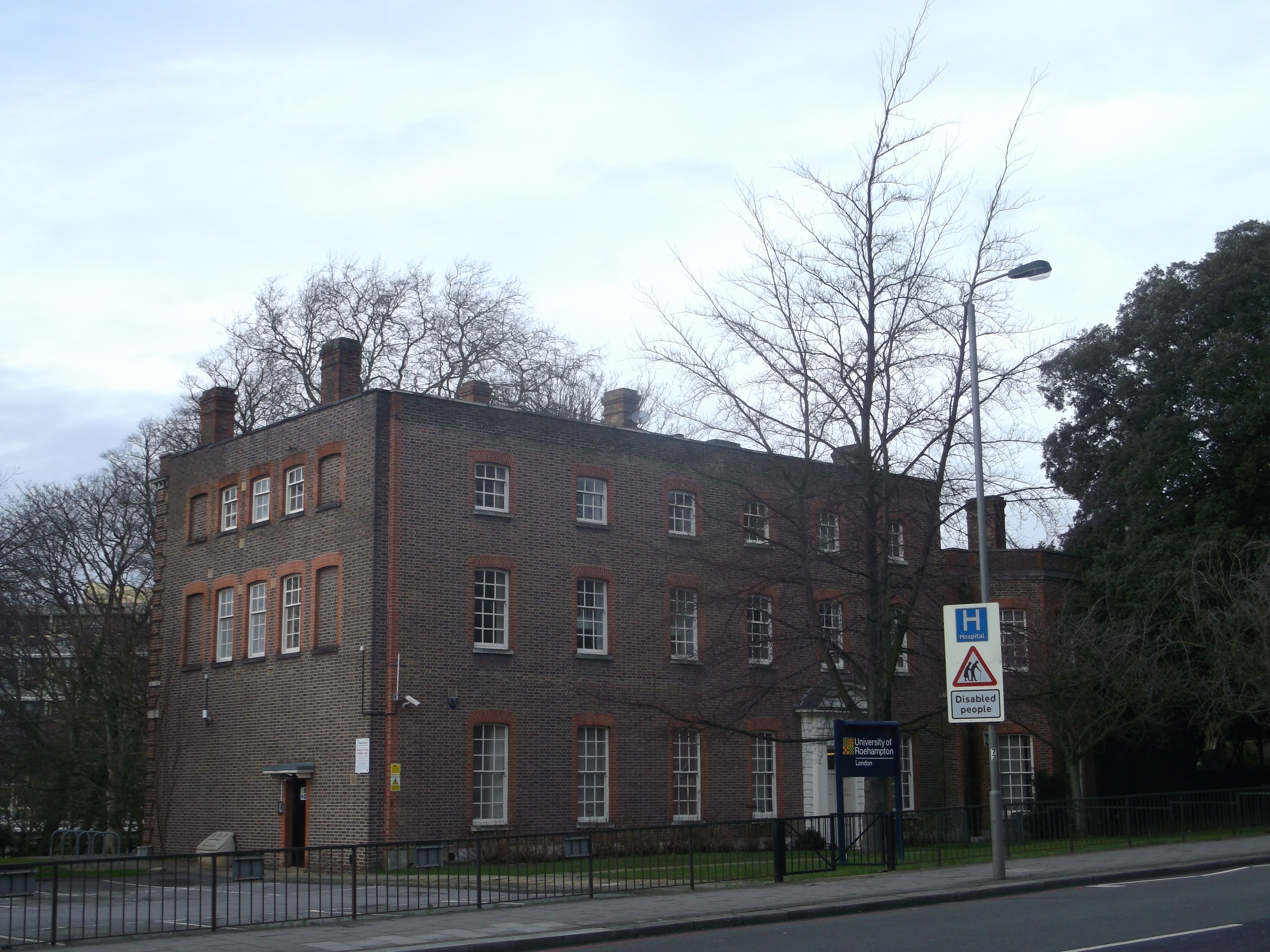
- Interactive map of the Downshire House area

General information
- Location: Roehampton, London, England
- Coordinates: 51°27′10″N 0°14′39″W
- Completed: 1770s

Listed Building – Grade II*
- Official name: Downshire House
- Designated: 14 July 1955
- Reference no.: 1065522

Downshire House is a Grade II* listed house in Roehampton, London. It was built in the 1770s and possible designed by Matthew Brettingham the Younger or his cousin Robert Furze Brettingham who worked on the house a couple of decades later.

Although there have been a number of additions and alterations, the house in its current state has been noted for its decorated central hall with marble flooring and Rococo plaster-work.

== Background ==
The house is named for the Marquesses of Downshire for whom it was built and hosted General Cholmondeley as its first occupant. The gardens were laid out in large part by Stephen Herbert Gatty who owned the property between 1912 and 1920.

The southern wing of the house was demolished shortly after the Second World War and was later occupied by Garnett College beginning in 1963.
