= Whitelands College =

Oldest college of the University of Roehampton

Coordinates: 51.4487°N 0.2433°W

- University of Roehampton
- Location: Roehampton, London, England
- Established: 1841
- Named for: Whitelands House on the King's Road in Chelsea
- Website: https://www.roehampton.ac.uk/colleges/whitelands-college/

Whitelands College is the oldest of the four constituent colleges of the University of Roehampton.

== History ==
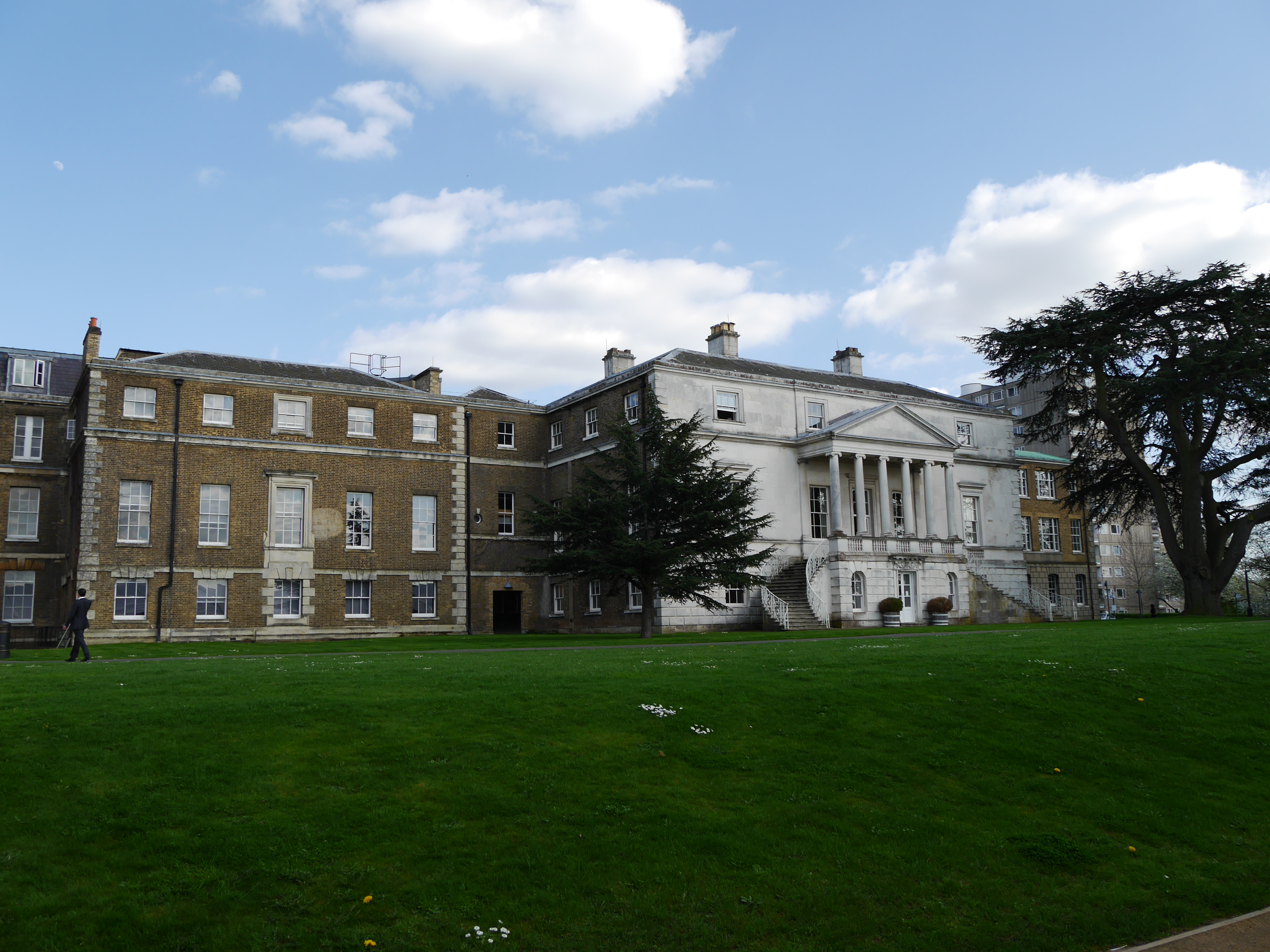
Parkstead House, Roehampton, London

Whitelands College is one of the oldest higher education institutions in England (predating every university except Oxford, Cambridge, London and Durham). It was founded in 1841 by the Church of England's National Society as a teacher training college for women. A flagship women's college of the Church of England, it was the first college of higher education in the UK to admit women. Associated with it was Whitelands College School, which opened in 1842; indirectly, this continues as Lady Margaret School.

The college was originally based in, and named after, a Georgian building, Whitelands House, on King's Road, Chelsea. The original house was demolished and rebuilt in 1890 to meet the requirements of a growing number of students. In 1918 Winifred Mercier was appointed as the principal. The college continued to grow from 180 to 230 although the premises were noisy and the leases needed renewing. Mercier persuaded the Church of England that they should fund new buildings. In 1930, Mercier and the students moved to new premises designed by Sir Giles Gilbert Scott in Southfields, near Putney. (The Chelsea building was sold to the British Union of Fascists to be their national headquarters, becoming known subsequently as the "Black House".)

The new Whitelands College was formally opened by Queen Mary in 1931. The extensive campus was expanded over the following years, with additional residential and academic buildings constructed on site.

During the Second World War, the students of Whitelands College were evacuated to Homerton College, Cambridge; Bede College, Durham; and Halifax, Yorkshire and the college was commissioned by the British Government to accommodate 500 Gibraltar evacuees.

Whitelands became coeducational in 1965.

The college remained in Putney until 2005, when it relocated to Parkstead House, a Grade I listed neo-classical Palladian villa on a 14-acre site overlooking Richmond Park, in Roehampton: the house was originally built in the early 1760s for the 2nd Earl of Bessborough, and was extended and renamed Manresa House after becoming a Jesuit novitiate in the mid-nineteenth century. The main vacated building on the Southfields site was subsequently converted into luxury housing.

== University status ==
In 1975, Whitelands College entered into an academic federation with three other south-west London teacher training colleges – Digby Stuart, Froebel and Southlands – to form the Roehampton Institute of Higher Education (RIHE). It operated independently, but its degrees were validated by the University of Surrey.

In 2000, the Roehampton Institute of Higher Education federated with the University of Surrey to become the University of Surrey Roehampton.

The University of Surrey Roehampton announced that it would submit an application for independent university status in late 2003. This was granted on 1 August 2004, with the name Roehampton University.

In 2011 the name was formally changed from Roehampton University to the University of Roehampton.

== Festivals ==
The college has traditionally kept two major annual festivals: the St Ursula Festival in October, and the May Day Festival in May.

=== St Ursula ===
The college was placed under the patronage of Saint Ursula, and the College chapels at Chelsea, Southfields, and Roehampton have all been dedicated to her. A stained glass window by Edward Burne-Jones, depicting Ursula, was installed in the original Chelsea chapel, and has moved with the college on each of its relocations (1931 and 2005), along with a series of matching windows depicting other female saints.

=== May Day ===
The first May Day festival was held at Whitelands College in 1881 at the instigation of the Victorian philanthropist John Ruskin, a friend of the then College Principal, the Reverend Canon John Faunthorpe. The Festival is held annually, and includes the enthroning of a May Queen, or (since becoming coeducational) a May King, elected by the student body during the preceding academic term. The ceremony is presided over each year by a visiting Anglican Bishop.
