= Ubuntu Museum: African Museum of Humanity =

Small museum in Roehampton, London

Coordinates: 51.4522428°N 0.249203°W

The Ubuntu Museum: African Museum of Humanity is a small mobile museum dedicated to the experiences of people of colour in Britain and the West. Ubuntu Museum is an African-led social enterprise specializing in educational workshops that include crafting activities, quizzes, and mini exhibitions. The museum brings these experiences to schools, libraries, and community spaces across Greater London and offer their services for private parties.

== History ==
The museum was founded by artist Jackie Mwanza in 2018.

== Exhibitions and activities ==
The Nude Gallery in 2019 focused on the assumptions of the colour nude in everyday life, highlighting that historically it has been only applicable to those with lighter skin tones. In 2020 the museum hosted events for Black History Month on the use of recycled materials and found objects in art, in particular focusing on the sculptor El Anatsui. The museum will host workshops for children about recycled art in 2021.

== Location ==
The Museum is based in a former commercial unit at 6 Portswood place on the Alton Estate in Roehampton.

== Transport ==
The museum is served by Transport for London buses 170, 430, 639 and 670 which stop on Danebury Avenue. Barnes railway station (Southwestern Railway) is a 25-minute walk from the museum.
