= Sacred Heart Church, Wimbledon =

Catholic church in London, England

Coordinates: 51.4177°N 0.2194°W

Sacred Heart Church
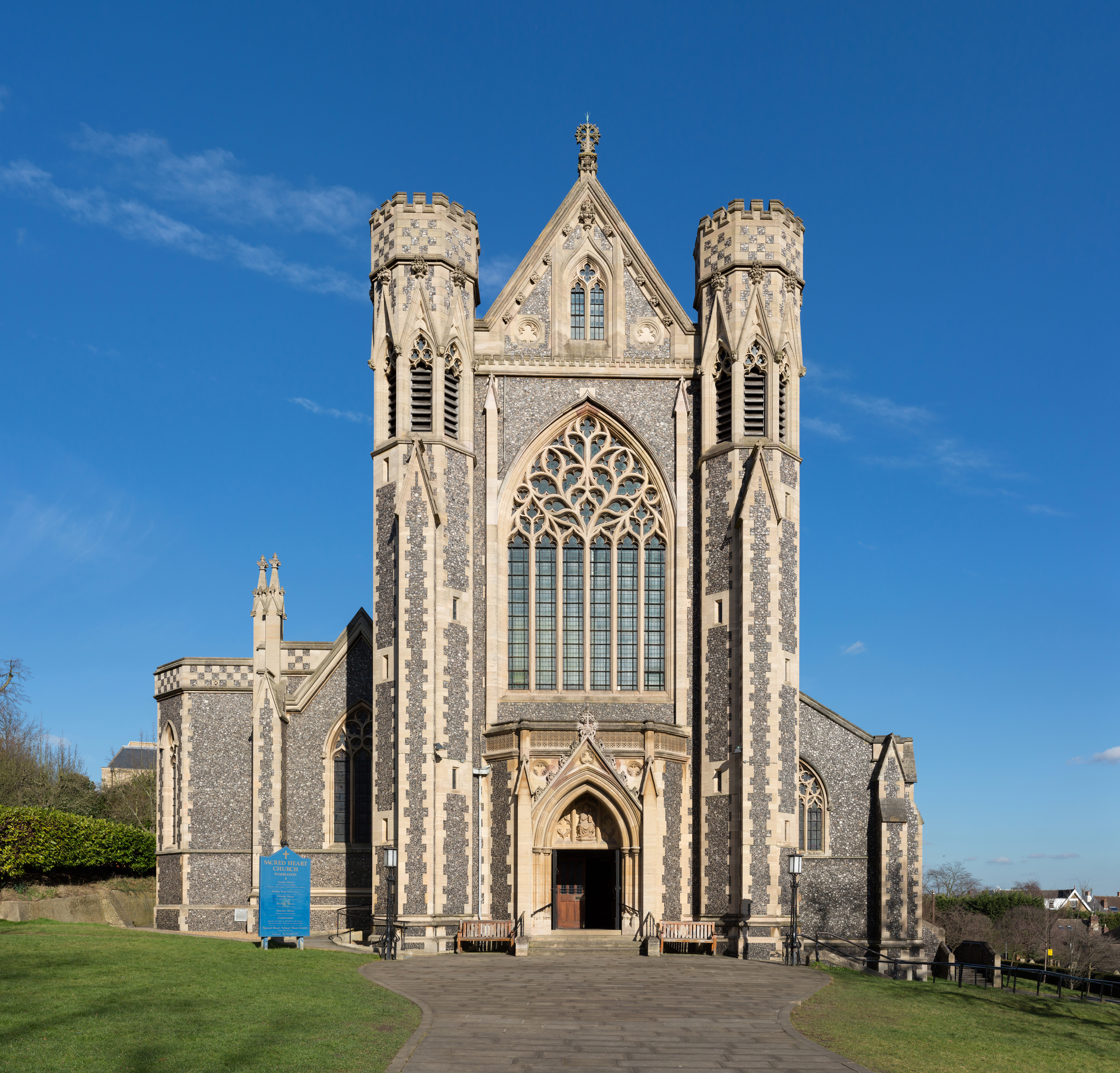
- Sacred Heart Church viewed from the main gate.

- Location of church within the London Borough of Merton
- OS grid reference: TQ 23916 70250
- Location: Wimbledon, London
- Country: England
- Denomination: Roman Catholic
- Website: SacredHeartWimbledon.org.uk

History
- Status: Church
- Founded: 17 June 1887
- Founder: Edith Arendrup
- Dedication: Sacred Heart of Jesus
- Consecrated: 1931
- Events: Reordered in 1990; Refurbished in 2009

Architecture
- Functional status: Active
- Heritage designation: Grade II*
- Designated: 28 May 1987
- Architect: Frederick Walters
- Style: Late Decorated Gothic (Gothic Revival)
- Completed: 1901

Administration
- Province: Southwark
- Archdiocese: Southwark
- Deanery: Merton

Sacred Heart Church is a Catholic parish church in Wimbledon, South West London initially run by the Jesuits, that serves the Catholic community of Wimbledon and surrounding areas. It is in the Archdiocese of Southwark and is situated next to Wimbledon College and Donhead Preparatory School. The main entrance to the church is on Edge Hill road, but the church can also be accessed from the adjacent Darlaston Road.

== History ==
=== Founding ===
The church was founded by Edith Arendrup, a member of the wealthy Courtauld family who came to live in Wimbledon in 1877. At the time, there were few Catholics in the area, so she convinced the Jesuits at Roehampton to start a Mass-centre at her house in Cottenham Park. Seven years later, she commissioned the construction of a large church in a prominent position on the slopes of Edge Hill. The Grade II* listed building was designed by Frederick Walters, a young architect, who designed it in the late Decorated Gothic style.

=== Construction ===
The nave of the newly built church opened on 17 June, the feast of the Sacred Heart, in 1887. Construction continued for fourteen years while the rest of the building was completed: first the sanctuary and south aisle in 1895, then the back chapels in 1896, the north aisle and sacristy in 1898, and finally the west front in 1901. The original plan called for a large tower on the west front, but money ran out and it was replaced by twin turrets and a massive, traceried window. A monument on the south wall of the church dedicated to Edith Arendrup is inscribed with the words: “It was through her Christian vision that this parish of the Sacred Heart came into being; it was through her generosity the church was built.”

From 1898, the church had a new benefactor, Caroline Currie of Coombe Hill. She was the wealthy widow of the banker Bertram Wodehouse Currie, and paid for the north aisle, along with a chapel dedicated to the founder of the Jesuits, St. Ignatius, and the baptistery. The St. Ignatius chapel contains a medallion of Mrs. Currie who died in 1902.

In 1905, another church was built within the parish by the Jesuits, St Winefride Church. It was built to accommodate the congregation in South Wimbledon. In 1913, again the parish needed to expand and a Mass centre was set up in Wimbledon Park. In 1926, a church was built in the area by the Jesuits which became Christ the King Church and was finished in 1928.

=== 20th century ===
In 1990 the church was re-ordered. A new high altar was installed, designed by David John who was also responsible for the bronze reliquary underneath containing relics of Roman and English martyrs, including Saints Thomas More and Saint Edmund Campion. The tiled floor was designed by Austin Winkley. The altar was dedicated by Bishop Tripp, an Auxiliary bishop of the Archdiocese of Southwark, at a special ceremony on the feast of the Sacred Heart, 22 June 1990.

=== 21st century ===
In 2007 and 2008 the church halls were refurbished, access improved and a new youth room added. On 17 November 2012, it was announced that the Jesuits would no longer be involved in the direct administration of the church after serving the parish for over 130 years. On 10 January 2014, it was handed over to the Archdiocese of Southwark who continue to administer the parish.

== Parish ==
The church is next door to Wimbledon College and Donhead School for boys (both of these schools are served by the Jesuits) and the Ursuline High School and Ursuline Preparatory School for girls (served by the Ursulines), which all enjoy a close relationship with the parish. The schools use the church for various masses throughout the school year.

The parish hosts many groups within its parish centre. It has a local Christian Life Community association which ministers to the spiritual needs of the parish, by garnering interest in Ignatian spirituality. Also, it has a social justice group which promotes fair trade products and raises awareness of social issues.

=== Jesuit Missions ===
Jesuit Missions is a development and mission-based charity of the Society of Jesus in Britain. It remains on the same street as the church after the Jesuits handed the parish over to the archdiocese. In 1961, it moved from Roehampton to Wimbledon and was led by Tony Montfort for 40 years. It organises fundraising initiatives, such as through the London Marathon, and distributes the money to developing countries. It distributes news about the activities of overseas Jesuits and other missionaries, such as the imprisonment of Stan Swamy, and the murders of La Salle laybrother Paul McAuley in Peru, and Fr Victor-Luke Odhiambo in Kenya. It with other charities and networks such as Global First Responder, Educate Magis, the Xavier Network, Justice in Mining group and within the Global Ignatian Advocacy Network.

== Gallery ==
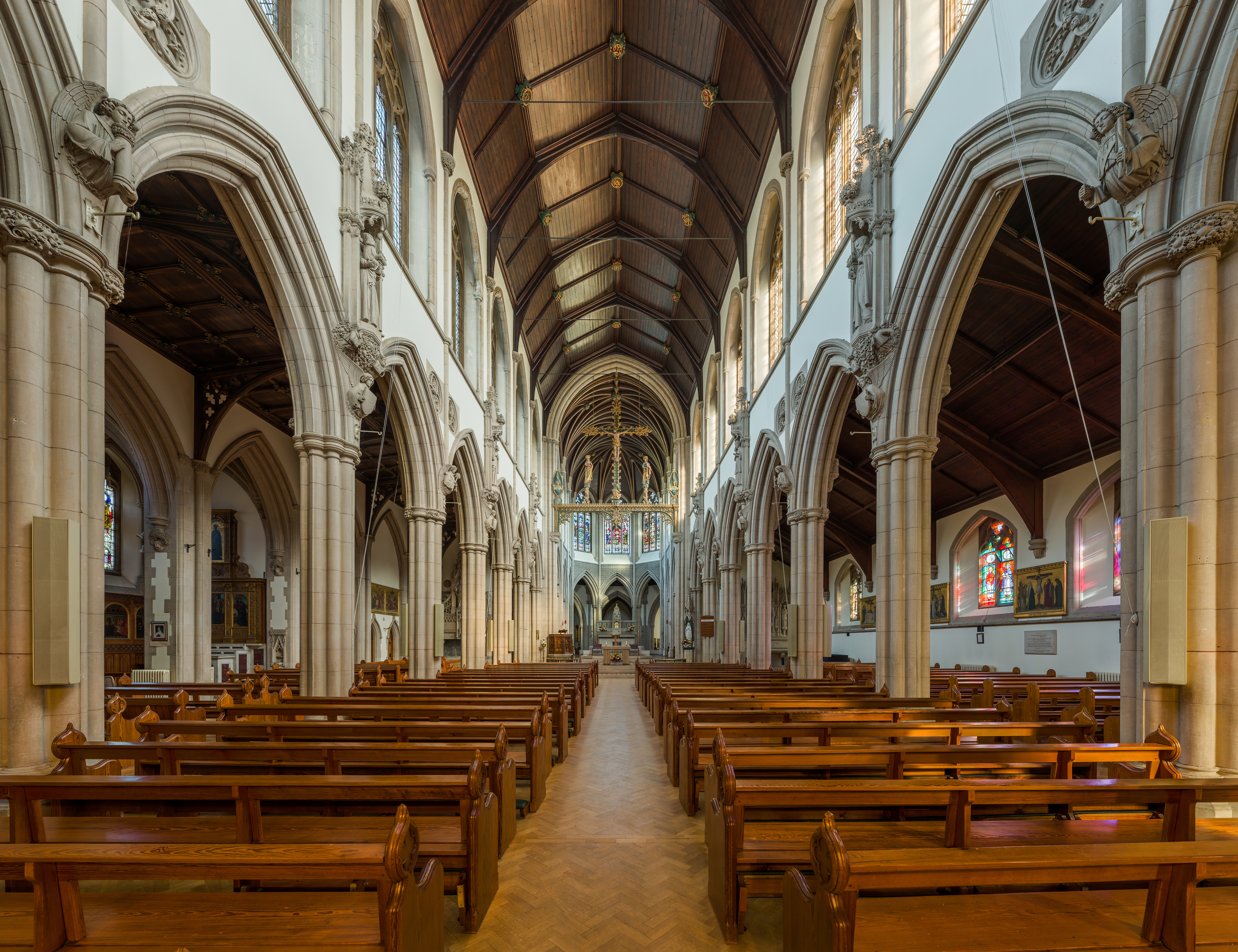
The nave looking north-east

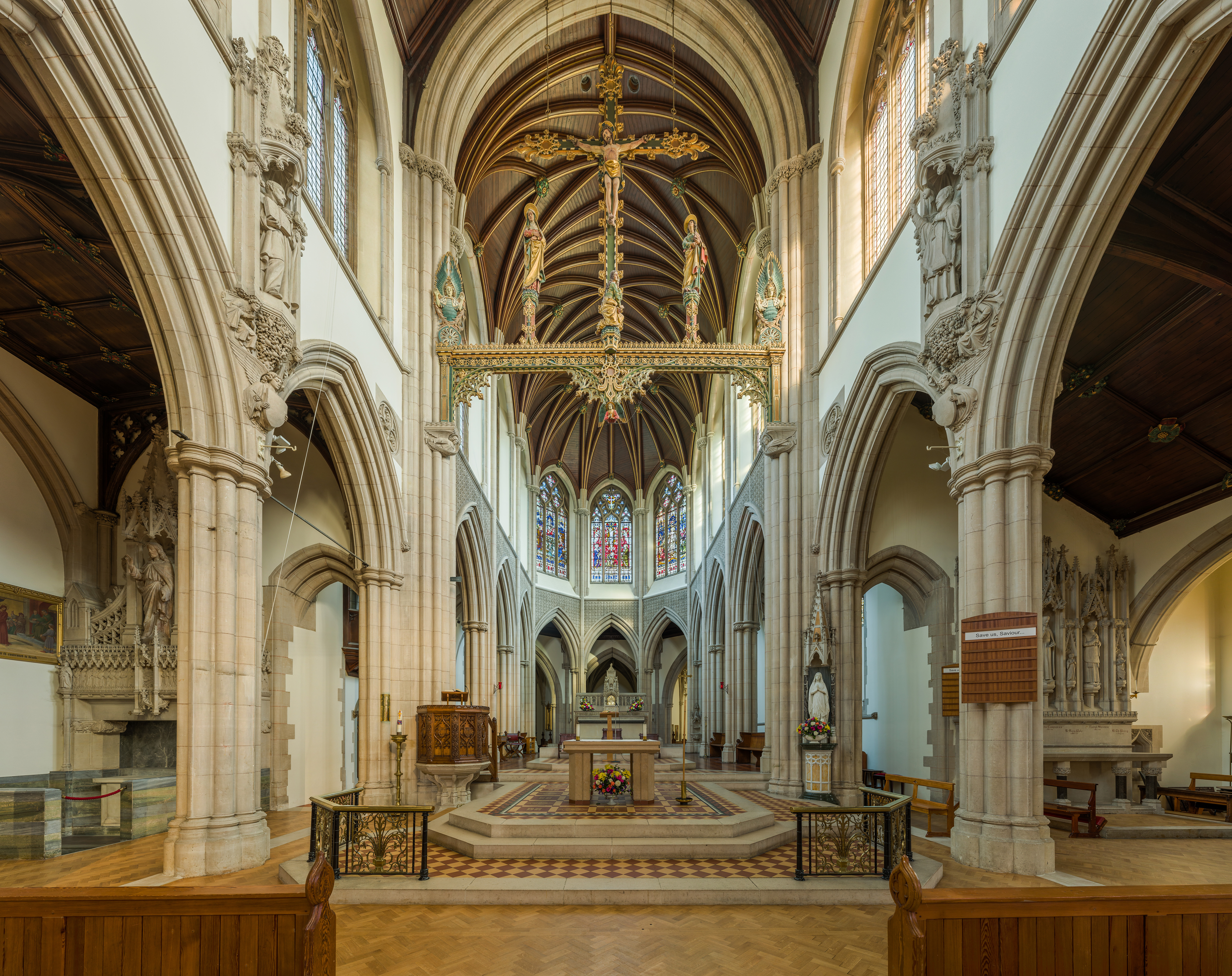
The sanctuary

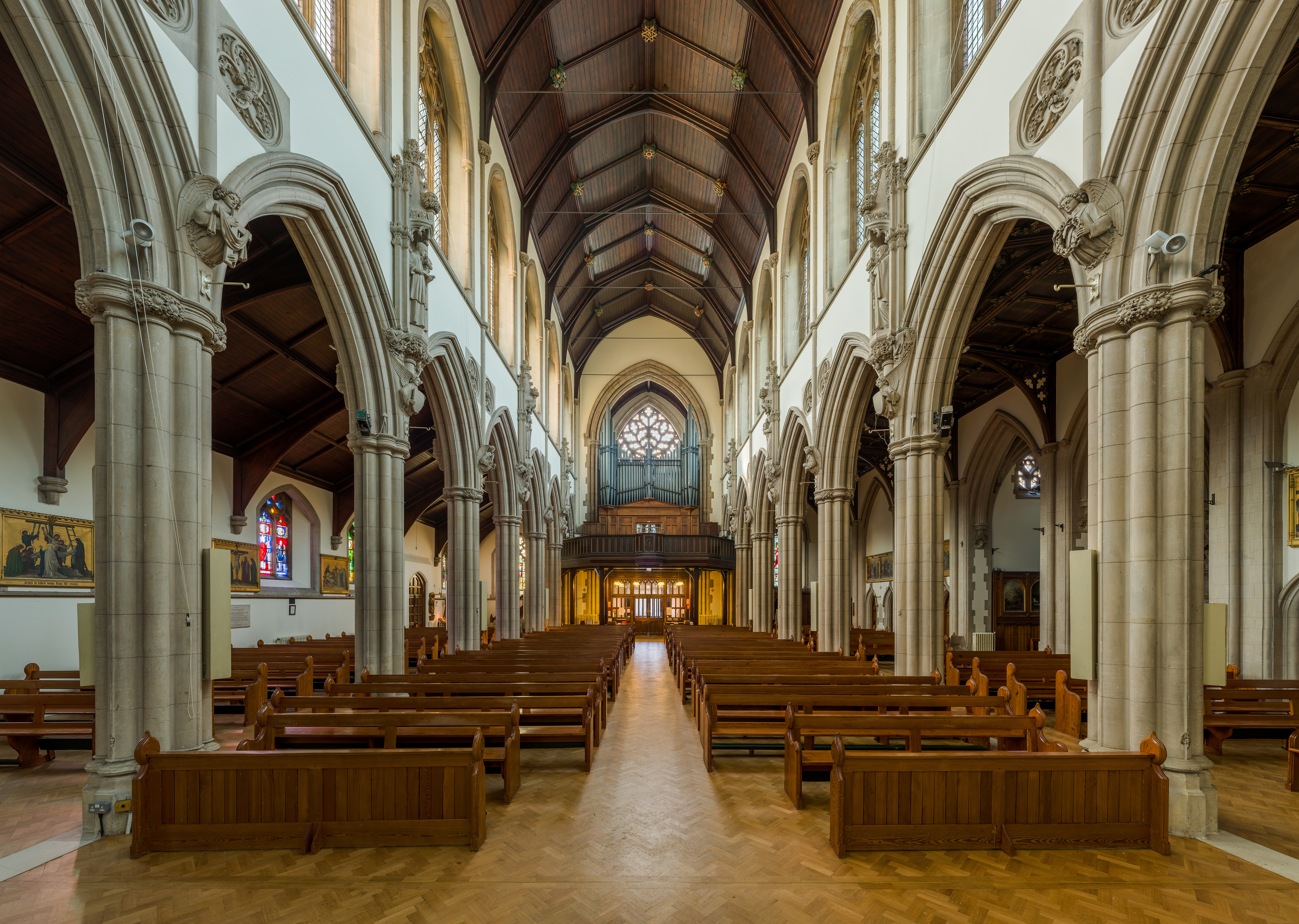
The nave looking south-west

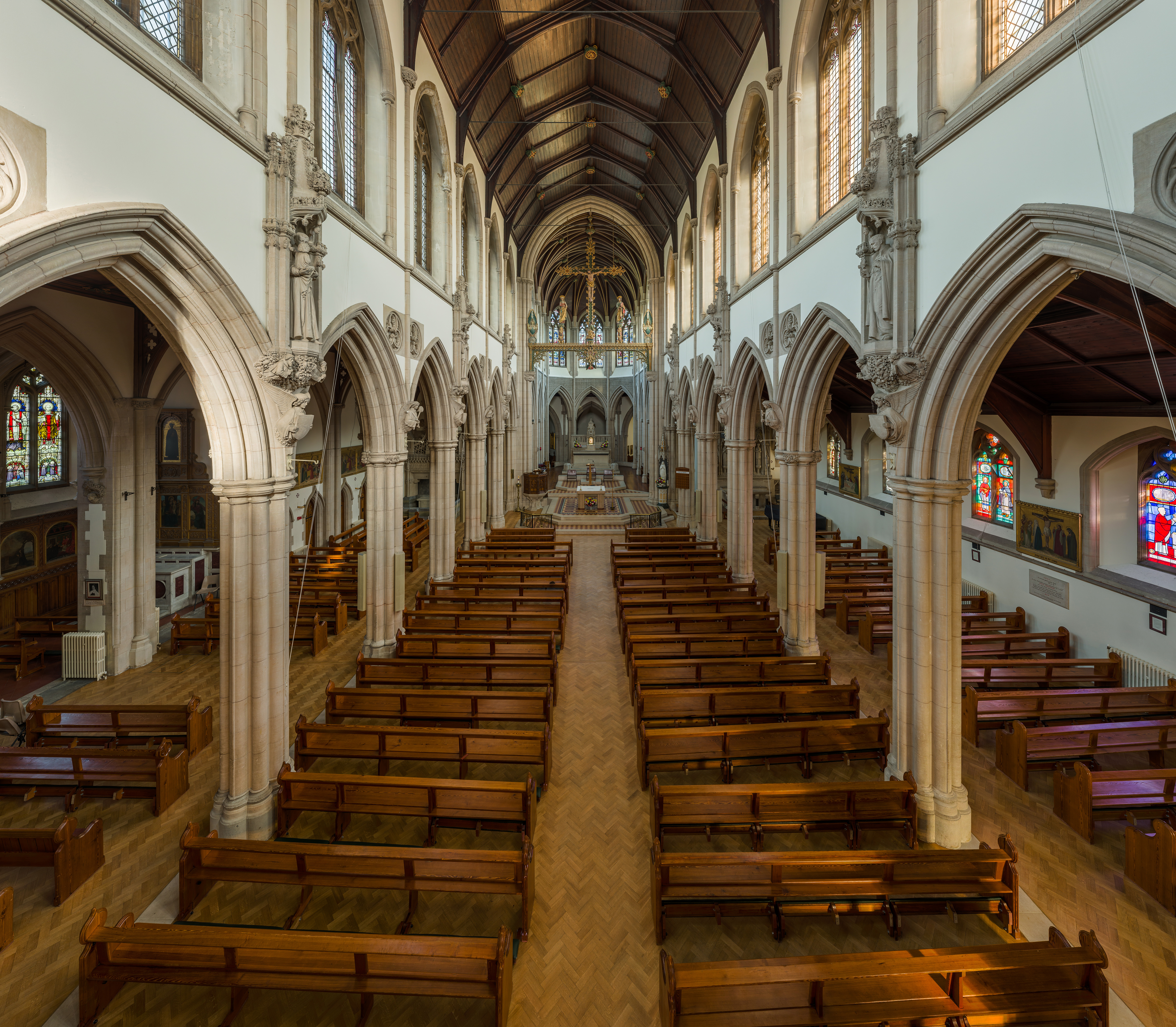
The nave from the organ gallery

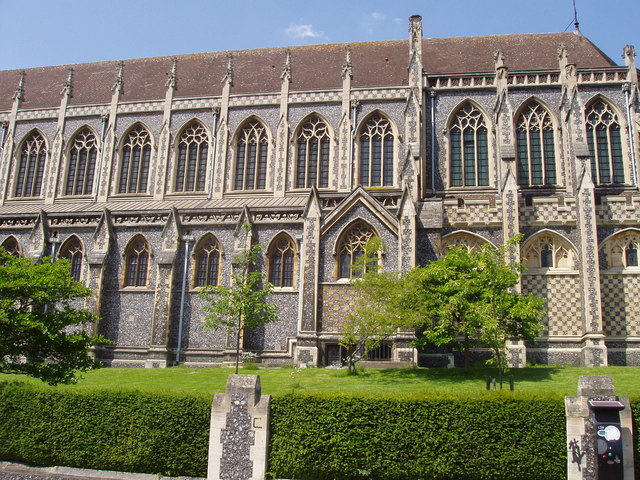
View from Darlaston Road

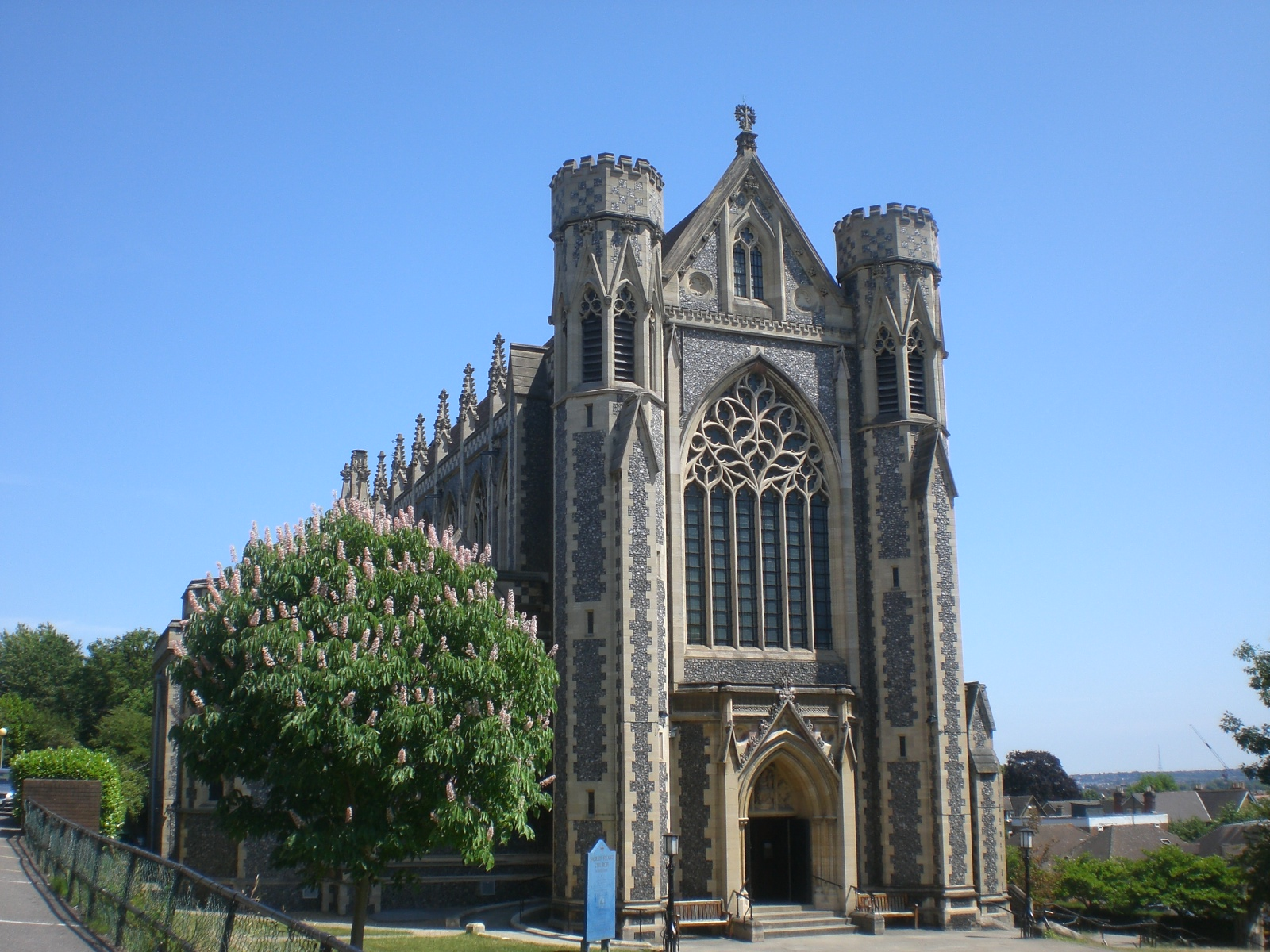
View from Edge Hill

== See also ==
- List of Jesuit sites
- List of Catholic churches in the United Kingdom
