= Edith Arendrup =

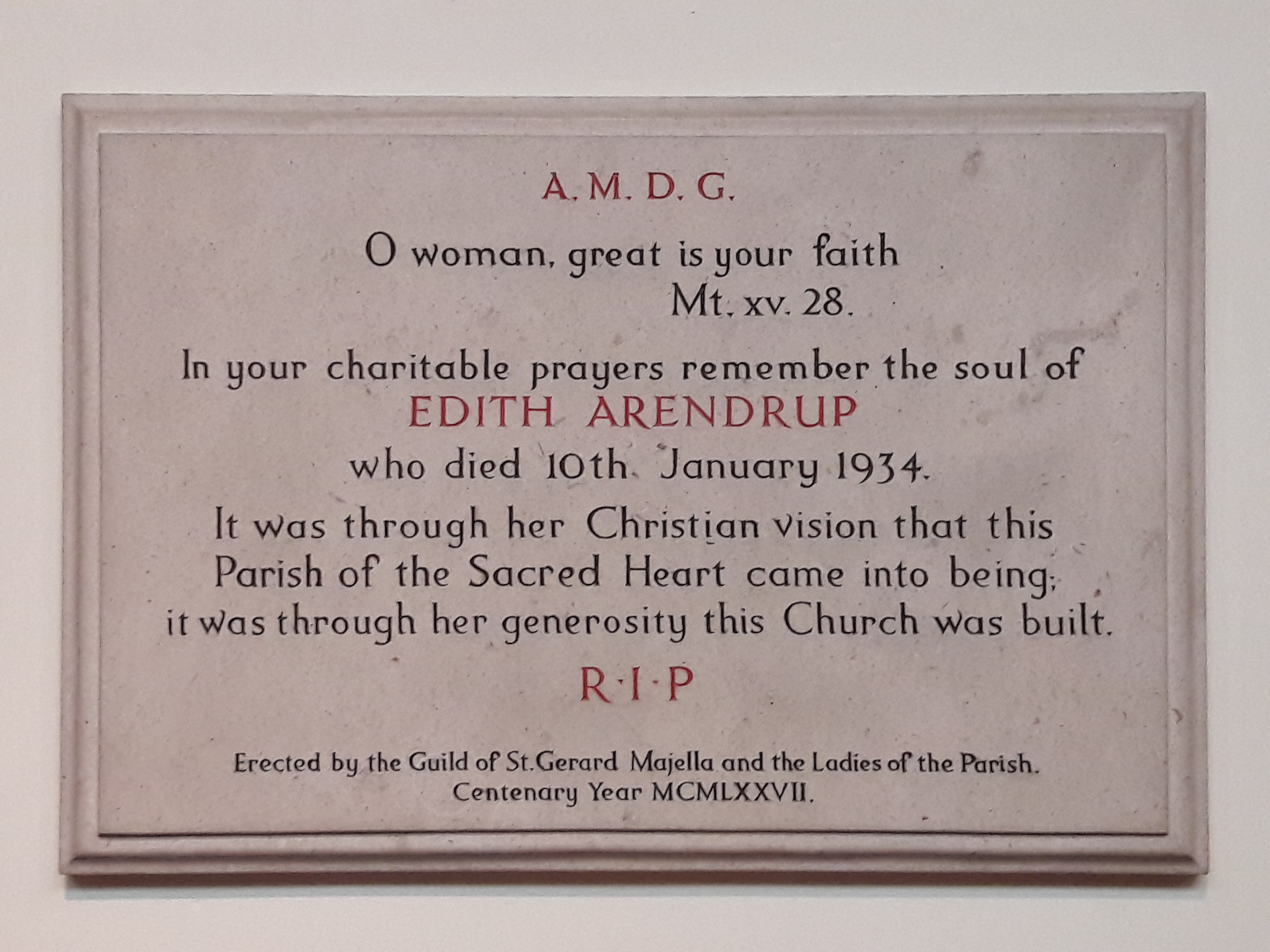
Plaque in Sacred Heart Church, Wimbledon.

Edith Mary Arendrup, née Courtauld (1 September 1846 – 10 January 1934) was an English artist and religious sister.

== Biography ==
She was born in Bocking, Essex, to John Minton Courtauld (died 1877), a member of the Courtaulds textile company family, and his wife Sarah, née Bromley. She spent one term at the National Art Training School in South Kensington, and painted in a studio owned by her uncle, the artist George Hering, where she also met and was advised by John Rogers Herbert.

In 1872 she married a widowed Danish army officer Adolph Arendrup (1834–1875), who she met on a holiday in Egypt, and they lived in Egypt until his death in 1875. They had a daughter, Agnes who died in infancy, and a son, Axel. Arendrup returned to England after her husband's death, with her son and two step-daughters, and settled in Wimbledon in south west London.

Both of Arendrup's parents died while she was young, her mother in a riding accident and her father in Switzerland in 1876. She had been brought up in the Unitarian faith but converted to Roman Catholicism around the time of the sudden death of her brother Julien in 1870. In 1877 she opened a Catholic chapel in her home, then a chapel and school, and by 1887 had bought the land and contributed substantially to the building costs of the Sacred Heart Church.

An advertisement in The Times of 21 May 1881 announces an exhibition of three of her works under the title "Christ's Appeal", displayed at Messrs Dowdeswells in New Bond Street, and quotes the Daily News's description of them as "Replete with religious sentiment of the loftiest and purest kind".

Her son Axel died of typhoid, in Madeira, in 1896. With no remaining family she sold her house, joined a religious order, and worked among the poor of London's East End.

In 1925, aged 75, she retired to her old home in Bocking, by this time a Franciscan convent and old people's home. She died there on 10 January 1934 and was buried in its grounds.

She is remembered locally as "A major supporter and benefactor of Catholics in Wimbledon", and in Madeira in the name of the Escola Arendrup, a school founded in 1899 by her friend Mary Jane Wilson (later the Venerable) to which she contributed funds in memory of her son after he died on the island.
