= Todd Longstaffe-Gowan =

British landscape architect

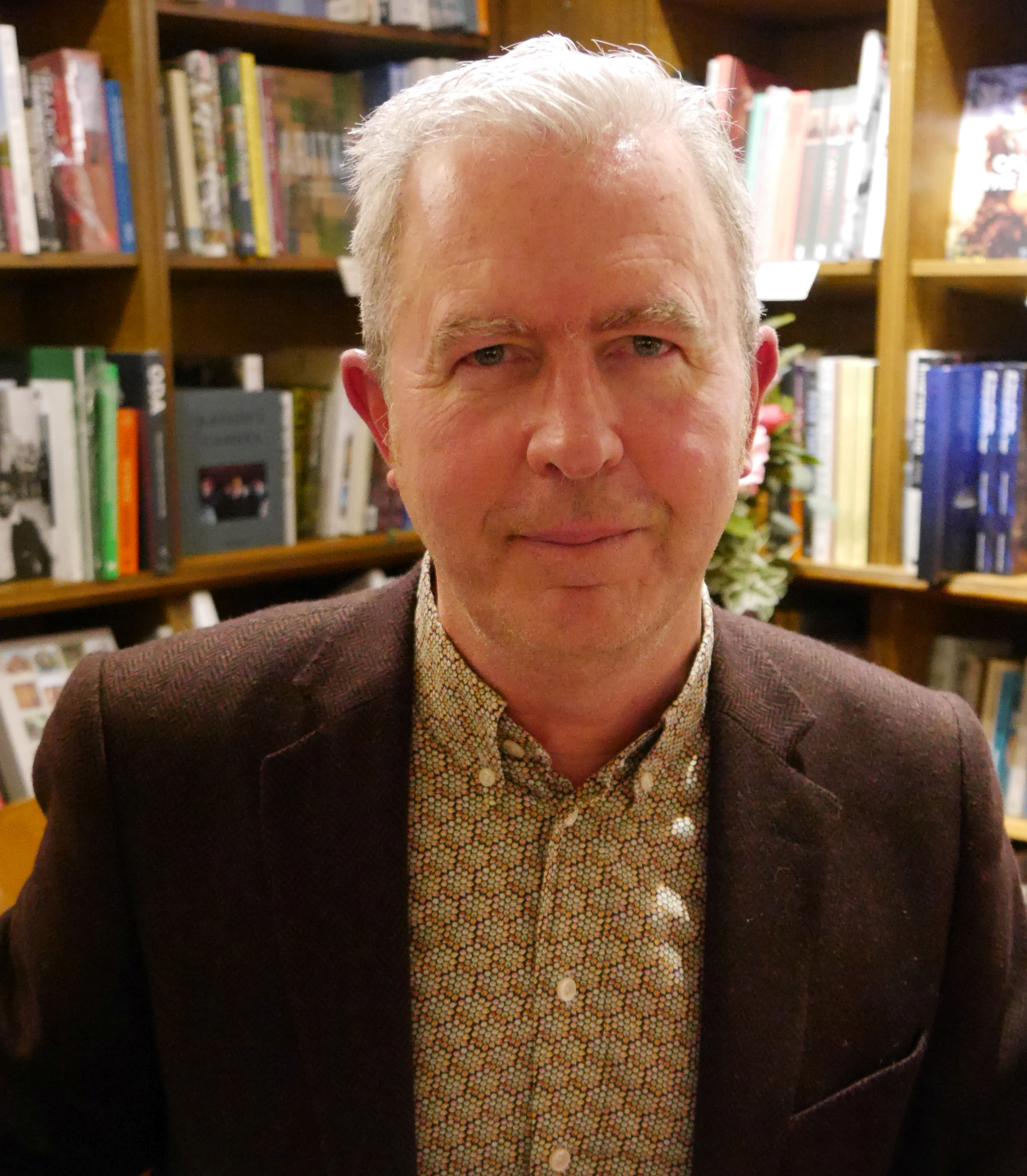
Longstaffe-Gowan at Hatchards London in 2024

Todd Longstaffe-Gowan is a British landscape architect and author.

He was born in Canada, but left when still a boy.

Longstaffe-Gowan studied Environmental Studies at the University of Manitoba, Landscape Architecture at Harvard University and completed his PhD in Historical Geography at University College London.

He wrote English Garden Eccentrics in 2022. His 2012 The London Square: Gardens in the Midst of Town was called "beautifully illustrated and lovingly researched history" in The Guardian.

In 2024, he published Lost Gardens of London with Modern Art Press.
