= Roehampton =

District in south-west London, England

Coordinates: 51.451°N 0.243°W

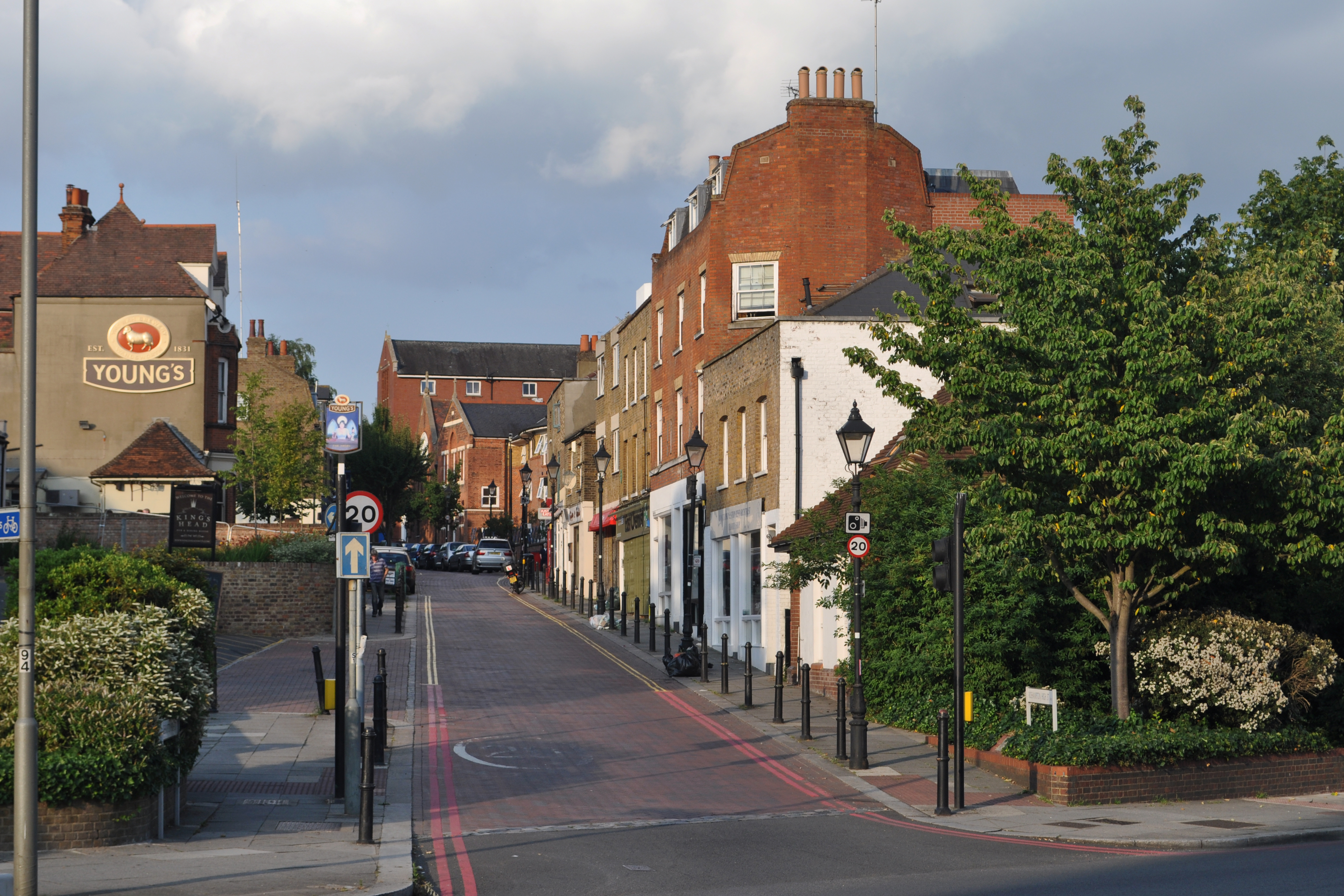
- Roehampton High Street

- Location within Greater London
- Population: 16,132 (2011 Ward of Roehampton and Putney Heath)
- OS grid reference: TQ225745
- London borough: Wandsworth
- Ceremonial county: Greater London
- Region: London
- Country: England
- Sovereign state: United Kingdom
- Post town: LONDON
- Postcode district: SW15
- Dialling code: 020
- Police: Metropolitan
- Fire: London
- Ambulance: London
- UK Parliament: Putney
- London Assembly: Merton and Wandsworth

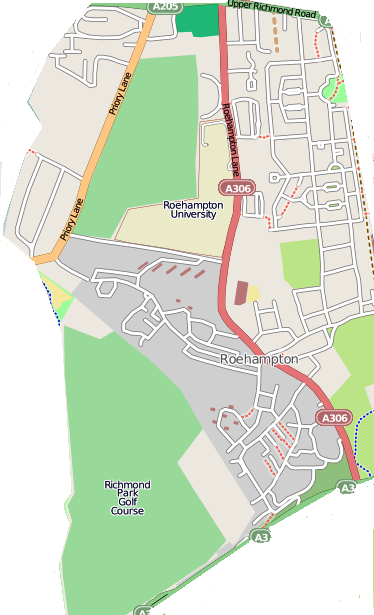
Map of Roehampton, excluding Roehampton/Putney Vale to the south

Roehampton is an area in southwest London, sharing its SW15 postcode with neighbouring Putney and Kingston Vale, and takes up a far western strip, running north to south, in the London Borough of Wandsworth. It contains a number of large council house estates and is home to the University of Roehampton.

== Etymology ==
The Roe in Roehampton's name is thought to refer to the large number of rooks that still inhabit the area.

== Location ==
Roehampton is centred about 6.3 miles (roughly 10 km) south-west of Charing Cross. It occupies high land, with Barnes to the north, Putney and Putney Heath to the east, and Richmond Park and Richmond Park Golf Course to the west. To the south is Roehampton Vale, which straddles the A3, with Wimbledon Common and Putney Vale beyond.

== Governance ==
Roehampton is part of the Putney constituency for elections to the House of Commons of the United Kingdom.

Roehampton is covered by the Roehampton ward for elections to Wandsworth London Borough Council.

== History ==
Roehampton was originally a small village – with only 14 houses during the reign of Henry VII – with the area largely forest and heath. The population gradually increased in the 18th and 19th centuries as it became a favoured residential outlying suburb for summer villas and larger houses set in parkland, following the opening of Putney Bridge in 1729. Several of the original houses survive.

Roehampton House (Grade I) by Thomas Archer was built between 1710 and 1712, and enlarged by Sir Edwin Lutyens in 1910. Until 2008, it was the administrative centre for Queen Mary's Hospital. The building was Grade I Listed in 1978 when it was still being used by the hospital. It was subsequently developed into private flats.

Parkstead House (Grade I), built in 1760 for William Ponsonby, 2nd Earl of Bessborough, was the home of the socialite Lady Caroline Lamb before being acquired in 1861 for use as a seminary by the Jesuits and renamed Manresa House. Gerard Manley Hopkins, the Jesuit poet, lived there. Parkstead House is now owned by Roehampton University, as are a number of other surviving 18th century houses. These include Mount Clare (Grade I) built in 1772 for George Clive, cousin of Lord Clive; Grove House (Grade II*), built originally for Sir Joshua Vanneck in 1777 – Capability Brown is reputed to have laid out the grounds; and Downshire House (Grade II*) built in 1770 and once occupied by the Marquess of Downshire.

Templeton House, a Georgian mansion, was built in the 1780s and its first resident was Lady Elizabeth Templetown. In 1930, the building was converted into student flats; during both World Wars, it was used as a hospital. From the winter of 1919 to the spring of 1920, Winston Churchill lived at Templeton House while it was owned by Freddie Guest and his wife Amy. After its sale in 2010, the new owners again converted the building into a single family home, with the exterior also restored. Some of the filming for series 3 of Downton Abbey was completed at Templeton House.

Originally a part of Putney Anglican parish, Roehampton became a separate parish in 1845, after the building of Holy Trinity Church on Roehampton Lane in 1842. The Society of Jesus founded St Joseph Church in Roehampton in 1869 from the novitiate that became Whitelands College.

The Maharajah Duleep Singh lived for a time in Ashburton House in Roehampton with the family of Sir John Spencer Login and Lady Lena Login. Lady Login wrote in her memoirs that the Prince Consort and the Prince of Wales visited him there on one occasion.

During World War I there was a Royal Naval Air Service Kite Balloon Training School based on land now part of the university and golf course.

Much of the old village of Roehampton still remains, dominated by large detached houses. An old watering trough for Victorian carriage-horses exists at the junction of Medfield Street and Roehampton Lane.

=== Council housing ===
The London County Council (LCC) built the Roehampton Estate in the 1920s and 1930s (later renamed the Dover House Estate) and the Alton Estate in the 1950s, covering many of the large gardens and woodlands in the area.

Dover House Estate is one of a number of important London County Council cottage estates inspired by the Garden City movement. The land was previously the estates of two large houses, Dover House and Putney Park House, which were purchased by the LCC soon after World War I. Dover House was demolished for the new estate, but Putney Park House remains. The common characteristic of the LCC cottage estates is picturesque housing influenced by the Arts and Crafts style. It was the intention at Dover House Estate to create housing in groups that overlooked or had access to open space, to provide a sense of intimacy and individuality, and the estate was laid out with communal green spaces. Allotments were also provided in three backland areas behind houses, two of which remain, the third subsequently infilled by housing.

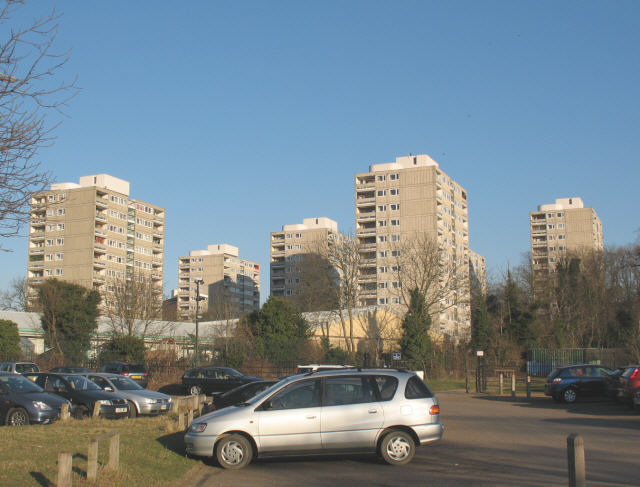
Some of the many high-rise blocks on the large Alton Estate

The Alton Estate, one of the largest council estates in the UK, occupies an extensive swathe of land west of Roehampton village and runs between Roehampton Lane and Richmond Park Golf Course. The estate has a mix of low and high-rise modernist architecture consisting of Alton East (1958) styled a subtle Scandinavian-influenced vernacular and its slightly later brutalist counterpart: Alton West (1959). At Highcliffe Drive on Alton West the LCC essentially retained the Georgian landscape and placed within it five ultra modern slab blocks: Binley, Winchfield, Dunbridge, Charcot and Denmead Houses, (all grade II*) inspired by Le Corbusier's Unite d'Habitation. At the time of its completion in 1958, Alton West was considered by many British architects to be the crowning glory of post-World War II council housing.

The estate is now part of a regeneration scheme with a number of government initiatives such as SureStart helping to tackle issues of poverty and social exclusion.

=== Recent history and today ===
Roehampton contains a number of conservation areas, covering much of the Alton and Dover House estates, and the centre of Roehampton Village. This includes the King's Head Inn, at the foot of Roehampton High Street and the Montague Arms, Medfield Street, both of 17th century origin.

In 2007, Justine Greening, the local Member of Parliament, secured a commitment to install a pedestrian entrance to Richmond Park from the Alton Estate. A footpath and cycleway from Chohole Gate to Richmond Park was opened in 2014.

Roehampton is home to a number of well-known educational institutions: the University of Roehampton has approximately 10,500 students housed in 4 colleges and around 4,000 students studying online; the new Queen Mary's Hospital with its renowned amputee rehabilitation centre opened in 2006 is a teaching centre for medical students based in Wandsworth NHS Primary Care Trust; Kingston University has one of its campuses in Roehampton Vale; South Thames College also has a campus on Roehampton Lane. It has long been a major centre for teacher-training, being the site of two constituent colleges (Digby Stuart College and Froebel College) of the former federal Roehampton Institute of Higher Education (now the University of Roehampton), as well as South East England's only lecturer-training college (Garnett College) which eventually moved and became part of the University of Greenwich.

Apart from education, other notable institutions based here include The Priory Clinic, the Bank of England Sports Centre, Rosslyn Park Rugby Football Club, and the Roehampton Club. The International Tennis Federation (ITF) moved to Roehampton from Baron's Court in 1998, and in 2007 the Lawn Tennis Association moved to a newly built headquarters next to the ITF.

== Demography ==
In the 2011 census, the Wandsworth ward of Roehampton and Putney Heath did not record a single majority ethnic group. The largest ethnicity in the ward was White British at 45%, followed by other White (18.4%), Black African (7.9%), and other Asian (4.6%).

In 2011, 59.1% of people living in Roehampton and Putney Heath were born in England. The other most common census responses were those born in Poland (5.6%), Pakistan (1.8%), Ireland (1.6%), the Philippines (1.6%), South Africa (1.2%), Ghana (1.1%), Germany (1.0%), and Somalia (1.0%).

The religious makeup of Roehampton and Putney Heath is 52.9% Christian, 23.6% no religion, 11.1% Muslim, 1.4% Hindu, 1.1% Buddhist, 0.7% Jewish, 0.4% Sikh, and 0.2% agnostic.

== Transport ==
Roehampton is served by bus route 170 (to Victoria), 265 (to Putney and Tolworth), 419 (to Richmond), 493 (to Richmond and Tooting), 430 (to South Kensington), 85 (to Putney and Kingston) and 969 (to Whitton, 1 trip on Tuesday and Friday Only).

Barnes and Putney are the nearest railway stations. Roehampton University has campaigned to have nearby Barnes station renamed Barnes & Roehampton, as the station is situated between the two areas.

== Depiction in fiction, film and television ==
Roehampton is an important location in H. G. Wells' novel The Sleeper Awakes. Roehampton, along with five other locations in London, including Wimbledon Park, Norwood, Blackheath and Shooter's Hill, form a series of rudimentary airports known as "Flying Stages". The Flying Stage at Roehampton is the scene for a major battle in the plot.

The Alton Estate has featured as a film and television location. Fahrenheit 451 (1966) used some of the estate as its backdrop for a bleak dystopian society of the future. Thames Television's film division Euston Films used the Danebury Avenue area of the estate to film the opening scenes of Sweeney 2 (1978), the sequel to the film Sweeney! (1977).

The band Busted also filmed parts of its music video for "Thats What I Go To School For" on Danebury Avenue, Roehampton, with the Alton Estate in the background.

== Notable residents ==
- James Beck (1929–1973), actor
- Sam Bird, racing driver
- Emily Blunt, actress
- Simon Le Bon, lead singer of Duran Duran
- Earl of Cork and Orrery, author
- Gwendolen Fitzalan-Howard, Duchess of Norfolk
- William Harvey, physician (discovered the principles of blood circulation)
- Jack Hawkins, actor
- Gerard Manley Hopkins, poet
- Roy Kinnear, actor
- Dawid Malan, cricketer (MCCC)
- Mildred Mansel, suffragette and organiser for the Women's Social and Political Union (WSPU)
- William Pitt the Younger, prime minister
- Brian Rix, farceur
- Ryan Sessegnon, footballer
- Sir Joseph Simpson, Commissioner of the Metropolitan Police
- Peter Westbury, racing driver

== Nearest places ==
Nearby major districts include:

- Mortlake
- Barnes
- Putney and Putney Heath
- Petersham
- Richmond
- East Sheen
- Southfields
- Wimbledon
- Kingston Vale
- Kingston
- New Malden
- Raynes Park

== Bibliography ==
- Putney and Roehampton, A Brief History The Putney Society, (1992)
- Putney and Roehampton Past D J Gerhold, (1994)
- Putney in 1636 Nicholas Lane's Map D J Gerhold, (1994)
- Villas and Mansions of Roehampton and Putney Heath D J Gerhold, (1997) ISBN 0905121058
- Roehampton in 1617 The Village Surveyed Dorian Gerhold, (2001)

== See also ==
- Ubuntu Museum: African Museum of Humanity
