= Kenneth Harrap =

British oncological biochemist

Professor Kenneth Harrap CBE CChem FRSC
- Born: Kenneth Reginald Harrap; 20 November 1931
- Died: 9 February 2017 (aged 85)
- Occupation: Oncological biochemist
- Employer: Institute of Cancer Research

Professor Kenneth Reginald Harrap CBE CChem FRSC (1931-2017) was a British oncological biochemist.

== Early life and education ==
Harrap was born in Streatham, London, on 20 November 1931. He was educated at Woking Grammar School and George Green's School, London.

He graduated with a BSc in Chemistry from the University of London, then worked for a while as an analytical chemist at Hopkins & Williams.

In 1964 He spent a sabbatical period as a visiting fellow at the Children's Cancer Research Foundation in Boston, United States.

He received a DSc in Pharmacology and Biochemistry from London University in 1977.

== Career ==
The early part of his career was directed at identifying biochemical abnormalities of cancer cells.

In 1956 he moved to the Institute of Cancer Research's Chester Beatty Research Institute in London. He was promoted to Head of the Department of Applied Biochemistry in 1970, Head of the Department of Biochemical Pharmacology in 1977, Chairman of the Drug Development Section in 1982, and Director of the CRC's Centre for Cancer Therapeutics in 1994.

Harrap chaired the British Association for Cancer Research from 1987 to 1990.

He was elected a Fellow of the Royal Society of Chemistry, and received the American Association for Cancer Research's Bruce F. Cain award and the Barnett Rosenberg Award, both in 1995. He was made a Commander of the Order of the British Empire (CBE) in the 1998 New Year Honours, "for services to cancer research".

He is credited with the discovery of Carboplatin, JM 216 (Satraplatin), and AMD 473.

=== Platinum based anti-cancer agents ===
A collaboration with Johnson Matthey established by Professor Tom Connors was expanded into an extensive search for an effective but less toxic therapy to replace Cisplatin.

JM8 was identified and successfully launched as Carboplatin (Paraplatin) by Bristol Myers Squibb in 1986. This achievement was recognized in 1991 with the Queens Award for Technological Achievement, awarded jointly to the Drug Development Section at the Institute of Cancer Research, of which Harrap was Head, to the Royal Marsden Hospital, and to Johnson.

=== Antimetabolite anticancer drugs ===
Harrap's interest in antimetabolites as cancer drugs led to a collaboration with AstraZeneca on the development of thymidylate synthase inhibitors. Raltitrexed was developed and launched as Tomudex.

Building on the work done by Harrap's group, thymidylate synthase has continued to be a target of interest for the development of anti cancer drugs. One of these, BGC 945, has been taken into clinical trial at the Royal Marsden, and licensed to Carrick for further clinical development.

== Retirement ==
Harrap became emeritus professor of pharmacology at the University of London, a distinguished emeritus fellow of the Cancer Research Campaign, and an associate and visiting scientist at the Institute of Cancer Research on his retirement in 1997. He was profiled as the "Cover Legend" in volume 58, issue 21 (November 1998) of the journal Cancer Research, which featured his portrait photograph on its front page and described him as "one of Britain's top leaders in the field of cancer chemotherapy".

Harrap joined his wife Dr. Beverley Weston to form Weston and Harrap Consulting, advising start up and small biotech companies on cancer drug development and commercial potential.

He died on 9 February 2017. He was survived by his wife, two daughters, and grandchildren.`

The University of London's Harrap Chair of Pharmacology and Therapeutics is endowed in his honour. A blue plaque commemorating the work of the Institute for Cancer Research, including the discovery of Carboplatin, was erected by the Royal Society of Chemistry in 2018. Beverley Weston was one of the speakers at the event.
