= Elizabeth Iorns =

- Born: December 31, 1980 (age 45); Melbourne, Australia
- Education: University of Auckland; Institute of Cancer Research (University of London); University of Miami
- Known for: Founder and CEO of Science Exchange
- Awards: Nature's 10 (2012)
- Scientific career
- Thesis: High throughput functional analysis for the identification of breast cancer targets (2008)
- Doctoral advisor: Alan Ashworth
- Website: elizabethiorns.com

Elizabeth Jane Iorns (born 31 December 1980) is a New Zealand scientist, entrepreneur and researcher, and the founder and CEO of Science Exchange, a Silicon Valley startup which operates a platform to allow scientists to outsource their research to scientific institutions such as university facilities or commercial contract research organizations. Science Exchange has received considerable media attention since it first launched in August 2011, particularly following its participation in the Y Combinator incubator program in Summer 2011 and its role in launching the Reproducibility Initiative in Summer 2012. Iorns has been profiled in many leading publications including Nature, FastCompany, the San Francisco Business Times and Xconomy. Iorns lives in Palo Alto, California, where Science Exchange is now headquartered.

== Education and early life ==
Iorns was born in Melbourne, Australia, and was primarily raised in Hawkes Bay, New Zealand. She holds a first-class honors degree in Biomedical Science from the University of Auckland and a Ph.D. in Cancer Biology from The Institute of Cancer Research, a constituent college of the University of London. She was supervised by Alan Ashworth and her thesis was titled High throughput functional analysis for the identification of breast cancer targets.

== Career and research ==
Iorns completed a postdoctoral research Fellowship at the University of Miami Miller School of Medicine. In 2008 she received the Young Investigator Award from the Expedition Inspiration Fund for Breast Cancer Research for her work characterizing Breast Stem Cells for the Identification of Cancer Stem Cell Specific Therapeutic Targets. In 2010, Iorns was promoted to Assistant Professor of Medicine at the University of Miami Miller School of Medicine.

Iorns' research focuses on identifying mechanisms of breast cancer development and progression. She has several high impact publications in the field.

Iorns has been a longtime spokesperson on the issue of reproducibility in academic research. In August 2012 she helped launch the Reproducibility Initiative, a program developed to assist researchers in validating their findings by repeating their experiments through independent laboratories.

=== Entrepreneurial and investment career ===
Iorns is the founder and CEO of Science Exchange. Iorns conceived of the idea for Science Exchange while at the University of Miami Miller School of Medicine. She needed to conduct immunology experiments, but had difficulty finding potential collaborators or providers to work with. She formed Science Exchange with two co-founders (Ryan Abbott and Dan Knox) in May 2011. In 2012 Iorns was recognized by the Kauffman Foundation for her role in starting Science Exchange.

Iorns is also a part-time partner of Y Combinator and leads the accelerator's biotech practice. In addition, Iorns is a mentor at IndieBio, an accelerator focusing life sciences established by SOSV in 2014.

=== Awards and honors ===
In December 2012, Iorns was recognized by the scientific journal Nature as one of the "Ten People that Mattered in 2012" for her role in launching the Reproducibility Initiative. In May 2013, Iorns was named, along with co-founders Ryan Abbott and Dan Knox, as "Tech’s Most Inspiring New Founder" by SV Angel’s David Lee. In June 2013, Iorns was mentioned as one of the "50 Women Who Are Changing The World" by WIRED. In May 2014, Iorns was one of six female entrepreneurs to receive the Glamstarter Award from Glamour Magazine.
