= Tom Connors =

Tom Connors may refer to:

- Stompin' Tom Connors (1936–2013), Canadian country and folk singer-songwriter
- Tom Connors (research scientist) (1934–2002), British cancer research scientist
