= OPENCities =

British Council Spain project

- Product type: International
- Current owner: British Council
- Introduced: 2008

OPENCities is a project initiated by British Council Spain, to help cities to become more open and competitive. OPENCities demonstrates how international populations contribute to cities long-term economic success and advocates for openness as a way forward for cities willing to play an international role. It has developed a tool to benchmark and analyse openness (the OPENCities Monitor). Overall, the project's goal is to highlight the importance of openness for cities' international success and competitiveness.

== Purpose ==
Worldwide people are migrating to cities and by 2050 two thirds of the world population will live in urban areas, and as of 2023, 57% already do. This growing urbanisation, together with the commercial and economic globalisation results in increasingly diverse population. The importance of human capital and human creativity as one of the key location factors explaining sustainable economic long-term growth is significant and rising, with urban regions competing globally to attract the highly qualified and talented labour. Cities must therefore be attractive and open. They must provide a tolerant environment for talents and technology (Richard Florida) to attract and retain these international population groups. OPENCities identifies the link between international migration and economic growth, measures the multidimensional phenomenon of openness and provides qualitative recommendations towards internationalisation, integration and diversity policies on local level.

== Definition of openness ==
In the context of the OPENCities project, openness is defined as “the capacity of a city to attract international populations and to enable them to contribute to the future success of the city”. As openness is a multi-dimensional phenomenon it can be hardly measured. During the OPENCities Monitor feasibility study conducted by BAK Economics, 54 indicators were identified to measure openness towards international populations in quantitative as well as qualitative terms. These indicators were mainly chosen due to their international availability and comparability on city or regional level.

These indicators capture inputs and overall conditions as well as outputs or outcomes. They also take into account the perception of international migration groups regarding immigration policy or the value of ethnic diversity. Later on, they are aggregated into 11 areas with different weightings, namely:

- Migration
- Freedom
- Barriers of entry
- Quality of Living
- International presence
- Education
- International flows
- Infrastructure
- International events
- Standard of living
- Diversity actions

The different weightings of the indicator results are based on a survey conducted by BAK Economics among 140 respondents in 16 cities. The weights were apportioned due to the relative importance and the validity as well as availability of the indicators.

== Organisation of OPENCities ==
OPENCities is a British Council project. The European Union (EU), funded an URBACT project, led by Belfast City Council, with the following partners Bilbao, Bucharest, Cardiff, Dublin, Düsseldorf, Nitra, Poznań, Sofia and Vienna. Outside URBACT, other cities have been active partners (Madrid, Cardiff) and collaborators (Edinburgh, Manchester, Newcastle, Nottingham). Besides, others have been included in the OPENCities Monitor and participated in different ways: London, Toronto, São Paulo, Auckland, Barcelona, Beijing, Belfast, Buenos Aires, Cape Town, Chongqing, Los Angeles and New York.

== History ==
The story of OPENCities started in 2008 with the fundamental work of Greg Clark “Towards OPEN Cities” showcasing the importance of openness as a location factor, the trends in demographic changes in cities, the opportunities that measurement and benchmarking of openness could present and initial policy recommendations. Since 2008, OPENCities moved forward as follows:

- April 2008 – OPENCities selected to receive URBACT funding.
- March 2009 - End 2010 – Elaboration of local action plans by URBACT partner cities, implementation of cultural activities in cities, dissemination of project outcomes.
- April 2008 - Mid 2009 – Feasibility study conducted by BAK Economics, stating that openness can be measured through internationally comparable indicators.
- Mid 2009-Oct 2010 – Investigation, research, case studies, OPENCities Monitor, available to international cities.
- End 2010 – International recognition of the importance of openness for cities international success and competitiveness.
- Jan/Feb 2011 – Launch of OPENCities Monitor.

== The OPENCities Monitor ==
The OPENCities Monitor developed by BAK Economics currently displays and demonstrates the results of 26 cities worldwide, compares their performance in several ways and gives further policy recommendations. An extended city-sample is up-coming in 2012. It is planned to include more than 100 cities in the OPENCities Monitor. Cities currently included are Auckland, Barcelona, Beijing, Belfast, Bilbao, Bucharest, Buenos Aires, Cape Town, Cardiff, Chongqing, Dublin, Düsseldorf, Edinburgh, London, Los Angeles, Madrid, Manchester, New York City, Nitra, Newcastle, Nottingham, Poznań, São Paulo, Sofia, Toronto and Vienna.

== Target groups of OPENCities ==
The target group of OPENCities are local policy leaders. OPENCities introduced openness as the focus in which to base local action plans, centred in three areas:

- Internationalisation
- Leadership and Governance
- Migration management

The OPENCities project supports their implementation and development. City leaders get access to relevant city data, can benchmark their results and obtain recommendations to improve their policies. The project highlights that attracting international talent brings economic welfare as well as social diversity. Cities must be very careful to highlight the importance of human rights, diversity and integration campaigns of NGOs on the local policy level and must make migrants participate and regard their specific needs and contributions in the city.

Researchers find here a platform for publishing and accessing articles and reports. Responsible media can use OPENCities to find reports that help them to communicate the importance of migration in cities, particularly the importance to minimise social clashes in times of economic recession.

Finally, business is an essential element, as they are in need of talent and innovation and have huge vested interest in ensuring that the city is open to diversity.

== See also ==
- City
- Cultural diversity
- Openness
- Quality of life
