= Michael Holman (priest) =

Catholic Jesuit priest and educator

Michael Holman SJ is a Catholic Jesuit priest and educator. He was principal of Heythrop College, University of London from 2012 to 2017. Prior to this he was the Provincial of the Jesuits in Britain and was formerly Headmaster of Wimbledon College.

He was born and brought up in Wimbledon, south London, where he was educated by the Jesuits, at Donhead and at Wimbledon College.

Holman entered the novitiate of the Society of Jesus in 1974 and was ordained priest in the Sacred Heart Church, Wimbledon, in 1988. He studied at Heythrop College, University of London; Campion Hall, Oxford; The Weston Jesuit School of Theology, Cambridge, Massachusetts; and Fordham University, New York, and holds degrees in Philosophy, Theology and Education Administration.

In addition to Wimbledon College, where he was headmaster from 1995 to 2004, Holman has worked in Jesuit schools in Glasgow and Sheffield. While completing his final year of training in 1995, he worked for six months as a prison and hospital chaplain in Guyana.
