= Richard Regan =

Richard David Regan OBE is a Past Sheriff of the City of London.

Educated at Wimbledon College, Regan was Master of the Worshipful Company of Cutlers in 2002 and 2003 and is an active member of two past Masters Associations. He was elected to the Court of Commons Council, and he has served as Deputy Chairman of Governors of the City of London School for Girls and King Edwards School, Witley and Deputy Chairman of the Standards Committee of the City of London Corporation.

He was elected a Sheriff of the City of London in 2006.

Regan was appointed Officer of the Order of the British Empire (OBE) in the 2013 Birthday Honours for services to the City of London Corporation and for voluntary service in London.
