= Institute of Cancer Research =

Public research institute in London, England

Coordinates: 51.34435°N 0.18921°W

The Institute of Cancer Research
- Type: Public
- Established: 1909
- Parent institution: University of London
- Endowment: £2.07 million (2023)
- Budget: £138.7 million (2022/23)
- Chairman: Julia Buckingham
- Chancellor: The Princess Royal (University of London)
- Chief Executive: Kristian Helin
- Academic staff: 895 (2022/23)
- Administrative staff: 275 (2022/23)
- Students: 370 (2024/25)
- Postgraduates: 370 (2024/25)
- Location: London, United Kingdom
- Campus: Urban
- Website: icr.ac.uk

The Institute of Cancer Research (the ICR) is a public research institute and a member institution of the University of London in London, United Kingdom, specialising in oncology. It was founded in 1909 as a research department of the Royal Marsden Hospital and joined the University of London in 2003. It has been responsible for a number of breakthrough discoveries, including that the basic cause of cancer is damage to DNA.

The ICR occupies sites in Chelsea, Central London and Sutton, southwest London. The ICR provides both taught postgraduate degree programmes and research degrees and currently has around 340 students. Together with the Royal Marsden Hospital the ICR forms the largest comprehensive cancer centre in Europe, and was ranked second amongst all British higher education institutions in the Times Higher Education's assessment of the 2021 Research Excellence Framework. In clinical medicine, 97% and in biological sciences, 99% of the ICR's academic research was assessed to be world leading or internationally excellent (4* or 3*).

The annual income of the institution for 2022–23 was £138.7 million of which £64.6 million was from research grants and contracts, with an expenditure of £134.9 million. The ICR receives its external grant funding from the government body the Higher Education Funding Council for England, from government research council bodies and from charities including the Wellcome Trust, Cancer Research UK, Breast Cancer Now and Bloodwise. It also receives voluntary income from legacies and from public and corporate donations. The ICR also runs a number of fundraising appeals and campaigns which help support a variety of cancer research projects.

== Sites ==
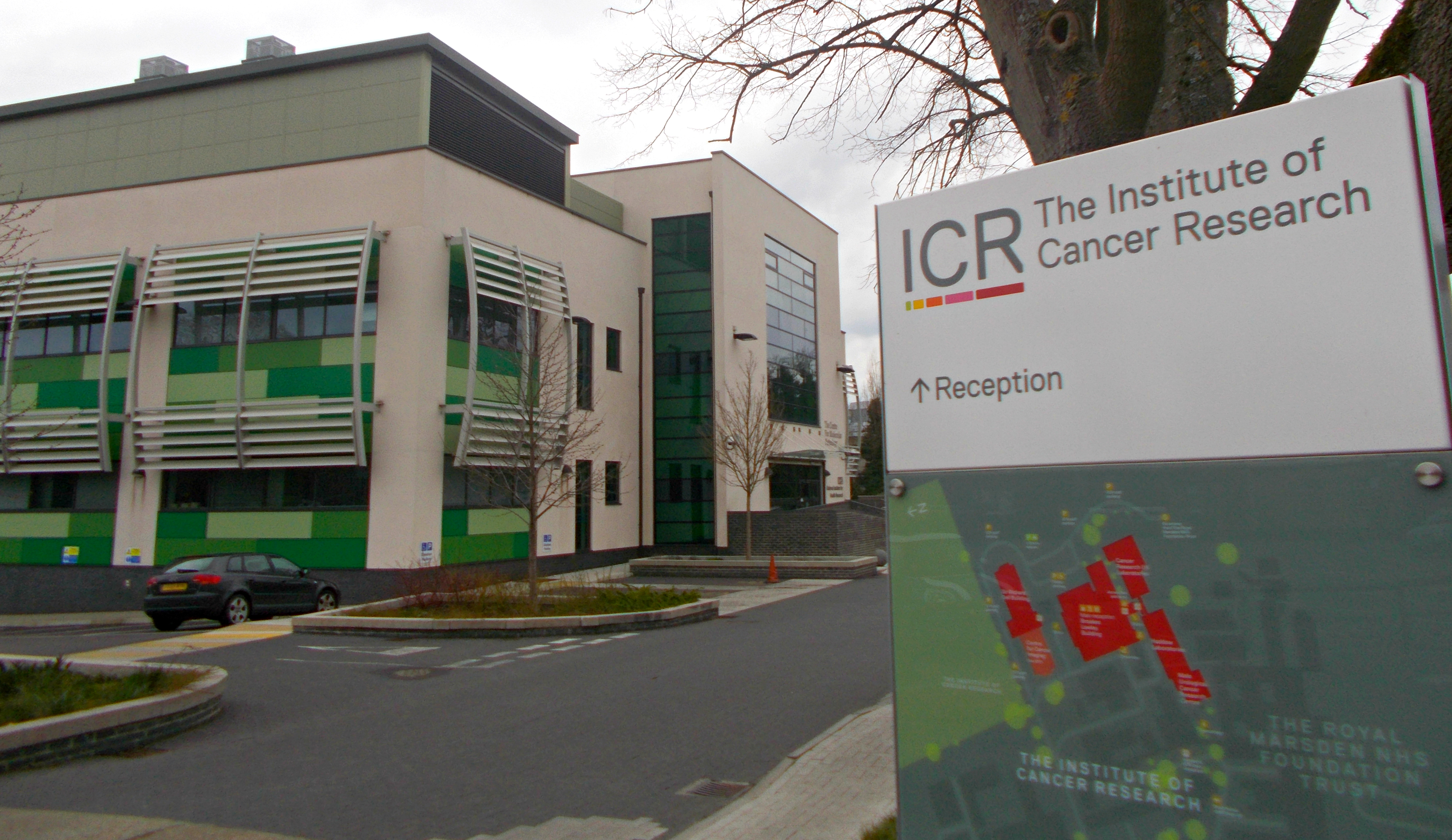
Institute of Cancer Research, Sutton

The ICR occupies two sites in Chelsea, Central London which include the Chester Beatty Laboratories and the ICR corporate offices. A third site in Sutton, Southwest London, houses more research facilities. The location of the two research sites reflects the two sites of the Royal Marsden Hospital.

== Research ==
The ICR pursues its research focused into three main research themes: genetic epidemiology, molecular pathology, and therapeutic development. These areas of research are essential for the development of personalised cancer medicine.

Towards this aim, the ICR and The Royal Marsden have completed a dedicated £17 million Centre for Molecular Pathology (CMP) which opened on the Sutton site on 20 November 2012. The centre exploits the increasing availability of information about the genetic make-up of different cancer types, in order to design new "personalised" treatments that target cancers' specific molecular defects. The CMP also aims to develop molecular diagnostic techniques that will accurately predict who will benefit most from a treatment, ensuring a patient receives the optimum drug(s) for the best possible outcome. The CMP will build on the organisations' existing expertise in breast, prostate and paediatric cancers, while providing opportunities for new developments in other cancers such as gastrointestinal, renal, gynaecological, melanoma, head & neck cancers and sarcomas.

In March 2016, the ICR opened a £20 million Centre for Cancer Imaging that brings together experts in a range of different imaging techniques working together to develop better cancer diagnostic and treatment techniques.

The organisation's research direction is set out in the ICR Scientific Strategy 2010–2015, which aims to develop key research areas while enhancing partnership affiliations. Its four objectives are to maintain, develop and exploit the unique relationship with the Marsden; to ensure a balanced portfolio of basic and applied research; to develop treatment regimes to the genetic makeup of patient and tumour (personalised medicine) and to recruit, retain and motivate the best staff.

== Teaching ==
The ICR runs an MSc in Oncology programme, which is a modular course aimed primarily at Specialist Registrars in Clinical and Medical Oncology. The course has exit points at Certificate, Diploma and MSc degree level.

== History ==
=== 1909 to 1970 ===
The ICR was founded in 1909, when a new laboratory building adjoining The Cancer Hospital (later named the Royal Marsden Hospital) was established with Alexander Paine as its first director. In 1910 Robert Knox was appointed to head the Electrical and Radio-therapeutic Department at The Cancer Hospital and established the first professionally designed X-ray Department for treatment and diagnosis in Britain. The Cancer Hospital Research Institute was officially opened by Prince Arthur, the Duke of Connaught, in 1911. In 1921 Archibald Leitch was appointed director of The Cancer Hospital Research Institute. The institute became a postgraduate School of the University of London in 1927. In 1931 Sir Ernest Kennaway FRS became director of the institute. In 1932 a research team led by Kennaway fractionated coal tar and isolated benzo[a]pyrene, which he identified as one of the chemical constituents that induced cancer in mice. These were the first research findings to show that a pure chemical substance can cause cancer. In 1936 Kennaway proposed the potential of a link between smoking and lung cancer. The Cancer Hospital Research Institute moved to a new site on Fulham Road in Chelsea in 1939 and was renamed the Chester Beatty Research Institute.

In 1946 Sir Alexander Haddow FRS FRSE (1907–1976) became the director of the Chester Beatty Research Institute. He remained in the role until 1969, In 1947, while conducting research at the institute, David Galton became the first physician in the world to use aminopterin (the forerunner of the methotrexate drug) in the treatment of adult leukaemia, producing remission in some cancer patients.

During the 1940s Haddow established a Clinical Chemotherapy Research Unit – the first such unit in Europe – in partnership with the Royal Marsden Hospital and under Galton's leadership. The partnership was unique at the time in being able to take the drug discoveries directly into a partner hospital for clinical trials in cancer patients. The unit led to the institute's discovery of three successful chemotherapy drugs in the 1950s: busulphan (Myleran), chlorambucil (Leukeran) and melphalan (Alkeran).

In 1952 the ICR's Eric Boyland had proposed that certain chemicals that cause cancer (carcinogens) react with DNA through an alkylation mechanism that damaged the DNA molecule. In follow-up research at the ICR in 1964, Professors Peter Brookes and Philip Lawley proved that chemical carcinogens act by damaging DNA, leading to mutations and the formation of tumours, proving that cancer is a genetic disease based on mutational events.

In 1954 the institute was officially renamed The Institute of Cancer Research (ICR). The ICR established a second campus in Sutton, Surrey, in 1956. Whilst working at the ICR in 1961, Jacques Miller discovered the immunological role of the thymus, as the repository of a special class of lymphocytes (T cells) essential for the mounting of an immune response.

=== 1970 to 2000 ===
Scientists at the ICR were instrumental in the development of one of the world's most widely used anti-cancer drugs, carboplatin (Paraplatin). Carboplatin's development began in 1970 after scientists in the United States discovered that the platinum-based compound cisplatin was effective against many tumours – but had serious side-effects. A team of ICR and RMH scientists and clinicians including Professors Kenneth Harrap and Tom Connors, Hilary Calvert and Hospital Consultant Eve Wiltshaw recognised its potential but also the need for a less toxic alternative. In collaboration with the chemical and precious metal company Johnson Matthey plc the ICR scientists evaluated some 300 different platinum-containing molecules and developed a series of second-generation compounds, of which carboplatin was selected as the lead. The first clinical trial of carboplatin was carried out in 1981 and it was launched commercially as Parplatin (manufactured by Bristol-Myers) in 1986. As of 2012 carboplatin is in use for a range of cancers including ovarian and lung. For the development of these platinum-based anticancer drugs the ICR, together with The Royal Marsden Hospital and Johnson Matthey plc, received the Queen's Award for Technological Achievement in 1991.

During the 1980s ICR scientists including Professors Hilary Calvert, and Ken Harrap and Ann Jackman developed raltitrexed (Tomudex) at the ICR, a drug active for the treatment of colon and other cancers. In 1983 research teams at the Chester Beatty Laboratory of the ICR led by Professors Chris Marshall FRS and Alan Hall FRS discovered N-RAS, one of the first human cancer transforming genes (oncogenes). Alan Hall went on in 1992 to discover that the molecular mechanism for the motility behaviour of animal cells (cell to cell attachment and cell movement) is through control of cytoskeletal assembly by specific GTPase-proteins, known as Rho and Rac. The discovery is of fundamental significance in cancer research since cell motility is a key feature of cancer cell behaviour during metastasis (the spread of tumours around the human body).

In 1994 an ICR team led by Michael Stratton discovered the gene BRCA2, which has been linked to breast cancer, prostate cancer and ovarian cancer. Alan Ashworth's team in the Breakthrough Breast Cancer Research Centre at the ICR established the connection between mutations in the BRCA2 gene and the operation of DNA repair pathways in cancer cells. This later led to the development of a PARP inhibitor drug, olaparib, which targets the DNA repair pathways of cancer cells. A Phase I trial of olaparib found in June 2009 that tumours shrank or stabilised for more than half of patients with BRCA1 and BRCA2 mutations. It is believed that the drug may also be useful in other patients whose cancer it is linked to an error in their DNA repair pathway.

In 1999 the Chester Beatty Laboratory in Chelsea was redeveloped and extended to incorporate the Breakthrough Toby Robins Breast Cancer Research Centre, which was opened by the Prince of Wales in 1999.

=== 2000 to present ===
In 2000 Michael Stratton at the ICR initiated the Cancer Genome Project, which was aimed at capitalizing on the knowledge from the Human Genome sequence to screen all human genes in cancer cells to identify those genes responsible for specific cancers. The project was established at the genome sequencing facilities of the Wellcome Trust Sanger Institute near Cambridge, of which Stratton is now the director. One of the first major achievements of the Cancer Genome Project has been the characterisation of the cancer gene BRAF in collaboration with ICR scientists Professors Chris Marshall and Richard Marais. The research by the ICR team, published in June 2002, revealed that damage to the BRAF gene could cause up to 70 per cent of melanoma skin cancers. This has been instrumental in speeding up the development of new drugs for the treatment of melanoma. Since 2002 the ICR has been working to develop drugs that inhibit BRAF in melanoma and other cancers where the gene is defective.

In the five years from 2004/05, the ICR developed on average two drug development candidates per year. Since 2006, it has licensed three novel series of anti-cancer drugs to major pharmaceutical companies: Hsp90 inhibitors to Novartis, PKB inhibitors to AstraZeneca and PI3Kinase inhibitors to Genentech. The PIl3Kinase inhibitor GDC-0941, licensed to Genentech by Piramed, is thought to have potential in a range of human cancers. In laboratory experiments, ICR scientists found that the drug reduced the growth of glioblastoma (the most common form of brain tumour), it decreased the growth of ovarian tumours and in other studies, it was active against cell lines derived from other human cancers.

In conjunction with The Royal Marsden NHS Foundation Trust, the ICR tested a promising new prostate cancer drug called abiraterone, which it discovered and developed. A randomised placebo-controlled Phase III trial reported in October 2010 that abiraterone could extend survival in some men with late stage prostate cancer. The trial, funded by Janssen Pharmaceutical Companies, included 1,195 patients from 13 countries whose advanced prostate cancer had stopped responding to standard therapies. Abiraterone extended the average overall survival of patients from 10.9 months to 14.8 months compared to a placebo, without many of the unpleasant side-effects associated with conventional chemotherapy. The FDA in April 2011 approved the drug for sale in the US under the trade name Zytiga.

In 2026, staff took industrial strike action for the first time in the ICR's history. Unite the Union sought a 16% pay restoration, costed at £9 million, following six years of below inflation pay increases. After a 68 day strike, the dispute was resolved with an average pay increase of 17.2% and an increase of 52% for the lowest paid members of staff.

== See also ==
- Cancer in the United Kingdom
