= ONX-0801 =

Chemical compound

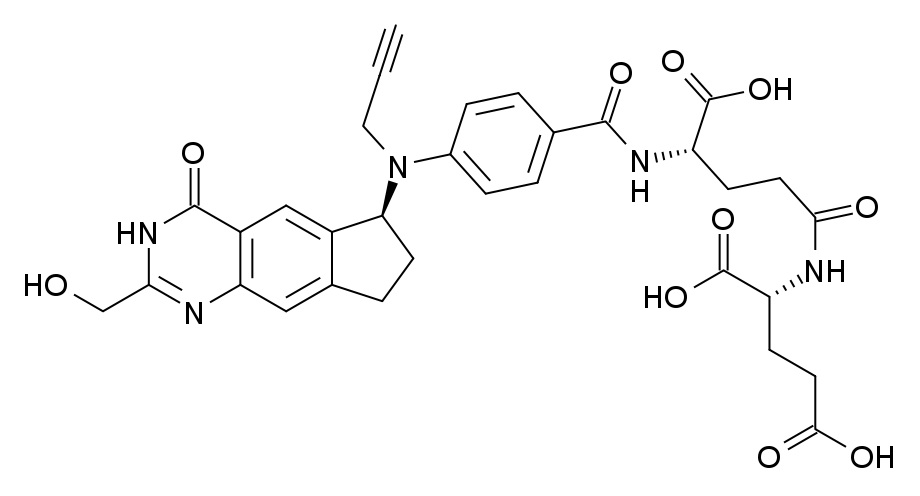

Clinical data
- ATC code: none

Identifiers
- IUPAC name: N-[4-[2-propyn-1-yl[(6S)-4,6,7,8-tetrahydro-2-(hydroxymethyl)-4-oxo-3H-cyclopenta[g]quinazolin-6-yl]amino]benzoyl]-l-γ-glutamyl-D-glutamic acid
- CAS Number: 501332-69-0 1097638-00-0 (trisodium salt)
- PubChem CID: 11671880
- UNII: Q718FS1C7X
- CompTox Dashboard (EPA): DTXSID701337116

Chemical and physical data
- Formula: C_{33}H_{31}N_{5}O_{10}
- Molar mass: 657.636 g·mol^{−1}
- 3D model (JSmol): Interactive image
- SMILES: C#CCN(c1ccc(C(=O)N[C@@H](CCC(=O)N[C@H](CCC(=O)O)C(=O)O)C(=O)O)cc1)[C@H]4CCc3cc2nc(CO)[nH]c(=O)c2cc34

ONX-0801 (BGC 945) is an experimental drug that has been developed to target ovarian cancer. It is a folate receptor alpha mediated thymidylate synthase inhibitor.

ONX-0801 was originally developed by BTG and the Institute of Cancer Research in the UK, and subsequently licensed to Onyx Pharmaceuticals for clinical development. It is designed to selectively target tumour tissues of certain kinds of cancer. It is poorly absorbed into most cells, but is actively transported by folate receptor alpha (FRα), which is usually only expressed at low levels in the apical membrane of some specialised tissues, but is expressed at much higher levels in some subtypes of ovarian cancer. This causes the drug to accumulate selectively in tumour tissues, while healthy tissues are only exposed to a much lower concentration.

In 2017, it received press coverage following the successful completion of a Phase I clinical trial.
