= OSI-7904 =

Chemical compound

Legal status
- Legal status: Investigational

Identifiers
- IUPAC name: (2S)-2-[6-[(3-Methyl-1-oxo-2H-benzo[f]quinazolin-9-yl)methylamino]-3-oxo-1H-isoindol-2-yl]pentanedioic acid
- CAS Number: 139987-54-5
- PubChem CID: 135403832
- UNII: ON177ZCE7M
- CompTox Dashboard (EPA): DTXSID70930683

Chemical and physical data
- Formula: C_{27}H_{24}N_{4}O_{6}
- Molar mass: 500.511 g·mol^{−1}
- 3D model (JSmol): Interactive image
- SMILES: CC1=NC2=C(C3=C(C=CC(=C3)CNC4=CC5=C(C=C4)C(=O)N(C5)[C@@H](CCC(=O)O)C(=O)O)C=C2)C(=O)N1

OSI-7904 is a noncompetitive liposomal thymidylate synthase inhibitor. OSI-7904 is a benzoquinazoline folate analog with antineoplastic activity. As a thymidylate synthase inhibitor, OSI-7904 noncompetitively binds to thymidylate synthase, resulting in inhibition of thymine nucleotide synthesis and DNA replication.

OSI-7904L is a liposome-encapsulated formulation of OSI-7904. Liposome encapsulation improves the efficacy and increases the half-life of OSI-7904.

Its effect on solid tumors is currently under evaluation.
