= Wimbledon College =

Location
- Edge Hill; Wimbledon; London, SW19 4NS; England; 51.4188°N 0.2215°W

Information
- Type: Voluntary aided school
- Motto: Cor numinis fons luminis (Latin)
- Religious affiliations: Roman Catholic: Archdiocese of Southwark; Society of Jesus
- Established: 18 January 1892; 134 years ago
- Local authority: Merton
- Department for Education URN: 102681 Tables
- Ofsted: Reports
- Chairman: Michael Murphy
- Headmaster: Adrian Laing
- Gender: Boys
- Age: 11 to 18
- Enrolment: 1255
- Colours: Maroon; Dark Green; Gold; Dark Blue
- Publication: The Wimbledonian
- Alumni: Old Wimbledonians (OW)
- Website: www.wimbledoncollege.org.uk

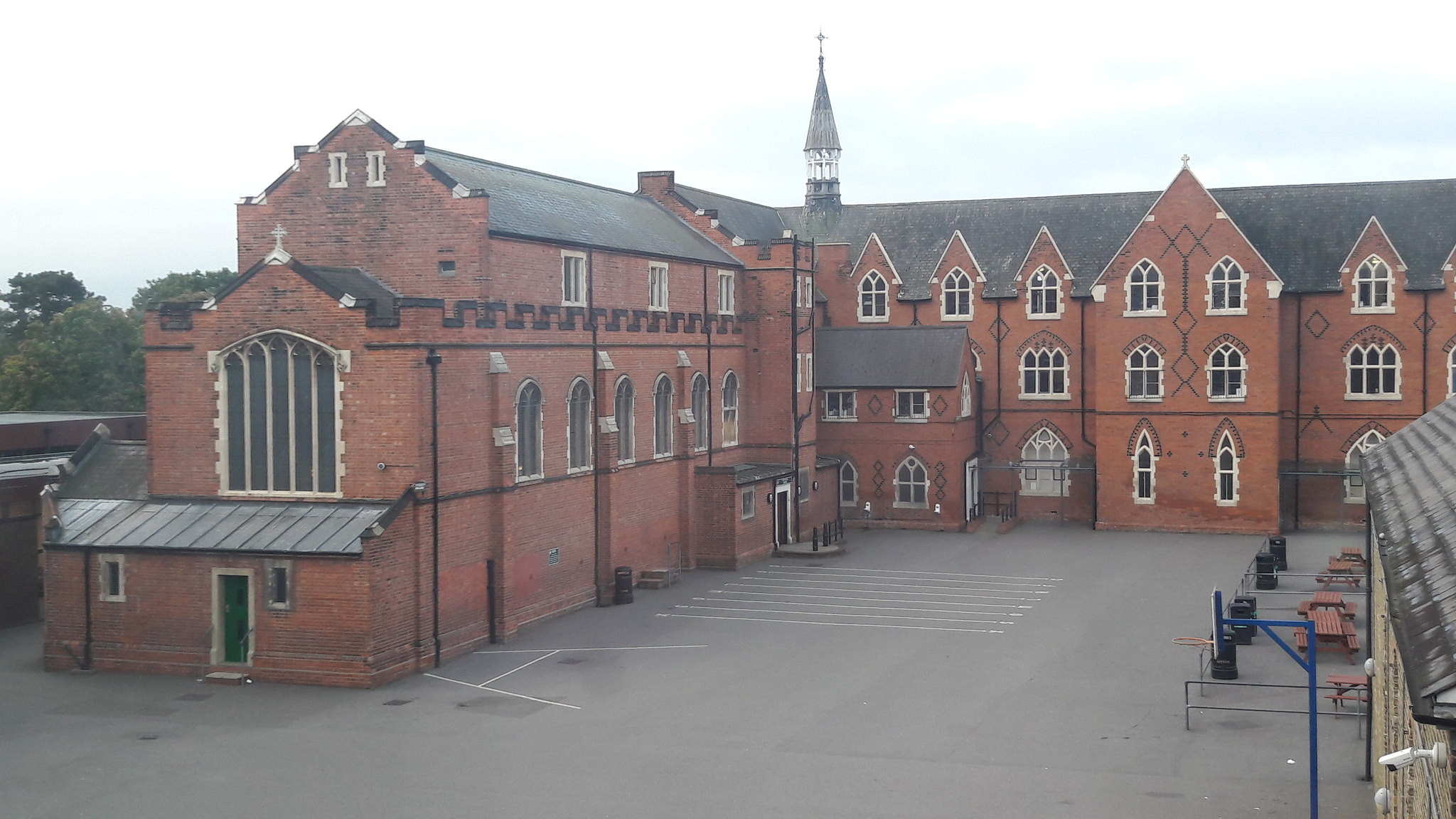
Playground and buildings

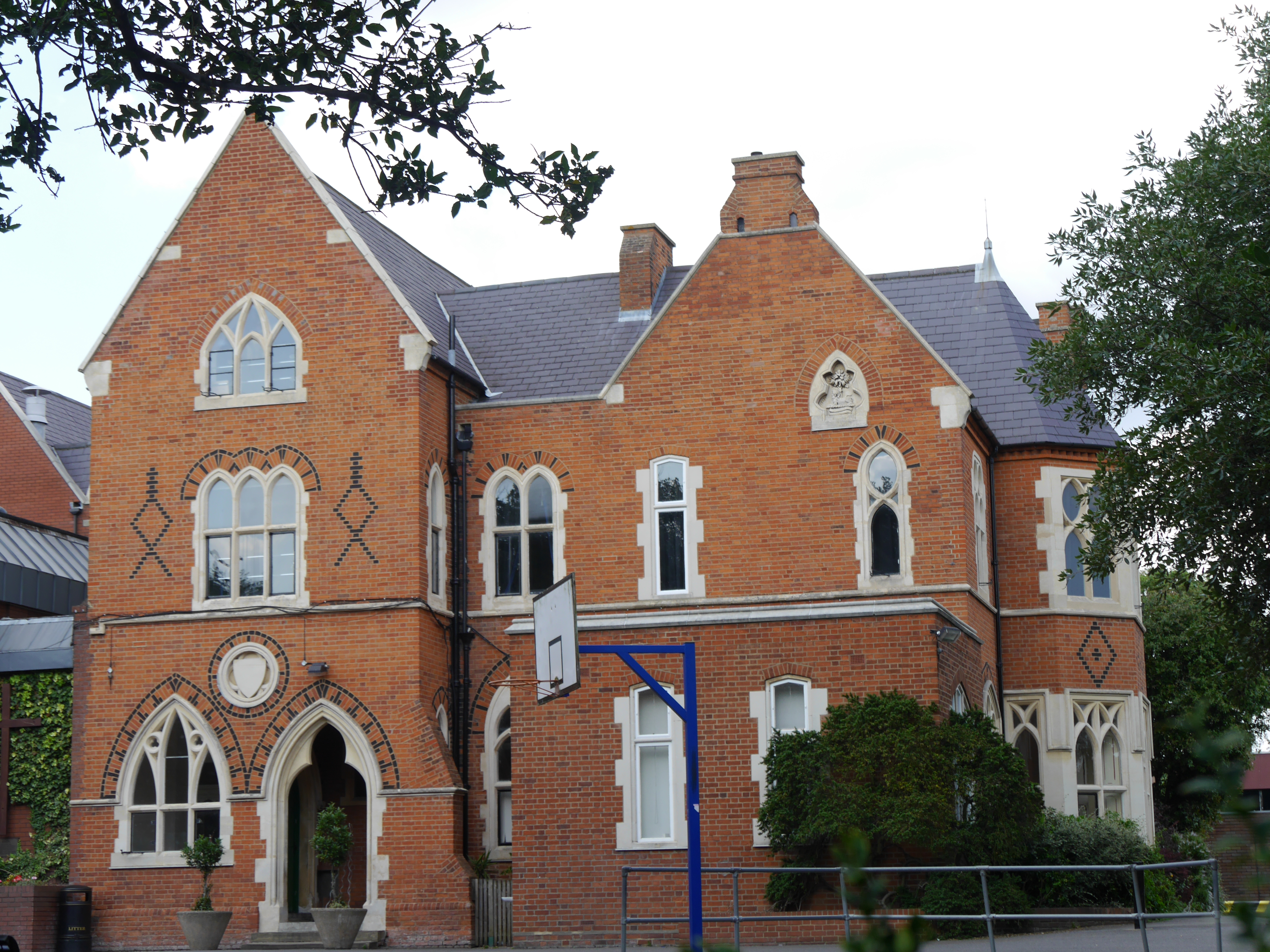
Brackenbury building, 2016

Wimbledon College is a government-maintained, voluntary-aided, Jesuit Catholic secondary school and sixth form for boys aged 11 to 19 in Wimbledon, London.

The college was founded in 1892 "for improvement in living and learning for the greater glory of God and the common good." It is affiliated with the Sacred Heart Church and Donhead Preparatory School, its former feeder preparatory school. It is also affiliated with the Ursuline High School, the college's sister school, who have worked in partnership since 1986.

== History ==
=== Early beginnings ===
The school was founded on 18 January 1892, initially at the site of No. 3 Cranbrook Road. On its first day, only one student, Thomas Lloyd, was in attendance; his brother William had fallen ill. After the first academic year, six more students joined the Lloyd brothers. During this period the school moved twice, first to a property on Darlaston Road and then to a building adjoining the All England Lawn Tennis Courts. Finally, in 1893. the college acquired the former site of Wimbledon School on Edge Hill, aided by the financial backing of Edith Arendrup. Lessons began at this site on 26 June 1893; the college has not moved since.

In September 1898, the Wimbledon College Army Department was established, which trained young men for entrance into the Royal Military Academies at Sandhurst and Woolwich.

During the First World War, the college lost 129 former pupils, including Maurice Dease and Gerald Robert O'Sullivan, both of whom received the Victoria Cross. On 18 February 1922, the war memorial at the rear of the chapel and the memorial stained glass window at the front, behind the altar, were unveiled.

In 1921, John Manning, the prefect of studies, which was then the formal title for Wimbledon College's head master, introduced the house system with three houses (Fisher, More, and Campion), leading to an expansion of extracurricular activities. This was complemented with the development of a senior prefect system, with six boys managing the day-to-day discipline of the school. In 1929, eight acres of field beside Coombe Lane, in Raynes Park, was bought as a venue for the college's sporting activities; it has been in use for these purposes ever since.

In 1933, due to the growing number of pupils, the decision was made to buy Donhead Lodge, across the road from the college on Edge Hill, and establish a preparatory school there. The seventy-two pupils from Lower Preparatory, Preparatory, and Elements were taken from the college and settled at the newly instituted Wimbledon College Preparatory School (now Donhead).

=== Under Sinnott ===
John Sinnott was inaugurated as the prefect of studies in 1937; he was the first former student of the college to hold that office. Sinnott is widely seen as having pioneered the college and wider Catholic education in Britain during his thirteen years as prefect of studies, over which time he developed a careers bureau, a college orchestra, academic interhouse competitions and violin playing. Acting on concerns of fire hazards due to crowded corridors and underfunded laboratories in a 1938 inspection, and on the appetite from inspectors for his plans to expand the provision of geography lessons, Sinnott made plans to expand the college with new facilities; however, he was frustrated by the outbreak of the World War II, when tight restrictions were placed on the use of steel and timber.

During the Second World War, the functioning of the college was much more disrupted than in World War I. The college and Donhead both had cellars which, with minor adjustments, were approved by local air raid wardens. Sandbags were brought in and timber frames used to reinforce the ceilings. Since both schools were outside the evacuation area, school was allowed to proceed. Three weeks after the outbreak of war on 3 September 1939, the new school term began, albeit with a drop in attendance of one in five pupils. Because the games pitch was distant from the bomb shelters, games lessons were cancelled during the war and break was shortened. The college's swimming pool provided valuable water for the local fire brigade and, in the local community, the school acted as a first aid centre.

On the night of 18 February 1944, a bomb exploded on the Convent of the Sisters of Mary, situated on the Downs, a nearby road, killing five nuns and wounding several others. Windows and doors in the college were damaged and the roof of its swimming pool caved in; the pool was never recommissioned at that site due to the damage incurred.

The college lost fifty-eight former pupils as a result of the Second World War, including Eugene Esmonde, a recipient of the Victoria Cross. They are commemorated by a memorial above the door of the college's chapel.

Separately, during this time, Sinnott had concluded that the independent school model was not suitable, owing to the unaffordable fees required of Catholic families; in January 1942, he applied to Surrey County Council (in whose jurisdiction Wimbledon resided at the time) for deficiency aided school status, and this was granted in 1943. This allowed the college to be funded by the local education authority while retaining its religious character. Fees were abolished in March 1945. This marked the beginning of the process of the college becoming a voluntary aided grammar school, which was completed in July 1948.

In 1945, Richard Milward, a former pupil at the school, began a 40-year tenure as a history teacher (and later as the history master) at the college. A popular teacher and local historian, and president of the Wimbledon Society for six years, he was seen as a stalwart of the school.

Sinnott died in his early 50s and was replaced as prefect of studies by Ignatius St Lawrence in 1950.

=== Post-1950 ===
The school expanded its facilities with a new wing (the St Lawrence wing) of classrooms, kitchens and toilets completed in the early 1950s; these are now predominantly used for English and science. The growth in demand for student places meant that the school quickly expanded, from nearly 500 pupils in 1950, to 670 by the mid-1960s. In order to accommodate all students, it began to use the parish halls of the next-door Sacred Heart Church, for lessons and study spaces, and facilities in Chessington owned by the Old Wimbledonians Association. Between 1965 and 1967, the school constructed a new cross-wing, the Manners wing, which housed the sixth form, new classrooms, a gymnasium and a swimming pool; the Manners wing now houses maths and sciences.

In 1968, the school successfully revived its houses tradition, which had fallen into irrelevance to many boys, and prefects resumed their function as the main guarantors of discipline. A dual house and line system, as operates today, was established. The following year, the college became a voluntary aided comprehensive school.

In the early morning of 13 February 1977, the college hall was destroyed by fire; the cause of the fire is still undetermined. The school's administration was not displeased, as a plan had been formulated for several years to build a new hall on the site of the old one; this plan was executed in 1980 in the aftermath of the fire. The new hall continued to house the college's kitchens and dinery.

During the 1980s, the school ehanced its reputation as a strong rugby and cricket school with a series of notable successes. Paddy O'D (Donhead Lodge Prep School) and Gerald Smythe (St Catherines Middle School) had built an incredibly strong sporting base which fed pupils into the Wimbledon College system. Notable players from this time were numerous and many went on to represent Surrey Schools as well as England Schools and a number went on to play first class rugby both in England and abroad (notably Brian Mullin of London Irish and Clermont, John Travers Rosslyn Park, Duncan Cormack London Irish, Esher RFC & Captain England Counties, Capt Fergus Timmons Rosslyn Park and Cambridge, James Dyson Richmond, Brian Gegg Harlequins and Cambridge and Ben Ryan Cambridge, West Hartlepool, coach of England sevens 2007-13, Fiji sevens 2013-16 winning Olympic gold in 2016. Other notable players of this era were Ivan Stroud (Surrey rugby, cricket and Rosslyn Park), Michael Nielsen (Rosslyn Park and Surrey), Steve Porter (Surrey and Harlequins) and Billy McCulloch (Surrey and Rosslyn Park) There was subsequently great success in the Surrey Rugby Championship. This also saw a golden period for the Old Wimbledonians rugby club with 5 teams turning out each week on a regular basis. The practice of using the ferula for punishment, as was common in Jesuit schools, was abandoned around 1989 in line with the government's banning of corporal punishment.

From the 1990s, the school replaced its forty-minute, eight-period day with a one-hour, five-period day and then its present fifty-minute, six-period day. Initially, lessons on Friday finished after the fourth period at the school in order to encourage extracurricular activities; this practice of early finishes on Fridays remains the standard at the Ursuline High School, but was removed from the college in the 2000s. In 1996, annual prizegiving assemblies returned, having ended in 1973.

Under Michael Holman, the school rapidly expanded its facilities. In May 2002, the school opened its new sports facilities, known as the Arrupe Hall, which include a large sports hall that also serves as the exam hall and a new swimming pool. At around the same time, the Milward Centre was open; it is the present-day sixth form centre. Both the Arrupe Hall and the Milward Centre were opened over the old gymnasium and swimming pool. In 2003, a new refectory opened over the site of former lavatories. The school acquired the grounds of the former St. Catherine's School on Grand Drive, in Morden, which was renamed the Campion Centre and taught Figures and Rudiments; the grounds on Edge Hill had become known as the Loyola Centre.

Under the headmastership of Adrian Porter, in July 2005, the school opened its George Malcolm Music School. Figures and Rudiments boys returned to the main site in 2005, with the Campion Centre abandoned. The period was marked with an expansion in extracurricular activities, especially drama, with the school's student magazine, The Wimbledonian, becoming a student-run publication for a brief period until 2010. The school was modernised with personal computers and new furniture and it briefly extended its joined sixth form with the Ursuline High School to Richard Challoner and Holy Cross in Malden Manor and New Malden respectively; this was ended due to the large distances involved.

In 2011, Adrian Laing became the first lay head master of Wimbledon College. As in 1968 under Robert Carty, attempts were made at reviving the house system, which had again fallen into irrelevance, with the creation of four new houses in 2011 so that the forms system could merge with the house system. Interhouse competitions and prefect-led house assemblies were restored. Discipline has been considerably emphasised since 2011, with increased security measures, electronic staff passes and registers, and policies targeted at improving attendance, punctuality, homework completion rates and the orderliness of pupils.

On 2 March 2020, the school was closed for at least a week for deep-cleaning after a member of staff contracted the COVID-19 virus on a trip to Italy.

== Organisation ==
The students of Wimbledon College are organised administratively into a dual line and house system. Over the history of the college, each of the two systems has varied in importance, with the house system often falling into disuse before being revived, as was the case in 1986 and 2011, whilst the line system was briefly abandoned in 1988.

In the provision of teaching, the college has been organised by departments since the 1980s, with shared departmental staff rooms and subject-specific blocs and classrooms. Certain departments cater for a range of subjects and courses, as is the case with the sciences, mathematics, humanities and arts departments.

In the achievement of pupils, the college is organised into a prefectorial system (which also has limited disciplinary powers) and a colours system.

=== Line system ===
In accordance with traditions in English Jesuit schools, Wimbledon College students are organised into a system of 'lines' rather than year groups. The lines are: Figures (year 7), Rudiments (year 8), Lower Grammar (year 9), Grammar (year 10), Syntax (year 11), Poetry (year 12) and Rhetoric (year 13). Each line has its own head of line responsible for the discipline and pastoral care of its pupils; and each line is subdivided into eight forms to which boys belong for administrative purposes and for morning registration and prayers.

Boys in Figures, Rudiments and Lower Grammar are grouped together in the 'Lower Line' whilst boys in Grammar and Syntax are placed into the 'Higher Line'. There is a Deputy Head Master for the Lower Line and a second Deputy Head Master for the Higher Line. The sixth form has its own separate head of sixth form and is largely excluded from the line system.

=== House system ===
Upon entering Wimbledon College, each pupil is assigned to one of the school's eight houses. Traditionally, families are able to request to be placed in the same houses. Each house is named after a saint. Every house has a head of house, which is a member of the teaching staff, and a house captain, which is a student and a member of the prefectorial team.

House	Abbr.	Founded	Colour	Saint
Fisher House	F	1921	Red	John Fisher
More House	M	1921	Blue	Thomas More
Campion House	C	1921	Green	Edmund Campion
Southwell House	S	1929	Yellow	Robert Southwell
Owen House	O	2011	Dark Green	Nicholas Owen
Hurtado House	H	2011	Orange	Alberto Hurtado
Loyola House	L	2011	Dark Blue	Ignatius of Loyola
Xavier House	X	2011	Purple	Francis Xavier

Since the creation of the four new houses in 2011, the house system and the line system have become partially merged through house-specific forms (for which purpose the new houses were created). Each form encompasses all the boys of a line in a specific house, leading to forms being named, for example, 'Grammar Southwell' and 'Poetry Campion'.

The school organises annual interhouse competitions, including in music, debating, spelling bees, subject quizzes, rugby, football, cricket and dodgeball. There is additionally a sports day at the end of each year for the four junior lines which is organised as an interhouse competition within each line at Wimbledon Park. For participation in these interhouse competitions and for good behaviour and positive contributions in school, students in the Lower and Higher Lines are awarded with house points which accumulate over the course of a year. Individual students can receive prizes after attaining a certain number of house points, including certificates of achievement, lunch passes to skip queues in the refectory; forms and houses which accumulate the most points over the course of a year are also rewarded collectively. The Sixth Form remains to be fully amalgamated into the house points system, with many of the interhouse competitions weakly attended by those in Poetry and Rhetoric.

=== Prefectorial system ===
Each year, a number of prefects are appointed by the head master on the recommendation of teachers and Poetry pupils. Prefects are selected when they are in Poetry and serve in office during their year in Rhetoric. Over the history of the college, prefects at times had a considerable and sometimes essential role in the day-to-day organisation and discipline management of the college; however, they now enjoy considerably less authority and prefects are now mostly called upon to represent the school at public events, such as at open days, and assisting teachers when required logistically, such as when escorting pupils to venues in public.

A number of prefects hold specific offices with additional responsibilities. These include house captains (who lead house assemblies), subject-specific prefects (such as the Chaplaincy prefect) who work closely with departments, the head boy, the deputy head boy and various sports prefects (who are also senior team captains).

=== Colours system ===
In order to recognise the achievement of its pupils in certain fields, such as music, sports and extracurricular activities, the college annually awards high-performing students honorary ties, known as 'colours'. Pupils are nominated for colours by the teaching staff and nominations are then assessed by the Gold Committee in order to ensure that consistent standards are met across the fields in which colours are awarded.

The lowest tier of the colours system, intermediate colours, is awarded to pupils in Grammar and Syntax. Half colours are then awarded to Syntax and Poetry students. The highest tier of the colours system, full colours, is awarded to Poetry and Rhetoric students.

== Sixth form ==
Wimbledon College has a sixth form catering for 296 pupils aged 16 to 19. As well as the provision of traditional A-levels and the Extended Project Qualification, the sixth form offers a number of vocational qualifications, including level 3 and level 2 BTECs and some GCSEs.

Since 1982, Wimbledon College and the Ursuline High School have worked in a consortium whereby pupils at either school can attend lessons at the other. Students at the Ursuline High School additionally have extensive non-reciprocal access to study resources at Wimbledon College, including its sixth form centre. The sixth form is served by its own pastoral support assistant; and its two-storey centre, formally known as the Milward Centre, includes a study hall, a common room, two offices and a smaller study room.

=== Traditions and activities ===
The sixth form encourages pupils to partake in the events of the wider school and in some opportunities specific to the sixth form.

The college has a longstanding tradition of societies often organised by sixth formers (including a debating society which was popularly attended for a large portion of the 20th century); however, no such formal societies have existed in recent years, with the exception of the Old Wimbledonians Association's Sinnott Society, to which current pupils are regularly invited in order to hear speakers who previously attended the college. The school's annual magazine, The Wimbledonian, was also formerly a "sixth-form satirical pamphlet" written largely by pupils; however, it is now professionally written mostly by staff with the assistance of student editorial assistants.

In the academic year 2016–17, opportunities offered specifically to boys at the sixth form included eucharistic ministry at the school's Masses, an annual homeless sleep-out in the grounds of the college in support of local homelessness charities, pilgrimages, topical panels, peer mentoring and subject-specific clubs.

Until recently, under the 'Project Manvi' scheme, Wimbledon College would invite sixth form pupils to visit a school in India with which it was partnered and had helped to establish.

== Academic results ==
At the most recent Ofsted inspection in 2013, the school was upgraded from satisfactory to good. The Education Commission of the Diocese of Southwark rates the school's effectiveness, pupil outcomes, management and leadership as outstanding for Catholic education; however, its provision of such education is rated as good.

Results at the college have been resurging after a slight fall in recent years. In 2013, 90% of pupils achieved 5 or more grades at A* to C and 29% achieved 5 or more grades at A* to A at GCSE level. These attainments were reduced to 72% and 20% respectively in 2015; the former rose back to 84% in 2017. At A-level, in 2012, 15% of grades were at A*, compared to 6% in 2016. The percentage of grades at A* to C grades fell from 82% in 2012 to 75% in 2017.

The school's performance has been consistently average or above-average on the Progress 8 score since it was introduced, having been 0.47 in 2017. The college ranked sixth out of nine state schools in Merton on that score in 2016 and 2017. On the Attainment 8 score, which measures progress in an array of specific subjects, the college ranked third in the local authority in 2016.

== Extracurricular activities ==
The college has a strong history in the provision of extracurricular activities, especially in sports, music and drama and chaplaincy. Each year, students are encouraged to take part in at least two extracurricular activities.

=== Sports ===
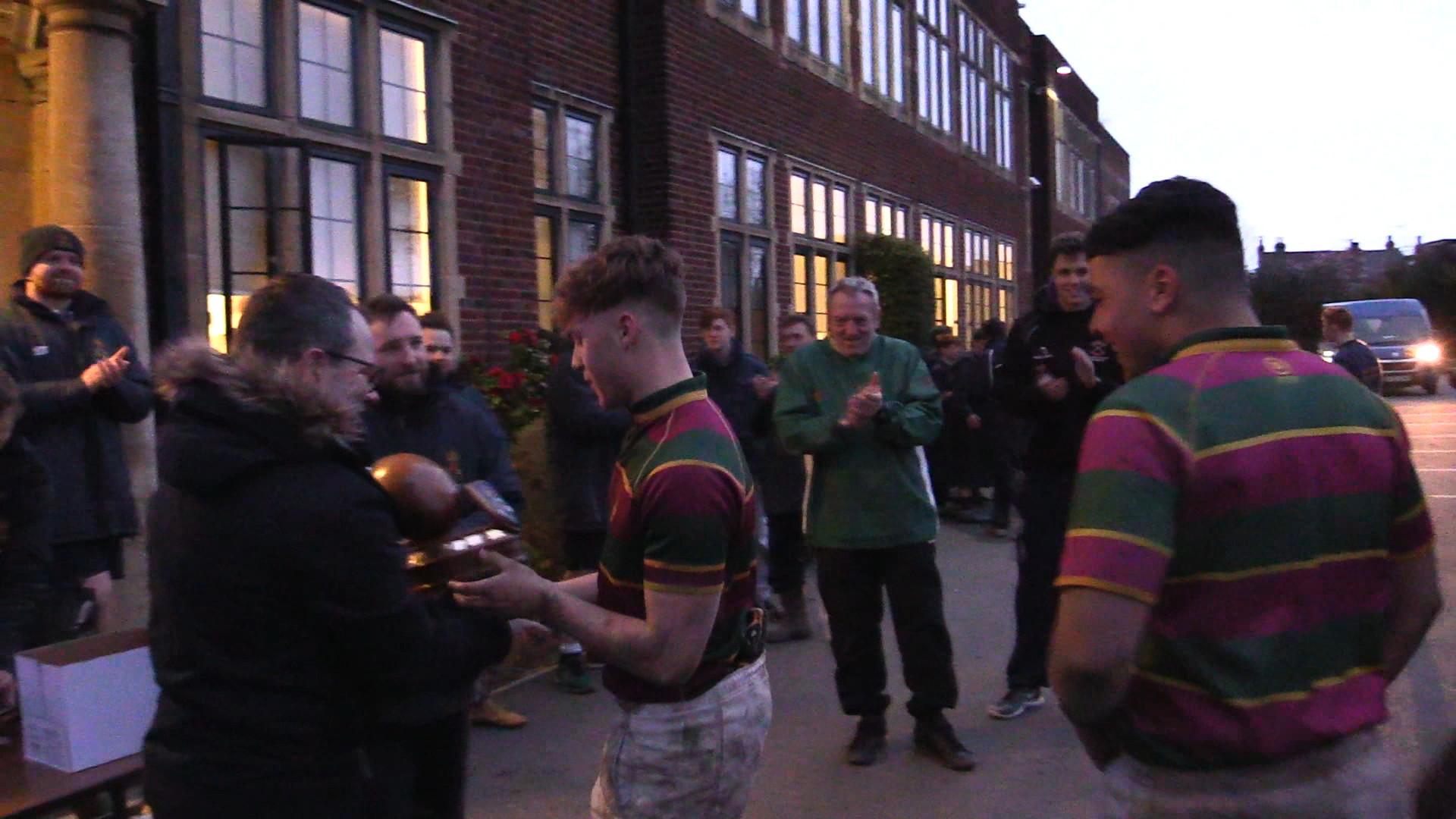
Winners of the under 16s Queen Elizabeth School Barnet Sevens in 2019

Wimbledon College has a selection of major and minor sports. Rugby is the biggest major sport, followed closely by football; the other major sports are athletics, cricket, swimming, basketball. The minor sports, offered regularly at the college, include cross-country running, skiing, golf, badminton, table tennis, tennis, boxing and fitness training. The distinction between major and minor sports is arbitrary and merely demonstrates the emphases put on sports outside of scheduled lessons. The school also offers fencing and other sports in addition to its major and minor sports.

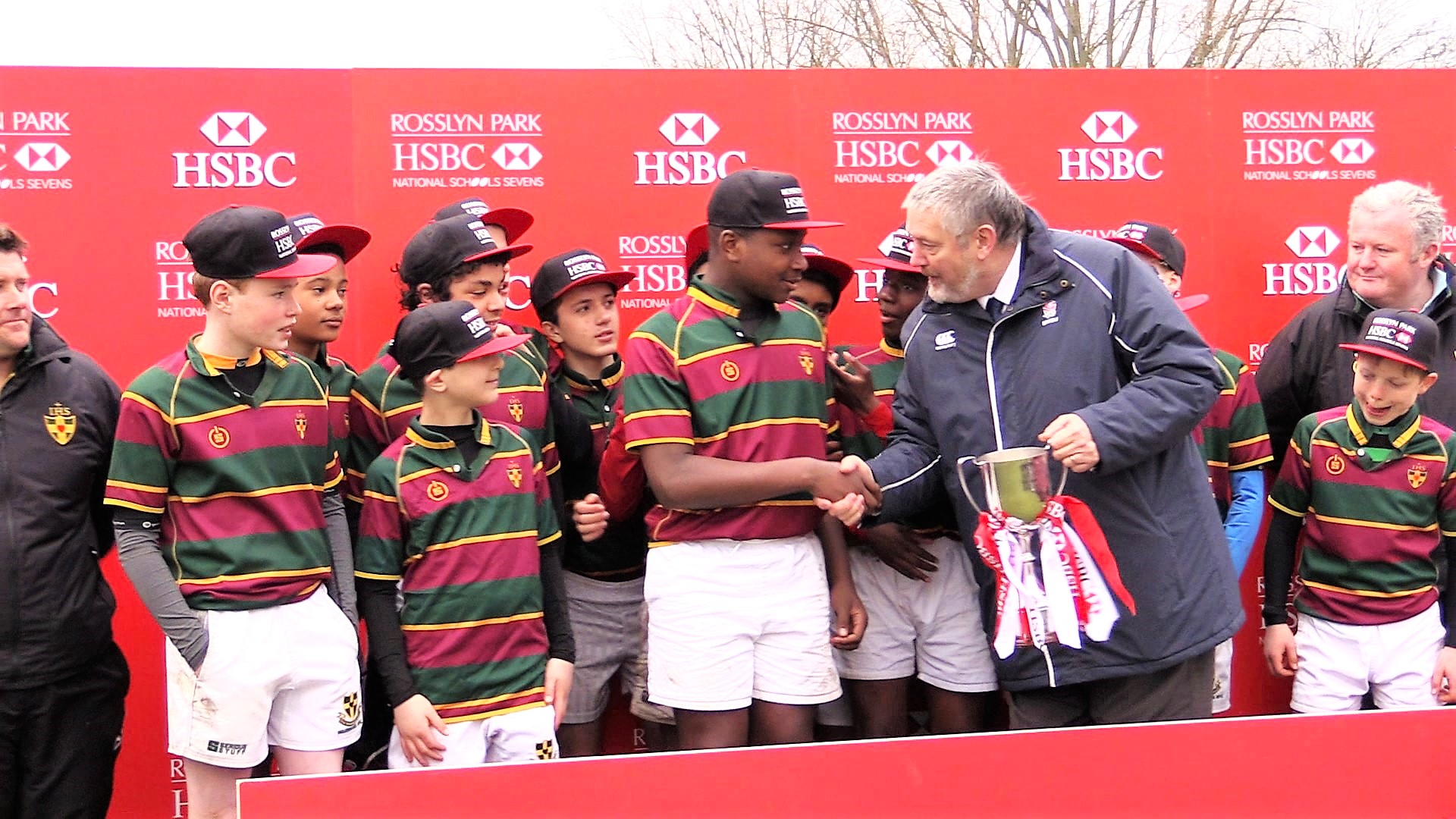
National Schools Sevens champions in 2016

In 2010, and again in 2016, the Wimbledon College U13 team won the Rosslyn Park National Schools Sevens Junior Trophy. On 24 March 2017, the Wimbledon College U14 rugby team won the same tournament's U14 Trophy.

On 4 May 2012, the U14A football team won The Collingwood Trophy.

In 2018, the college's 1st XI (football) came runners up in the London U18 Catholic Cup, losing 1–0 to St. Charles Catholic Sixth Form College in extra time.

In the summer term, rugby is no longer played, with cricket and athletics becoming the major sports. Athletics is practised at Wimbledon Park and cricket is played at the school's grounds in Coombe Lane. These all complement the school's annual interhouse sports day at Wimbledon Park.

=== Music and drama ===
The college is notable for its school productions, at least one of which has been produced every year since 1972, usually in partnership with the Ursuline High School. To assist in these productions, a revolving stage was built in the auditorium of the new hall and the school has a well-attended stage crew. Simon Potter MBE started the collaboration with the Ursuline, and produced, directed, adapted or wrote 67 plays and musicals between 1972 and 2022.

The college choir sings at school liturgies and concerts and organises annual trips abroad. The college also organises an array of orchestras and music bands, a Saturday music school, music lessons in partnership with Merton Music Foundation. The Strings Project, established in 2005, gives 50 boys in Figures the opportunity to learn the violin, viola, cello, or the double bass.

=== Chaplaincy ===
The college collectively celebrates Masses at regular occasions as part of its timetabled day, including on the feast days of its house saints and on Remembrance Sunday, as well as annual services such as the solemn Tenebrae service before Easter and a carol service before the end of the Christmas term. Such Masses are compulsory for most pupils. A separate evening carol service before Christmas is also organised in partnership with the Ursuline High School. Furthermore, the college has regular Masses on Monday lunchtimes and Tuesday mornings.

As a result of these Masses, the school organises various lay ministries, including reading and altar serving. The Guild of St. Stephen was started to recognise boys who had been regularly altar serving at Mass. Members of the Guild are eligible for a bronze medal which they may hang around their necks while serving in such Masses.

=== Other ===
The college is home to 136 Detachment, part of South West London Army Cadet Force, which wears the cap-badge of the Princess of Wales's Royal Regiment. The ACF offers young people the opportunity to take part in activities such as field-craft, navigation, skill-at-arms, first aid, shooting, drill, sports, and the Duke of Edinburgh's Award (Bronze, Silver, and Gold). The Duke of Edinburgh's Award is also offered separately by the school at bronze level.

The college takes part in the Jack Petchey Award, is affiliated with a local scouts group and has, alongside its wealth of other activities, a chess club and 3D printing club.

A student council meets annually. Its meetings are co-chaired by a senior prefect (usually the Head Boy) and its recommendations are taken to the school's Senior Leadership Team.

== Jesuit traditions ==
As a Jesuit school, the college uses St Ignatius Loyola SJ's Prayer for Generosity as its college prayer; this is recited regularly at school assemblies and functions. The school also has a strong focus on characters and virtues in the wider context of spiritual development, a fundamental aim of Jesuit education. In keeping with the traditions of Jesuit education, students are required to write 'AMDG' and 'LDS' at the start and end of each piece of work respectively; these are Latin abbreviations for Ad majorem Dei gloriam ("to the greater glory of God") and Laus Deo semper ("praise be to God always").

== Old Wimbledonians Association ==
The Old Wimbledonians Association is an alumnus network of former Wimbledon College and Donhead pupils. Officially established in 1923, it can trace its roots to 1905. It runs regular sports fixtures from its grounds at Coombe Lane (separate to those of the college), which also include a bar. Additionally, the Old Wimbledonians Association organises the Sinnott Society, a biannual group which meets to hear talks from other alumni alongside current Sixth Form pupils.

== Head masters ==
A list of prefects of studies (before 1944) and headmasters (after 1944) with the years they were in the role:

=== Prefects of studies ===
- Fr. James Nicholson SJ (1892–1893)
- Fr. Herbert Thurston SJ (1893–1894)
- Fr. William Crofton SJ (1894–1896)
- Fr. John Jaggar SJ (1896–1897)
- Fr. James O'Donohoe SJ (1897–1898)
- Fr. William Crofton SJ (1898–1899)
- Fr. George Jinks SJ (1899–1900)
- Fr. George Pye SJ (1900–1901)
- Fr. John Atkinson SJ (1901–1903)
- Fr. Henry Horn SJ (1903–1917)
- Fr. William Bodkin SJ (1917)
- Fr. Alfred Meyer SJ (1917–1918)
- Fr. John Manning SJ (1918–1923)
- Fr. Bryan Gavan Duffy SJ (1923–1926)
- Fr. Conyers D'Arcy SJ (1926–1936)
- Fr. Ignatius Scoles SJ (1936–1937)
- Fr. John Sinnott SJ (1937–1944)

=== Head masters ===
- Fr. John Sinnott SJ (1944–1950)
- Fr. Ignatius St Lawrence SJ (1950–1960)
- Fr. Richard Manners SJ (1960–1968)
- Fr. Robert Carty SJ (1968–1975)
- Fr. Peter Hackett SJ (1976–1980)
- Fr. Patrick Cooper SJ (1980)
- Fr. Francis Barnett SJ (1980–1985)
- Fr. Michael Smith SJ (1985–1995)
- Fr. Michael Holman SJ (1995–2004)
- Fr. Adrian Porter SJ (2004–2011)
- Adrian Laing (2011–present)

== Notable staff ==
- Herbert Thurston (prefect of studies, 1893–94), prolific scholar liturgical, literary, historical, and spiritual matters. Also a friend of George Tyrrell
- Michael Holman (Head Master, 1995–2004), Principal of Heythrop College, London
- Neil Hallett (rugby union)

== Notable alumni ==
=== Academics ===
- Donal Bradley, molecular electronic devices and applications – director of the centre for plastic electronics at Imperial College London
- Tom Connors, "father of anti-cancer drug development"
- Julian Elliott, principal of Collingwood College, Durham
- Sir Anthony Leggett, 2003 Nobel Prize in Physics winner
- Peter Milward, Shakespeare scholar and emeritus professor of English literature at Sophia University, Tokyo

=== Sports ===
- Louie Annesley, Gibraltarian football player
- Cassius Cleaves - Rugby player: Harlequins; England Under 20s
- Toby Gold, English wheelchair racer, classified as a T33 athlete
- Nathan Jibulu - Rugby player: Sale Sharks; England Under 20s
- Patrick Roberts, English footballer
- Ben Ryan, ex-England rugby sevens head coach, former Fiji sevens head coach
- Jay Tabb, British footballer
- Ike Ugbo, English footballer

=== Entertainment, media and the arts ===
- Christopher Hewett, actor
- Tom Holland, actor
- William Keegan, journalist and author
- Des Kelly, journalist and columnist
- Tom McGuinness, musician
- George Malcolm, musician
- Clement Marfo, musician
- Paul Merton, comedian, writer and TV presenter
- Philip Stephens, journalist
- Cy Curnin, musician
- Jeffrey Boakye, author and broadcaster

=== Military ===
- Maurice James Dease, was the first posthumous recipient of the Victoria Cross during WWI fought and died at the Battle of Mons
- Eugene Esmonde, World War II naval pilot, led attack on the Bismarck, posthumously awarded the Victoria Cross after the Channel Dash
- Sir John Keegan, British military historian
- Gerald Robert O'Sullivan, World War I Victoria Cross holder
- Sir Hubert Rance, last British governor of Burma and later governor of Trinidad and Tobago
- Patrick Reid, Colditz Castle escapee (WWII); author

=== Politics, public service and the law ===
- Sir Nicolas Bratza, British jurist
- Greg Clark, Harkness Fellow, global advisor to OECD, World Bank, Author
- Peter Duffy, barrister
- Lord Patten, politician and life peer
- Sir Michael Quinlan, British civil servant
- Richard Regan, Sheriff of the City of London (2006/07)

=== Religion ===
- Michael Holman, principal of Heythrop College
- Nicholas Hudson, auxiliary bishop of the Roman Catholic Archdiocese of Westminster

== See also ==
- List of Jesuit sites in the United Kingdom
- List of Jesuit schools
