= Nolatrexed =

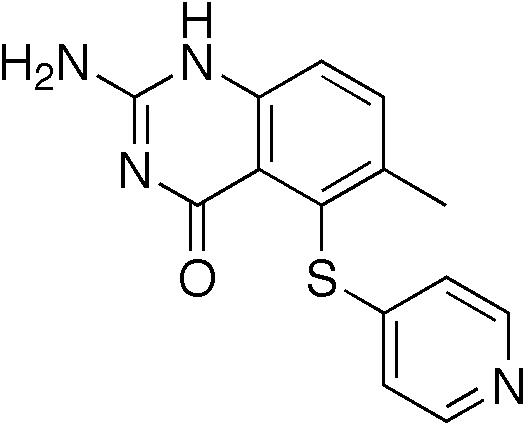

Names
- Preferred IUPAC name 2-Amino-6-methyl-5-[(pyridin-4-yl)sulfanyl]quinazolin-4(1H)-one

Identifiers
CAS Number	147149-76-6
3D model (JSmol)	Interactive image
ChemSpider	97268
PubChem CID	108189
UNII	K75ZUN743Q
CompTox Dashboard (EPA)	DTXSID3048281
- InChI: InChI=1S/C14H12N4OS/c1-8-2-3-10-11(13(19)18-14(15)17-10)12(8)20-9-4-6-16-7-5-9/h2-7H,1H3,(H3,15,17,18,19) Key: XHWRWCSCBDLOLM-UHFFFAOYSA-N; InChI=1/C14H12N4OS/c1-8-2-3-10-11(13(19)18-14(15)17-10)12(8)20-9-4-6-16-7-5-9/h2-7H,1H3,(H3,15,17,18,19) Key: XHWRWCSCBDLOLM-UHFFFAOYAK
- SMILES: CC1=C(C2=C(C=C1)NC(=NC2=O)N)SC3=CC=NC=C3

Properties
Chemical formula	C_{14}H_{12}N_{4}OS
Molar mass	284.34 g/mol
- Except where otherwise noted, data are given for materials in their standard state (at 25 °C [77 °F], 100 kPa). verify (what is ?) Infobox references

Nolatrexed is a thymidylate synthase inhibitor.
