= Alan Ashworth =

British molecular biologist

- Born: 1960 (age 65–66); Bolton, Lancashire, England, United Kingdom
- Education: Imperial College London (BSc); University College, London (PhD)
- Scientific career
- Workplaces: Institute of Cancer Research; Breakthrough Breast Cancer
- Thesis: Cloning and characterisation of cDNAs derived from cytochrome P-450 mRNAs (1984)
- Doctoral students: Elizabeth Iorns
- Website: cancer.ucsf.edu/people/profiles/ashworth_alan/

Alan Ashworth, FRS (born 1960 in Bolton, Lancashire) is a British molecular biologist, noted for his work on genes involved in cancer susceptibility. He is currently the President of the UCSF Helen Diller Family Comprehensive Cancer Center at the University of California, San Francisco, a multidisciplinary research and clinical care organisation that is one of the largest cancer centres in the Western United States. He was previously CEO of the Institute of Cancer Research (ICR) in London.

== Early life ==
Ashworth was educated at St Mary's Primary School and Thornleigh Salesian College, Bolton. He completed his Bachelor of Science in Chemistry and Biochemistry at Imperial College, London, and was awarded a PhD in biochemistry at University College, London.

== Career ==
Ashworth joined the Institute for Cancer Research (ICR) in London in 1986 as a Postdoctoral research Scientist in the Section of Cell and Molecular Biology and in 1999 he was appointed the first Director of the Breakthrough Breast Cancer Research Centre (BBCRC). The centre is now recognised internationally and has more than 120 scientists and researchers working on aspects of the disease ranging from basic molecular and cellular biology through to translational research and clinical trials. Ashworth's Directorship ended in January 2011 when he took up the position of Chief Executive of the ICR which he held until December 2014.

One of Ashworth's major contributions to cancer research has been his work on genes involved in cancer risk. He was a key part of the team that in 1995 discovered the BRCA2 gene, which is linked to an increased risk of some types of cancers/ which is now used to identify women at high risk of the disease. Ten years later, Ashworth identified a way to exploit genetic weaknesses in cancer cells including mutated BRCA 1 or BRCA2, leading to a new approach to work on Poly ADP ribose polymerase (PARP) as a drug target for cancer.

Ashworth's research and leadership reflects his passion for translating laboratory studies into improvements in patient care, particularly by the development of personalised cancer medicine.

In 2014, Ashworth stepped down as Director of the ICR to join the University of California, San Francisco as president of the UCSF Helen Diller Family Comprehensive Cancer Center (HDFCCC) and senior vice-president of Cancer Services of UCSF Health from January 2015. He also serves as Professor of Medicine, Division of Hematology/Oncology, Department of Medicine and holds the E. Dixon Heise Distinguished Professorship in Oncology.

In 2016, Ashworth and Pamela Munster, MD, established the UCSF Center for BRCA Research. In November 2016 he started the San Francisco Cancer Initiative (SF CAN). In 2017, he became inaugural chair of the University of California Cancer Consortium.

== Awards and recognition ==
- 1991 British Postgraduate Medical Federation Prize
- 1999 Elected to European Molecular Biology Organization.
- 2002 Elected Fellow of the Academy of Medical Sciences
- 2008 Fellow of the Royal Society.
- 2009 European Society for Medical Oncology Lifetime Achievement Award
- 2009 Elected Fellow of the European Academy of Cancer Sciences
- 2010 Samuel Waxman Cancer Research Foundation David Workman Memorial Award
- 2010 Meyenburg Foundation Cancer Research Award
- 2013 Basser Global Prize
- 2015 Spirit of Empowerment Award, Facing Our Risk of Cancer Empowered (FORCE)
- 2015 Genetics Society Medal
- 2016 Drexel Prize in Cancer Biology
- 2016 American Association for Cancer Research Board of Directors
- 2017 Komen Brinker Award for Scientific Distinction
