= Peter Duffy =

British barrister

- Born: 25 August 1954
- Died: 5 March 1999
- Citizenship: British
- Occupation: Barrister

Peter Duffy QC (25 August 1954 – 5 March 1999) was a British barrister. Educated at Wimbledon College, London, he read law at Gonville and Caius College, Cambridge, where he received a first class degree. He went on to Queen Mary College, London, where he taught from 1979 to 1989. He was called to the Bar by Lincoln's Inn in 1978. He took silk in 1997.

As a barrister Peter Duffy made a significant contribution to the advancement of human rights. He appeared in many of the most important human rights cases of the 1990s. Most notably he successfully appeared on behalf of Diane Blood in the Court of Appeal in her bid to try and conceive her dead husband's child.

He was a tireless advocate on behalf of gay rights. He persuaded the European Commission of Human Rights to condemn discrimination in the gay age of consent and he challenged the ban on gays and lesbians in the armed forces.

He later represented Amnesty International, the Medical Foundation for the Care of Victims of Torture and others in the Pinochet case before the House of Lords. From 1989 to 1991 he was chairman of Amnesty's international executive committee.

== Death ==
He died in London on 5 March 1999, aged 44.

== Legacy ==
The Peter Duffy Human Rights Award is awarded annually by Lincoln's Inn. It provides money for young barristers to spend three months under supervision at the European Court of Human Rights in Strasbourg.

Another award that bears his name is the Peter Duffy Scholarship, awarded annually by the Bar European Group, a Specialist Bar Association of the Bar Council of England and Wales, of which Duffy had been Chair at the time of his death in 1999.

Finally, The Human Rights Lawyer's Association annually awards the Peter Duffy Memorial Award. This award highlights the strongest applicant to their bursary scheme, which assists law students in undertaking internships and other unpaid work in the human rights field.
