= Gerald Robert O'Sullivan =

Recipient of the Victoria Cross

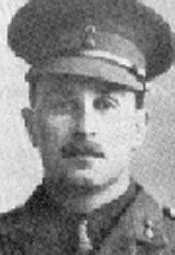
- Born: 8 November 1888; Frankfield, Douglas, County Cork
- Died: 21 August 1915 (aged 26); Scimitar Hill, Gallipoli, Ottoman Turkey
- Burial place: Remembered on the Helles Memorial
- Military career
- Allegiance: United Kingdom
- Branch: British Army
- Service years: 1909–1915
- Rank: Captain
- Units: 1st Battalion, The Royal Inniskilling Fusiliers
- Conflicts: First World War: Gallipoli campaign; Landing at Anzac Cove; Battle of Krithia; Battle of Scimitar Hill †
- Awards: Victoria Cross

Gerald Robert O'Sullivan VC (Irish: Gearóid Roibeard Ó Súilleabháin; 8 November 1888 – 21 August 1915) was an Irish recipient of the Victoria Cross, the highest and most prestigious award for gallantry in the face of the enemy that can be awarded to British and Commonwealth forces.

== Early life ==
Gerald Robert O'Sullivan was born in Frankfield, Douglas, County Cork on 8 November 1888. His father was a career soldier in the Argyll and Sutherland Highlanders. Known as 'Jerry', he was educated at Wimbledon College from which he graduated in 1906. He desired a career in the British Army and attended the Royal Military Academy at Sandhurst.

== Military career ==
Commissioned into the Royal Inniskilling Fusiliers in 1909, O'Sullivan spent much of the next three years serving in China with his unit, 2nd Battalion. From 1912, the battalion was based in British India but on the outbreak of the First World War was brought back to England.

=== First World War ===
The Royal Inniskilling Fusiliers formed part of 29th Division, intended for service in the Gallipoli Campaign. Now a captain in the 1st Battalion, he commanded a company during the landing at X Beach on the Gallipoli peninsula on 25 April 1915 and acquitted himself well during the early stages of the fighting. On 18 June 1915, the Turks mounted an attack on positions adjacent to those of O'Sullivan's company, forcing the troops manning the defenses to abandon it. He led his company in a counterattack to reclaim the lost position which exchanged hands several times during the next few hours. The commanding officer in the area, Brigadier General W. R. Marshall, eventually directed O'Sullivan to lead a party of Inniskilling and South Wales Borderers soldiers to capture the position which was achieved at dawn the following day.

Two weeks later, O'Sullivan was involved in a further action near Krithia, and this resulted in his recommendation for the Victoria Cross (VC). The citation, published in the London Gazette on 1 September 1915, read as follows:

For most conspicuous bravery during operations south-west of Krithia on the Gallipoli Peninsula. On the night of 1st–2nd July, 1915, when it was essential that a portion of a trench which had been lost should be regained, Captain O'Sullivan, although not belonging to the troops at this point volunteered to lead a party of bomb throwers to effect the recapture. He advanced in the open under a very heavy fire and in order to throw his bombs with greater effect, got up on the parapet, where he was completely exposed to the fire of the enemy occupying the trench. He was finally wounded, but not before his inspiring example had led his party to make further efforts, which resulted in the recapture of the trench. On the night of 18th–19th June, 1915, Captain O'Sullivan had saved a critical situation in the same locality by his personal gallantry and good leading.

The wounds he received in the action of 1–2 July necessitated his evacuation to Egypt for medical treatment but he quickly recovered and returned to his unit on 11 August 1915. The 29th Division was now at Suvla Bay and preparing for a new offensive. The Inniskillings were tasked with the capture of a feature known as Hill 70 or Scimitar Hill. During this battle, on 21 August 1915, he led a charge of 50 men to the hilltop but was killed.

O'Sullivan has no known grave and is remembered on the Helles Memorial to the Missing. His VC was delivered to his mother who lived in Dorchester, and his name also appears on the memorial there.
