= Donhead Preparatory School =

Donhead School
- Front of school

Location
- 33 Edge HIll; Merton, London, SW19 4NP; United Kingdom; 51.4180°N 0.2223°W

Information
- Type: Private, preparatory, day school
- Motto: Semper Magis (Latin) (Always More)
- Religious affiliation: Roman Catholic (Jesuit)
- Established: 1933; 93 years ago
- Headteacher: Ms Catherine Hitchcock
- Gender: all
- Age: 4 to 11
- Enrollment: 280
- Houses: 3 Xavier (Francis Xavier'); Loyola (Ignatius'); Campion (Edmund Campion)
- Colours: Royal blue and white
- Archdiocese: Southwark
- Website: Donhead.org.uk

Donhead is a co-ed private, preparatory day school located in Wimbledon, in the London Borough of Merton. The school is under the governance of the Jesuits, a Catholic religious order founded by Ignatius of Loyola in 1540. Donhead takes boys and girls aged 3 to 11.

== History ==
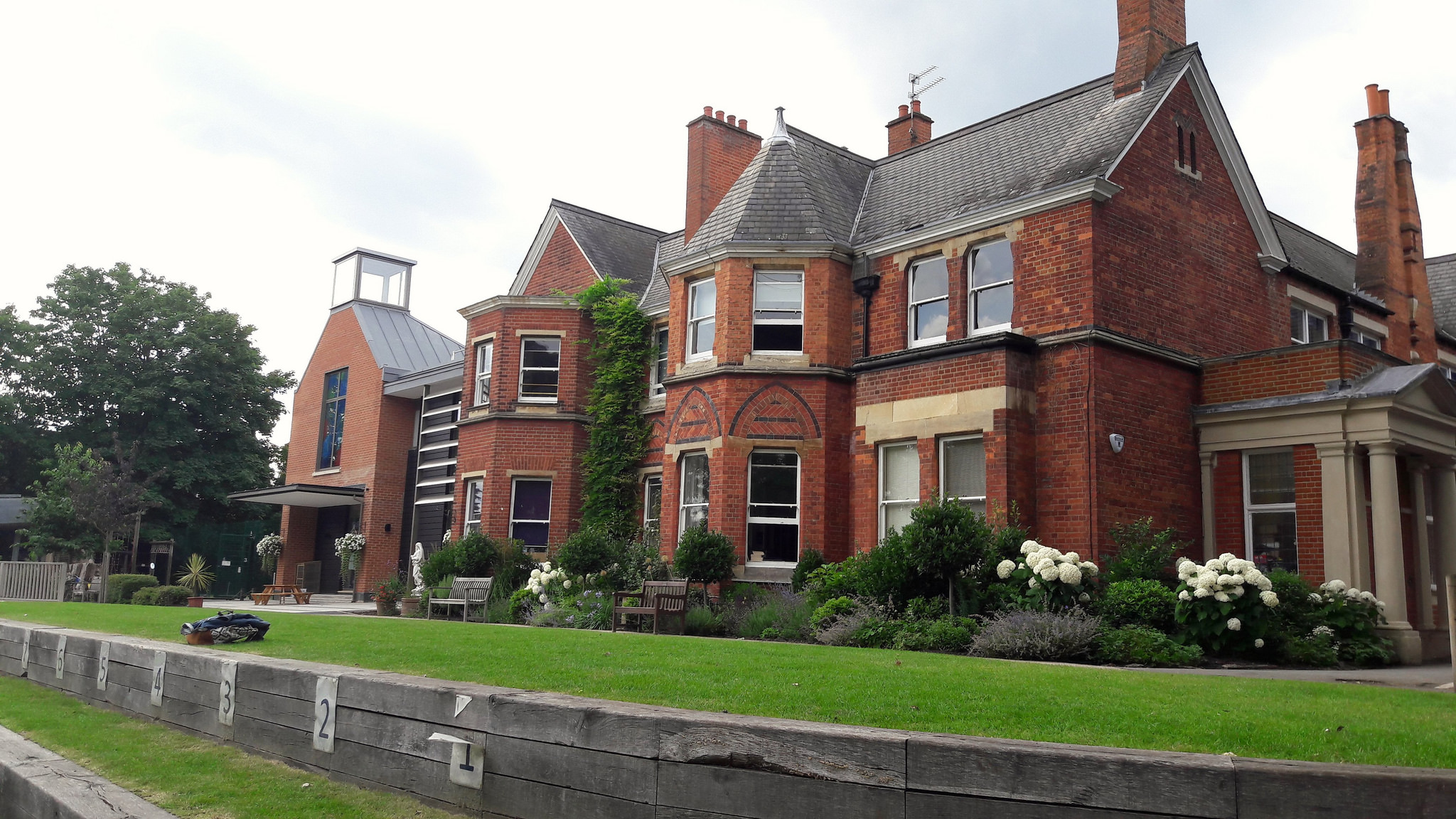
Side of school

The name Donhead perhaps originates from the Anglo-Saxon "head" meaning top and "don" meaning hill – "the top of the hill" and was first occupied by a barrister, a Mr Oliver Haynes. From 1880, it was owned by Mary Arnold. Until 1902, she used the building as a school for ladies. In 1932, the owner Henry Small left to the Jesuits after his wife died. The first headmaster was Fr Miller. Donhead's first pupils consisted of three classes named Elements, Preparatory, and Lower Preparatory, and numbered approximately 67 boys in total. The first day of the school was 5 September 1933.

From the late 1980s, Merton London Borough Council decided to close middle schools, resulting in the lowering of the age when students would go from Donhead to Wimbledon College from 13 years old to 11 years old. After this lowering of the top age group, like other schools in the borough, Donhead started admitting pupils at a lower age, so that they would still be at Donhead for the same amount of years.

=== Recent ===
In 2011, the school's Rugby Union Under 11A team were the National champions. They beat Blundell's in the final.

In September 2018, the school's ten-year £8m facilities development plan was completed. The school had a new chapel built that has capacity for 50 pupils, and uses the Donhead has more than doubled in size between 2006 and 2016.

== Traditions ==
The school runs over three terms: Michaelmas, Lent and Trinity. Following Jesuit teaching, students are expected to sign off with the Latin inscriptions AMDG (Ad maiorem Dei gloriam, which translates into English as For the greater glory of God) and LDS (Laus Deo Semper, which translates into English as Praise God Always) before and after finishing each piece of work they complete. Each year is known by a name, drawn from the Jesuit Ratio Studiorum, for the prep school: Year 3 (Lower Prep 1), Year 4 (Lower Prep 2), Year 5 (Prep) and Year 6 (Elements).

The 1st XV kit acquires an extra red hoop in addition to the blue and white resulting in a tri-colour jersey.

== Old Wimbledonians Association ==
The Old Wimbledonians Association (OWA) came into being in 1905 and was founded by old boys of its Alma Mater, Wimbledon College. Members of the OWA can be old boys of either Wimbledon College or Donhead Preparatory School.

== Notable alumni ==
- Peter Milward (1925–2017) – Jesuit scholar of literature
- Michael Quinlan (1930–2009) – senior civil servant
- Nicholas Hudson (b. 1959) – Auxiliary Bishop of the Roman Catholic Archdiocese of Westminster
- Danny Cipriani (b. 1987) – English rugby union player
- Tom Holland (b. 1996) – actor and dancer
- Donal Donat Conor Bradley, physicist
- Michael Kenny – political scientist

== Headmasters ==
- Fr Edmund Millar, SJ (1933–1939)
- Fr Francis Moran, SJ (1939–1942)
- Fr Edmund Basset, SJ (1942–1945)
- Fr Christopher Farwell, SJ (1945–1949)
- Fr Bernard Egan, SJ (1949–1971)
- Fr Philip Wetz, SJ (1971–1985)
- Mr Denis O'Leary (1985–1997)
- Mr Chris McGrath (1997–2017)
- Mr Philip Barr (2017–2023)
- Mrs Annie Thackray (2023)
- Ms Catherine Hitchcock (2023–present)

== See also ==
- Media related to Donhead Preparatory School at Wikimedia Commons
- List of Jesuit sites in the United Kingdom
- List of Jesuit schools
