= Science Exchange =

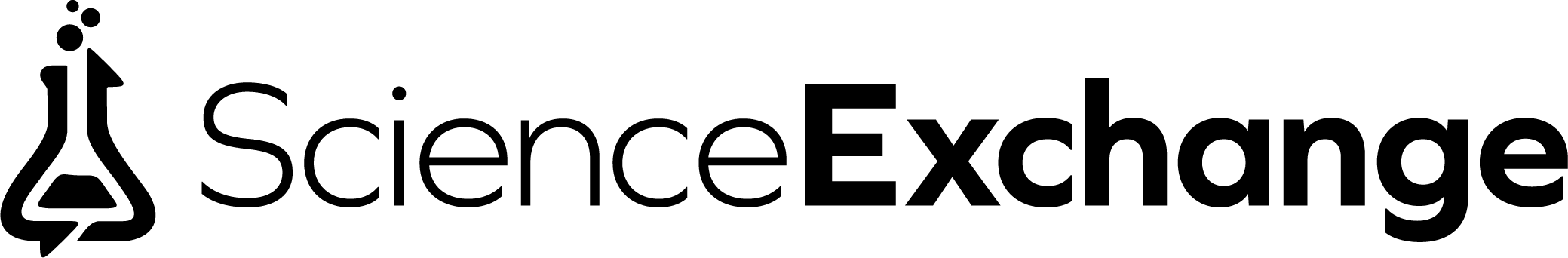
- Type: Private
- Industry: Software; SaaS; Biotechnology
- Founded: 2011
- Founders: Elizabeth Iorns, Dan Knox, Ryan Abbott
- Headquarters: Palo Alto, California, United States
- Key people: Elizabeth Iorns (co-Founder & CEO); Dan Knox (co-Founder & COO); Tzlil Hadass (CRO)
- Number of employees: 93 (Jun 2022)
- Website: scienceexchange.com

Science Exchange is a cloud-based software company offering an R&D marketplace to buy and sell scientific services. The marketplace gives life sciences companies access to the outsourced research they need and the platform fully automates R&D outsourcing from source to pay. Commercial contract research organizations (CROs) and academic core facilities can sell their products and services directly through the marketplace.

Science Exchange's enterprise clients include top pharma and emerging biotechnology companies, including Merck, Amgen, Gilead Sciences, Astellas Pharma, AbbVie, and Regeneron Pharmaceuticals.

Science Exchange was founded in 2011 by Elizabeth Iorns, Ryan Abbott, and Dan Knox, taking part in the startup accelerator program Y Combinator in the summer of 2011.

== History ==
In 2011, as an assistant professor at the University of Miami Miller School of Medicine, Iorns came up with the idea for Science Exchange after needing to conduct immunology experiments, but having difficulty finding potential collaborators or providers to work with. Iorns formed Science Exchange with Knox and Abbott, and the company applied for a place in the Y Combinator startup accelerator program. The company was accepted into the Summer 2011 batch of Y Combinator and launched the first version of its website in August 2011. In 2012 Iorns was recognized by the Kauffman Foundation for her role in starting Science Exchange.

== Business model ==
Science Exchange is a Software-as-a-Service (SaaS), with customers paying an annual subscription fee.

== Projects ==
=== Reproducibility initiative ===
In August 2012 Science Exchange partnered with the open-access scientific publisher Public Library of Science (PLOS) to launch the Reproducibility Initiative, a program developed to assist researchers in validating their findings by repeating their experiments through independent laboratories. The program is facilitated by the Science Exchange platform, which matches scientists with experimental service providers according to areas of expertise. Iorns has been a longtime spokesperson on the issue of reproducibility in academic research.

In 2013 Science Exchange partnered with the Center for Open Science to reproduce findings from widely cited published research in the field of cancer research. The goal of the study, called the Reproducibility Project: Cancer Biology (RP:CB), is to find common reasons explaining why aspects of experiments are hard to reproduce by independent laboratories. In January 2017, the first five replication studies of the Reproducibility Project: Cancer Biology (RP:CB) were published. Three more RP:CB replication studies were published in June 2017.

=== Independent validation program ===
On 30 July 2013 Science Exchange launched a program with reagent supplier antibodies-online.com, based in Aachen, Germany, to independently validate research antibodies.

== Investors ==
In June 2011, Science Exchange received a $100,000 investment from StartFunds' Yuri Milner, a $50,000 investment from angel investor Ron Conway, and a $20,000 investment from Y Combinator as part of participating in the startup accelerator program. In December 2011 the company announced it had closed a $1.5-million seed financing round led by Andreessen Horowitz. In May 2013 the company closed a $4-million Series A financing round led by Union Square Ventures, Tim O'Reilly's O'Reilly AlphaTech Ventures and several leading angel investors including Esther Dyson, Joshua Schachter, Lisa Gansky and Yuri Milner. In March 2016 the company announced it had closed a $25-million Series B financing round led by Lee Ainslie's Maverick Capital. In June 2017 Science Exchange raised $28-million in Series C funding, led by Norwest Venture Partners. In October 2019, the company announced it had raised an additional $20 million in financing, from a combination of equity and debt sources. Maverick Ventures and Norwest Venture Partners led the financing.
