= Greg Clark (urbanist) =

Author, global advisor, chairman and non-executive director

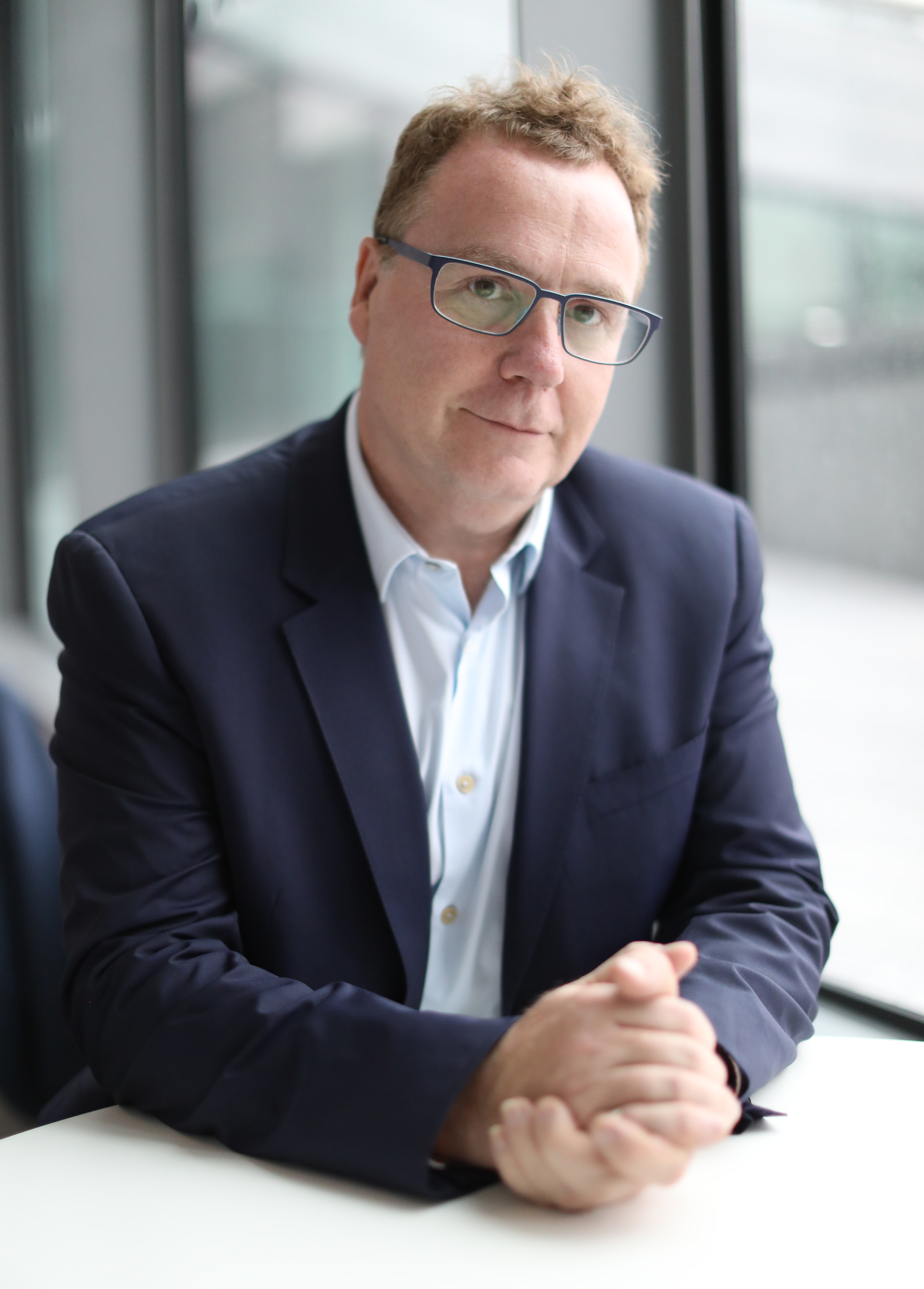
Greg Clark

Greg Clark, CBE, FAcSS is an urbanist, a writer, senior advisor, and Board Chair. Clark has advised more than 300 cities, 50 national governments and a wide array of bodies including the OECD, Brookings Institution, the World Bank and the Urban Land Institute (ULI) on strategies for city development and investment. He also advises global investors and corporate service companies on how to align with city leaders.

== Early life and education ==
Clark was born in Wimbledon, London in 1962 and was educated at the Jesuit Wimbledon College. Between 1980 and 1981, he spent time volunteering in Mexico City and New York, which was to ignite his interest in the world's biggest cities. He went on to Cambridge University, where he was JCR President. He joined the Local Economy Policy Unit (LEPU) (at London South Bank University) from 1988 to 1991 as a research fellow in London economic development. Between 1994 and 1996, Clark was selected as a Harkness Fellow based at Columbia University in New York City, where he read Globalisation and City and Regional Planning. From 1996 to 1998, he worked as a research scholar in city economic development at the London School of Economics.

He also holds some advisory roles including:

- Visiting professor, Cities and Innovation, Strathclyde University (Glasgow).
- WEF Global Future Council: Cities & Urbanisation.
- Bloomberg New Economy Forum, Cities Council.
- Urban expert BBC World Service ‘My Perfect City’ series.

== Career ==
Clark is author of 10 books and 100 reports on cities, investment and place-leadership. He is co-host of two podcasts, The Century of Cities and The DNA of Cities, and co-founder of the Urban Analytics Group, The Business of Cities. His column, The Planet of Cities, is hosted by RICS, and he is Global Cities expert on the BBC World Service Series, My Perfect City.

He has chaired more than 20 international advisory boards for individual cities that are reformulating their future investment strategies, long term plans, and governance, including Barcelona, New York, Mumbai, Sao Paulo, Bogota, Mexico City, Johannesburg, Cape Town, Sydney, Melbourne, Auckland, Barcelona, Vienna, Turin, and Oslo. He has led comparative studies on Chinese, Canadian, Australian, European, North American, Latin American, Middle Eastern, South-East Asian, Caribbean, Nordic, and Indian, Cities.

Globally, Clark’s previous roles include Group Advisor, Future Cities & New Industries at HSBC (2018 -2022), Chair of the OECD Forum of Cities & Regions (1996 – 2016), Global Fellow on Cities at the Brookings Institution (2008-2018) and Global Fellow at the Urban Land Institute (2006 – 2018). He was a Senior Advisor on urban investment at the World Bank, Inter-American Development Bank, and the European Investment Bank. Member of the WEF Future Council on Cities & Urbanisation, Bloomberg Coalition on Dynamic Cities, and Senior Advisor to The Bay Awards for urban innovation.

In the UK, he was Lead Advisor on Cities & Regions at the Office of the Deputy Prime Minister (2004 to 2010). He has worked extensively with Glasgow, Edinburgh, Cardiff, Belfast, Manchester, the Core Cities, and Scottish Cities Alliance. He was Senior Advisor to the Open Cities Programme (2006), and chair of British BIDs (2010). He is chair of the Connected Places Catapult, and 3Ci. He is Hon Prof at Strathclyde University and teaches regularly at LSE and UCL, and is Prof at UCL and City Universities. He is Fellow of the Academy of Social Sciences (FAcSS).

In London, he started work on refugee employment and as an inner-city officer at LB Lambeth in 1988 and held leadership roles at The Local Economy Policy Unit (LEPU), The London Docklands Development Corporation, Greater London Enterprise, London Enterprise Agency, and London Development Agency, until 2004. From 2012 onwards he has held non-executive roles including Chair the of London Stansted Cambridge Consortium (now The Innovation Corridor), board member of the London LEP for 10 years, and Transport for London (TfL) for 9 years (2025). At TfL he was Chair of the Investment and Programme Committee and founding Chair of the Land & Property Committee which oversaw the establishment of Places for London, TfL’s property company. He was a member of TfL’s Finance and Elizabeth Line Committees. He is Senior Advisor at NLA, authoring 14 essays for the New London Agenda.

== Recognition ==
- In October 2016, Clark was awarded a Fellowship of the Academy of Social Sciences
- In 2016, Clark was awarded the Freedom of the City of London
- In 2015, Clark was awarded CBE (Commander of the Order of the British Empire) by Queen Elizabeth II for services to city and regional economic development.
- In 2015, Clark was appointed Honorary Ambassador to the City of Brisbane.
- In 2014, Clark was appointed Honorary Professor at UCL, and invited to co-chair the advisory board of the City Leadership Initiative.
- In 2013, Clark was appointed visiting professor at Strathclyde University (Glasgow).
- In 2012, Clark appointed Global Fellow at the Brookings Institution.
- In 2010, The City of Barcelona awarded him the John Shield's Prize, an award given once a year to the international person outside Barcelona that has done most to promote the city.
- In 1995, Greg Clark was awarded a Harkness Fellowship by the Commonwealth Fund of New York, and was based at Columbia University in New York City as a visiting scholar.

== Publications ==
Books

- World Cities and Nations States, November 2016, Wiley
- Global Cities:A Short History, September 2016, Brookings Institution Press
- The Making of a World City: London 1991 to 2021 December 2014, Wiley
- Local Economic Leadership June 2015, OECD LEED (with Moir, E, Moonen, T and Mountford, D)
- Delivering Local Development: New Growth and Investment Strategies Local Economic and Employment Development (LEED), 2013, OECD Publishing. (with Moonen, T)
- Investment Strategies and Financial Tools for Local Development, 2007, Local Economic and Employment Development (LEED), OECD Publishing. (with Mountford, D) (eds.)
- Organising Local Economic Development: The Role of Development Agencies and Companies, 2010 Local Economic and Employment Development (LEED), OECD Publishing. (with Huxley, J and Mountford, D)
- Recession, Recovery, and Reinvestment: the Role of Local Economic Leadership in a Global Crisis, 2008, Local Economic and Employment Development (LEED), OECD Publishing.
- Local Development Benefits from Staging Global Events, 2008, Local Economic and Employment Development (LEED), OECD Publishing.
- Investment Strategies and Financial Tools for Local Development, 2007, Local Economic and Employment Development (LEED), OECD Publishing. (with Moir, E and Gledhill, L)

== Personal life ==
Clark is married to Julia Franks since 1997. They have two sons and live in London.
