= Thymidylate synthase inhibitor =

Chemical agent

Thymidylate synthase inhibitors are chemical agents which inhibit the enzyme thymidylate synthase and have potential as an anticancer chemotherapy. This inhibition prevents the methylation of C5 of deoxyuridine monophosphate (dUMP) thereby inhibiting the synthesis of deoxythymidine monophosphate (dTMP). The downstream effect is promotion of cell death because cells would not be able to properly undergo DNA synthesis if they are lacking dTMP, a necessary precursor to dTTP. Five agents were in clinical trials in 2002: raltitrexed, pemetrexed, nolatrexed, Plevitrexed( ZD9331/BGC9331), and GS7904L.

Examples include

- Raltitrexed, used for colorectal cancer since 1998
- Fluorouracil, used for colorectal cancer
- BGC 945/ ONX-0801
- OSI-7904L
- CB300638
