= Tom Connors (research scientist) =

- Born: Thomas Anthony Connors; 18 December 1934
- Died: 4 February 2002 (aged 67)
- Education: Wimbledon College

Professor Thomas Anthony Connors (18 December 1934 – 4 February 2002) was a British cancer research scientist.

== Career ==
Connors was for 40 years involved in the development of anti-cancer drugs including cis-platinum and its derivative, carboplatin, two effective anti-cancer agents. Connors' initial research was under the auspices of mentor and friend Professor Walter Ross at the Chester Beatty Institute where he gained his Doctorate in 1960. In 1976 Connors' career expanded into the field of toxicology and he was appointed Director of the Medical Research Council's toxicology unit. Connors also sat on committees including the Cancer Research Campaign. He formed the Phase I/II Drug Development Committee during this period. Connors also advised overseas institutes and their governments. and was a special advisor to President Gerald Ford. On retirement in 1994 Connors was appointed Honorary Professor at the School of Pharmacy, University of London. Connors was awarded many honours including honorary degrees from several universities, including Aston (1997) and Dublin Trinity in 2001. He has a research unit named after him at Bradford University.

Connors was an alumnus of Wimbledon College, to which he won a scholarship to study in the 1940s/50's. As well as proving to be an adept academic, he represented the school at rugby where he played wing three-quarter and went on to play many times for the Old Wimbledonians rugby club. He also represented the school and London schools at athletics, being at the time one of the fastest boys over 100 yards in the country. Tom was also an active member of the Old Wimbledonians Association.
