= The Guardian Angels Church, Mile End =

Church in Bow, London

Coordinates: 51.52483°N 0.03617°W

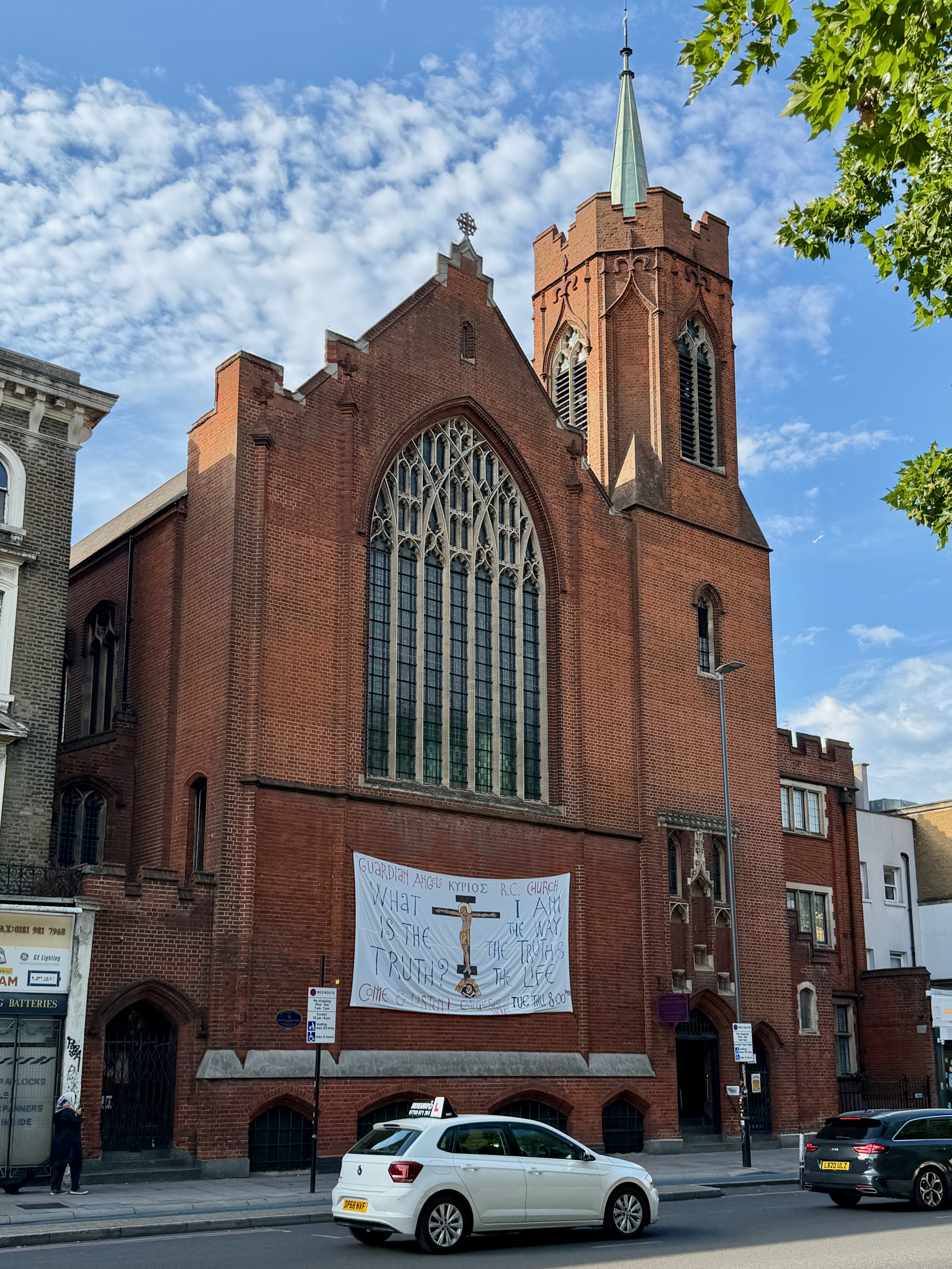
Church of the Guardian Angels

The Guardian Angels Church is a Roman Catholic church at 377 Mile End Road in Mile End, East London. Designed by Frederick Arthur Walters, it was opened in 1903 and paid for by Henry Fitzalan-Howard, 15th Duke of Norfolk as a memorial to his youngest sister, Lady Margaret Howard, who had performed charitable work in the East End.

The church and its presbytery are both grade II listed buildings.
