= Church of the Holy Name and Our Lady of the Sacred Heart, Bow =

Roman Catholic church in East London, England

Coordinates: 51.51824°N 0.02343°W

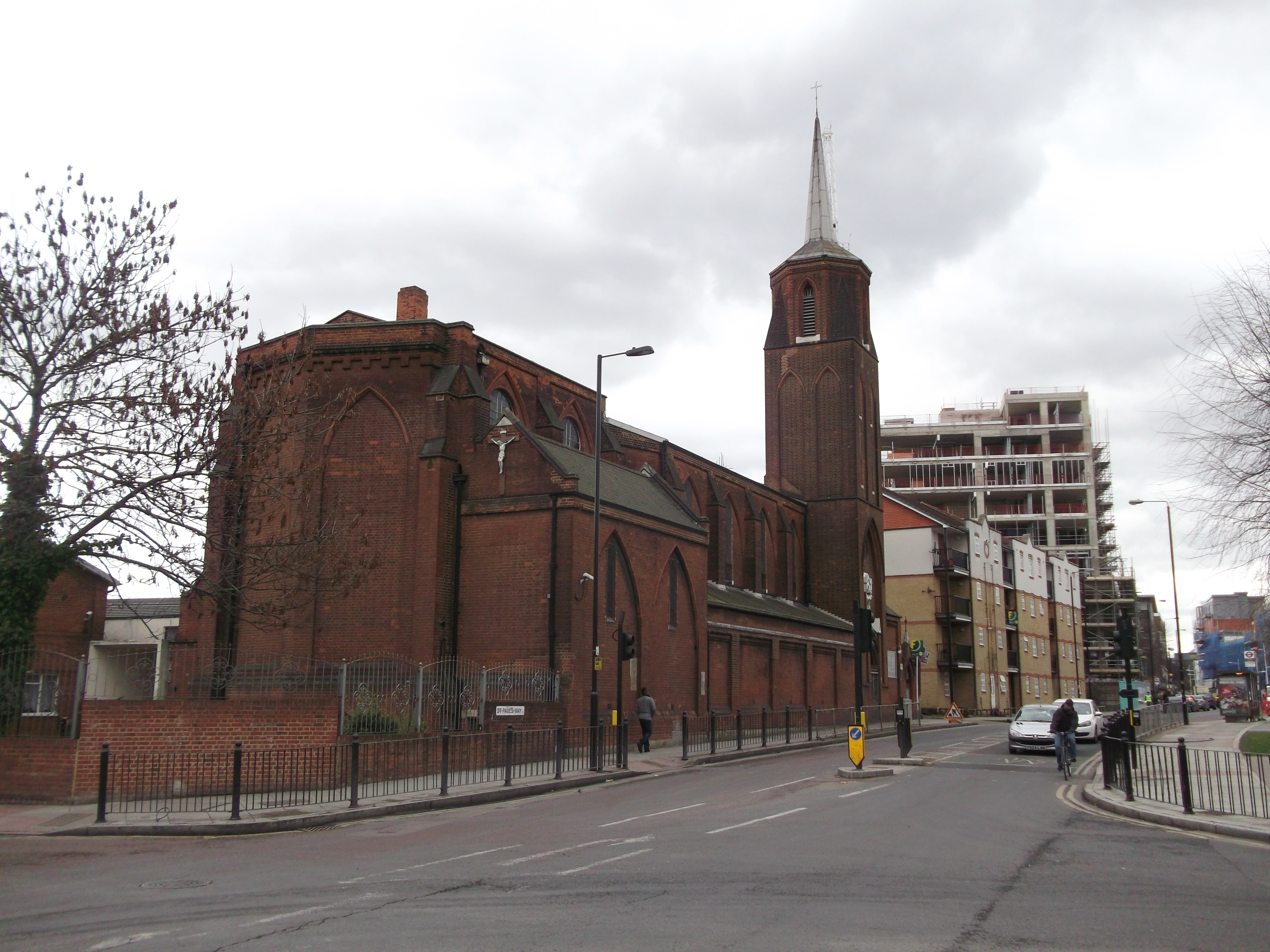
Vietnamese Catholic Church, Bow

The Church of the Holy Name and Our Lady of the Sacred Heart is a Roman Catholic church at 117 Bow Common Lane, E3 in Bow Common, East London. It is dedicated to the Holy Name of Jesus and Our Lady of the Sacred Heart and designed by Frederick Arthur Walters.

It opened in 1894 and is now home to the Vietnamese chaplaincy in the Archdiocese of Westminster.
