= St Anne's Church, Vauxhall =

St Anne's Church Vauxhall
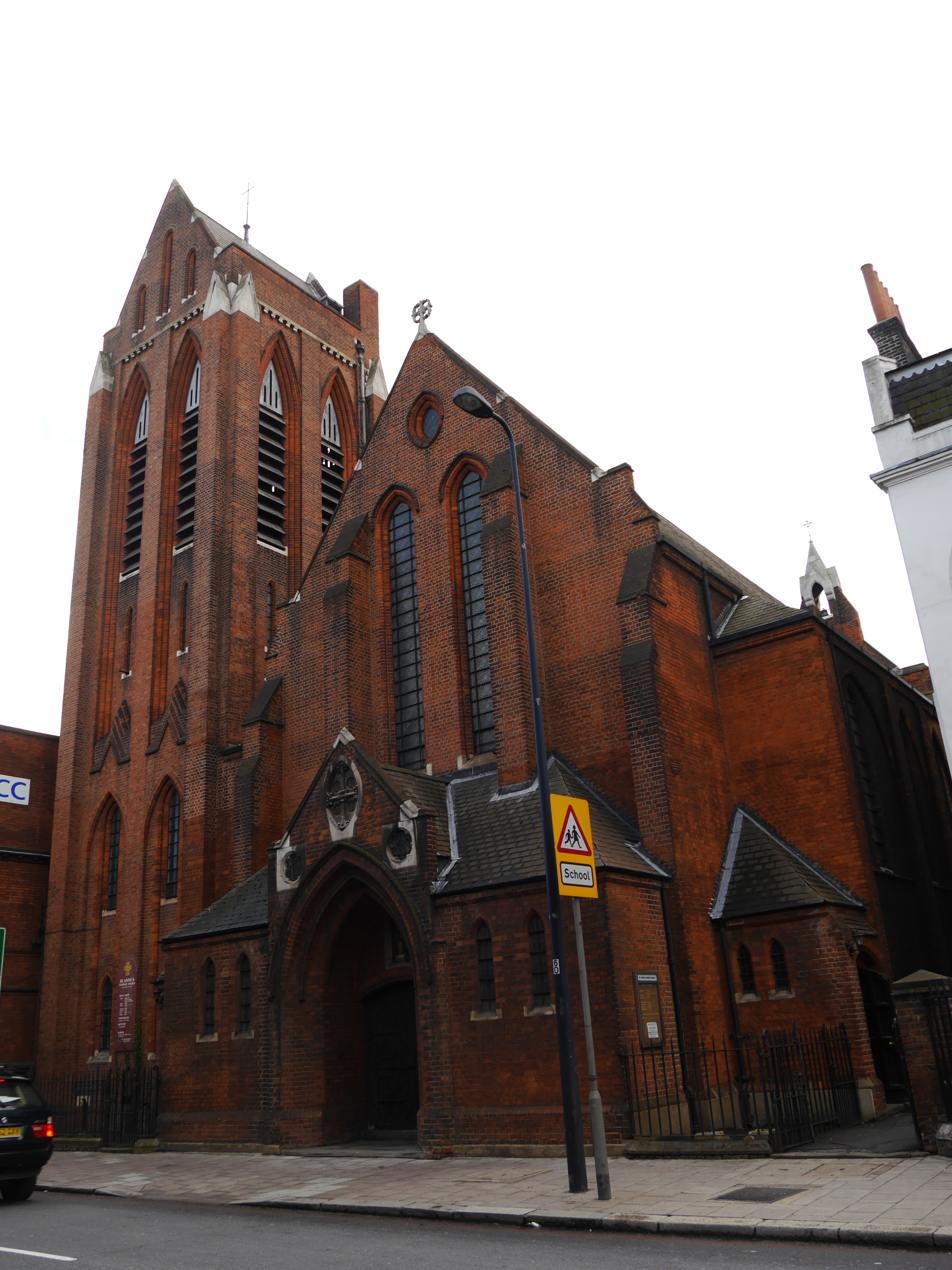
- The front view of the church

- Location within Greater London Location within England
- 51.486059°N 0.119885°W
- OS grid reference: TQ 30638 78020
- Location: Vauxhall, London
- Address: Kennington Lane, SE11
- Country: England
- Denomination: Catholic Church
- Website: www.stannescatholicchurchvauxhall.co.uk

History
- Dedication: St Anne

Architecture
- Functional status: Active
- Heritage designation: Grade II
- Designated: 27 March 1981
- Architect: Frederick Walters
- Years built: 1903–1907

Administration
- Province: Ecclesiastical province of Southwark
- Archdiocese: Archdiocese of Southwark
- Deanery: Cathedral
- Parish: Vauxhall

Clergy
- Priest: Fr. Douglas Beard OAR

St Anne's Church is a Roman Catholic church at 363 Kennington Lane, Vauxhall, London SE11.

It was built in about 1903–07, designed by Frederick Walters, and has been Grade II listed since 1981. Its presbytery is the St Anne's House next door.
