= John Carter (architect) =

English draughtsman and architect (1748–1817)

John Carter (1748–1817) was an English draughtsman and architect, who was an early advocate of the revival of Gothic architecture.

== Life ==
Carter was born on 22 June 1748, the son of Benjamin Carter (d.1766), a marble-carver established in Piccadilly in the West End of London; his father's brother Thomas (d.1795) was also in business as a sculptor of marble. At an early age he was sent to a boarding-school at Battersea, and then to one in Kennington Lane. Leaving school aged about twelve, he went home to his father, making working drawings for the men. In about 1764, following his father's death, Carter was taken into the office of a Joseph Dixon, a surveyor and mason, with whom he remained for some years.

In 1774 he was employed to execute drawings of St. Paul's Churchyard for the Builders Magazine, edited by Francis Newbery, for which he was to continue to draw until 1786. Between 1775 and 1778 he published almost 30 designs for Gothic buildings in the magazine. He insisted that the Gothic was the correct style for ecclesiastical structures, Classical modes being only suitable for "mansions and other structures of ease and pleasure".

In 1780, on the recommendation of Michael Lort, Carter was employed by the Society of Antiquaries to do some drawing and etching. He was elected a fellow of the society in March 1795, and then worked as its draughtsman. In 1780 he had drawn for Richard Gough, later a patron, the west front of Croyland Abbey Church and other subjects, in Gough's Sepulchral Monuments and other works. From 1781 Carter also met other patrons and friends, among whom were John Soane, John Milner, Sir Henry Charles Englefield, William Bray, Sir Richard Colt Hoare, the Earl of Exeter, and Horace Walpole.

== Carter's drawings of Lea Castle ==
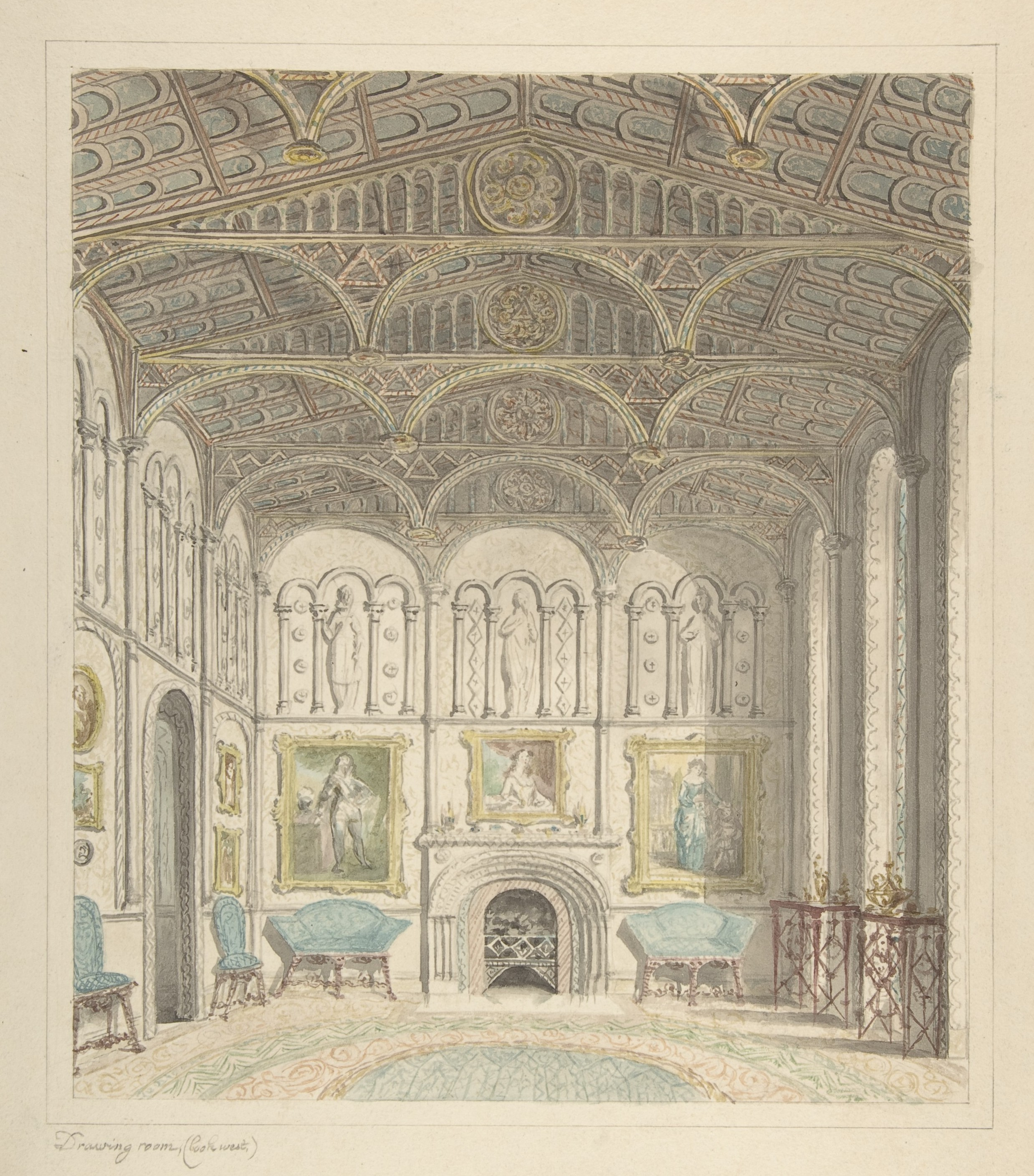

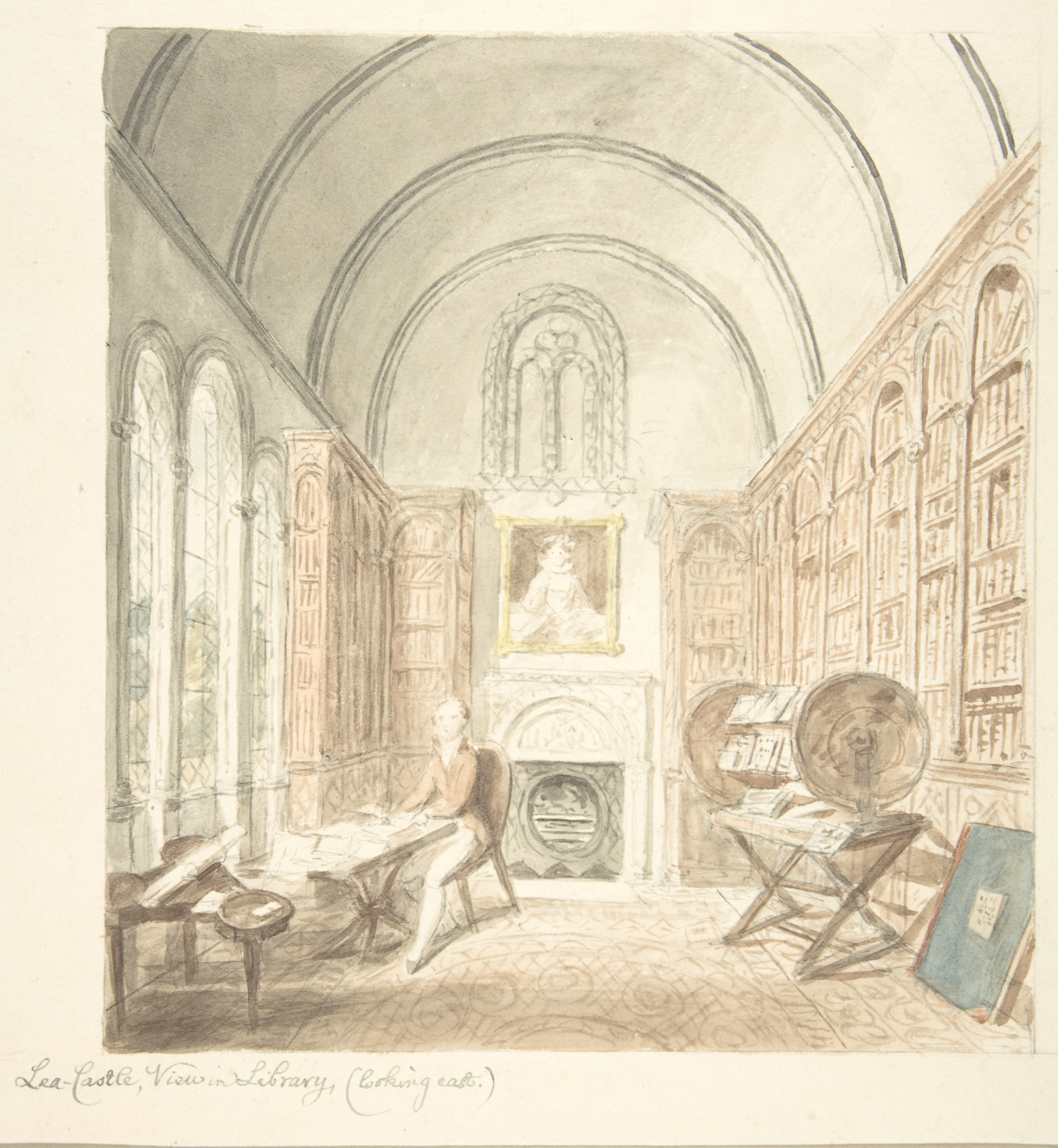

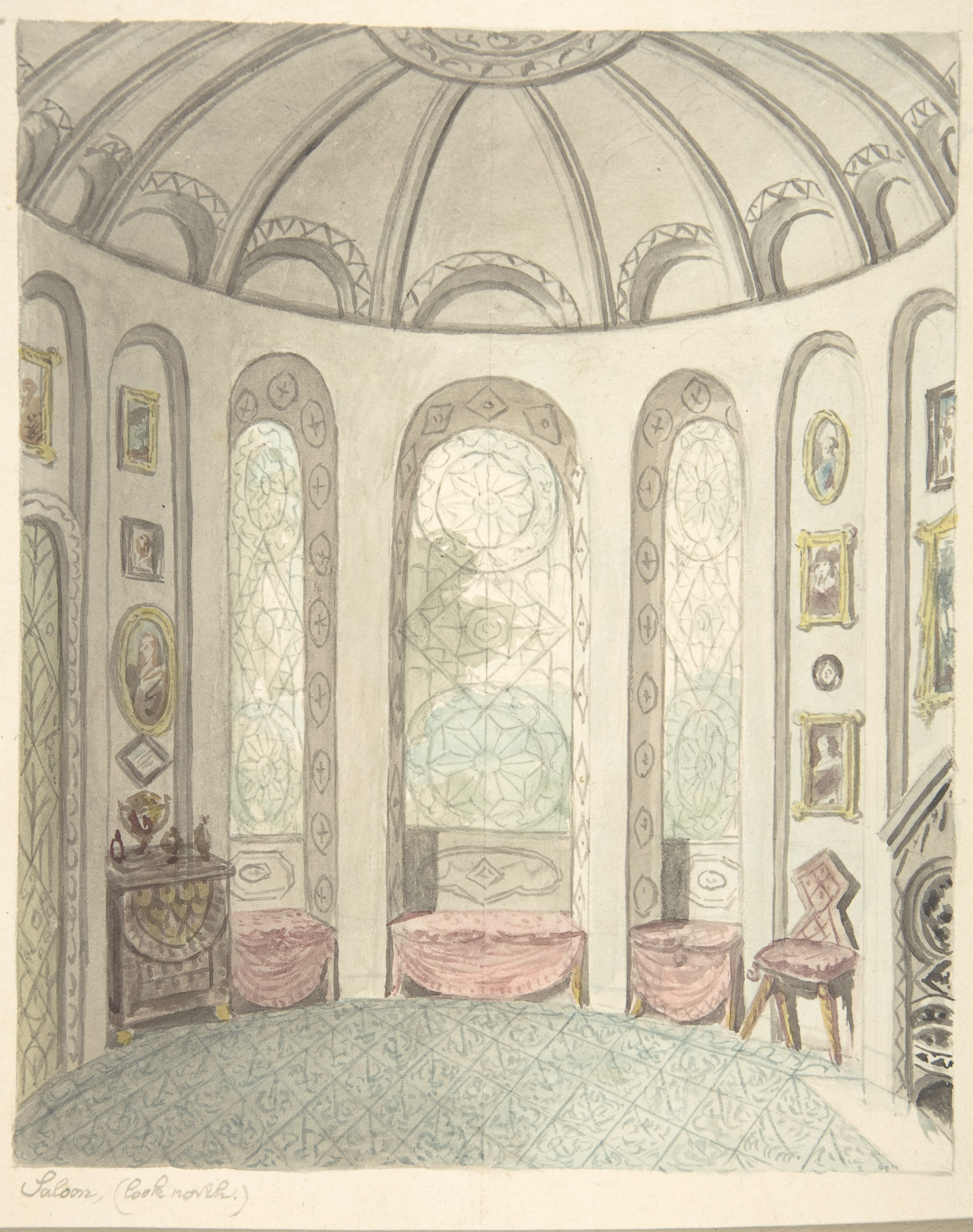

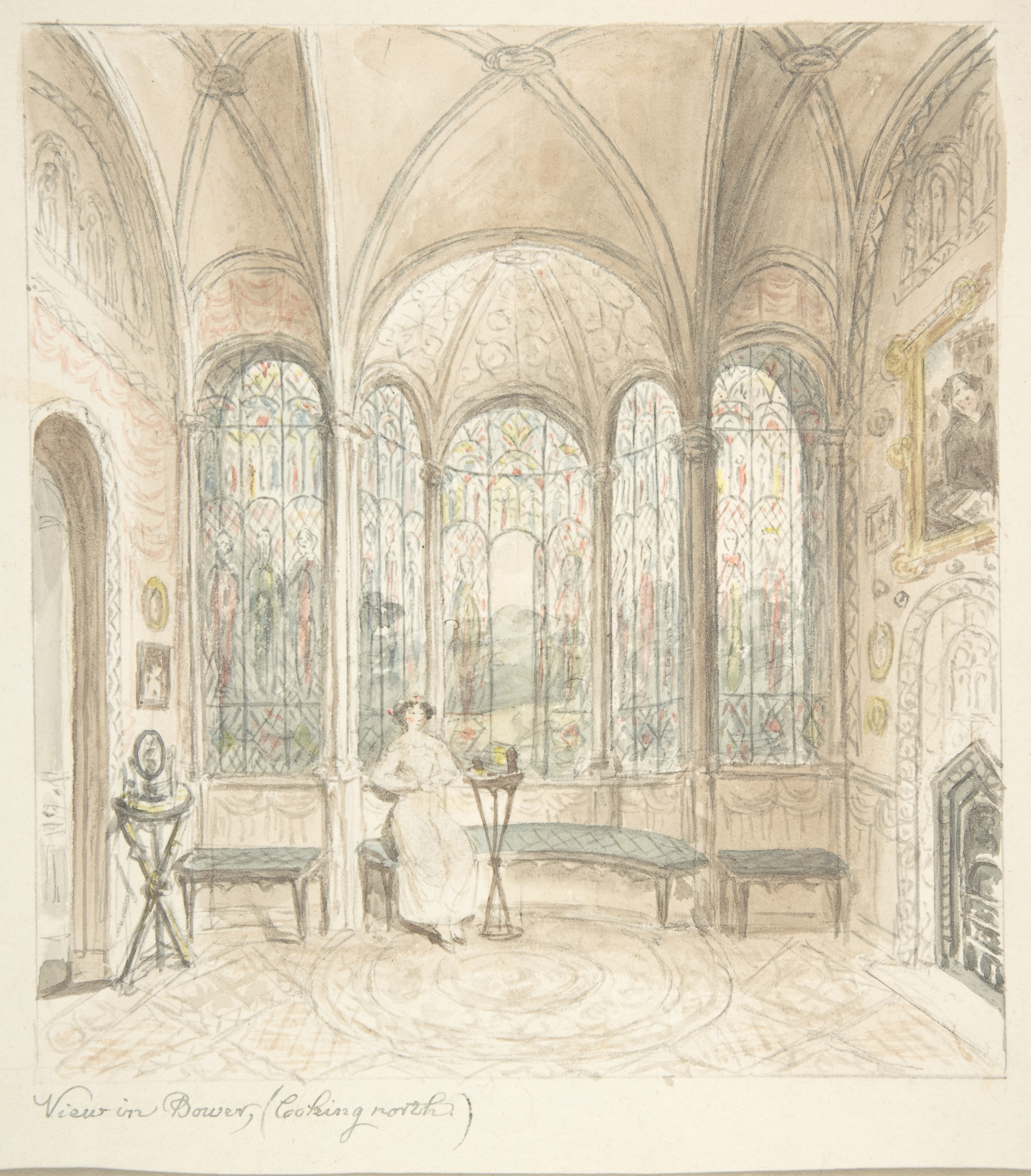

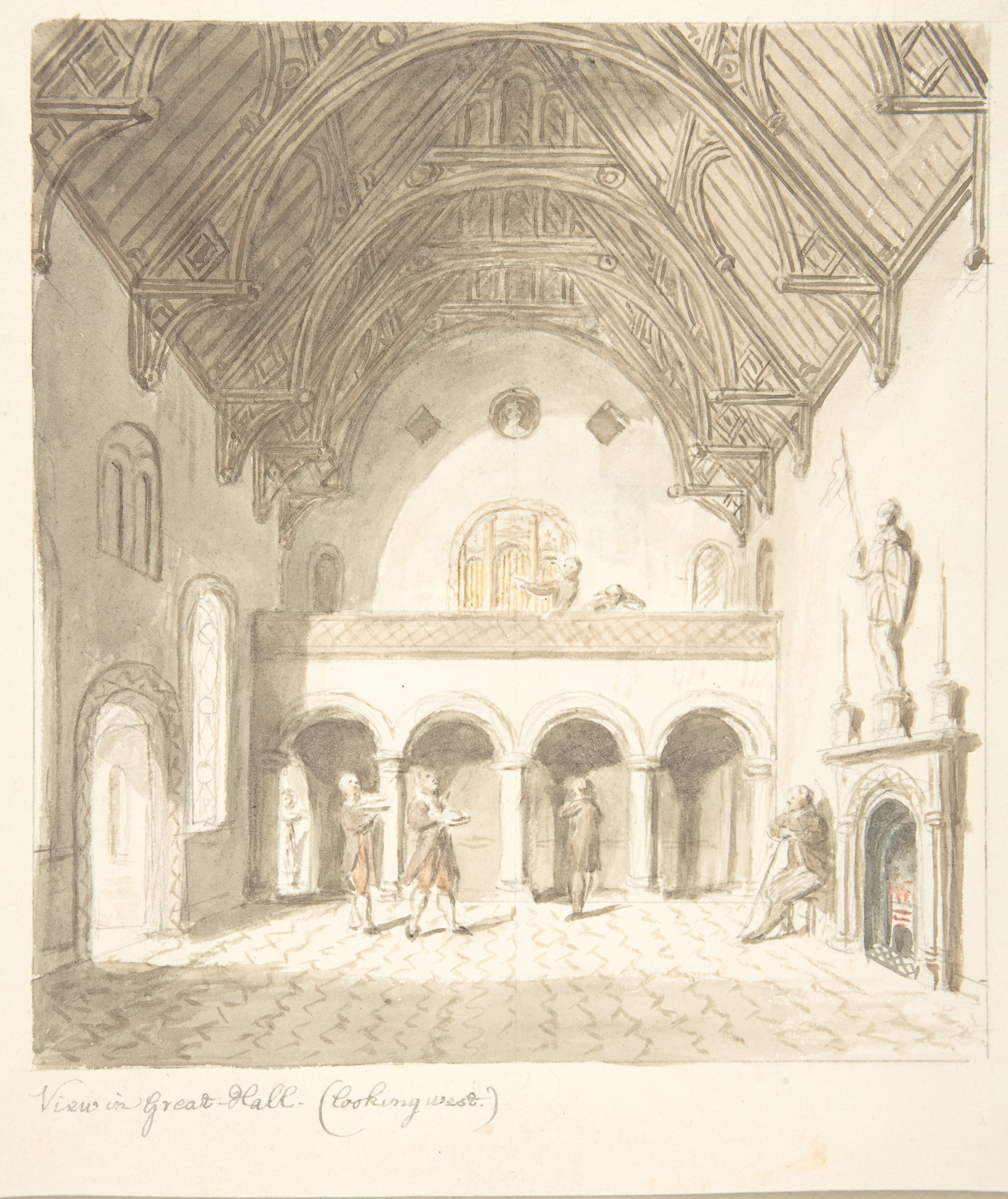

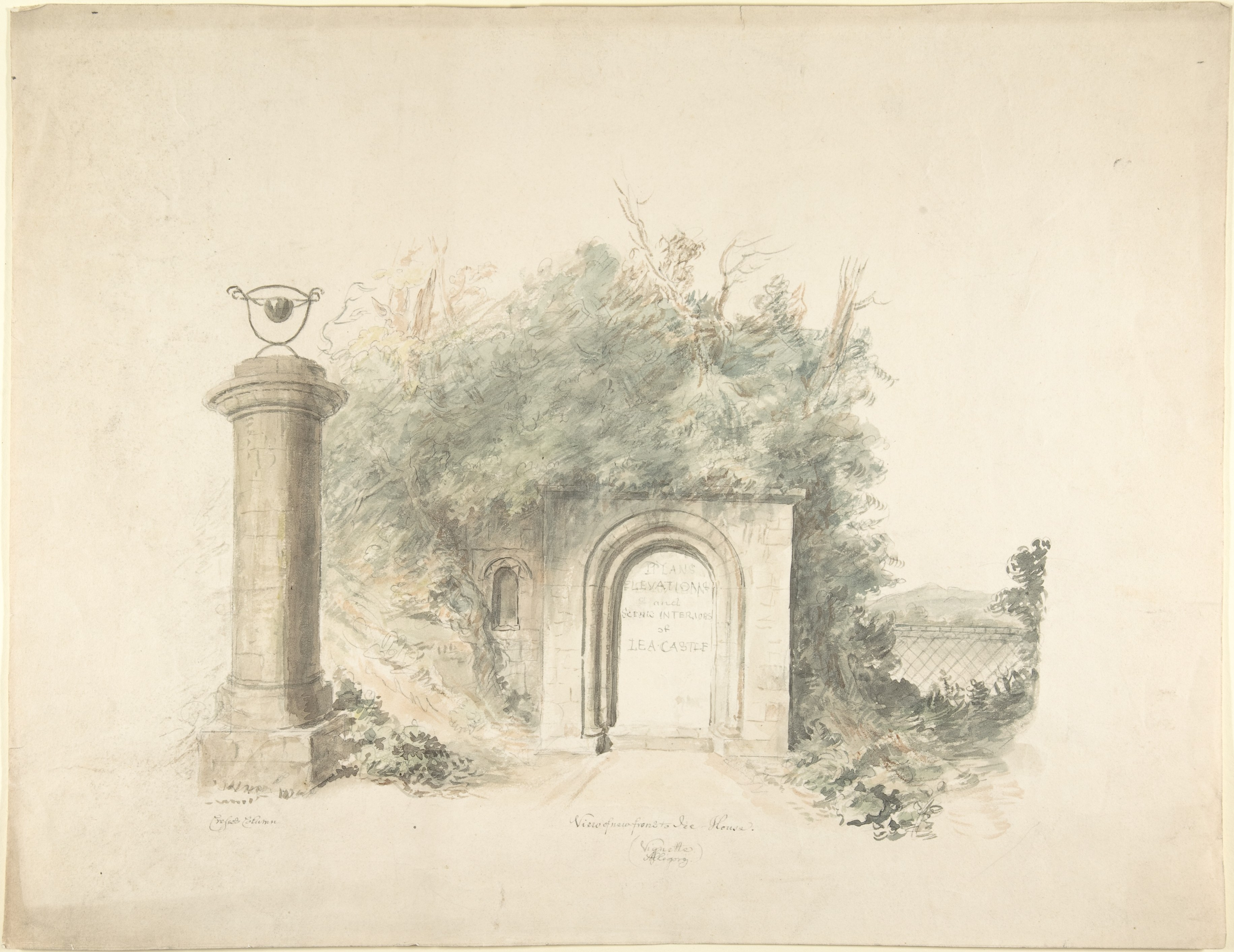

== Publications ==
His first important published work was his Specimens of Ancient Sculpture and Painting, published in parts between 1780 and 1794. In his introduction to the Specimens Carter wrote that, "having explored at different times various parts of England for the purpose of taking sketches and drawing of the remains of ancient sculpture and painting, his aim is to perpetuate such as he has been so fortunate as to meet with by engraving them." While the Specimens was in progress, Carter also published Views of Ancient Buildings in England (drawn and engraved by himself) in six volumes (London, 1786–93). In 1785 he began another extensive work, The Ancient Architecture of England (1795–1814). John Summerson wrote that, in this work, "details of Gothic buildings are more sympathetically represented than in any previous books." The chronological arrangement of the architectural examples was an important feature and prepared the way for subsequent writers on the sequence of styles; referring to Gothic architecture as "Pointed architecture", he divided it into phases, such as "First Pointed" and "Second Pointed", classifications which remained in use well into the 19th century. A new and enlarged edition of the Ancient Buildings was published in 1845 (two parts, folio) by John Britton.

Between 1795 and 1813 Carter was further engaged in preparing plans, elevations, sections, and specimens of the architecture of ecclesiastical buildings, which were published at intervals by the Society of Antiquaries

An important aspect of Carter's work was a series of more than 200 papers published in the Gentleman's Magazine between 1798 and his death in 1817 as "Pursuits of Architectural Innovation". These papers partly consist of a series of attacks on contemporaries engaged in the restoration of buildings and monuments. During this period – dominated by the Napoleonic wars – Carter appealed to the patriotism of his audience in his advocacy of the Gothic, by portraying the English Middle Ages, as a time of national glory and enlightened patronage, culminating in the reign of Edward III. The articles were signed simply "An Architect", but Carter's authorship could not be concealed.

== Architectural work ==
Carter built little as an architect. A significant work however was Milner Hall, the Catholic chapel at Winchester, commissioned in 1791–2 by the priest John Milner following the Second Relief Act, which allowed the erection of Roman Catholic places of worship, on the condition that they were without steeples and bells. Entered through a Norman gateway salvaged from a demolished church, the chapel, stuccoed in imitation of stone, had details and furnishings imitated from various Perpendicular models.

== Death ==
Towards the autumn of 1816 his health began to decline. In the spring of the following year dropsy made its appearance, and he died in Upper Eaton Street, Pimlico, on 8 September 1817, aged 69. He was buried at Hampstead, an inscribed stone to his memory being placed on the south side of the church. His collection, including drawings and antiquities, was sold by auction at Sotheby's on 26 February 1818.
