= Sacred Heart Church, Petworth =

Our Lady of Sorrows Church
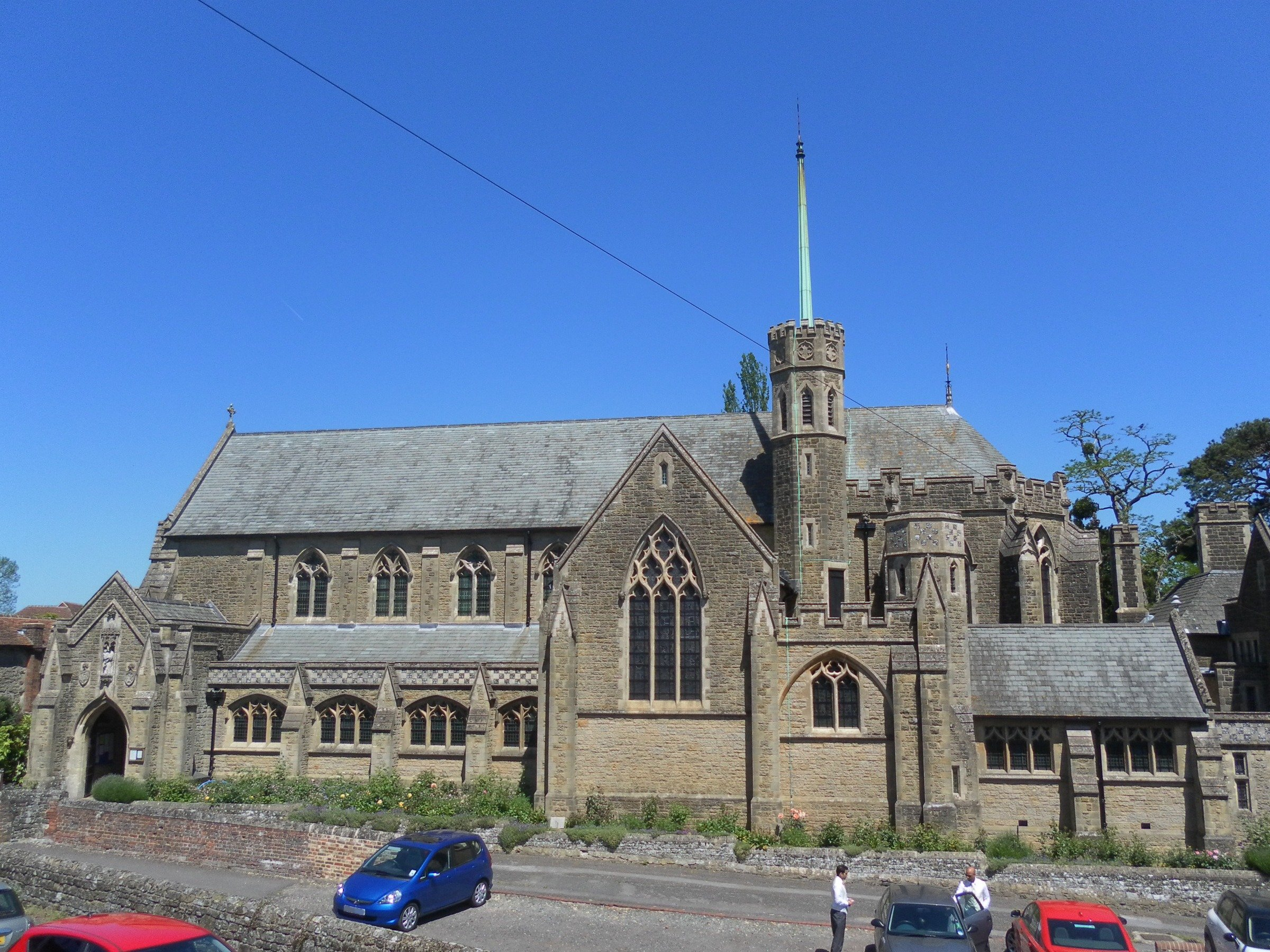
- Our Lady of Sorrows Church
- 50.9861°N 0.6065°W
- Location: Petworth, West Sussex
- Country: England
- Denomination: Roman Catholic
- Website: SacredHeartPetworth.org.uk

History
- Status: Active
- Founder: Charles Willock Dawes
- Dedication: Most Sacred Heart of Jesus

Architecture
- Functional status: Parish church
- Heritage designation: Grade II listed
- Designated: 22 May 1985
- Architect: Frederick Walters
- Style: Gothic Revival
- Groundbreaking: 1894
- Completed: 1896

Administration
- Province: Southwark
- Diocese: Arundel and Brighton
- Deanery: Cathedral
- Parish: Petworth and Midhurst

Sacred Heart Church is a Roman Catholic Parish church in Petworth, West Sussex, England. It was built in 1896 and designed by Frederick Walters. It is situated on Angel Street to the north of Petworth Cottage Museum in the centre of the town. It is a Gothic Revival church and a Grade II listed building.

== History ==
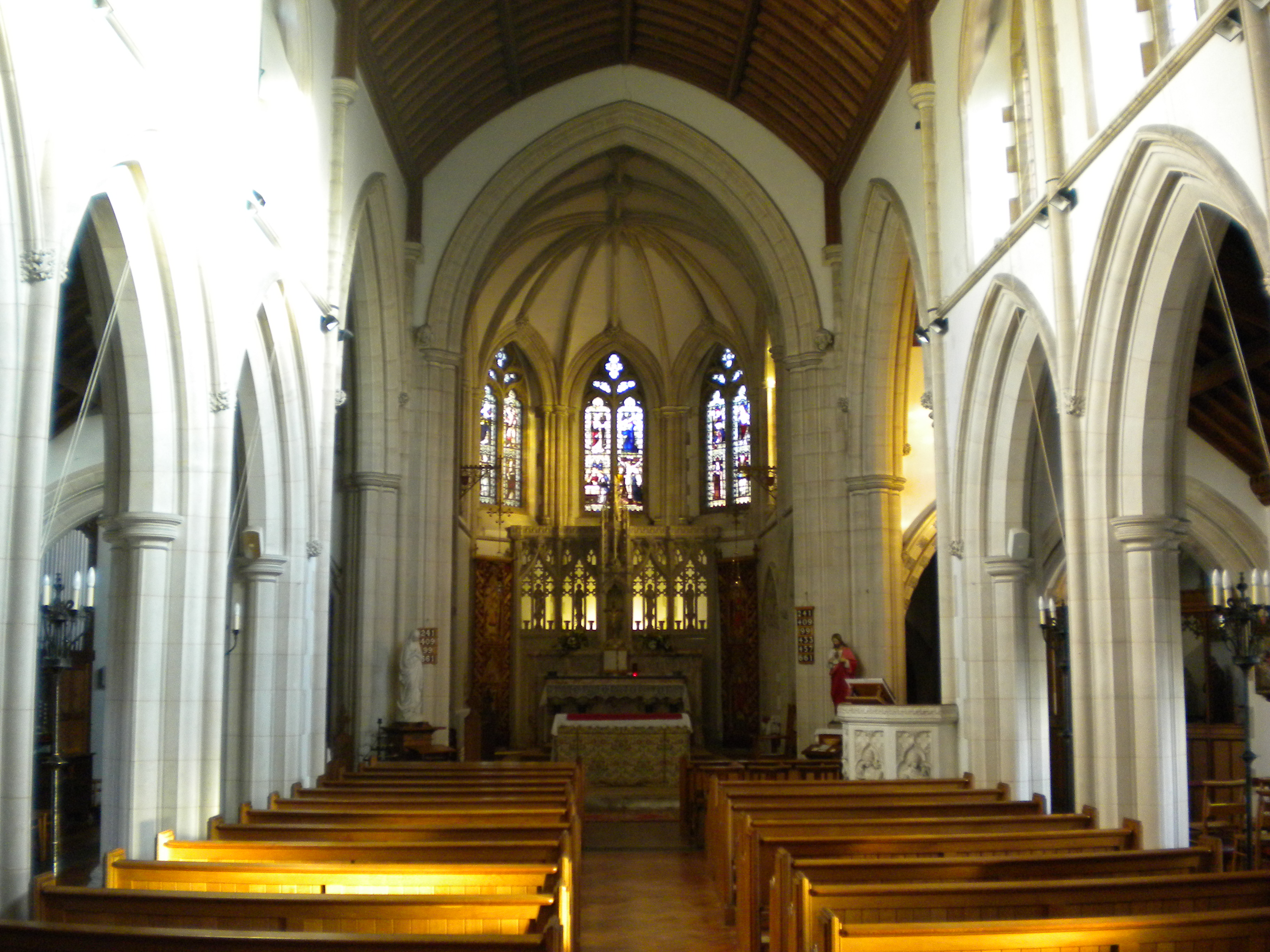
Interior

=== Foundation ===
Before the church was built, the local Catholic population of Petworth worshiped at St Richard's Church in Burton Park. Three years after St Richard's was built, a mission was established at Petworth. A priest would travel out to Petworth from Burton Park to say Mass there. After the presbytery, Duncton Cottage, in Burton Park deteriorated to become unliveable, the priest moved house to Petworth.

=== Construction ===
In 1893, Charles Willock Dawes from Burton Hill bought the site of the church. In 1894, the foundation stone was laid. Charles Dawes commissioned Frederick Walters to design the church. Dawes preferred the church to be modelled on Sacred Heart Church in Hove. Construction of the church cost £15,000. The house for the priest was designed in consultation with the first parish priest, Canon Lalor. In 1896, the church was opened. The stained-glass windows of the church were designed by Lavers & Westlake and the brass by Hardman & Co. The first Mass in the church was the funeral of Charles Dawes' wife. On 25 December 1899, Dawes also died and the two are buried in the church crypt. Dawes left Burton Hill to the Society of Jesus as a retirement community for the order.

== Parish ==
The parish also includes the Church of the Divine Motherhood and St Francis of Assisi in Midhurst and St Anthony and St George Church in Duncton. They are both Grade II listed buildings.

=== Church of the Divine Motherhood and St Francis of Assisi ===
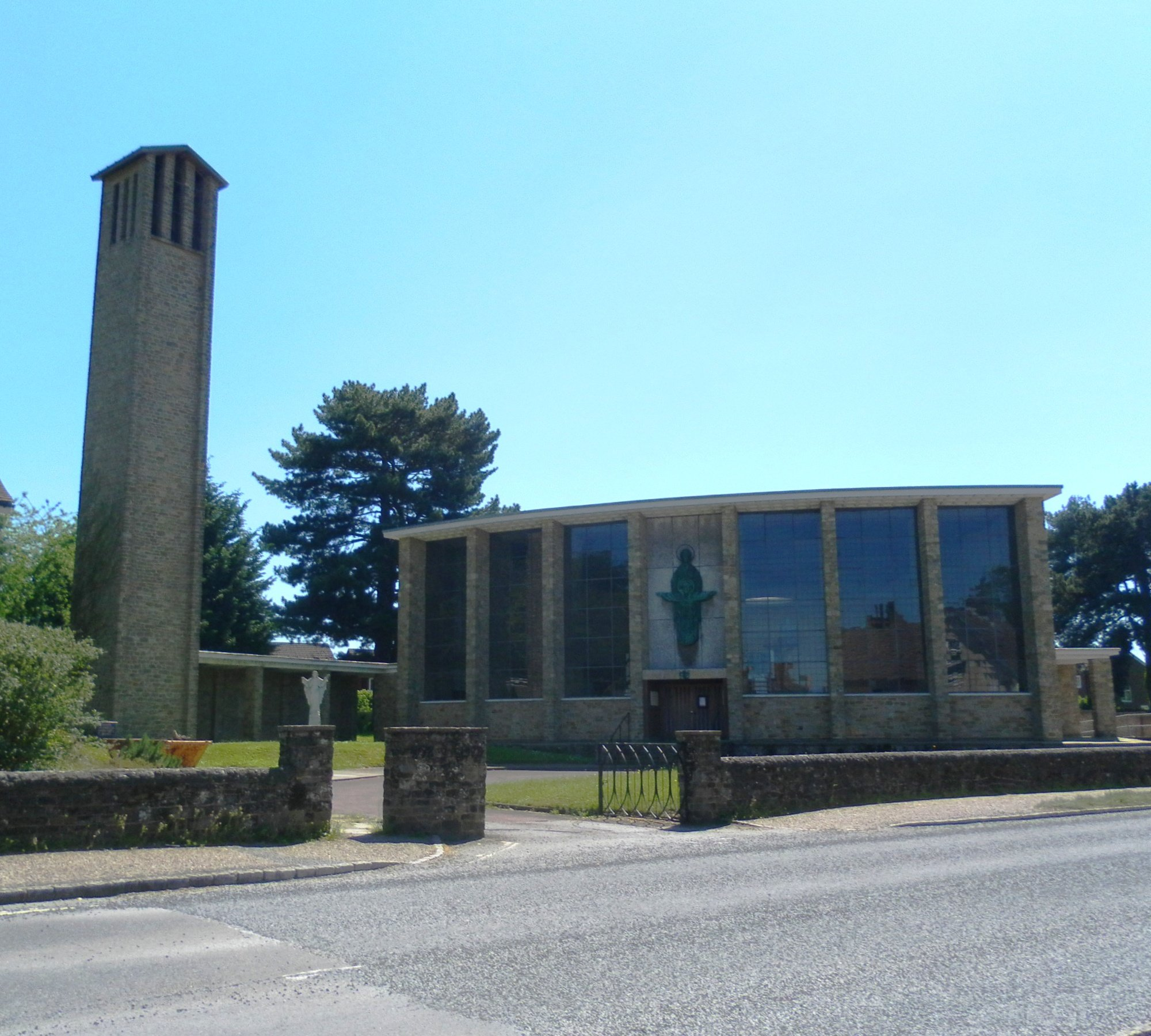
Church of the Divine Motherhood and St Francis of Assisi, Midhurst

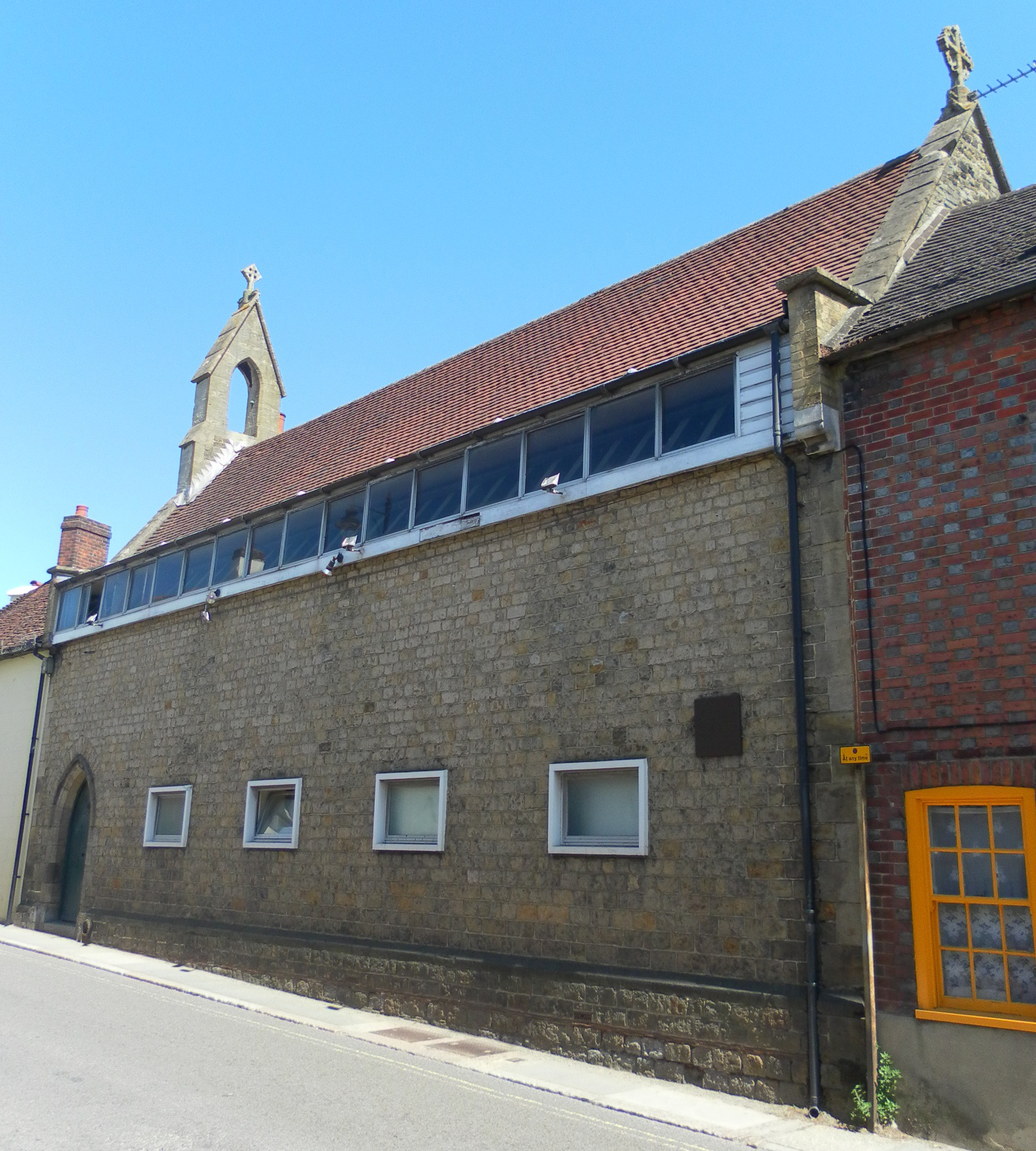
Former St Francis of Assisi Church on Rumbolds Hill, Midhurst

During the Reformation period the local Catholic community worshiped at Cowdray House. In 1767, Viscount Montagu paid for a Catholic mission in Eastbourne. In 1858, the mission stopped with the ending of the lease on the place of worship. The Church of the Divine Motherhood and St Francis of Assisi replaced another church, St Francis of Assisi Church, which was built from 1868 to 1869. It still exists and was designed by Charles Alban Buckler who also designed St Richard of Chichester Church in Slindon. When the present Church of the Divine Motherhood and St Francis of Assisi was opened, the old church became a restaurant. In 1888, the Sisters of Mercy opened St Margaret's School in the area. In 1891, with the local Catholic population increasing in number, the site for the present church was bought.

In 1957, construction on the Church of the Divine Motherhood and St Francis of Assisi began. In 1962, the church was opened. In 1965, a sculpture of Madonna and Child by Richard Guyatt was installed above the main entrance. In May 1966, the church was consecrated. The church, without its tower, cost £35,000. The furniture and interior decoration was not done by the architect, Guy Morgan, and he complained that his "design has been murdered … the terrible seats, ghastly altar and the awful side chapels … all this has nearly broken my heart." Yet, the church was listed as a Grade II building, because of its fittings, design and sculpture. Inside the church there is chapel dedicated to the Passion and altars dedicated to St Francis of Assisi, St Patrick, and Blessed Margaret Pole. A sculptor from Sussex, Michael Clark, designed the crucifix in the church.

=== St Anthony and St George Church ===
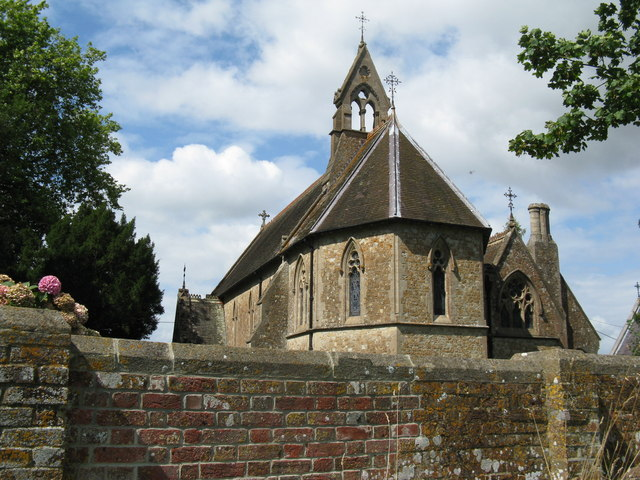
St Anthony and St George Church, Duncton

St Anthony and St George Church was founded by Anthony Wright Biddulph, the owner of Burton Park. In 1868, the foundation stone of the church was laid a few hundred metres from St Richard's Church in Burton Park, by the Bishop of Southwark, Thomas Grant. Construction of the church came to a total cost of £5,000, the architect was Gilbert Blount and the builders were John Ellis of Chichester. The church was consecrated by Cardinal Manning. In 1895, Biddulph died and was buried in the church crypt. It became a Grade II listed building on 27 April 2015.

=== Times ===
Sacred Heart Church has two Sunday Masses at: 5:30pm on Saturday and at 11:00am on Sunday. The Church of the Divine Motherhood and St Francis of Assisi also has two Masses at: 6:00pm on Saturday and at 9:30am on Sunday. St Anthony and St George Church has one Sunday Mass at 8:00am.

== See also ==
- List of current places of worship in Chichester District
- Roman Catholic Diocese of Arundel and Brighton
- Media related to Sacred Heart Church, Petworth at Wikimedia Commons
- Media related to St Anthony and St George, Duncton at Wikimedia Commons
- Media related to Church of the Divine Motherhood and St Francis of Assisi, Midhurst at Wikimedia Commons
