= St Peter's Church, Winchester =

Coordinates: 51.06499°N 1.31566°W

St Peter's Church
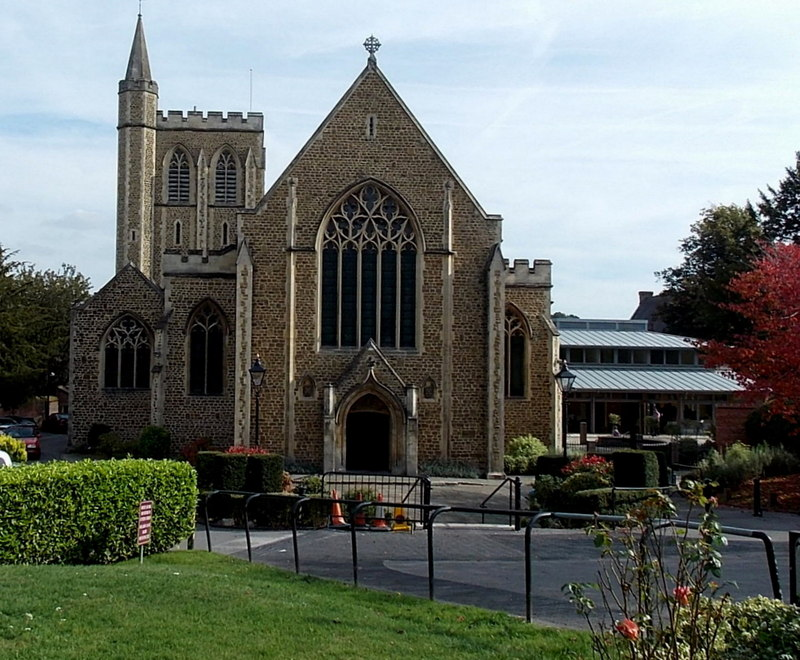
- Front entrance

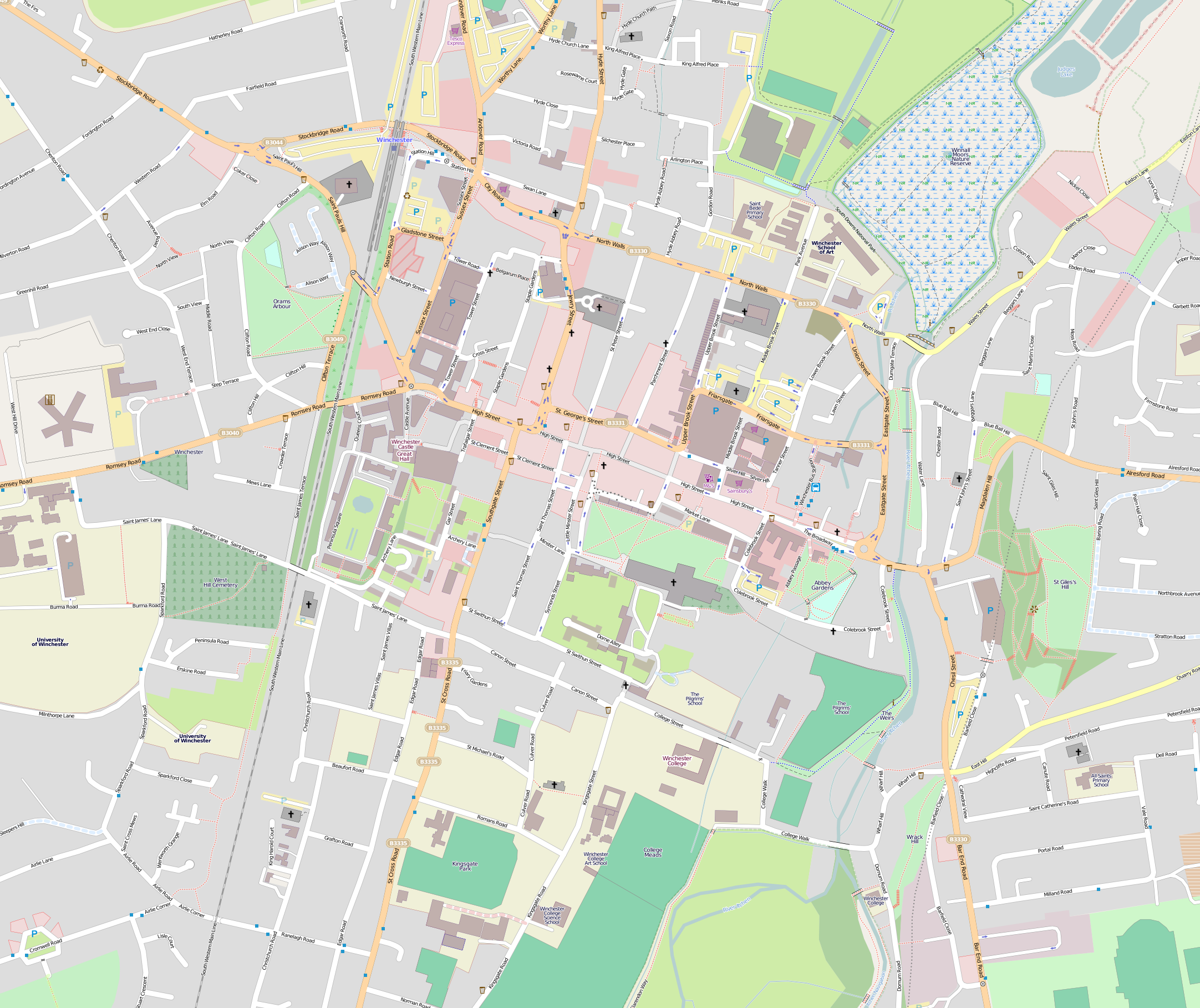
- Location in Winchester
- OS grid reference: SU 48102 29731
- Location: Winchester
- Country: England
- Denomination: Roman Catholic
- Website: catholicwinchester.org.uk

History
- Status: Active
- Dedication: Saint Peter
- Consecrated: 22 September 1938

Architecture
- Functional status: Parish church
- Heritage designation: Grade II listed
- Designated: 24 March 1950
- Architect: Frederick Walters
- Style: Gothic revival
- Groundbreaking: 1924
- Completed: 15 July 1926
- Construction cost: £23,000

Administration
- Province: Southwark
- Diocese: Portsmouth
- Deanery: Central Hampshire
- Parish: St Peter & the Winchester Martyrs

St Peter's Church is a Roman Catholic church in Winchester, England. It was built in 1924 and designed by Frederick Walters in the Gothic revival style. It is situated on Jewry Street, backing onto St Peter's Street, next to Milner Hall, in the centre of Winchester. It is a Grade II listed building.

== History ==
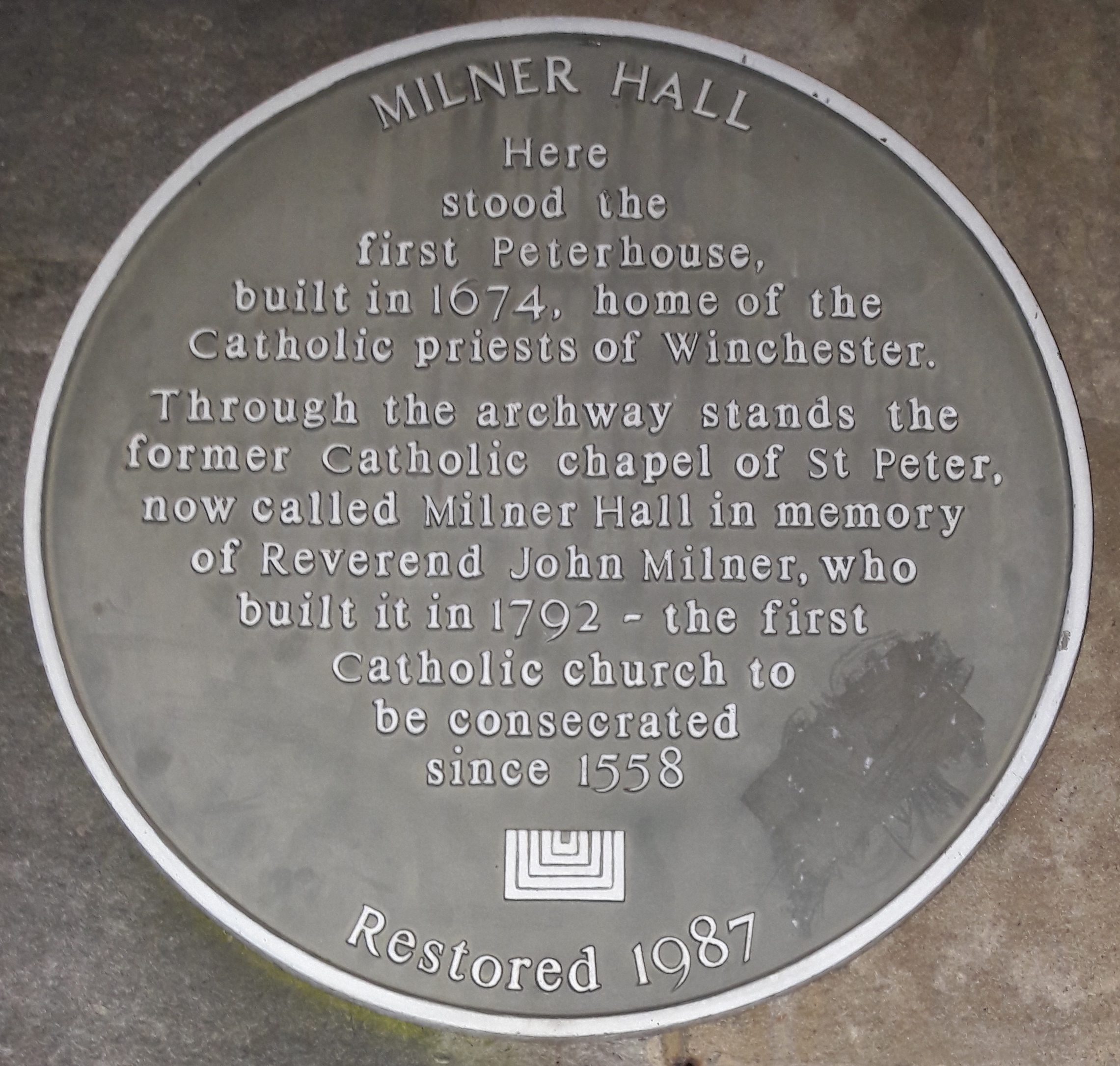
Plaque on Milner Hall

=== Foundation ===
After the English Reformation there is recorded evidence of a Catholic community in Winchester. In 1575, Cardinal Allen wrote that there were sufficient Catholics in Winchester to constitute the only'district' in south England. Mass was said in My Lady West's House in Fishmonger Street between 1579 and 1583. The building is now the Royal Hotel. Later the house was owned by Roger Corham, he built a residence for a priest called St Peter's House. Above the ground floor of the residence was a chapel. From 1740, a separate chapel was built in the garden of the residence.

In 1779, John Milner, later Bishop Milner, became the resident priest in Winchester. In 1784, he paid for an extension to be built onto the chapel. Later, he rebuilt the chapel in the Gothic revival style. The architect was his friend John Carter and the chapel was consecrated on 5 December 1792. The building still exists, it is called Milner Hall, was restored in 1986 and acts as the parish hall next to the church.

=== Construction ===
In 1924, building work started on St Peter's Church. It was designed by Frederick Walters, who was the architect of many churches in south England. The church cost £23,000, was built by the Hussellwhite of Basingstoke construction firm and was opened on 15 July 1926. Twelve years later, on 22 September 1938, the church was consecrated.

=== Developments ===
The stained glass windows in the chancel and south chapel were built by Burlison and Grylls. In the lady chapel, the windows were designed by Arthur Edward Buss (1905–1999).

In 1968, a presbytery was built next door to the church. In 1986, this presbytery became a parish centre when a new priest's residence was constructed elsewhere.

== Parish ==
St Peter's Church is in the same parish as four other churches: St Gregory the Great Church in New Alresford has its Sunday Mass at 11:00am, St Margaret of Scotland Church in Tichborne, St Stephen's Church in Olivers Battery has its Sunday Mass at 9:15am and St Thomas More Church in Stockbridge has its Sunday Mass at 9:00am.

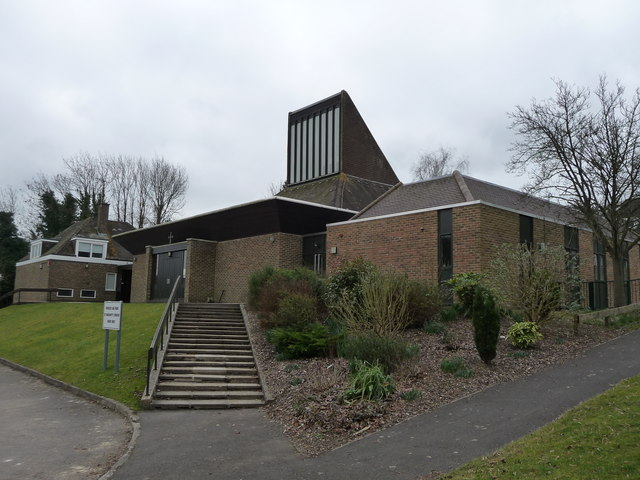
St Gregory the Great Church, Alresford

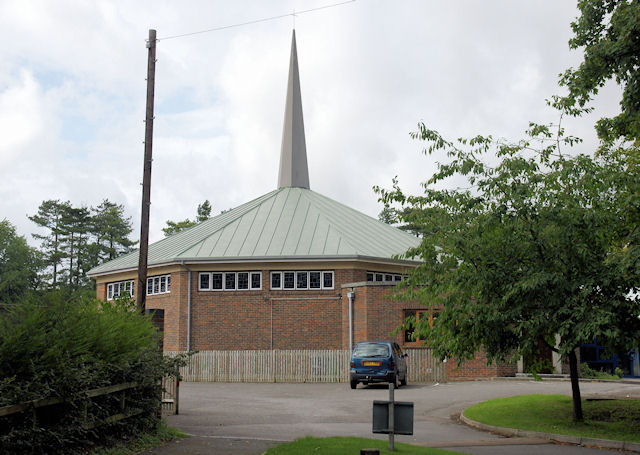
St Stephen's Church in Olivers Battery

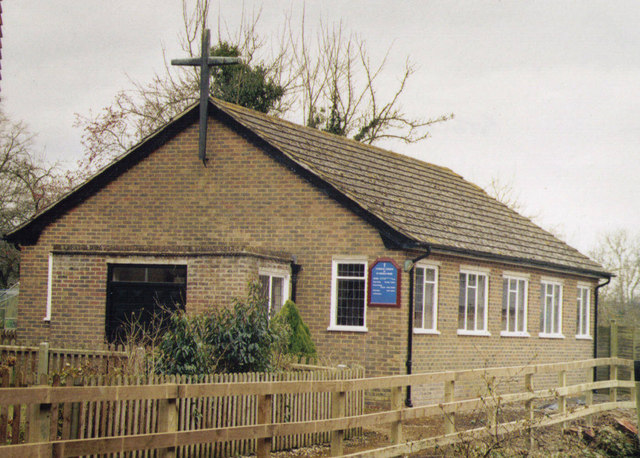
St Thomas More Church, Stockbridge

== See also ==
- Diocese of Portsmouth
