= St Anne's House, Vauxhall =

Coordinates: 51.486126°N 0.120155°W

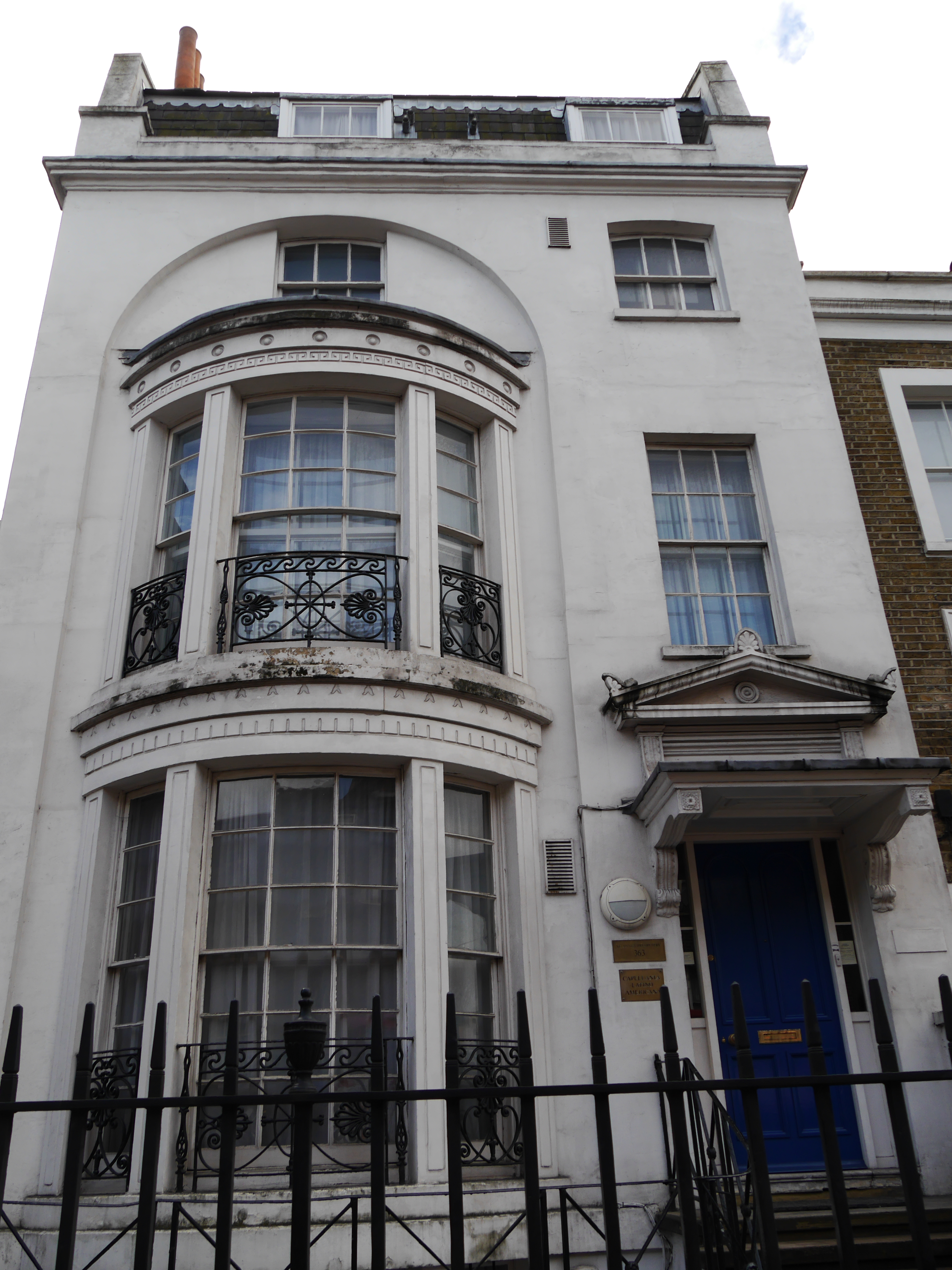
St Anne's House, Vauxhall, 2014

St Anne's House, 363 Kennington Lane, Vauxhall, London SE11, is the presbytery for St Anne's Church next door.

It was built in the early 19th century, designed by Joseph Gandy in the Soanian style, and has been Grade II listed since 1981.
