= Frederick Walters =

Scottish architect (1849–1931)

Frederick Arthur Walters (5 February 1849–3 December 1931) was a Scottish architect working in the Victorian and Edwardian eras, notable for his Roman Catholic churches.

== Life ==
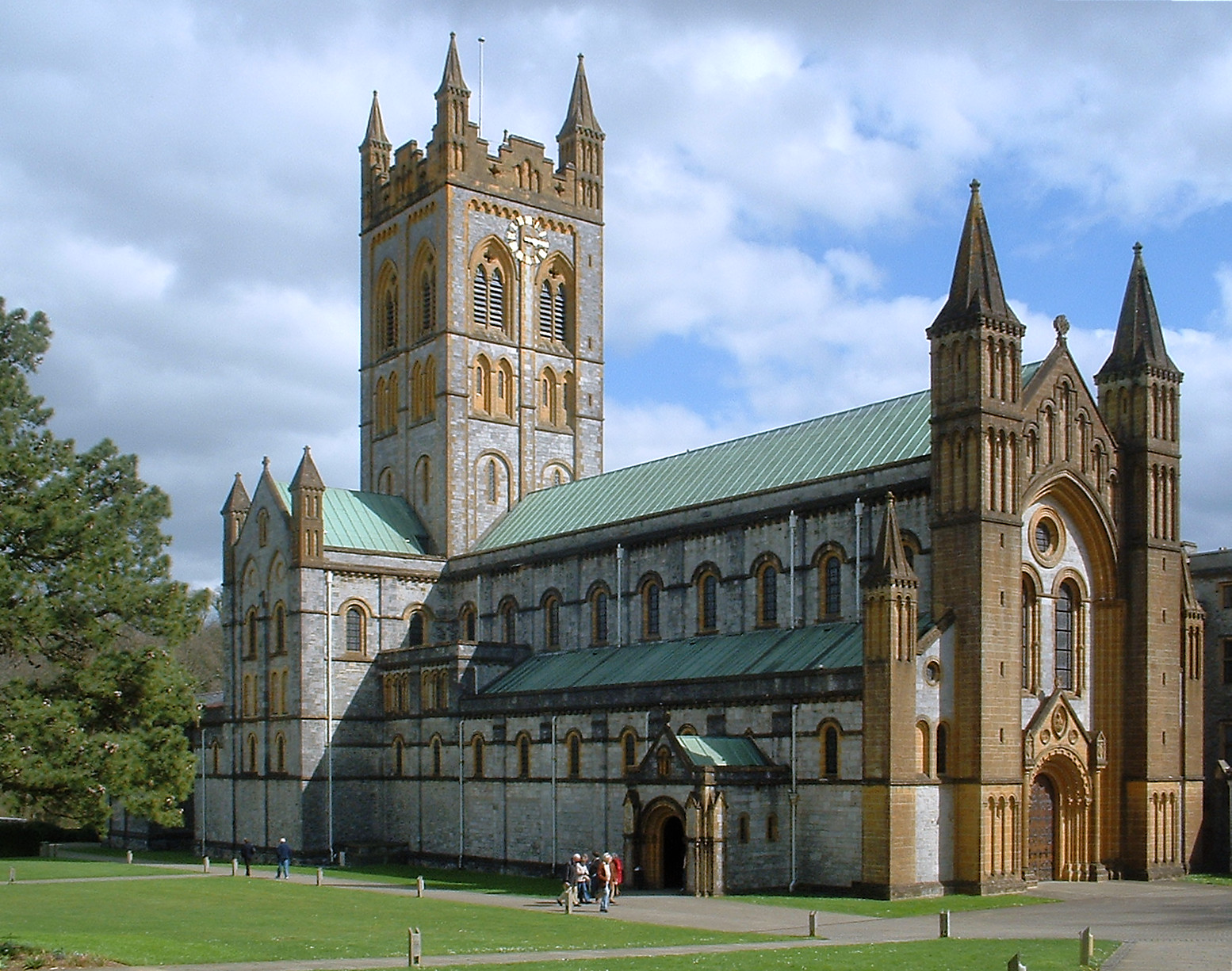
Buckfast Abbey

Walters was born on 5 February 1849 at 6 South Terrace, Brompton, London, the son of the architect Frederick Page Walters—with whom he served as an articled clerk for three years.

After working in the office of George Goldie for nine years, he formed his own architectural practice in 1878, taking his son, John Edward Walters, into partnership in 1924.

Walters, a Roman Catholic, was responsible for more than fifty Roman Catholic Churches, including Buckfast Abbey and Ealing Abbey. He also designed the seminary building at St. John's Seminary (Wonersh), which is on the statutory list of buildings of architectural and historical importance.

Walters died on 3 December 1931 at St Mildred's, Ewell.

== Works ==
Work	Date	Comments
St Joseph Church, Roehampton	1881	Style:Gothic Revival
Sacred Heart Church Wimbledon	1884–1887	Style decorated Gothic
Douai School – main entrance and tower	1888	Style Tudor Gothic
Our Lady of Ransom Church, Eastbourne	1890–1903	Style Decorated Gothic; Grade II-listed
St. John's Seminary (Wonersh)	1891	Style Dutch Jacobean
The Holy Ghost, Franciscan Friary Chilworth	1892	Grade II listed; style Late Gothic
Church of the Most Precious Blood, Southwark	1892–1893	Style: Romanesque revival
The Sacred Heart, Trott Street Battersea	1892–1893	Style: Romanesque revival
The Holy Name and Our Lady of the Sacred Heart Bow Common	1893–1894	Consecrated by Cardinal Vaughan 30 June 1894
Sacred Heart Church, Petworth	1894–1896	Windows by Lavers, Barraud and Westlake
Clergy House, Church of English Martyrs Walworth	1893–1894	
St Joseph's Church, Dorking	1895	
St John the Evangelist Church, Heron's Ghyll	1895–1897	Consecrated by Bishop Peter Amigo 7 September 1904
St Thomas's Church, Sevenoaks	1896	
St Mary of the Angels, Worthing	1897–1907	Originally built by Henry Clutton 1864 & 1873, extended by Walters
Ealing Abbey	1897–1935	Altered following bomb damage suffered in 1940
St Mary and St Michael, Lukin Street, London E1	1898	Originally built by William Wardell 1856; chancel altered by Walters 1898
Our Lady and St Peter's Church, East Grinstead	1898	
Church of St Anne, Kennington Lane Vauxhall	1900–1903	Consecrated by Cardinal Bourne 26 October 1903; style: late Gothic
St Joseph's Church, Brighton – west front	1900–1901	Grade II* listed
Church of Guardian Angels Mile End Road, London	1901–1903	Style: Perpendicular Gothic
St Elizabeth of Portugal Church, The Vineyard, Richmond, London	1903	Rebuilding of the chancel, presbytery and tower, originally constructed in 1824
St Winefride Church, South Wimbledon, London	1904–1905	Style: Romanesque revival
St Edmund Church, Godalming	1905–1906	Grade II listed building
St Augustine's College and Abbey School Westgate-on-Sea	1905–1915	Grade II listed building
Buckfast Abbey	1905–1937	Consecrated 25 August 1932
Our Lady of Pity and St Simon Stock, Putney	1906	Commenced by J C Radford and completed by Walters
St Mary of the Angels, Canton, Cardiff	1907	Style: Romanesque revival; consecrated 30 October 1907
Church of St Anselm and St Cecilia, Lincoln's Inn Fields	1908–1909	On site of former Sardinian Chapel; style: Continental renaissance
Church of Our Lady of Lourdes, Ashby-de-la-Zouch	1910	
Chapel at Wimbledon College	1910	
St Joseph's Church, Grayshott, Hampshire	1911	Grade II listed building
St Wilfred, Kennington Park	1914–1915	Style: Perpendicular Gothic; damaged by bomb November 1940, restored 1948–49
St Tarcisius Church, Camberley	1923–1924	Windows by Paul Woodroffe
St Peter's Church, Jewry Street Winchester	1926	
Church of Our Lady of Lourdes, Harpenden	1928	
