= Taylor Woodrow Construction =

UK construction firm

- Type: Subsidiary of Vinci SA
- Industry: Civil engineering
- Founded: 1937
- Headquarters: London, England
- Key people: Jerome Stubler, Chairman Gilles Godard, CEO Julian Gatward, MD
- Revenue: £21.3 million (2019)
- Operating income: £0.8 million (2019)
- Net income: £0.6 million (2019)
- Number of employees: 176 (2019)
- Parent: Vinci SA
- Website: www.taylorwoodrow.com

Taylor Woodrow Construction, branded as Taylor Woodrow, is a UK-based civil engineering contractor and one of four operating divisions of Vinci Construction UK. The business was launched in 2011, combining civil engineering operations from the former Taylor Woodrow group and from Vinci UK - formerly Norwest Holst.

Taylor Woodrow was one of the largest housebuilding and general construction companies in Britain. It merged with rival George Wimpey in July 2007 to create the Taylor Wimpey housebuilding group. In September 2008, Taylor Woodrow Construction was acquired by Vinci plc from Taylor Wimpey; initially branded as part of Vinci Construction, the civil engineering division reverted to the name Taylor Woodrow Construction in 2011 to reflect its civil engineering heritage.

== History ==
=== Taylor Woodrow ===
==== Early years ====
The Taylor Woodrow business was founded in Blackpool in 1921 as a housebuilder by Frank Taylor and his uncle, Jack Woodrow, creating the Taylor Woodrow name. In 1930, Taylor moved to London and his business eventually established headquarters in Southall. In 1935, the housebuilding business was floated on the London Stock Exchange as Taylor Woodrow Estates. In 1937, Taylor Woodrow Construction was formed and, after a modest start, the company was soon engaged in defence work. Shortly following the outbreak of the Second World War in 1939, private housing development stopped, and for six years Taylor Woodrow built military camps, airfields and factories, and worked on the Mulberry harbour units.

==== 1945–2008 ====
By 1945, Taylor Woodrow had become a substantial construction business, and it expanded into domestic civil construction work and internationally, working in East Africa (it was involved in the notorious Groundnut Scheme), then west and South Africa and, in the 1950s, Australia, Canada and the middle east. In the UK, Taylor Woodrow Construction became a prominent contractor in the power generation industry, building first conventional power stations and then the world's first commercial nuclear power station, Calder Hall. Hartlepool, Hinkley Point A, Wylfa and Sizewell A followed. In the private sector, notable contracts included terminal buildings at London Heathrow airport, and the Liverpool Metropolitan Cathedral.

Work in the middle east helped grow Taylor Woodrow’s international construction business and by the mid 1970s overseas profits accounted for two thirds of group profits. The centrepiece was the joint venture with Costain to build the dry docks at Port Rashid, Dubai, described as "the largest single overseas contract ever undertaken by the British construction industry".

However, by the 1980s, middle east construction was declining and the parent Taylor Woodrow group was increasingly focused on housebuilding and the commercial property market. Taylor Woodrow Construction was part of the Channel Tunnel consortium (completed in 1994) but its operations were less important to the group. A series of mergers and acquisitions culminated in the £6 billion merger with George Wimpey forming Taylor Wimpey in March 2007, and just over a year later, in September 2008, Vinci plc, the British subsidiary of France's Vinci SA, acquired Taylor Woodrow Construction from Taylor Wimpey for £74m.

==== Notable projects undertaken ====
Major projects completed by Taylor Woodrow included:

- the Mulberry harbours completed in 1944
- the Tanganyika groundnut scheme completed in 1951
- Calder Hall nuclear power station completed in 1956
- Hinkley Point A nuclear power station completed in 1965
- Westminster City Hall completed in 1965
- Sizewell A nuclear power station completed in 1966
- Liverpool Metropolitan Cathedral completed in 1967
- Ronan Point completed in 1968
- Wylfa Nuclear Power Station completed in 1971
- Port Rashid in Dubai completed in 1972
- Kensington Town Hall in London completed in 1976
- Wolverhampton Civic Centre completed in 1978
- Queen's Medical Centre (QMC) in Nottingham, completed around 1979
- Hartlepool Nuclear Power Station completed in 1983
- Heathrow Terminal 4 completed in 1986
- the Channel Tunnel completed in 1994
- the Riverside Stadium on Teesside completed in 1995
- Amersham and Wycombe Hospitals completed in 2000
- the redevelopment of the Royal Albert Hall completed in 2003
- the Princess Royal University Hospital at Farnborough completed in 2003
- the National Assembly for Wales at Cardiff Bay completed in 2006
- the King's Cross Western Ticketing Hall completed in 2006

=== Vinci Construction UK and predecessors ===
Today's Vinci Construction UK started as a concrete specialist, Holst & Co, founded in 1918 in London by Danish civil engineers Knud Holst and Christian Lunoe. Five years later, in Liverpool, another business, Norwest Construction was founded in Liverpool. The two businesses merged in 1969 to form Norwest Holst, which - during the 1980s - was the largest privately owned construction group in the UK.

In 1991, a French company, SGE, acquired a majority shareholding in Norwest Holst, which, in 2002, was renamed Vinci plc and acquired London-based contractor Crispin & Borst. Weaver plc was acquired in 2007.

=== Taylor Woodrow Construction ===
In early 2009, Vinci planned to reorganise all UK operations under one name, but the Taylor Woodrow brand was eventually retained (though the company's 'teamwork' logo was retained by Taylor Wimpey). In 2011, the civil engineering division of Vinci Construction UK was rebranded as Taylor Woodrow in recognition of "its world-class heritage in civil engineering projects".

In 2021, Taylor Woodrow Construction generated a profit of £8.6m on revenues of £319m. The business had increased its focus on new energy markets and won four commissions from Transport for London for pre-construction work on stations in London.

=== Notable projects undertaken ===
Major projects completed by Taylor Woodrow Construction following the reorganisation and rebranding included:

- the Western Concourse at London King's Cross railway station completed in 2012
- the Victoria Underground station North Ticketing Hall completed in 2017
- the enlarged ticket hall at Tottenham Court Road tube station for Crossrail completed in 2017
- Allerton waste recovery park completed in 2018
- Old Oak Common traction maintenance depot expansion for Crossrail completed in 2018
- the new ticket hall and entrance at White Hart Lane railway station completed in 2019
- the redevelopment of Crown Point Train Maintenance Depot in Norwich completed in 2021
- the expansion of Whitechapel station for Crossrail completed in 2021
- Edmonton EcoPark South due to be completed in 2023 (Note: This project used "ultra-low" carbon concrete, a product Vinci Construction had been pioneering.)
- Old Oak Common Station due to be completed in 2030

Taylor Woodrow Construction is also involved in HS2 lots N1 and N2, working as part of joint venture, due to complete in 2031.
