= Taylor Wimpey =

British home construction company

Taylor Wimpey plc
- Type: Public limited company
- Traded as: LSE: TW.; FTSE 250 Component
- Industry: Housebuilding
- Founded: 1880; 146 years ago (George Wimpey) 1921; 105 years ago (Taylor Woodrow) 3 July 2007; 19 years ago (Merger of Taylor Woodrow and George Wimpey)
- Headquarters: High Wycombe, England, UK
- Key people: Robert Noel (chairman); Jennie Daly (CEO)
- Revenue: ▲£3,844.6 million (2025)
- Operating income: ▲£418.5 million (2025)
- Net income: ▼£100.4 million (2025)
- Website: taylorwimpey.co.uk

Taylor Wimpey plc (formerly Taylor Woodrow plc) is a home construction company in the United Kingdom. The company was created from the merger of rivals Taylor Woodrow and George Wimpey on 3 July 2007. Its headquarters are based in High Wycombe, England. It is listed on the London Stock Exchange and is a constituent of the FTSE 250 Index.

== History ==
=== Taylor Woodrow ===
Taylor Woodrow was founded in 1921 by 16-year-old Frank Taylor as Taylor, Woodrow Limited. Though Taylor had borrowed money to build two houses in Blackpool, as he was too young to form his own company, his uncle Jack Woodrow lent his name to the business.

In the 1930s, Taylor Woodrow diversified into building temporary hospitals, and thereby moved into general construction. Taylor Woodrow Homes constituted a relatively small part of the business, and with housing sales declining in the following 50 years, at the beginning of the 1980s, Taylor Woodrow Homes was still only building around 500 to 600 houses a year.

In January 2001, Taylor Woodrow acquired Bryant Group, a business founded in Birmingham in 1885 by Chris Bryant, for £556 million, and in October 2003 Taylor Woodrow acquired Wilson Connolly in a cash and shares deal worth £499 million.

=== George Wimpey ===
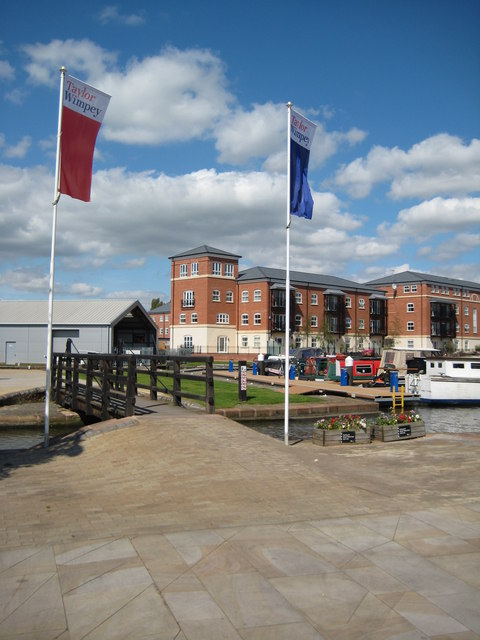
A Taylor Wimpey development at Diglis Basin in Worcester

George Wimpey was founded by George Wimpey and Walter Tomes as a stone-working partnership in 1880 in Hammersmith. Tomes would later sell his portion of the business in 1893.

George Wimpey died in 1913 at the age of 58, with his family putting the business up for sale in 1919. Godfrey Mitchell bought the firm and decided to retain the Wimpey name. George Wimpey completed its first residential development, the Greenford Park Estate, in 1928.

In the 1970s, George Wimpey became the United Kingdom's largest private housebuilder, selling 106,440 homes in the decade, and in the 1980s, George Wimpey began to reinforce Wimpey Homes as a brand, focusing on compact housing.

In March 1996, George Wimpey acquired McLean Homes, a business founded in 1934 by John McLean, from Tarmac. In August 2001, the business acquired McAlpine Homes from Alfred McAlpine in a £463 million deal, and in October 2002, George Wimpey went on to acquire Laing Homes, a premium housebuilder, from John Laing for £295 million.

=== Post-merger ===
In September 2008, Vinci bought the operations of Taylor Woodrow Construction and in April 2009, the remaining activities of Taylor Woodrow Construction in Ghana were sold to management. In March 2011, a property investment group backed by private equity firms acquired Taylor Wimpey's American and Canadian housebuilding businesses.

On 23 March 2020, Taylor Wimpey closed all of its UK sites and sales centres following lockdown measures in response to the COVID-19 pandemic in the United Kingdom. Six weeks after shutting down, the firm claimed to be "the first major housebuilder to unveil a timetable for restarting jobs", and said it would begin remobilisation in England and Wales on 4 May 2020. Taylor Wimpey said that although all its show homes had been closed during the lockdown, sales had continued, growing by 200 homes in comparison to the previous year's figures. The company also ran a manufacturing project during the pandemic to supply "GP surgeries and care homes with reusable 3D printed face visors".

On 2 March 2021, Taylor Wimpey announced it had set aside £125m to pay for cladding and fire safety repairs. By July 2024, the company had been forced to increase its provisions for expected fire safety work to £333m; in July 2025, a further £222m provision was made after intrusive surveys uncovered widespread issues with cavity barriers hidden behind brickwork and render, though the company aimed to recoup some of the costs from its supply chain firms. In February 2025, Taylor Wimpey said 203 buildings needed remediation work. These included a 450-home development at Victoria Wharf in Cardiff Bay; in November 2023, Taylor Wimpey had launched a £50 million damages claim against architects Holder Mathias over alleged defects in the buildings. Holder Mathias denied the claim. In another fire safety-related case, the company sued Galliford Try over alleged fire safety issues at a development (Rope Quays in Gosport) built by Morrison Construction, acquired by Galliford Try in March 2006 and now called Galliford Try Infrastructure.

In April 2023, Taylor Wimpey announced it had consulted staff on a £19m cost-saving plan that resulted in 450 job cuts and cost £8m to implement.

In May 2024, Taylor Wimpey was reported to be considering a bid for Legal & General's subsidiary Cala Homes, valued at around £1bn.

As the UK housing market contracted in November 2026, Taylor Wimpey started consultation on a redundancies programme.

== Operations ==
Taylor Wimpey's corporate head office is located at GateHouse in High Wycombe. There are 24 regional offices in the United Kingdom.

Taylor Wimpey was headed by Pete Redfern, chief executive of the company from July 2007. In December 2021, he announced plans to step down once a successor had been appointed. In February 2022, Taylor Wimpey announced that group operations director Jennie Daly would take over as chief executive in April 2022; she replaced Redfern at the company's AGM on 26 April 2022.

Irene Dorner, chair of Taylor Wimpey since February 2020, stepped down after the company's April 2023 AGM, replaced by former Land Securities executive Robert Noel.

== Sponsorships and awards ==
Taylor Wimpey was the main sponsor of St Johnstone F.C., for the football seasons of 2009 to 2011.

In 2016, Taylor Wimpey held its Project 2020 Open Design Competition in an attempt to find a design for a "home of the future". The project was launched in partnership with RIBA.

== Controversies ==
=== Ground rent ===
In 2016, Taylor Wimpey was accused of selling houses and apartments as leasehold that would traditionally have been freehold, with clauses that allowed the ground rent to rise dramatically in later years, making the houses unsaleable. Taylor Wimpey also sold the freehold to other companies, which could then go on to charge exorbitant amounts (up to £40,000) for the freehold. On 19 March 2021, the Competition and Markets Authority ordered Taylor Wimpey to remove terms that double the ground rent of leasehold properties every 10 or 15 years. In December 2021, Taylor Wimpey formally committed to remove the terms from leasehold contracts and exclude them from new contracts; it would also pay third party freeholders of leases that Taylor Wimpey originally owned to enable their leaseholders to do the same. The CMA's chief executive Andrea Coscelli said Taylor Wimpey's action was "a huge step forward", describing the ground rent rises as "totally unwarranted obligations that lead to people being trapped in their homes, struggling to sell or obtain a mortgage". In August 2022, the CMA ruled that people who had to pay double ground rent would be refunded.

=== Opposition to government climate change targets on new homes ===
In 2021, Taylor Wimpey was among a 2% minority of respondents to government consultations on future homes standards, opposing plans to cut carbon dioxide emissions from new homes by 75% to 80% from 2025 and arguing against heat pumps (proposed as replacements for gas boilers). Greenpeace claimed Taylor Wimpey was trying to derail UK climate policy, which the company strongly denied, saying it was concerned about practical implementation of the cuts.

=== Hackney demolition ===
In 2022, after structural problems were discovered in the concrete frame of a new £48m residential scheme in Hackney Wick, east London, Taylor Wimpey opted to demolish the block prior to reconstruction of the building. After two years of construction work, nearby residents faced 22 weeks of demolition work; one said "we're now into our third year of incessant and unbearable noise without a single discussion with Taylor Wimpey or any attempts to help/support the residents whose quality of life they are ruining." Taylor Wimpey apologised to local residents.

=== Competition law ===
In February 2024, Taylor Wimpey was among eight UK house-builders targeted by the Competition and Markets Authority in an investigation into suspected breaches of competition law. The CMA said it had evidence that firms shared commercially sensitive information with competitors, influencing the build-out of sites and the prices of new homes. In January 2025, the CMA said it was conducting further investigations into the suspected anti-competitive conduct. In June 2025, the CMA investigation was extended to August 2025. In July 2025, the housebuilders offered to pay £100 million towards affordable housing programme as part of an agreement to reform practices on information sharing and to end the investigation without admitting any liability or wrongdoing. On 30 October 2025, the CMA confirmed its investigation had been dropped in return for a £100m payment towards affordable homes and other measures including the development of industry-wide guidance on information-sharing and agreements not to share certain types of information with other housebuilders.
