= Robert Noel =

Robert Noel may refer to:

- Robert Noel (officer of arms) (born 1962), officer of arms at the College of Arms in London
- Bob Noel (1925–1999), American equipment manager
- Robert Edward Noel (born c. 1942), American attorney convicted with his wife for involuntary manslaughter, see Marjorie Knoller and Robert Noel
- Robert Noel (businessman) (born 1964), chief executive of Land Securities Group plc
- Red Noel (1925–1997), Canadian football player
