= Bryant Homes =

British house builder

- Company type: Private company
- Industry: Housebuilding
- Founded: 1885
- Defunct: 2010
- Fate: Acquired
- Successor: Taylor Woodrow
- Headquarters: Solihull, United Kingdom
- Parent: Taylor Wimpey
- Website: www.bryant.co.uk

Bryant Homes was one of the larger UK housebuilders when it was acquired by Taylor Woodrow in 2001; Bryant then became the principal housebuilding operation of the enlarged group. Taylor Woodrow merged with Wimpey in 2007 and during 2010 the Bryant brand was phased out. The company was first listed on the London Stock Exchange in 1962.

== History ==
The company was founded by Chris Bryant in 1885 and initially traded in Birmingham as C. Bryant & Son. The founder's son, Eb, took over the business in 1928, assisted by the more experienced Frank Russon, who joined the Board at the same time. Bryant confined itself to local contracting until 1936 when the first speculative housing site was acquired. After World War II, the company built new council housing to replace the slums in Birmingham as well as undertaking civil engineering work there.

Bryant resumed private housing development in the early 1950s and in 1958 Roy Davies was appointed managing director of Bryant's housing subsidiary (then Bryant Estates). Davies was responsible for the expansion of Bryant into one of the largest housebuilders in the midlands.

The late 1970s brought problems for Bryant. Summonses for corruption were issued against the Company and certain directors in 1977 and losses were incurred in Saudi Arabia in 1978: "Let’s face it, 1978 has not been our year."

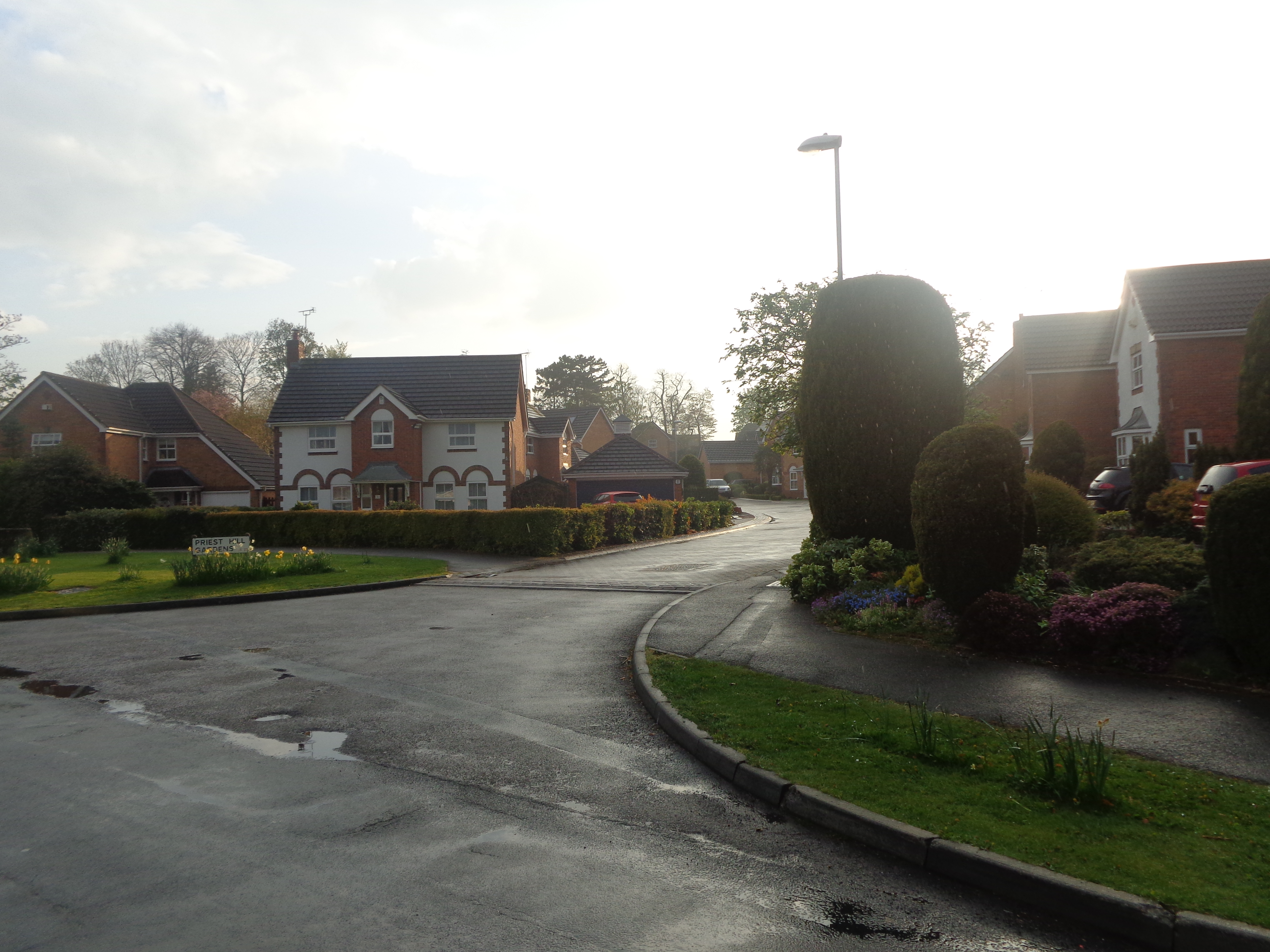
Bryant houses in Wetherby dating from the 1990s

Bryant had confined its housing to its midlands home territory until 1976 when it opened a small southern region, but it was not until the early 1990s that regional expansion began on a wider scale. By the end of the decade, Bryant was building over 4,000 houses a year on a national basis.

In January 2001, the company was acquired by Taylor Woodrow. In 2007, Taylor Woodrow merged with George Wimpey to form Taylor Wimpey.
