= Lord Currie =

Lord Currie may refer to:

- Philip Currie, 1st Baron Currie
- David Currie, Baron Currie of Marylebone
