= William Noel =

William Noel may refer to:

- William Noel (MP for Rutland) (1789–1859), British politician
- William Noel (1695–1762), English barrister, judge and politician, MP for Stamford, and for West Looe
- William G. Noel (1965-2024)
