= Marathon House =

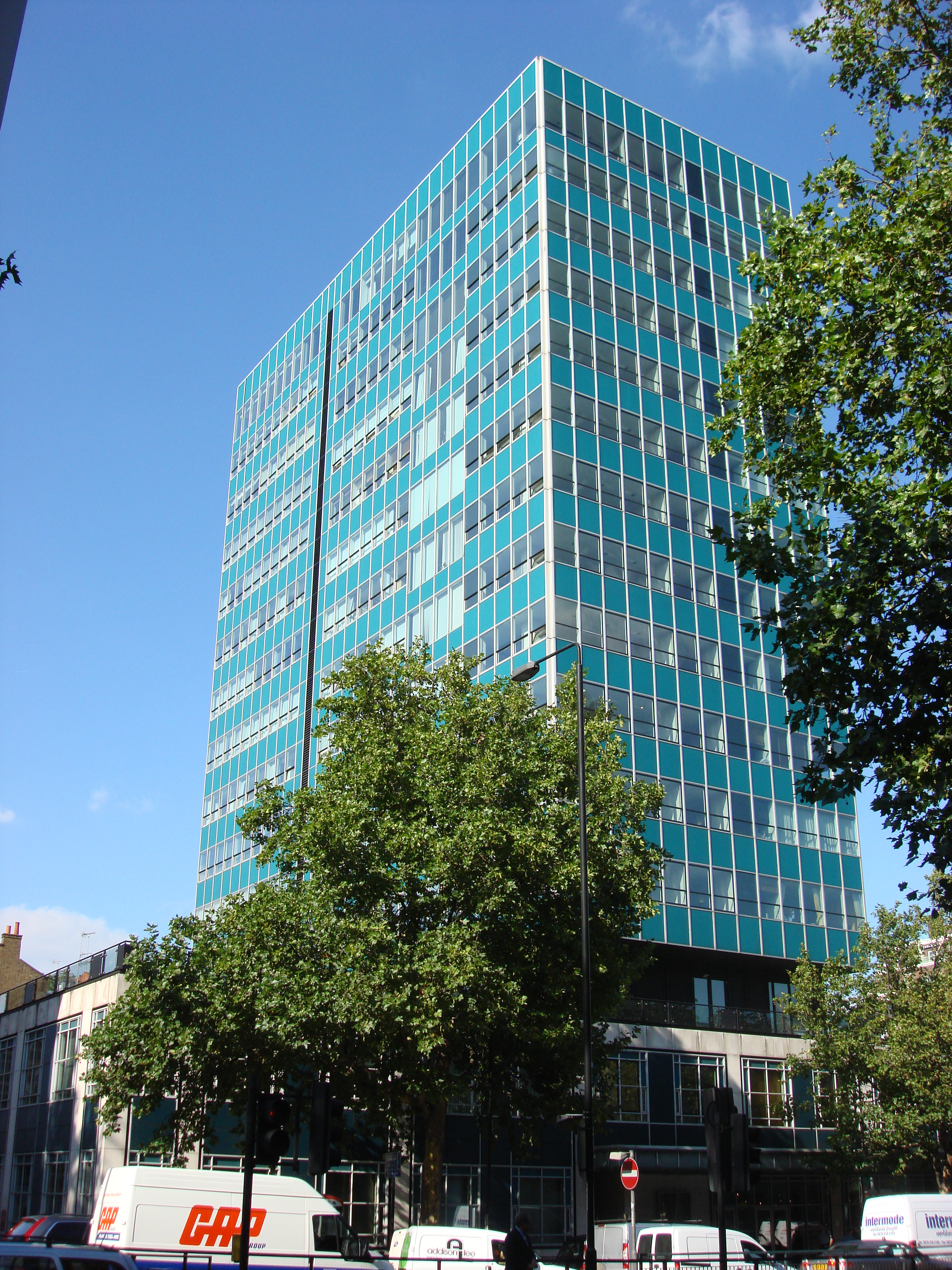
- View of Marathon House
- Interactive map of the Marathon House area

General information
- Status: Completed
- Type: Residential
- Location: 176-204 Marylebone Road, London Borough of Westminster, London NW1 5PW, NW1 5PL
- Coordinates: 51°31′21.69″N 0°09′39.41″W
- Construction started: 1957
- Completed: 1960
- Owner: Marathon House Freehold Company Ltd (freeholder)
- Operator: HML Hawksworth

Height
- Roof: 49.38 m (162.0 ft)
- Top floor: 14

Technical details
- Floor count: 15
- Floor area: 140,000 sq ft (13,000 m^{2}) GFA 100,239 sq ft (9,312.5 m^{2}) NIA
- Lifts/elevators: 4

Design and construction
- Architect: GMW
- Developer: Hammerson
- Structural engineer: W. V. Zinn Associates
- Main contractor: Sir Robert McAlpine and Sons

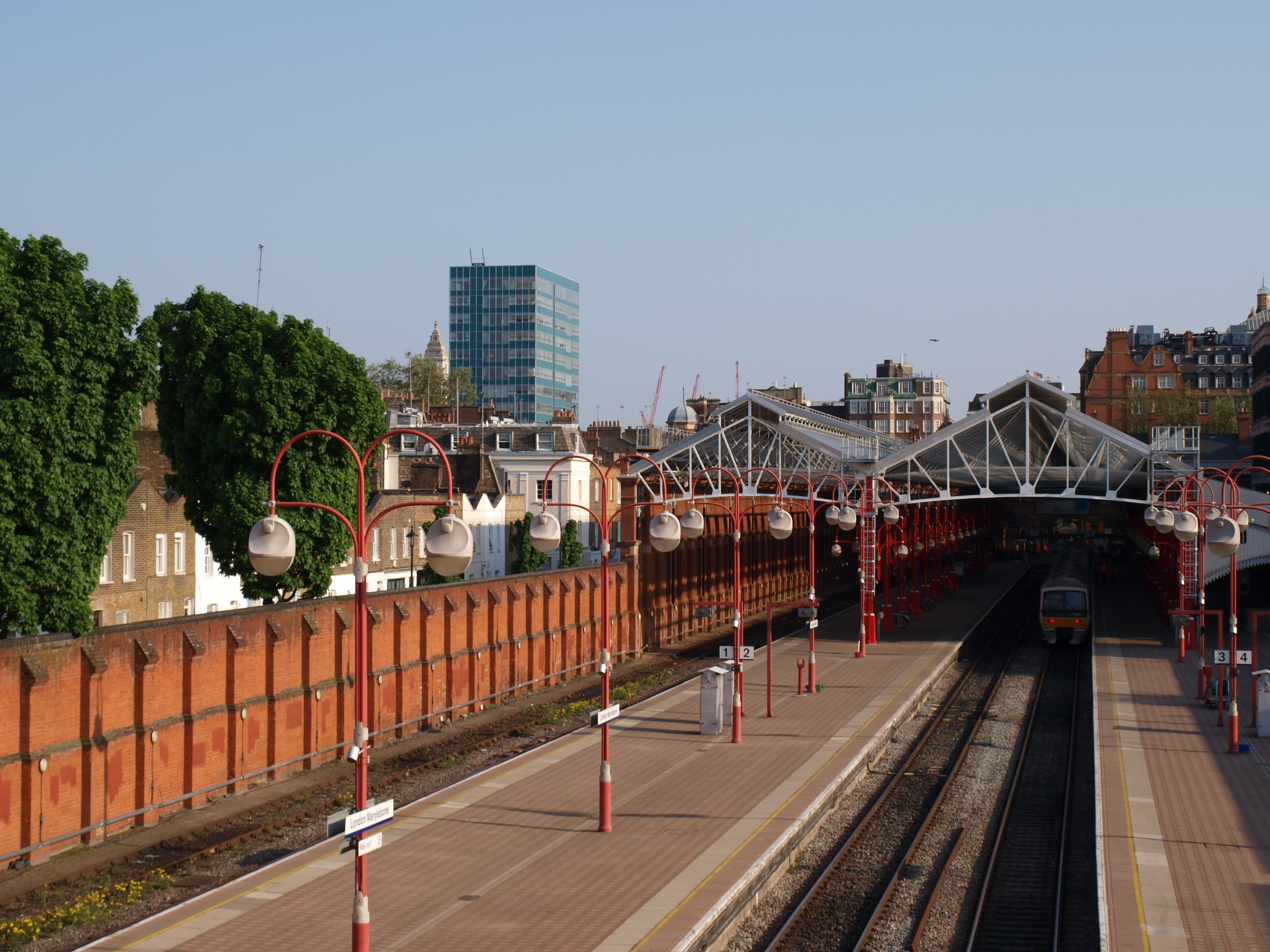
Marathon House behind Marylebone Station

Marathon House is a landmark building completed in 1960 (then Castrol House), it exhibited the first use of an American-style fully-glazed curtain wall in England. It is 162 feet (49 m) high and has 15 floors. The building was influenced by New York City's Lever House (1951-2).

== Description ==
The twenty years following the second world war saw an extraordinary period of reconstruction as bomb-damaged towns and cities were rebuilt and as new designs and construction techniques were adopted. Marathon House exemplified the trend, arriving on the cusp of sixties, with such modern conveniences as lighting without switches that responded to ambient light.

It represented a post-war reprise of the American invasion of London exemplified earlier by the construction using new steel frame techniques of Selfridges in Oxford Street (1908) but now with added vertical vigour as new towers sprung up in quick succession.

The architects, Gollins Melvin Ward and Partners, in association with Casson, Conder and Partners, originally designed a 22 storey high tower (52 ft x 110 ft in cross section), later reduced to 16 storeys, over a patio on a one-acre site at ground level. The Royal Fine Arts Commission, however, wanted a rectangular building parallel with Marylebone Road. The building was redesigned accordingly—the tower was reduced in height, an extra storey was added to the podium, and the public space at ground level in the original design was sacrificed. The smaller tower was, nevertheless, one of the first to break the 100 ft restriction of the then London County Council. The reduction in height was dictated by a need to prevent the building overshadowing the Marylebone Town Hall directly opposite, dating from 1914 to 1920.

It has been called the "daddy of slab and podium buildings in the country" but it was, in fact, preceded by Fountain House (1954–58) in Fenchurch Street—a drab, unattractive building with a partially-glazed curtain wall which was approved for demolition in 2014, and by Basil Spence's Thorn House in Upper St. Martin's Lane (1957–59; now renamed Orion House after a complete "facelift" in the 1990s which transformed its appearance). Town planner Walter Bor felt Castrol House and Thorn House 'enriched the townscape'; David Kynaston wrote of their arrival (in Modernity Britain, Book 2: A Shake of the Dice, p26) that "the march of the vertical was undeniable."

The architectural style is International Style of modern architecture,

or more specifically the Miesian school, whereby the structural and economic logic of the gridded steel or concrete frame was exploited to produce highly rationalized buildings, generally rectilinear, whether low or high, deep or shallow, whose external expression -- usually an elegant iteration of the glazed curtain wall -- was precisely the celebration of their own technology.

The "International" dimension derives from the habit of post-war architects to replicate designs:

Soon after Lever House was built in New York, replicas of it appear in all corners of the globe from Marylebone Road in London (Castrol House) to Atatürk Boulevard in Ankara. So the buildings become independent of place and of regional culture; often of course, such examples are totally inappropriate from a climatic point of view and the original technology is only indifferently emulated. Another characteristic is that many buildings at this end of the spectrum will proclaim their adherence to the International tradition quite literally by being independent of the site-lifted above it. The Villa Savoie at Poissy (1929/31) by Le Corbusier is the archetype here but the Maison Suisse (1930/32) or the Unite d'habitation (1947/52) are equally good examples.

In the case of Lever House air-conditioning was an important enabler of the style, but none was provided at Castrol House, "just radiant ceiling panel heating and natural ventilation by sliding windows which proved to be a poor substitute." The building must have been, like many others of its time, an uncomfortable place to work in summer (see e.g., People in Glass Houses, 1967). Today the building features a cooling system with dry coolers on the roof, chilling plant in the basement, and fan coil heat exchange units throughout the building.

Early photos of the building may be found on Royal Institute of British Architect's web site and that of the Courtauld Institute, with at least one in the Francis Frith collection. A gallery of contemporary photographs taken from different vantage points may be found at Marathon House.

Completed in 1959, the building was opened by Minister of Transport Ernest Marples on 22 February 1960. It wasn't universally well regarded:

Castrol House, on Marylebone Road, that British wannabe rip-off of Skidmore, Owings and Merrill's giant Lever House in New York, said entirely different corporate cool things to my schoolboy self in the 1960s. Completed in 1959, opened by Ernest Marples, Supermac's minister of transport, it was used endlessly in film and TV as a backdrop because there was so little glamorous new office building around. (The owners actually wanted to demolish it in the 1990s. Under threat of listing, they converted it into a block of flats, full of flight capital from God knows where. They also revised the glazing to the slab, with dinky little Edwardianate quarter-lights. Hardly worth bothering.)--The New Statesman

In contrast, John Grindrod, author of the widely praised retrospective Concretopia: A Journey Around the Rebuilding of Postwar Britain, has described it as "the best office building in London".

At night, the tower was illuminated internally through translucent green glass panels., via cold-cathode tubes, to create a spectacular effect—one considered "optically disturbing"! (sic) in Pevsner's Architectural Guide. Unfortunately, no photographs of this are readily available. The effect is more clearly described in Light and Lighting (1960 p. 63)

Exterior lighting, switched on every evening from half-an-hour before sunset to 11PM comprises a 4ft length of green cold-cathode tubing at the base of each spandrel panel of the tower. These panels are of green tinted glass and the lighting creates at night fourteen green bands of light around the building.

The building featured prominently, and supposedly located in Washington DC, in the 1960s ITV series Dangerman and in the films The Bank Job and The Young Ones. Rosamund Stacey, the protagonist of Margaret Drabble's 1965 "sixties feminist" novel The Millstone, lives in Castrol House, and says of it, en route to hospital by ambulance, that she was "glad to be going from so good an address" (p. 96).

The rear wall of the entrance hall featured a large opencast relief (15m long by 7m high) by British sculptor Geoffrey Clark, depicting the process of extracting and refining oil. It was cast in aluminium in sections on the floor of his barn in Stowe Hill. This commission followed one for an 18m tall metal sculpture for the original façade of Thorn House mentioned above (designated "The Spirit of Electricity" and incorporating allusions to electric lamp filaments), which, unlike that at Marathon House, has survived the redevelopment of the building (having been remounted onto an added lift and service riser).

During the conversion to residential use a service elevator at the north end of the tower was removed, as were lavatories on each floor of the tower, and one of three main elevator shafts was bricked in. A staircase to a mezzanine level in the lobby was removed, along with the double height foyer, and most of the mezzanine space was converted into an apartment—a late addition to the conversion plans for which the council was paid a further £9,000 toward social housing. Also lost was a spiral staircase from a VIP suite on the top floor, leading to a terrace on the roof; a cinema; two ground floor staff restaurants with seating capacity for 475 people; and a PBX room. In addition, a pneumatic postal chute system for delivering documents around the building! A roof-top window-washing gondola that moved about the parapet wall on tracks, like that of Lever House, was retained but is now used mainly for replacing windows.

== Architects ==
The GMW architectural practice is profiled in Architects and Architecture of London by Kenneth Allinson. Historic England's website describes the practice

Gollins, Melvin and Ward, still trading as GMW Architects, were established in London in 1947 by Frank Gollins, James Melvin and Edmund Ward. Their reputation was made with their award-winning entry for the competition for Sheffield University. While the practice maintained a sideline in public-sector work, it became renowned for commercial building and above all prestigious offices projects. James Stirling, briefly employed on the Sheffield project, described Gollins, Melvin and Ward as ‘the best of the safe, understandable moderns’. GMW pioneered the introduction of the American-style curtain wall office with Nos. 93-97 and 118-126 New Cavendish Street, 1953-56, now demolished, and Castrol House on Marylebone Road, an elegant tower and podium building of 1955-60, now re-clad. The Commercial Union Assurance/P & O development followed in 1963-69 (a Certificate of Immunity from Listing for the former was renewed in 2012 and the latter has been demolished). The three founding partners retired in 1974, leaving one of the largest practices in the UK and enjoying a particularly dominant presence in the City.

A former colleague quoted in Allinson's book (p. 381) says of the principals

Edmund [Ward] was the 'baby' and the 'design genius', eventually becoming a Royal Fine Arts Commissioner [...] He liked fast cars, beautiful women and his narrow gauge railway. James Melvin [...] was effectively the business brain and the office manager. [...] Gollins, by all accounts was the wheeler dealer who often brought jobs in.

A critique of their work (in Commercial, dead or alive, Architectural Design, August 1956, p. 243), even before the building was constructed, suggested

It is efficient, and it comes from an office that has set itself to be efficient, commercial and modern ... it can only be a matter of years before [buildings like Lever House] become commonplace. For they are not difficult to design they are the product of a system of exact thinking and meticulous detailing ... we should hail the appearance of the first completely anonymous piece of machine architecture to appear in London this century ... it is not pretending to be a palace, or a temple, or even to be a work of great architecture.

The building featured in City of Towers, a 1979 BBC TV critique of modern architecture and documentary by Christopher Booker on the impact of property developers on London, which he called 'the greatest disaster to befall post-war Britain' and The Spectator called "high-rise vandalism":

The case expressed in City of Towers was made as long ago as 1961 in a superb New Yorker article by Lewis Mumford. He wrote of London: 'Today that unique city is in danger of turning into a mass of undistinguished, if not uniform, high buildings, encircled and penetrated by ever wider lanes of motor traffic, where a constant surge of motor cars and lorries will wipe out the last traces of those human qualities that have been protected by the very intricacy or deviousness of London's old web of streets, alleys, mews and cul-de-sacs.'

Frank Gollins (1910-1999), James Melvin (1912-2012) and Edmund Ward (1912-1998) retired in 1974, leaving a portfolio of images and architectural designs to Sheffield Hallam University. Some may be found online in the images and multimedia library. The practice continued, and the building merits a page on its web site. In August 2015 the practice was taken over by Scott Brownrigg.

Melvin's home in South Kensington which he designed himself was also modernist in style and featured in the film Exhibition by Joanna Hogg (IMDB) dedicated to the architect. The house featured a copy of the spiral staircase now lost from Marathon House. (The Guardian describes how the film was made).

== Construction ==
The building was first proposed in 1955 at the beginning of 1955-64 property boom (The Property Masters by Peter Scott gives an account of new methods of finance that contributed to it). Construction, originally estimated to cost £2.2m, began in 1957, the tower was topped out in April 1959, the building was occupied in November 1959 and completed and formally opened in 1960. The consulting engineers were W. V. Zinn (structural) and Edward A. Pearce and Partners (mechanical and electrical). Quantity Surveyors were H. R. Heasman and Partners. Sir Robert McAlpine & Sons Ltd was the main contractor and the curtain wall (including glass and glazing) was undertaken by Williams and Williams Ltd. (Source: The Consulting Engineer. 1959. Vol. 16. p. 80).

The building featured the first use in the UK of a new technique of colouring glass by flowing a coloured resin over the glass, giving it a green hue later popular with airport control towers.

The 1998 conversion to residential property was designed by Leighton Carr and the development was undertaken by Berkeley Homes. The facade was specified by Cladtech Ltd. and constructed by the Dutch firm Schelderbouw BV, now part of Permasteelisa S.p.A. (Vittorio Veneto); Interpane Glas Industrie AG (Lauenförde) provided the glass. Electrical work was undertaken by Dennis Cox.

== History ==
The site, now given the postal address 200 Marylebone Road, was formerly occupied by houses numbered from 176 to 204. The building, originally constructed as a speculative investment by Lew Hammerson, was let before construction was finished to the Wakefield group by his cousins Cyril and Lionel Mendoza who ran a family estate agency business. It was home to a number of companies during its commercial history and changed its name (and street number and post code) several times, from Castrol House to Burmah Castrol House to Leyland House, and finally to Marathon House:

- Wakefield Castrol Group: 1960-1966
- Burmah Castrol: 1966-1973
- British Leyland: 1973-1979
- Marathon Oil: 1980-1998

The building opened as the new HQ of Wakefield Castrol Group, which was renamed to Castrol Ltd around the time the company moved in, beginning a long association with the oil and automotive industries. Castrol products were involved in helping

- Flight pioneers Alcock and Brown complete their first non-stop flight across the Atlantic
- Malcolm Campbell set a new World Land Speed record in 1925
- W. Handley become the first rider to win two Isle of Man TT races in one week

among other notable achievements.

Burmah bought Castrol in 1966; the group was renamed Burmah Castrol. (Burmah Castrol moved to Swindon and became part of BP Amoco plc, now BP plc, in 2000). In May 1973 British Leyland Motor Corporation took a 20-year lease on the recently vacated Burmah-Castrol House and renamed it "Leyland House". The move from the old Leyland Motor Corporation's cramped headquarters, distributed across several buildings in Berkeley Square, took place in September that year. However, when Michael Edwardes took over as chairman in 1977 he refused to work there, and off-loaded the building. In 1979, British Leyland reassigned the remainder of the lease to Marathon International Petroleum, effectively swapping headquarters with the oil company, and closed its offices in the building. Its new, slimmed-down base was in Portman Square, just down the road at the southern end of Gloucester Place.

Martin's Bank, since subsumed into Barclay's Bank, had a branch on the premises from 1962 to 1979. The earliest reference to Marathon Oil on site dates from 23 December 1980 (at a post code of NW1 5AT). It left in July 1998, after which the building was converted from office use to apartments by Berkeley Homes.

The design of the building was praised in a parliamentary debate in 1962. In 1994 the building was again mentioned in a debate in the House of Commons in a discussion of whether it was right (of English Heritage) to designate it as a listed building—it was contended that listing was a form of sequestration. The building was supposedly no longer suitable for modern offices—a proposal to redevelop the site with a 7-storey office building was submitted to Westminster Council in 1996 and was refused planning permission—or perhaps the desire to profit from redeveloping it as a residential building was then irresistible?

In an article entitled "MoMo's second chance: the revaluation of inner urban housing in Britain" John Allan says of the building that it

is, or rather was, a tolerably representative MoMo office complex on London's Marylebone Road designed by the British "Miesians" Gollins, Melvin and Ward

and goes on to note how its conversion to residential flats was because its value as an office building could not compete with its potential residential value as an apartment complex, and that by this means it was saved from outright demolition.

(MoMo is "Modern Movement"; see Docomomo International for more)

The building had stood empty for some time and efforts to let it had been unsuccessful. It compared unfavourably with more modern office accommodation that featured air-conditioning and sufficient space for cabling for office equipment. The owners, Hammerson, considered that for these reasons, and because the curtain wall was now beyond economic repair, having reached its anticipated life of 25 years, that the building was "no longer fit for purpose." It invited the Secretary of State to agree that listing the building (for preservation) would "sterilise" it, blighting the area. A number of alternative proposals for office buildings were rejected by Westminster Council, which stated "The existing building height should be viewed as a not to be exceeded maximum." (Council minutes of a meeting with GMW; 27 January 1994).

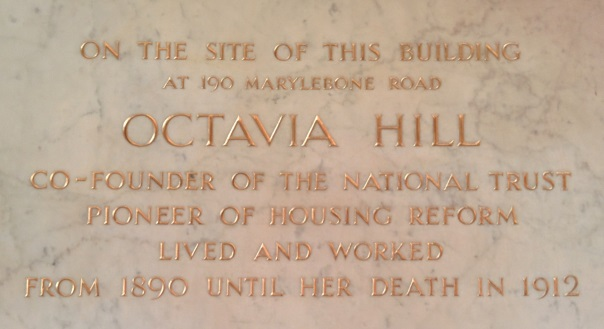
Octavia Hill plaque

In May 1996 Westminster City Council's action in the so-called homes for votes scandal were ruled illegal and subsequent approval of the conversion by Westminster Council's Planning Applications subcommittee required a financial contribution of £259,000 toward the council's budget for affordable housing (minutes 20/12/96 & 5/8/97).

The lobby, refurbished in 2019, contains a small plaque commemorating Octavia Hill, the social housing reformer and founder of the National Trust, who lived in a house formerly on the site of the building.

In 2012, following the acquisition of the right to manage (RTM), the leaseholder-controlled Marathon House RTM Company took over the management of the building from the landlord's appointed managing agent, Peverel/OM Ltd. The RTM Company is now responsible for the appointment of the managing agent. In June 2015 a group of leaseholders established the Marathon House Freehold Company and served notice of enfranchisement on the landlord. In February 2017, with the freehold enfranchisement case still pending, the landlord submitted proposals to Westminster Council to redevelop the building. These were recommended for refusal by the Planning Officer, principally on heritage grounds, after hundreds of objections were made by leaseholders, neighbours, local and national heritage organizations as well as several writers on modern architecture. The council's Planning Committee accepted the recommendations and confirmed the refusal of all applications on 8 August 2017. The landlord submitted an appeal in respect of one application to the Secretary of State on 19 October. Following a hearing by the Planning Inspectorate on the 31 May 2018 the landlord's proposal to redevelop the roof of the building was approved. Subsequently, in 2023, the landlord conceded that the value of this permission was nil and the Marathon House Freehold Company Ltd acquired the freehold on 8 August.

== Location ==
Marathon House is one of the most centrally located buildings in London (maps: wikimapia) with secure underground parking and two underground stations nearby—Marylebone and Baker Street tube stations are, respectively, about 2 and 5 minutes distance on foot (150m and 300m respectively). Edgware Road tube station is only a little further at 500m (Transport for London's Walking times between stations). Note: The Baker Street to Edgware Road underground line passes underneath the building; see: Live map of London Underground trains. Marathon House is just outside London's congestion charge zone, the perimeter of which passes in front of the building along Marylebone Road.

Regent's Park is a short walk. Oxford Street is a slightly longer walk or a short bus-ride down Baker Street. The building overlooks Dorset Square, the original home of the Marylebone Cricket Club (MCC), and Lord's cricket ground is a walkable distance, perhaps 20 minutes, away. The London Business School, adjacent to nearby Regent's Park, has leased and refurbished the former Westminster City Council building directly opposite Marathon House.

== In popular culture ==
Castrol House was used as the headquarters of the fictional Mogul oil company in the popular 1960s BBC TV drama The Troubleshooters (British TV series).
