= Irene Dorner =

American businesswoman (born 1954)

- Born: 5 December 1954 (age 71)
- Education: St Anne's College, Oxford
- Occupations: Businessperson and lawyer

Irene Mitchell Dorner (born 5 December 1954) was the former president, CEO and managing director of HSBC North America Holdings Inc. and HSBC USA. In 2014, she retired from her 32-year career at HSBC. A qualified barrister at law, during her career Dorner worked in a range of roles in the United Kingdom and internationally. She was the first woman CEO of HSBC, Malaysia.

As well as being chairman of Control Risks, she is a non-executive director of Rolls-Royce and AXA

== Education and career ==
Dorner attended Whitley Bay Grammar School and St Anne's College, Oxford where she received an MA in jurisprudence in 1976. She was called to the bar at Middle Temple in 1977. She is an Honorary Fellow of St Anne's College, Oxford.

Dorner began her career in 1982 as an in-house lawyer at the merchant banking arm of Midland Bank, which was later acquired by HSBC. At HSBC, she was also the chief operating officer of treasury and capital markets and general manager of marketing and human resources. In 2007, she was appointed deputy chairman and CEO HSBC Bank Malaysia Berhad. In 2011, Dorner was appointed to run the US operations of HSBC. At the helm of HSBC during 2013's money laundering scandal, she's said "One of the things that I am trying to get through to our entire bank is I would rather you walked away from a piece of business that has a question mark next to it than do it in order to boost your bottom line. I am looking for sustainability." Dorner retired from HSBC in 2014.

In 2012, she was named the Most Powerful Woman in Banking by American Banker. In 2013, she was named as one of the 25 Most Powerful Women On Wall Street by Business Insider.

While she is now a vocal advocate for advancing women in business and finance, she recognizes that this advocacy could have begun earlier. “I only realized what was happening when I was 50, because there I was, making my way in the unconscious rules,” Dorner said. “I really do think the next push has got to come from the senior middle-management women who must stand up and be counted on this earlier than I did.”

Dorner suffered from ovarian cancer, but after six months of chemotherapy and surgery she became cancer free in 2012.

She took over as chairwoman of Virgin Money UK on 31 March 2018. This appointment created the first all-female leadership team at a major British bank, with Jayne-Anne Gadhia acting as chief executive officer.

In July 2019, it was announced Dorner would succeed Kevin Beeston as non-executive chair of Taylor Wimpey from 26 February 2020. Dorner is to step down after the company's April 2023 AGM, and will be replaced by former Land Securities executive Robert Noel.
