= Telereal Trillium =

Property company in London, England

- Type: Private company
- Industry: Property, Investment
- Founded: 1997
- Headquarters: London, England
- Key people: Russell Gurnhill (CEO)
- Products: property management, Property investment, Property development
- Number of employees: 270 (2017)
- Parent: The majority ownership of TT Group is privately held by three funds settled under the Bernard Pears 1967 Family Trust. The minority ownership of TT Group is held by an Employee Benefit Trust.
- Website: www.ttg.co.uk

Telereal Trillium (now styled TT Group) is a commercial property investment, development and management company, headquartered in central London, England. The majority ownership of TT Group is privately held by three funds settled under the Bernard Pears 1967 Family Trust. The minority ownership of TT Group is held by an employee benefit trust.

== History ==
Trillium was formed in 1997 to acquire the 1,500,000 square metres (16,000,000 sq ft) property portfolio of the Department for Work and Pensions, which it did in 1998. Acquired by Land Securities in 2000, the company was renamed Land Securities Trillium.

In 2001, the 50/50 joint-venture company Telereal was established with William Pears Ltd, to acquire the property portfolio of British Telecom for £2.3Bn.

In 2002, Telereal began managing the property portfolios of O2 and Airwave. In 2004, Trillium signed property management agreements with Norwich Union and Barclays Bank. After Pears bought the remaining 50% interest in Telereal in 2005, the company completed the purchase of the property portfolio of the DVLA under a 20-year deal.

In 2008, Trillium signed deals to manage the property portfolios of the Royal Mail and Birmingham City Council. It then bought the project management division of AMEC, and then bought the office and branch properties of the Royal Bank of Scotland in partnership with the Prudential plc Investment Management.

In 2009, after selling Aviva's Norwich headquarters for £134 million, Land Securities sold Trillium (excluding the Accor Hotels portfolio), to Telereal for £750 million, to form Telereal Trillium. The group then sold its 10% stake in the £1.3 billion Trillium Investment Partners fund, which invested in public-private partnerships covering at that point 108 assets including University College Hospital, to existing investors in the fund, which then renamed itself Semperian.

In January 2010, the company placed the majority of the Royal Bank of Scotland assets it owned up for sale, for a sum of £475 million.

In 2015 the company acquired Lands Improvement Holdings from Blackrock.

In 2019, in 50:50 joint venture with Blackstone Property Partners, the company acquired £1.46bn of Network Rail's commercial estate, forming The Arch Company.
