= Danger Man =

British TV drama series, 1960–1968

- First series titles
- Genre: Spy; Action-adventure
- Created by: Ralph Smart
- Starring: Patrick McGoohan
- Music by: Edwin Astley
- Opening theme: "The Danger Man Theme" by Edwin Astley (S1); "High Wire" by Edwin Astley (S2-S4); "Secret Agent Man" by P. F. Sloan and Steve Barri (S2-S4, US only)
- Country of origin: United Kingdom
- Original language: English
- No. of series: 4
- No. of episodes: 86 (list of episodes)

Production
- Cinematography: Brendan J. Stafford
- Editor: Derek Chambers; David Hawkins; Peter Pitt
- Running time: 24–25 min. S1); 48–49 min. (S2-S4)
- Production company: Incorporated Television Company for ATV

Original release
- Network: ITV
- Release: 11 September 1960 – 12 January 1968

Danger Man (retitled Secret Agent in the United States for the revived series, and Destination Danger and John Drake in other overseas markets) is a British espionage television series that was broadcast between 1960 and 1962, and again between 1964 and 1968. It was created by Ralph Smart, who also wrote many of the scripts, and starred Patrick McGoohan as secret agent John Drake. The programme was produced by Lew Grade's ITC Entertainment, and aired in the United Kingdom on ITV.

== Series development ==
The idea for Danger Man originated with Ralph Smart, an associate of Lew Grade, head of ITC Entertainment. Grade was looking for formats that could be exported.

Ian Fleming was brought in to collaborate on series development, but left before development was complete. Like James Bond, the main character is a globetrotting spy who works at first for NATO, in series one, and then for the fictional British intelligence service M9 for the remainder of the show's run. Like Bond, Drake cleverly extricates himself from life-threatening situations, albeit with gadgetry which is less fantastic than Bond's, and introduces himself as "Drake... John Drake."

After McGoohan was cast, he also affected character development. A key difference from Bond traces to the family-oriented star's preferences: no firearms (with a few rare exceptions, such as episode 26, "The Journey Ends Halfway") and no outright seduction of female co-stars (although Drake did engage in low-key romance in a few episodes).

== Premise ==
The series revolves around the character of John Drake, a skilled and intelligent secret agent who takes on dangerous and complex assignments. From the series one voice-over:

Every government has its secret service branch: America, CIA; France, Deuxième Bureau; England, MI5. NATO also has its own. A messy job? Well, that's when they usually call on me, or someone like me. Oh yes -- my name is Drake. John Drake.

The line "NATO also has its own" is not always present.

The mention of the Deuxième Bureau as France's secret service branch in the 1960s was, however, incorrect. This organisation was no longer in existence, having been replaced by the SDECE at the end of World War II.

Drake's missions involve international espionage, dealing with threats to global security, which often require him to go undercover. Drake is known for his resourcefulness, intelligence, and ability to think his way out of difficult situations. Unlike many spy shows of that era, the show focused on the use of intellect, rather than violence, notably avoiding excessive violence and romantic entanglements.

== Programme overview ==
The first series of 39 episodes ran 24–25 minutes each and portrayed John Drake as working for a Washington, D.C.–based intelligence organisation, on behalf of the North Atlantic Treaty Organization (NATO), whose assignments frequently took him to Africa, Latin America, and the Far East. They were filmed in black and white.

For the second and third series which aired several years after the first, the episode's length was extended to 48–49 minutes and Drake underwent retconning. His nationality became British, and he was an agent working for a secret British government department, called M9 (analogous to Secret Intelligence Service), though his Mid-Atlantic accent persists for the first few episodes in production. These were also filmed in black and white.

Other than the largely nominal change of employer and nationality, Drake's mandate remains the same: "to undertake missions involving national and global security". In keeping with the episodic format of such series in the 1960s, there are no ongoing story arcs and there is no reference made to Drake's NATO adventures in the later M9 episodes.

=== Pilot episode ===
The pilot was written by Brian Clemens, who later co-produced The Avengers. In an interview Clemens said:

The pilot I wrote was called "View from the Villa" and it was set in Italy, but the production manager set the shoot on location in Portmeirion, which looked like Italy but which was much closer. And obviously the location stuck in Patrick McGoohan's mind, because that's where he shot his television series The Prisoner much later.

The second unit director on the pilot, according to Clemens:

... shot some location and background stuff and sent the dailies back to the editing room at Elstree. Ralph Smart looked at them, hated them, and called up the second unit director and said "Look, these are terrible, you'll never be a film director," and then he fired him. The name of the second unit director? John Schlesinger.

=== Cancellation and resurrection ===
When American financing for a second series failed to materialise, the programme was cancelled. The first series had aired in America each Wednesday, 8:30 to 9:00 pm (Eastern Standard Time), on CBS from 5 April to 13 September 1961. It was used by the network as a late-spring replacement for Wanted Dead or Alive, which had just wrapped its third and final series.

After a two-year hiatus, two things had changed; Danger Man had subsequently been resold all around the world, with repeat showings creating a public clamour for new ones. Also by this time, James Bond had become popular, as had ABC's The Avengers. Danger Man's creator, Ralph Smart, rethought the concept; the second series' (1964) episodes were 49 minutes long and had a new musical theme, Edwin Astley's "High Wire". Drake gained an English accent and did not clash with his bosses at first. The revived Danger Man was broadcast in the U.S. as Secret Agent, first shown as a CBS summer-replacement program. It had a new U.S.-only theme song, "Secret Agent Man", sung by Johnny Rivers, which became a success in its own right. In other parts of the world, the show was titled Destination Danger or John Drake.

The fourth series consists of only two episodes, "Koroshi" and "Shinda Shima", the only two episodes of Danger Man to be filmed in colour. These two separate but related episodes were recut together as a feature for cinemas in Europe and for American broadcast, as done with two-parters from other ITC series such as The Baron and The Saint. Whilst "Koroshi" retains a strong plot-line and sharp characterisations, "Shinda Shima" drew heavily on contemporary Bond movies, principally Dr. No. When the episodes were completed, McGoohan announced he was resigning from the series to create, produce, and star in a project titled The Prisoner, with David Tomblin as co-producer and George Markstein as script editor. Markstein was then the Danger Man script consultant. A number of behind-the-scenes personnel on Danger Man were subsequently hired for The Prisoner.

The two colour episodes aired (in black and white) in the UK in the time slot of The Prisoner, which could not make its scheduled broadcast dates. The European cinema film feature version, Koroshi, did not receive theatrical release in the US, but instead aired on network television as a TV movie in 1968.

=== Character of "Drake" ===
Unlike the James Bond films, Danger Man strove for realism, dramatising credible Cold War tensions. In the second series, Drake is an undercover agent of a British intelligence agency. As in the earlier series, Drake finds himself in danger with not always happy outcomes; sometimes duty forces him to decisions that lead to good people suffering unfair consequences. Drake doesn't always do what his superiors tell him.

Drake is rarely armed, though he engaged in fist fights, and the gadgets he uses are generally credible. In one episode ("To Our Best Friend"), Drake says, "I never carry a gun. They're noisy, and they hurt people. Besides, I manage very well without." Although the villains are often killed, Drake himself rarely does the killing. An examination of all episodes indicates that, in the entire series, he only shoots one person dead, in one of the last half-hour episodes from the 1960 season. While another shooting occurs in "The Ubiquitous Mr. Lovegrove", it is revealed to be a dream. Drake is almost never shown armed with a gun, and the episode "Time to Kill" centres on Drake's hesitancy and initial refusal to take an assassination mission. (Events prevent Drake from having to carry out the task). In Episode 53 "Such Men Are Dangerous," Drake shoots and wounds a shotgun-armed villainess with a captured pistol. Drake's uses of non-firearm deadly force during the series number fewer than a dozen.

Despite the lack of firearm violence, The Encyclopedia of 20th-Century American Television by Ron Lackmann inexplicably describes Danger Man as one of the most violent series ever produced.

Drake uses his intelligence, charm and quick thinking rather than force. He usually plays a role to infiltrate a situation, for example, scout for a travel agency, naive soldier, embittered ex-convict, brainless playboy, imperious physician, opportunistic journalist, bumbling tourist, cold-blooded mercenary, bland diplomat, smarmy pop disc-jockey, precise clerk, compulsive gambler or impeccable butler.

Drake is often shown re-using gadgets from previous episodes. Among the more frequently seen are a small spy camera hidden in a cigarette lighter and activated by flicking the lighter, a miniature reel-to-reel tape recorder hidden inside the head of an electric shaver or a pack of cigarettes, and a microphone, which could be embedded in a wall near the target via a shotgun-like apparatus, that used soda siphon cartridges containing CO_{2} as the propellant, allowing Drake to eavesdrop on conversations from a safe distance.

As Drake gets involved in a case, things are rarely as they seem. He is not infallible—he gets arrested, he makes mistakes, equipment fails, careful plans do not work; Drake often has to improvise an alternative plan. Sometimes investigation fails and he simply does something provocative to crack open the case. People he trusts can turn out to be untrustworthy or incompetent; he finds unexpected allies.

John Drake, unlike Bond, never romanced any of the series' female characters, as McGoohan was determined to create a family-friendly show. McGoohan denounced the sexual promiscuity of James Bond and The Saint, roles he had rejected, although he had played romantic roles before Danger Man. Drake uses his immense charm in his undercover work, and women are often very attracted to him, but the viewers are left to assume whatever they want about Drake's personal life. The only exceptions to this rule were the two "linked" episodes of the series, "You're Not in Any Trouble, Are You?" and "Are You Going to be More Permanent?", in which Drake encounters two different women—both played by Susan Hampshire—and which contain numerous similarities in dialogue and set-pieces and both end with Drake in a pseudo-romantic circumstance with Hampshire's character. Drake is also shown falling for the female lead in the episode "The Black Book" though nothing comes of it; this episode is also one of the few scripts to directly address Drake's loneliness in his chosen profession. Many times the women in the show turned out to be femmes fatales, and heavily involved in the very plots Drake is fighting.

=== Co-stars and guest stars ===
In the second series, Drake displays an increasingly resentful attitude towards his superiors at M9, first answering unwillingly to "Gorton" (Raymond Adamson) and later to "The Admiral" or Hobbs (Peter Madden). In the series, "Hardy" was played by Richard Wattis.

Guest stars included Donald Pleasence, Howard Marion Crawford, Charles Gray, Donald Houston, Maurice Denham, Joan Greenwood, John Le Mesurier, Sylvia Syms, Paul Eddington, William Marshall, Patsy Ann Noble, Lois Maxwell, Burt Kwouk, and Peter Sallis.

== Production ==
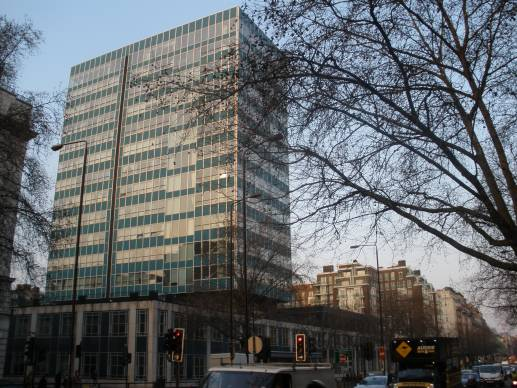
Marathon House 2011

Much of the series was shot at MGM-British Studios in Borehamwood. The Washington title sequence of the first series 24-minute episodes is a composite of the United States Capitol in the background and the Castrol Building, complete with a London Bus stop, in the Marylebone Road, London as the foreground. This building is now Marathon House, converted from offices to flats in 1998. In reality, no such building is allowed to exist in Washington, D.C., as the Height of Buildings Act of 1910 limits the heights of building to 130 feet (40 m).

== Music ==
=== Theme ===
- Series 1 "The Danger Man Theme", composed by Edwin Astley
- Series 2–4 "High Wire", composed by Edwin Astley
- Series 2–4 in the US as Secret Agent, "Secret Agent Man", theme composed by P. F. Sloan and Steve Barri, and recorded by Johnny Rivers.
- Incidental music throughout all four series by Edwin Astley
- Series 3 episode 23 "Not So Jolly Roger" concerned a pirate radio station that was run by spies passing on secrets. Prominently featured was "He Who Rides A Tiger" (Trevor Peacock / Gordon Waine), performed by Patsy Ann Noble; Noble herself appeared in the episode as a disc jockey on the pirate radio station which was broadcasting from an abandoned Maunsell Fort. The episode was filmed when pirate station Radio 390 was occupying the fort. "Not So Jolly Roger" also featured songs composed and performed by Rick Minus.

The second Danger Man theme, "High Wire," developed during series 2–4. The original version features a subdued rhythm section with almost inaudible drums. This was replaced with a revised version with drums and bass pushed to the fore in the mix. The end credits theme tune was set to end in the same manner as the opening theme, ending on the held, questioning, lower "E". The two-note coda was added soon afterwards to make a definite ending. An audio clip from the recording session can be heard as an extra on the final disc of the DVD set from Network DVD. The revised theme featured this as a normal end to the tune. As series 4 was to be made in colour, a completely new arrangement was recorded which owed much to the arrangement on Astley's full-length version of "High Wire" (released on single the previous year – see below). The feature film Koroshi was created from the only two episodes made for series 4, "Koroshi" and "Shinda Shima", and uses this new arrangement over the closing titles only.

When the show was picked up in America, Johnny Rivers recalled,

"We were approached by the producers of a television show called Danger Man, starring Patrick McGoohan. It was huge in Europe, but hadn't been brought over to North America yet. They only had an instrumental theme song with a harpsichord, and asked if we would be interested in putting together a little theme song for the American version. So when we were back stateside [from Europe], I got together with P.F. Sloan and Steve Barri, whom I had been working with and recording some of their songs, and we came up with something. I just stole that opening [guitar] riff from The James Bond Theme, and they wrote the lyrics and melody. Then we went in and recorded it for the show – just a verse and chorus with the little instrumental part. People started calling the radio stations, and the stations started calling the record companies saying, "You've got to put that out, it's a big hit." So we had to go back in and record it again with more lyrics, and that became the song that eventually became the hit.

=== Singles ===
- 1961 – "Theme from Danger Man", The Red Price Combo (main theme used in the 1st Series) – Parlophone 45 R 4789
- 1964 – Danger Man "High Wire", The Bob Leaper Orchestra (alternative main theme, not used in any episodes. Features electric piano) – PYE 7N 15700
- 1965 – Danger Man "High Wire", The Edwin Astley Orchestra (not used in series, arrangement influenced series 4 theme arrangement) – RCA 1492
- 1965 – Danger Man "High Wire", The Ivor Slaney Orchestra (alternative arrangement, not used in any episodes) – His Master's Voice POP 1347

=== Programme ID ===
The original opening ID changed as the series progressed. The first series had McGoohan leaving a building and getting into a convertible under the opening narration reproduced earlier, and driving off.

The earlier of the two sequences for the hour-long series features a photograph of a benevolently smiling McGoohan that zooms partly out towards the right of the frame, then stops, adding the legend "Patrick McGoohan as". The three-ringed 'target' revolves round in time to the three-note orchestra hits to obscure McGoohan's photo as it reveals the programme logo on a pure black background.

The second version was in two segments. The first segment is filmed, comprising a full-length McGoohan in stark negative, menacingly taking a few paces towards the camera, before he then stops. In quick succession, the camera zooms in fast onto his eyes, freeze-frames, then switches from negative to positive. The legend "Patrick McGoohan as" is added. This then switches to a different photo with McGoohan looking left out of picture. The familiar three-ringed 'target' then reveals the programme logo on a pure black background as before. The music was re-recorded for this version of the ident and lasted for the rest of the programme's run.

== Transition to The Prisoner ==
McGoohan resigned from the series, forcing its cancellation. He had been working on a new project entitled The Prisoner, with David Tomblin as co-producer and George Markstein as script editor. Markstein was then the Danger Man script consultant. A number of behind-the-scenes personnel on Danger Man were subsequently hired for The Prisoner. An unused, fourth-series script was reworked as an episode of The Champions.

Inspiration for The Prisoner came from a Danger Man episode called "Colony Three"^{[says who?]}, in which Drake infiltrates a spy school in Eastern Europe during the Cold War. The school, in the middle of nowhere, is set up to look like a normal English town in which pupils and instructors mix as in any other normal city, but the instructors are virtual prisoners with little hope of ever leaving. It is often thought this episode was a precursor to The Prisoner; it was filmed in the new town of Hatfield, Hertfordshire. The actor Derren Nesbitt (as a Number Two in The Prisoner) who appears in the episode "Time to Kill", Peter Swanwick (as supervisor in The Prisoner) in the episodes "The Key" and "The Paper Chase"; and the actor Richard Wattis who played Drake's superior Mr.Hardy (Mr. Fotheringay in The Prisoner) are later members of the cast in The Prisoner and many others.

Prisoner fans frequently debate whether John Drake of Danger Man and Number Six in The Prisoner are the same person. Like John Drake, Number Six is evidently a secret agent, but one who has resigned from his job.

According to The Prisoner: The Official Companion by Robert Fairclough, the Prisoner episode "The Girl Who Was Death" was based upon a two-part Danger Man script that had been planned for the fourth series. In this surreal episode, Number Six meets "Potter", John Drake's Danger Man contact. Christopher Benjamin portrayed the character in both series, with the episode also featuring an actor named John Drake in a small, non-speaking role. As well as guest-starring in this show, Paul Eddington played another spy and No.6's former colleague, Cobb, in the opening episode of the Prisoner.

The first Danger Man season includes four episodes which use footage filmed in the Welsh resort of Portmeirion, which later became the primary shooting location of the Village in The Prisoner.

Reference books disagree on whether The Prisoner was a Danger Man continuation. Vincent Terrace's The Complete Encyclopedia of Television Programs 1947–1979 postulates that John Drake's resignation reason is revealed in the "Do Not Forsake Me Oh My Darling" episode, which is a follow-up to a mission assigned to Number Six before he was sent to The Village. Richard Meyers makes the same claim in his 1981 book, TV Detectives. He further states that this connects directly to "an episode of Secret Agent never shown in [the United States] with John Drake investigating the story of a brain transferral device in Europe", but no such episode of Danger Man was ever made. And, indeed, he might have been confusing that plot device with the one from the "Who's Who?" episode of the contemporaneous spy-fi show The Avengers. Nigel Stock (who played "The Colonel" in "Do Not Forsake Me...") also guest-starred in the Danger Man episode "A Little Loyalty Always Pays", as Major Bert Barrington.

McGoohan stated in a 1985 interview that the two characters were not the same, and that he had originally wanted a different actor to play the role of Number Six. Nevertheless, Patrick McGoohan didn't change his look very much between the two series (see the episode “The Paper Chase” in Danger Man).

== Home releases ==
All four series are now available on DVD in Europe, Australasia and North America.

In Britain, Network DVD released a 13-disc "Special Edition" boxed set of the one-hour shows in June 2007. Extra features include the edited-together movie version of "Koroshi" and "Shinda Shima", the US Secret Agent opening and closing titles, image galleries for each episode, and a specially written 170-page book on the making of the one-hour series. Umbrella Entertainment has released the 24-minute series on DVD in Australia; the 49-minute series has been released by Madman.

Network Distributing Ltd Home Entertainment released the 1st (24 min) series in January 2010 on a 6-disc set with a commemorative booklet by Andrew Pixley.

In North America, the three series of hour-long episodes of the series were released by A&E Home Video, under licence from Carlton International Media Limited, under the title Secret Agent AKA Danger Man in order to acknowledge the American broadcast and syndication title. The episodes were digitally remastered from 35MM film prints and were presented in their original UK broadcast format and original CBS broadcast order; the two episodes that constituted the aborted fourth season were also included, the first time they had been released in their original format (however, this meant the transition scene filmed for the Koroshi feature-length version is omitted). The episodes retain their original Danger Man opening credits (including the original theme by the Edwin Astley Orchestra), the first time these have been seen in the U.S., with the Secret Agent credits included as an extra feature.

A&E Home Entertainment later released the first season of the original UK Danger Man on Region 1 DVD, newly restored and remastered, unedited, uncut and presented in its original UK broadcast format and order.

A&E subsequently released a single-set "megabox" containing all of the one-hour episodes; a revised megabox, released in 2007, added the half-hour episodes, and was released again in a modified slimline package in 2010. To date, no North American DVD release has occurred of the Koroshi TV movie edit of the two fourth-season episodes.

On 9 December 2014, Timeless Media Group re-released the entire series on DVD in Region 1 in a 17-disc set entitled Secret Agent (Danger Man)- The Complete Series.

As of October 2020, Danger Man is streaming on Amazon and Roku. As of February 2022, it's also shown on Tubi.

== Original novels and comic books ==
First issue of the Gold Key Comics series.

Several original novels based upon Danger Man were published in the UK and US, the majority during 1965 and 1966.

- Target for Tonight – Richard Telfair, 1962 (published in US only)
- Departure Deferred – W. Howard Baker, 1965
- Storm Over Rockall – W. Howard Baker, 1965
- Hell for Tomorrow – Peter Leslie, 1965
- The Exterminator – W.A. Balinger [W. Howard Baker], 1966
- No Way Out – Wilfred McNeilly, 1966

Several of the above novels were translated into French and published in France, where the series was known as Destination Danger. An additional Destination Danger novel by John Long was published in French and not printed in the US or UK. At least one of the novels, The Exterminator, was later republished in the 1970s by Zenith Publications in the UK, with no direct reference to Danger Man on the cover.

The adventures of John Drake have also been depicted in comic book form. In 1961, Dell Comics in the US (whose book-publishing cousin issued the Telfair novel) published a one-shot Danger Man comic as part of its long-running Four Color series, based upon the first series format. It depicted Drake as having red hair, a trait shared with Patrick McGoohan, but which was unseen as Danger Man had been made only in monochrome at that time. In 1966, Gold Key Comics published two issues of a Secret Agent comic book based upon the hour-long series. This series should not be confused with Secret Agent, an unrelated comic book series published by Charlton Comics in 1967, formerly titled Sarge Steel. In Britain, a single Danger Man comic book subtitled "Trouble in Turkey" appeared in the mid-1960s and a number of comic strip adventures appeared in hardback annuals. French publishers also produced several issues of a Destination Danger comic book in the 1960s, although their Drake was blond. Spanish publishers produced a series titled Agent Secreto. The Germans were particularly prolific, using 'John Drake' and a picture of McGoohan, as the cover for hundreds of "krimi" magazines.

== Broadcasters ==
=== Australia ===
The Australian rights are held by the Nine Network who, over many decades, have shown numerous repeats in non-peak viewing times. From 2012 to 2017 there were numerous showings in the early hours of the morning on Gem, a Nine Network digital outlet, sometimes twice per morning. The Danger Man repeats alternate with re-screenings of other British series such as Gideon's Way, The Baron, and The Avengers.

=== North American ===
CBS broadcast some of the original format's episodes of the programme in 1961 under the Danger Man title as a summer replacement for the Western series Wanted: Dead or Alive.

Danger Man was rebroadcast on American TV in the 2000s, when STARZ!'s Mystery channel started broadcasting the one-hour episodes in its American CBS broadcast version under the Secret Agent title. Prior to this, Secret Agent was widely seen in syndication. The half-hour Danger Man episodes were not as widely distributed.

In September 2018, Charge! began airing the series in its original UK format beginning with the second season.

In Canada, the series was broadcast under its original title, Danger Man.

== In popular culture ==
- The band Tears for Fears refer to the character in their song "Swords and Knives", and Dead Can Dance titled one of the songs on their Into the Labyrinth album "The Ubiquitous Mr. Lovegrove" after a Danger Man episode, although the content of the song has no apparent relationship to the episode. Australian band v.Spy v.Spy recorded a version of the "Danger Man" theme on their 1986 debut album "Harrys Reasons?"
- The British animated series Danger Mouse was largely inspired by Danger Man and is a broad parody of both this series and secret agent films and television in general.
- In episode "No Marks for Servility" (season 2, episode 9, #48, broadcast 8 December 1964), Drake, who is posing as a proper English butler, rescues a kidnapping victim while wearing a bowler hat and trench coat, and carrying a rolled-up umbrella, much as John Steed did on The Avengers. Brian Clemens, who had produced The Avengers, was also involved with Danger Man.
