= Kensington Town Hall, London =

Municipal building in London, England

Kensington Town Hall
- Kensington and Chelsea Town Hall

- Location within Royal Borough of Kensington and Chelsea

General information
- Architectural style: Brutalist style
- Location: Kensington, London
- Coordinates: 51.50202°N 0.19515°W
- Completed: 1976
- Inaugurated: 1977

Design and construction
- Architect: Sir Basil Spence
- Main contractor: Taylor Woodrow Construction

Kensington Town Hall is a municipal building in Hornton Street, Kensington, London. Opened in May 1977, it is the headquarters of Kensington and Chelsea London Borough Council. It is just near High Street Kensington station.

== History ==
=== Construction and opening ===
The building was commissioned to replace the old town halls of Kensington and Chelsea following the amalgamation of the two boroughs to form the Royal Borough of Kensington and Chelsea in 1965. After both the old town halls had been rejected as inadequate for the council's needs, civic leaders decided to procure a new facility; the site selected for new building in Hornton Street had previously been occupied by two large residential properties: Niddry Lodge and the Red House. (Note: Niddry Lodge, built in 1831, had been the home of General Sir John Fraser until 1843, the home of the Dowager Countess of Hopetoun until 1854 and then the home of John Francis Campbell until 1885. Meanwhile, the Red House, built in 1835, had been the home of President Herbert Hoover from 1914 to 1917.) In 1967, a giant redwood tree was planted in what would later be the inner courtyard by Baroness Churchill in memory of her husband, Sir Winston Churchill.

The construction work, which was undertaken by Taylor Woodrow Construction at a cost of £11.6 million, started in 1972. The architect, Sir Basil Spence, who had been commissioned to design the building in the Brutalist style, died just 10 days before the building was completed on 29 November 1976. The building was officially opened by Princess Anne on 31 May 1977.

=== Operation ===
An ornamental pool which had been created beneath the council chamber was converted into a small garden planted in memory of Princess Alice, Countess of Athlone and was opened by the Duke of Gloucester on 4 May 1983.

At around 4:35 pm on 16 June 2017, following the Grenfell Tower fire, hundreds of demonstrators, some of whom had lost friends and family in the fire, entered the building in protest and chanted "we want an inquest" and "we want justice". A disturbance broke out when police attempted to escort council staff out, though there were no arrests and police and security escorted the protestors out of the building "after a short period of time". Singer Lily Allen attended the protest.

== Architecture and design ==
The design for the facility, which makes extensive use of red brick, includes a large square building to the north to accommodate council officers and their departments on an open plan basis, as well as a civic suite at the southern end and two octagonal buildings to the south, the western building being a public hall and the eastern building (raised up on concrete columns) being the council chamber. The main square building contains an inner courtyard which preserves several trees, including the giant redwood which architects chose to build around. The design for the main frontage on Hornton Street features glass doors on the left of that elevation which give access to the civic suite on the ground floor; there are tall oriel windows on the first floor which are cantilevered over the pavement.

Works of art in the mayor's parlour include a portrait of the collector Sir Hans Sloane, by Thomas Murray.
