= David Currie, Baron Currie of Marylebone =

British economist

The Right Honourable The Lord Currie of Marylebone
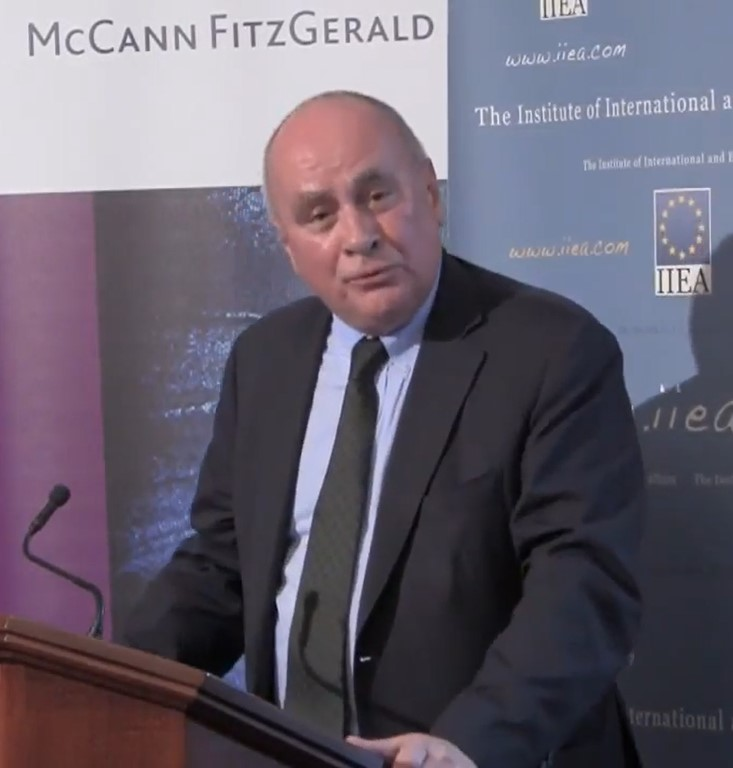

Chairman of the Competition and Markets Authority
- In office 2012–2018
- Prime Minister: David Cameron; Theresa May
- Business Sec.: Vince Cable; Sajid Javid; Greg Clark
- Preceded by: Organisation created
- Succeeded by: The Lord Tyrie

Chairman of the Office of Communications
- In office 2002–2009
- Prime Minister: Tony Blair; Gordon Brown
- Culture Sec.: Tessa Jowell; James Purnell; Andy Burnham; Ben Bradshaw
- Preceded by: Organisation created
- Succeeded by: Dame Colette Bowe

Member of the House of Lords
- Lord Temporal
- Life peerage 1 October 1996

Personal details
- Born: 9 December 1946 (age 79) Streatham, London, England
- Occupation: House of Lords cross-bencher Economist

David Anthony Currie, Baron Currie of Marylebone (born 9 December 1946) is a British economist specialising in regulation, and a cross-bench member of the House of Lords. Currie was the inaugural Chairman of the Competition and Markets Authority (CMA).

== Education and career ==
Currie was born in Streatham, south London, and attended Battersea Grammar School. He obtained a first class degree in mathematics at Manchester University and a master's degree in National Economic Planning at Birmingham University, after which he obtained a post as an economist with Hoare Govett. He took a position in 1972 as a lecturer at Queen Mary College, University of London, and progressed to an appointment as Professor of Economics. After that he spent 12 years at the London Business School, and was appointed as Professor of Economics in 1988.

In 1992, Currie became one of the 'six wise men' advising the Conservative Government's Treasury Department on economic matters as a member of the Treasury's Panel of Independent Forecasters, where he remained for three years. Currie was a director and the Chairman of the executive committee of the pressure group Charter88 from 1993 to 1997. On 1 October 1996 he was made a life peer and sits as a cross-bench member of the House of Lords. His title was gazetted Baron Currie of Marylebone, of Marylebone in the City of Westminster.

=== Cass Business School ===
In 2001, Currie was appointed Dean of the City University's business school. He secured a donation from the Sir John Cass Foundation and the following year the school changed its name to the Sir John Cass Business School, moved to larger premises, invested in new facilities and recruited academic staff to provide the new expanded programmes.

=== Ofcom ===
In July 2002 the Culture Secretary, Tessa Jowell, appointed Currie to be the first Chairman of the newly created Office of Communications, Ofcom, which combined the responsibilities of five different previously existing regulators:

- the Broadcasting Standards Commission,
- the Independent Television Commission,
- the Office of Telecommunications (Oftel),
- the Radio Authority, and
- the Radiocommunications Agency.

Currie compared regulators to drains: "If you notice them, then there is a problem".

Jowell renewed his appointment in 2007 for a further two years. Currie's achievements during his chairmanship include the telecoms strategic review which led to the rapid unbundling of BT phone lines and using the open market to allocate spectrum via auctioning. In October 2004, when delivering the Fleming Memorial Lecture to the Royal Television Society, Currie warned UK broadcasters they faced a "volcanic eruption" of new technology which would bring "with it an unprecedented challenge for traditional linear television broadcasting". In 2009 Currie's extended term came to an end, and he was succeeded by Colette Bowe.

=== Other roles ===
Currie was a member of the board of the Gas and Electricity Markets Authority from 2000 until 2002. Currie has served as a Director of the Dubai Financial Services Authority since 2004. In 2011, he published a report into reforms of certain aspects of procurement of equipment for the UK's Ministry of Defence. His proposals were supported in a white paper, Better Defence Acquisition, published in June 2013, and were used as the basis for Part 2 of the Defence Reform Act 2014. Following the News International phone hacking scandal, Currie was appointed on 20 July 2011 to the advisory panel of the Leveson Inquiry into the culture, practices and ethics of the British press. Currie has formerly served on the boards of Abbey National (2001–2002), BDO International (2008–2012), Royal Mail (2009–2012), IG Group (2010–2012), and as Chairman of Semperian (2008–2012), as well as the London Philharmonic Orchestra (2007–2012) and the Joseph Rowntree Reform Trust (1989–2002).

Currie is currently a Board member of the Institute for Government, and the Chair of Council of the University of Essex.

=== Competition and Markets Authority ===
In July 2012 Currie was appointed as chairman-designate of the Competition and Markets Authority (CMA). which began operation on 1 April 2014. He set out his concept for the Authority in a lecture to the Law Society in November 2012. He stepped down from all of his UK-based commercial directorships in 2012 to avoid conflicts of interest, taking a yearly salary from the CMA of between £180,000 and £184,999, making him one of the 328 most highly paid people in the British public sector as of September 2015.

== Honours ==
Currie was made an honorary fellow of Queen Mary University of London in 1997, and awarded an honorary DLitt by the University of Glasgow in 1998, an honorary DSc by City University in 2012, and an honorary doctorate from University of Essex in 2014.

== Publications ==
Currie has been author, joint author or editor of several publications on economic policies and systems:

- Currie (editor) (1985). Advances in Monetary Economics. London: Dover, N.H. : Croom Helm. ISBN 0709934432.
- Goodhart, Currie and LLewellyn (1987). The Operation and Regulation of Financial Markets. Macmillan.
- Currie and Vines (1988). Macroeconomic Interactions between North and South. Cambridge University Press.
- Currie and Levine (1993). Rules, Reputation and Macroeconomic Policy Co-ordination. Cambridge University Press.
- Vines and Currie (1995). North-South Linkages and International Macroeconomic Policy. Cambridge University Press.
- Currie (1997). The Pros and Cons of EMU. London: Economic Intelligence Unit. ISBN 0850589223.
- Currie (1998). Will the Euro Work? The Ins and Outs of EMU. London: Economic Intelligence Unit. ISBN 0850589983.

Orders of precedence in the United Kingdom
Preceded by The Lord Thomas of Gresford	Gentlemen; Baron Currie of Marylebone	Followed by The Lord Taylor of Warwick
