= Amersham Hospital =

- Buckinghamshire Healthcare NHS Trust
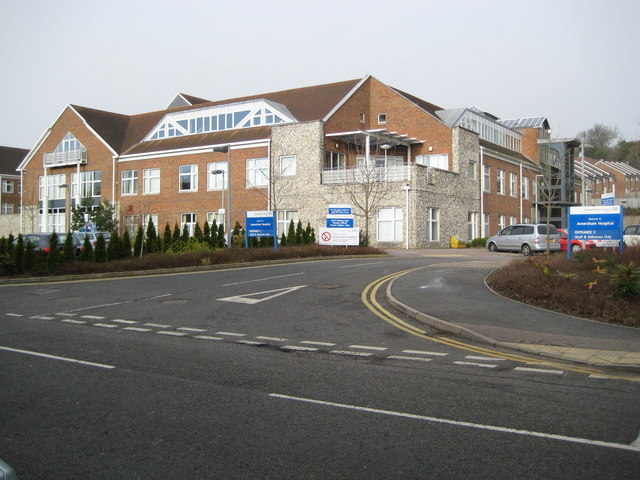
- Amersham Hospital

- Shown in Buckinghamshire

Geography
- Location: Amersham, Buckinghamshire, England
- Coordinates: 51.6629°N 0.6214°W

Organisation
- Care system: National Health Service

Services
- Emergency department: No

Links
- Website: www.buckshealthcare.nhs.uk/visiting-your-hospitals/visiting/amersham-hospital/

Amersham Hospital is located in Amersham, Buckinghamshire. It is one of three hospitals in the Buckinghamshire Healthcare NHS Trust.

== History ==
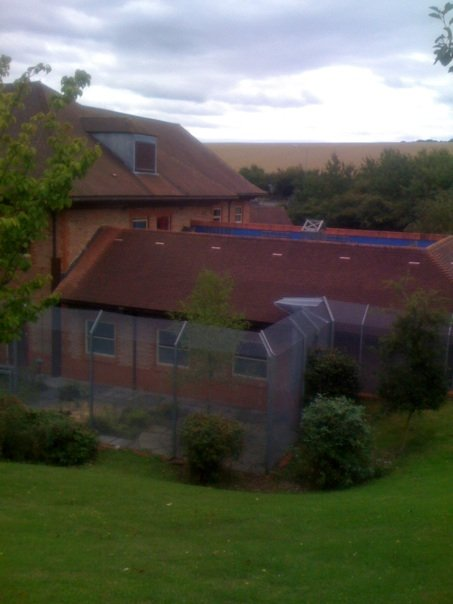
The Haleacre unit

An infirmary, which replaced the limited medical facilities in the local workhouse, was built at a cost of £3,400 with 34 beds and opened in 1906. It was renamed St Mary's Hospital in 1924 and extended in 1929. The site, which was further extended by wooden huts during the Second World War, became the Amersham General Hospital in 1948.

A new building to accommodate out-patients and casualties was opened in 1959, a new geriatric block was opened in 1967 and a new suite of operating theatres was opened in 1983. The Haleacre unit, which is guarded by high metal fencing and visibly secure fixtures and fittings inside and provides in-patient care for mentally ill people, opened in 1992.

A redevelopment scheme over much of the site was procured under a Private Finance Initiative contract in the late 1990s. The construction work was carried out by Taylor Woodrow and completed in 2000 as part of a scheme across the South Buckinghamshire hospitals at a cost of some £45 million.

== See also ==
- List of hospitals in England
