= Wycombe Hospital =

- Buckinghamshire Healthcare NHS Trust
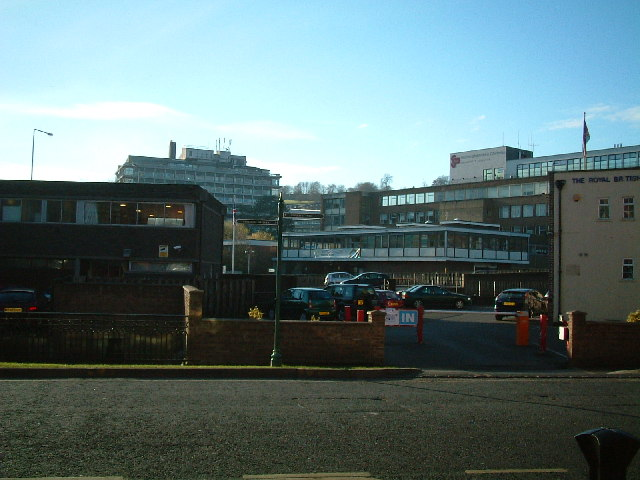
- Wycombe Hospital (on the hill in the background)

- Shown in Buckinghamshire

Geography
- Location: High Wycombe, Buckinghamshire, England
- Coordinates: 51.6262°N 0.7536°W

Organisation
- Care system: NHS
- Type: District General

Services
- Emergency department: No

Links
- Website: www.buckshealthcare.nhs.uk/visiting-your-hospitals/visiting/wycombe-hospital/

Wycombe Hospital is located in High Wycombe, Buckinghamshire. It is one of two acute and five community hospitals managed by the Buckinghamshire Healthcare NHS Trust.

== History ==
The original hospital built on Marlow Hill was the "High Wycombe War Memorial Hospital" which opened in 1923 and was extended in 1932. The current hospital, Wycombe Hospital, was built in phases on a site adjacent to the old Memorial Hospital with Phase 1 being completed in 1966, Phase 2 being completed in 1969 and Phase 3 being completed in 1971. An extension to the hospital was procured under a Private Finance Initiative contract in the late 1990s. The construction work was carried out by Taylor Woodrow and completed in 2000 as part of a scheme across the South Buckinghamshire hospitals at a cost of some £45 million.

The Accident and Emergency department was closed in 2005. A midwife-led birthing centre replaced the maternity unit and other services have been moved to the other hospitals run by the Trust. A campaign called Hand Back Our Hospital is attempting to restore services at the hospital. More than 6,000 people signed a petition calling for the restoration of the casualty department. Wycombe MP Steve Baker commissioned a report from the Durrow healthcare consultancy in 2014. This suggested that the hospital could be used for a "new generation" of casualty unit with an ambulance station integrated into the hospital and could offer GP appointments.

On 25 September 2006, Wycombe Hospital was one of the first hospitals to change their patient administration system to the National Programme for IT's Care Records Service.

== See also ==
- List of hospitals in England
