= Lewis Hammerson =

Lewis W. Hammerson (1916–1958) was the founder of Hammerson plc, one the United Kingdom's largest property businesses and a FTSE 250 company.

== Career ==
Lewis Hammerson initially joined the family garment business, Amalgamated Weatherware, in the 1930s. In 1942 he sold the family garment business and instead ventured into property, specifically housing, taking advantage of the need for apartments during World War II. His early developments included Castrol House in central London. He died in 1958 at the relatively early age of 42 but having established Hammerson as a leading property developer.

His wife, Sue, founded the Lewis W. Hammerson Memorial Hospital in Barnet in his memory.

== Family ==
He married Sarah "Sue" Waterman early in 1938, and they went on to have three children: David Hammerson, Peter Hammerson and Patricia Hammerson.
