= Buckinghamshire Healthcare NHS Trust =

Healthcare trust in England

- Type: NHS trust
- Established: 1 October 2002
- Hospitals: Amersham Hospital; Stoke Mandeville Hospital; Wycombe Hospital
- Chair: David Highton
- Chief executive: Neil Macdonald
- Staff: 6,300 FTE (2023/24)
- Website: www.buckshealthcare.nhs.uk

Buckinghamshire Healthcare NHS Trust is an NHS trust which runs Wycombe Hospital, Stoke Mandeville Hospital, Amersham Hospital, Buckingham Community Hospital and Florence Nightingale Hospice in Buckinghamshire, England.

== History ==
The trust was established as the Buckinghamshire Hospitals NHS Trust on 1 October 2002, and became operational on 1 April 2003. The trust changed to its current name on 1 November 2010.

Changes to hospital provision in the area have been made after neighbouring Heatherwood and Wexham Park Hospitals NHS Foundation Trust was taken over by Frimley Park Hospital NHS Foundation Trust in October 2014.

== Performance ==
In October 2013 as a result of the Keogh Review the Trust was put into the highest risk category by the Care Quality Commission. It was put into a buddying arrangement with Salford Royal NHS Foundation Trust.

In February 2014 the Trust announced it would invest £5 million to create 150 new nursing jobs to cut down on agency staff. "Before Christmas, we recruited 70 nurses and a further 97 nurses will be starting employment with the trust by April." The trust spent £19.3 million on agency staff in 2014/5.

A Care Quality Commission inspection in March 2014 found the trust had made 'significant progress' with 'real differences made in a relatively short time to improve quality and the patient experience'. Staff were said to be 'caring and compassionate and treated patients with dignity and respect'. As a result, the trust was taken out of special measures in June 2014.

In February 2016 it was expecting a deficit of £5.5 million for the year 2015/6.

== See also ==
- List of NHS trusts
