= McLean Homes =

Major British housebuilding business

- Industry: Housebuilding
- Founded: 1920
- Defunct: 1996
- Fate: Acquired
- Successor: Tarmac
- Headquarters: Wolverhampton, UK
- Key people: Sir Eric Pountain, (Chairman)

McLean Homes was a major British housebuilding business. It was bought by a major construction company, Tarmac, in 1972 and the brand ceased to be used in 1996.

== History ==
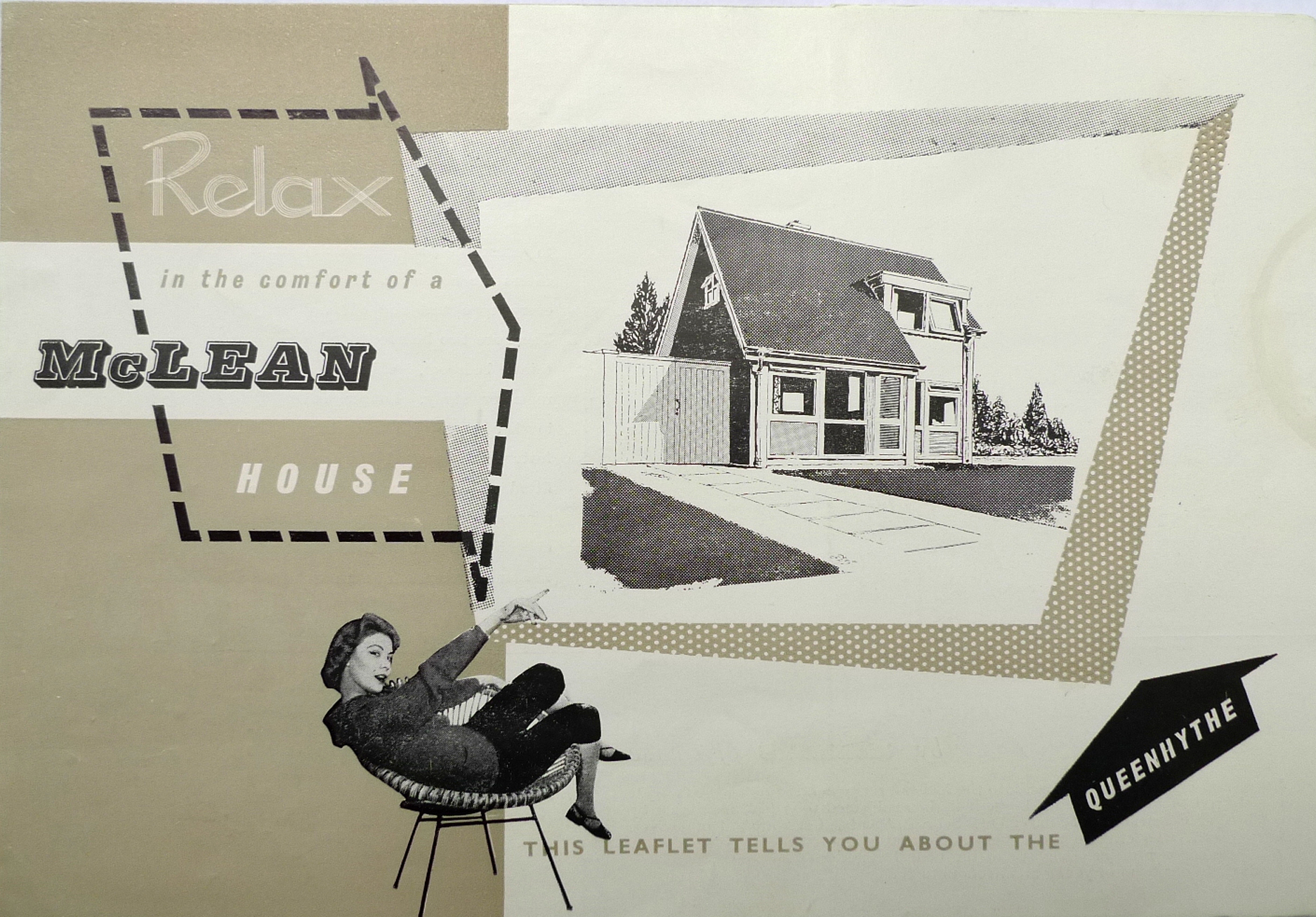
1960s McLean Homes brochure

The business was formed in 1920 by John McLean; it was incorporated in 1932. From the early 1950s, the company moved progressively into private housebuilding in the West Midlands. Around this same year, it also developed similar homes in Dublin in the Republic of Ireland. The firm was the second generation Geoffrey McLean who led the company's post-war growth. He was notable for the modern application of marketing methods, including the part exchange of customers' existing house, careful estate layouts and timber-framed production.

Following the flotation, growth was disappointing. During 1969, the company acquired Midland & General Developments, then controlled by one-time estate agent Eric Pountain. That same year, there were further losses on local authority housing contracts and McLean profits fell below their flotation level. Following a boardroom coup, Eric Pountain replaced Geoffrey McLean as managing director and the business was rationalised. Helped by a buoyant private housing market, housing sales reached the 1,000 per year mark. At the end of 1972, McLean agreed to a bid from Tarmac which wanted to strengthen its own poorly performing housing division.

The combination of the two companies, still trading as McLean Homes, produced a 2,000 unit per year housebuilder, putting the enlarged business into the top ten. Under Pountain's management, McLean steadily expanded its regional network and was building nearly 4,000 houses per year by the end of the 1970s, by which time Pountain had progressed to become managing director of the whole Tarmac group, following another boardroom coup. Housing continued to expand and, by 1987, McLean was the largest housebuilder in the country; sales in 1988 exceeded 12,000.

During 1989, Britain's economy entered a recession that took its toll on Tarmac, partially due to the decision to continue purchasing land even as the market was turning down. Provisions of over £130 million were eventually made against the housing division. In 1992, Pountain resigned as Tarmac Group's CEO. Thereafter, the firm was controlled by its construction division managing director. The housing division was reduced in scope and, in 1995, a decision was made to dispose of the group's housing interests. The result was an asset swap with Wimpey whereby Wimpey acquired Tarmac's housing interests in return for its construction and quarrying divisions.
