= George Wimpey (businessman) =

British housebuilding executive (1855–1913)

- Born: 1855; Hammersmith, London, England
- Died: 10 February 1913 (aged 57–58)
- Resting place: Margravine Cemetery
- Known for: Founding George Wimpey
- Spouse: Anne Jane Cunningham (1883–?)
- Children: 6

George Wimpey (1855 – 10 February 1913) was an English stonemason, builder and founder of the house building and construction company George Wimpey, which became one of the largest construction companies in the United Kingdom.

== Career ==
George Wimpey was born at Brook Green in Hammersmith in 1855 and later lived at 84 The Grove in Hammersmith.

In 1888 he went into partnership with Walter Tomes and together they created a business which, under their leadership, constructed many buildings including the first Hammersmith Town Hall and the White City Stadium, venue of the 1908 Olympic Games.

In later life he became Vice President of the Marlborough Cricket Club and one of the founding shareholders of Chelsea Football Club.

He died on 10 February 1913 aged 58 and is buried in the Hammersmith Cemetery.

== Family ==
Wimpey married Anne Jane Cunningham in 1883 and they had six children.
