= William G. Noel =

British-born medieval manuscript expert

William Gerard Noel
- Born: 1 August 1965; Frinton-on-Sea, England
- Died: 29 April 2024 (aged 58); Edinburgh, Scotland
- Education: University of Cambridge
- Known for: Archimedes Palimpsest
- Spouse: Lynn Ransom
- Children: 1
- Relatives: Robert Noel (brother)

William Gerard Noel (1 August 1965 –29 April 2024) was a British-born authority on medieval manuscripts, who spent most of his career working in academic institutions in the United States, where he advocated for free and open access to cultural heritage materials.

== Early life and education ==
William Gerard Noel was born in Frinton-on-Sea, England. He pursued his education at the University of Cambridge, where he earned his BA in art history in 1988, followed by an MA in 1991 and a PhD in 1993. His dissertation, titled “The Making of BL. Harley Mss. 2506 and 603,” was supervised by G. D. S. Henderson, and examined scriptorium practice and illustrated textual transmission in the Middle Ages.

== Career ==
Noel's career began at The J. Paul Getty Museum in Malibu, where he was assistant curator of manuscripts from 1991 to 1992. He then held a British Academy Postdoctoral Research Fellowship at Cambridge University from 1993 to 1996.

Noel's expertise in medieval manuscripts led him to The Walters Art Museum in Baltimore, where he was Curator of Manuscripts and Rare Books from 1997 to 2012.

In 2012, Noel became the founding director of The Schoenberg Institute for Manuscript Studies at the University of Pennsylvania Libraries, a position he held until 2020. Concurrently, he was director of The Kislak Center for Special Collections at Penn Libraries from 2012 to 2019. Noel's leadership extended to his role as Associate Vice-Provost for Strategic Partnerships at Penn Libraries from 2019 to 2020. He also was Chair (2018-2022) and Vice Chair (2013-2018) of the Philadelphia Area Consortium of Special Collections Libraries (PACSCL). After his death, the group instituted an award in his honor.

In 2020, Noel was appointed the inaugural John T. Maltsberger III ‘55 Associate University Librarian for Special Collections at Princeton University Library, where he expanded access to its holdings both in-person and virtually, as well as supporting the broadening of its collecting scope.

Noel taught courses at Johns Hopkins University and the University of Virginia's Rare Book School, including "The Fifteenth Century Book in Script and Print" and "The Medieval Manuscript in the Twenty-First Century."

== Contributions to manuscript studies ==
Noel curated numerous exhibitions, including "Lost and Found: The Secrets of Archimedes" at The Walters Art Museum in 2011, which traveled to the Huntington Museum in 2014.

His promotion of X-ray and multispectral imaging recovered unseen facets within medieval manuscripts. His publications include "The Archimedes Codex: Revealing the Secrets of the World’s Greatest Palimpsest" about the Archimedes Palimpsest, which he co-authored with Reviel Netz and which has been translated into 27 languages. His TED talk on the topic has been viewed more than 1 million times. He has also edited several volumes, such as "The Syriac Galen Palimpsest" and "The Utrecht Psalter in Medieval Art: Picturing the Psalms of David."

== Honors and awards ==
Noel's contributions were recognized with numerous awards, including the Sandars Reader in Bibliography at Cambridge University Library in 2019 and the White House Open Science Champion of Change in 2013.

The Archimedes Codex was awarded the Neumann Prize of the British Society for the History of Mathematics.

The Princeton University Library posthumously created the Will Noel Innovative Cultural Heritage Research Grant for cultural heritage professionals to work with the Library’s Special Collections and the Digital Studio’s specialized photographic equipment to gain new insights into our collective past.

In recognition of his work on the Archimedes Palimpsest, asteroid (53025) 1998 WD was posthumously named Willnoel in his honor. At around 3.3 km (2.1 mi) in diameter, Willnoel is one of the larger members of the Phocaea family. In November 2026, it was identified as a binary asteroid.

== Personal life and death ==
William Gerard Noel died on 29 April 2024 following a road accident in Edinburgh on 10 April. A memorial service was held in the Princeton University Chapel on 28 June 2024.

Noel was married to Lynn Ransom and they had a son, Henry. His brother is Robert Noel.
