= Robert Noel (businessman) =

British businessman

- Born: 12 June 1964 (age 62)
- Education: Marlborough College
- Alma mater: University of Reading
- Occupation: Businessman
- Years active: 1985–present
- Title: Chairman, Hammerson
- Term: September 2020-
- Predecessor: David Tyler
- Successor: Incumbent
- Spouse: Sophie Noel
- Children: 3
- Relatives: William G. Noel (brother)

Robert Montague Noel (born 12 June 1964) is a British businessman and the current chairman of Hammerson and Taylor Wimpey, both listed companies on the London Stock Exchange. He was the former chief executive of Land Securities, the largest commercial property company in the UK, from 2012 until March 2020.

== Early life ==
Noel was educated at Marlborough College. He went on to study at the University of Reading and graduated with a bachelor's degree in 1986. He is a qualified chartered surveyor.

== Business career ==
On 31 March 2012, Noel succeeded Francis Salway as chief executive of Land Securities. Noel had been managing director of the company's London properties, having joined Land Securities in January 2010 from Great Portland Estates plc, where he had been property director since 2002.

Noel has had other roles as chairman of the Westminster Property Association, a Director of The New West End Company and a trustee and director of the charity LandAid.

In March 2020, he stood down as chief executive of Land Securities.

In September 2020, he was appointed as the chairman of Hammerson plc.

In December 2022, it was announced that Noel would succeed Irene Dorner as chair of Taylor Wimpey after the company's April 2023 AGM.

== Public roles ==
On 29 February 2024 Noel was reappointed to the Board of Trustees of the Natural History Museum for a two year term.

== Personal life ==
Noel and his French wife Sophie have a son and two daughters, and own homes in London and Frinton-on-Sea, Essex. Noel has a tattoo on his bottom (believed to be an elephant), obtained in Thailand in his youth.
