= Hammerson =

British real estate company

Hammerson PLC
- Type: Public limited company (PLC)
- Traded as: LSE: HMSO; ISEQ 20 component; FTSE 250 component
- Industry: Property
- Founded: 1942; 84 years ago
- Founder: Lewis Hammerson
- Headquarters: London, England, United Kingdom
- Key people: Robert Noel (Chairman); Rob Wilkinson (CEO)
- Products: Investment, Property management
- Revenue: ▲£211.4 million (2025)
- Operating income: ▲£262.8 million (2025)
- Net income: ▲£232.5 million (2025)
- Website: hammerson.com

Hammerson is a major British property development and investment company. The firm switched to real estate investment trust (REIT) status when they were introduced in the United Kingdom in January 2007.

It is listed on the London Stock Exchange and is a constituent of the FTSE 250 Index; it is also a constituent of the FTSE EPRA/NAREIT Developed Europe index, among others. Hammerson's portfolio includes properties in the United Kingdom, France and Ireland. It's core focus is on investing in and managing major retail-led properties which serve large urban catchments.

== History ==
The business was founded by Lewis Hammerson, who began to invest in property in 1942, converting houses into apartments.

His company L.W. Hammerson & Co moved into the commercial property sector in 1948 and became a listed company in 1953. It first expanded outside the UK in the 1960s, when it moved into Australia, New Zealand and the United States. In the 1970s it ventured onto the continent and back in the UK it developed the Brent Cross Shopping Centre, which was the first major covered shopping centre in the country.

In the 1990s the operations outside Europe were sold and further properties were acquired in Europe. The year 2003 saw the opening of the new Bull Ring shopping centre in Birmingham, which was one of the largest city centre retail developments ever built in the UK.

In October 2012, Hammerson sold its office property at Gresham Street in London for £200 million to Retirement Fund (Incorporated), the Malaysian state pension fund.

In December 2017, Hammerson announced its intention to take over rival Intu in a £3.4 billion deal; however, later in April 2018, Hammerson announced that it was withdrawing its recommendation (to proceed with the takeover) citing concerns about the health of the UK retail market.

In March 2018, Hammerson rejected a £4.9 billion takeover offer from the French property development firm, Klépierre.

In July 2018, Hammerson announced to sell off £1.1bn of properties by 2019 as it exits the retail park sector and focuses on "flagship retail destinations".

In July 2026, Hammerson acquired a 50% stake in Manchester Arndale in Manchester.

== Operations ==
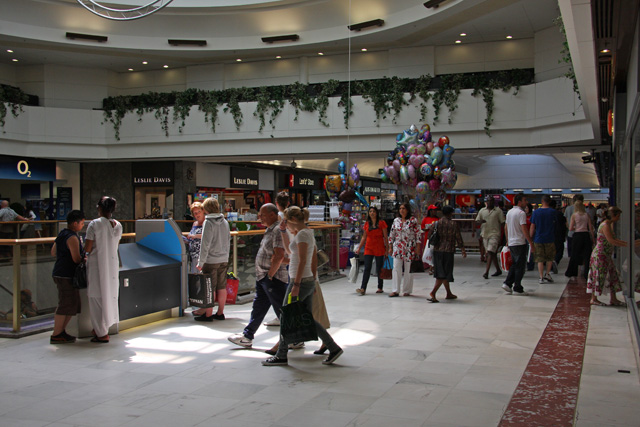
Brent Cross Shopping Centre in London

The company's portfolio, including its investment in joint ventures and associates, was valued at £3.5 billion as at 31 December 2025. Hammerson have interests in several major retail developments, including:

- Dundrum Town Centre, Dublin, Ireland
- Ilac Centre, Dublin, Ireland
- Swords Pavilions, Dublin, Ireland
- Les 3 Fontaines, Cergy-Pontoise, France
- O'Parinor, Aulnay-sous-Bois, France
- Brent Cross Shopping Centre, London, UK
- Bull Ring, Birmingham, UK
- Manchester Arndale, Manchester, UK
- Cabot Circus, Bristol, UK
- Grand Central, Birmingham, UK
- The Oracle, Reading, UK
- Westquay, Southampton, UK

Hammerson, Henderson Group and Future Fund together form the Birmingham Alliance, who are responsible for the Bullring, Martineau Place and the up-coming Martineau Galleries development.

== See also ==
- List of companies based in London
