= Semperian =

British investment fund

Semperian is an investment fund based in Jersey. It holds investments in 92 Private finance initiative projects.

It was formerly part of Telereal Trillium. In 2010 it had £1.4bn of assets under management, and reported that its investors expect to make a 10% return a year.

It reported profits of £272 million in 2014/5.

In November 2015 it acquired MAMG Asset Management Group.

In January 2022 it had investments in 94 assets mostly in the UK, with government-backed and inflation-linked cash flow streams, including accommodation, hospital beds, car parking spaces, schools and road assets.
