= Bob Noel =

American football equipment manager (1925–1999)

- Noel working on a helmet in an undated photo
- Born: May 25, 1925; Green Bay, Wisconsin, U.S.
- Died: January 2, 1999 (aged 73); Green Bay, Wisconsin, U.S.
- Occupation: Equipment manager
- Years active: 1951–1998
- Known for: Equipment manager, Green Bay Packers

Robert J. Noel (May 25, 1925 – January 2, 1999) was an American equipment manager who worked for the Green Bay Packers from 1951 to 1993. He was the head equipment manager of the team from 1977 to 1993 and posthumously received the Pro Football Hall of Fame's Award of Excellence in 2023, recognizing "significant contributors to the game of professional football".

== Early life and education ==
Noel was born in Green Bay, Wisconsin, on May 25, 1925. He had a twin sister and five other siblings. Noel attended Central Catholic High School in Wisconsin; while still in high school, he enlisted in World War II at the age of 18. He played football as an end while at Central.

== Career ==
In 1951, Noel joined the Green Bay Packers of the National Football League (NFL) as a part-time equipment assistant. After 16 years in that role, he was hired as a full-time equipment employee by Vince Lombardi in 1967, being the first full-time employee in the team's equipment department. He officially held the position of "assistant equipment manager". He worked under G. E. "Dad" Braisher before succeeding him as head equipment manager in 1977, being the fourth person in team history to hold the position.

In his position, Noel was in charge of all of the team and player equipment, with tasks ranging from keeping track of the uniforms to packing them up after each game and dealing "with all the dirty laundry". In addition to working with the uniforms of the players, Noel was also responsible for field and game equipment, the team Gatorade supply, and a "lot of smaller things" needed for each game; the Green Bay Press-Gazette noted among them: "Tape, headsets, rosin bags, telephone sets, extra t-shirts, and a stretcher have to be taken," as well as 30 game balls. In-season, he worked seven days a week, starting at 7 a.m. and working until 9 p.m., often working later than that as well. An article from the Wisconsin State Journal noted, "A blunt, no-nonsense man who is very possessive of even the most mundane and inexpensive piece of equipment, Noel is the ideal equipment manager. He is a stickler for itemizing everything".

Noel ultimately served with the Packers for 43 years – from 1951 to 1993. Starting under Gene Ronzani, he worked for a total of 11 head coaches and worked with 19 of the 28 Packers inducted into the Pro Football Hall of Fame, being a member of five league championship teams. He remained with the Packers until being abruptly fired by general manager Ron Wolf in January 1994. The reason given was for the locker room not being clean; Noel said that he was "shocked – I've cried more than one time. I put my heart and soul into this thing. I don't know what in the hell I could've done more". He said that a lawyer told him he had a "heck of a case" against the Packers, but Noel said that he had "too much love" for the team to take legal action against them.

Packers historian and executive Lee Remmel called Noel "a Packer legend in his own right. He served the team faithfully and well for a long time". Bob Harlan said that: "I don't think there's any way to describe his value to the organization. You could come in here in February or March, or all day Sundays, and Bob was here working. He was very popular with the players. He was the perfect person for what he was doing".

Noel posthumously received the Pro Football Hall of Fame's Award of Excellence in 2023, which recognizes "significant contributors to the game of professional football".

== Personal life ==
Noel married Evelyn Zacher on November 30, 1957. He was a member of the Athletic Equipment Managers Association and was active in local organizations. He sung in choirs, volunteered in several charitable groups and was a member of the Knights of Columbus. He attended Packers games even after his tenure with the team ended and volunteered as equipment manager for Green Bay's Notre Dame Academy in August 1995, where he served until his death.

== Death ==
Noel died on January 2, 1999, at the age of 73. Former Packers player Dale Livingston said of Noel:

Bob always had a warm greeting for the players and was well liked by all. He treated rookies as well as the All-Pros the same. When Bob left the Packers, he continued to do work in the community he loved. Bob was always there to help if anyone needed anything. I am proud to have known Bob and I am sure I speak for many others when I say he will be missed.
