= George Wimpey =

British construction firm company

George Wimpey Limited
- Company type: Private
- Industry: Housebuilding
- Founded: 1880; 146 years ago
- Headquarters: London, England, United Kingdom
- Key people: John Robinson (chairman); Peter Redfern (CEO)
- Revenue: £3,147.4 million (2006)
- Operating income: £362.1 million (2006)
- Net income: £218.0 million (2006)
- Number of employees: 6,050 (2005)
- Parent: Taylor Wimpey
- Website: taylorwimpey.co.uk

George Wimpey Limited was a British construction firm that typically worked in the civil engineering and housebuilding markets. It was, during the 1970s, the largest homebuilder active in the UK.

Established in 1880 and originally based in Hammersmith, the company's early activities were orientated around its road surfacing contractor role, as well as civil engineering, such as the construction of the White City Stadium complex and similar facilities. Following the death of George Wimpey in 1913, the business was acquired from the Wimpey family by Godfrey Mitchell in 1919. Mitchell would head the company for over half a century, making several key decisions such as to enter the private housebuilding sector during the 1920s. During 1934, George Wimpey went public on the London Stock Exchange; however, an unusual ownership scheme was enacted, under which the charitable Tudor Trust held about half of the firm's shares, an arrangement that lasted for several decades.

Throughout the Second World War, Wimpey contributed to the war effort through the construction of numerous airfields, factories, and other facilities to meet Britain's needs. After the war, the company secured substantial work from various local authorities to produce houses. It played a leading role in the use of no-fines concrete construction to produce new homes. Throughout the 1950s and the following two decades, Wimpey's building and civil engineering divisions expanded substantially, not just domestically but internationally as well, to the point that the firm became one of Britain's larger international contractors. A return to private homebuilding and a series of lucrative opportunities, particularly in the Middle East, had fuelled the company's growth. However, following the stepping down of Mitchell, the company appeared to lose direction and Wimpey's fiscal performance suffered during the late 1980s and early 1990s.

The early 1990s would see substantial changes, ranging from a reorganisation that replaced the traditional regional model to instead orient around key business activities to the disposal of several non-core business sectors. During 1995, Wimpey and rival company Tarmac agreed to the transference of the former's construction and minerals divisions in exchange the latter's housing division (largely McLean Homes). In the following years, McAlpine Homes was acquired from Alfred McAlpine while Laing Homes was also purchased from John Laing. Accordingly, Wimpey became increasingly centred around the housebuilding market. In July 2007, Wimpey merged with Taylor Woodrow to create Taylor Wimpey, the largest homebuilder in the UK.

== History ==
=== Early years ===
The business was founded by George Wimpey and Walter Tomes as a stone working partnership in 1880 in Hammersmith. The company built the first Hammersmith Town Hall in 1896, and went on to lay the foundations for the first "electric tramway" in London in the late 1890s. The company also built the 140-acre (0.57 km^{2}) White City Stadium complex, which included a series of pavilions and gardens for the Franco British Exhibition of 1908, as well as an 80,000-seat Olympic stadium for the 1908 Olympic Games.

=== The Mitchell Era ===
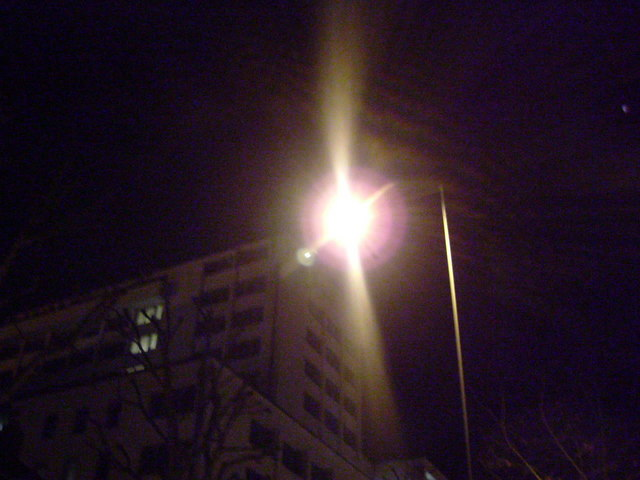
The former headquarters of George Wimpey in Hammersmith Grove, London

During 1913, George Wimpey died at the age of 58; his family put the business up for sale six years later. Godfrey Mitchell, who had served in the Royal Engineers during the First World War, purchased the firm and decided to retain the Wimpey name. Mitchell would serve as George Wimpey's executive chairman for over 50 years and prove to be decisive in the company's fortunes during this time.

In the interwar period, Mitchell built up a fleet of steamrollers and took contracts for both public and private paving jobs, a considerable proportion of this work coming from new housing estates. Mitchell observed that the company could make more money as a developer than just as a contractor; having first tested this with his own money, Mitchell initiated the company's first residential development, the Greenford Park Estate, during 1928. By 1930, Wimpey was building around five hundred houses per year, rising to a peak of 1,370 during 1934.

However, the company's private housebuilding activities were abruptly ceased at the outbreak of the Second World War in September 1939, throughout which Wimpey concentrated on defence-related undertakings. Accordingly, it built 93 facilities, ranging from aerodromes and factories to army camps. By the end of the conflict, it had become one of the country's largest contractors.

In the immediate post war period, building controls prevented any substantial return to private housebuilding and Wimpey turned instead to the local authority market and, by the early 1950s, Wimpey was building 18,000 houses per year on behalf of various local authorities. Wimpey was pre-eminent in the use of no-fines concrete construction (concrete made without sand) in both high and low rise housing; this technique was particularly valuable amid a shortage of bricks and several other standard building materials. It was also expanding its building and civil engineering divisions, particularly overseas where it became one of the larger international contractors. The end of building controls in 1954 allowed Wimpey to re-enter the private housing market. It did so in a substantial way through its regional structure, becoming the country's first national housebuilder; by 1972, Wimpey was building private houses at an annual rate of 12,500, some three times the rate of its nearest competitor.

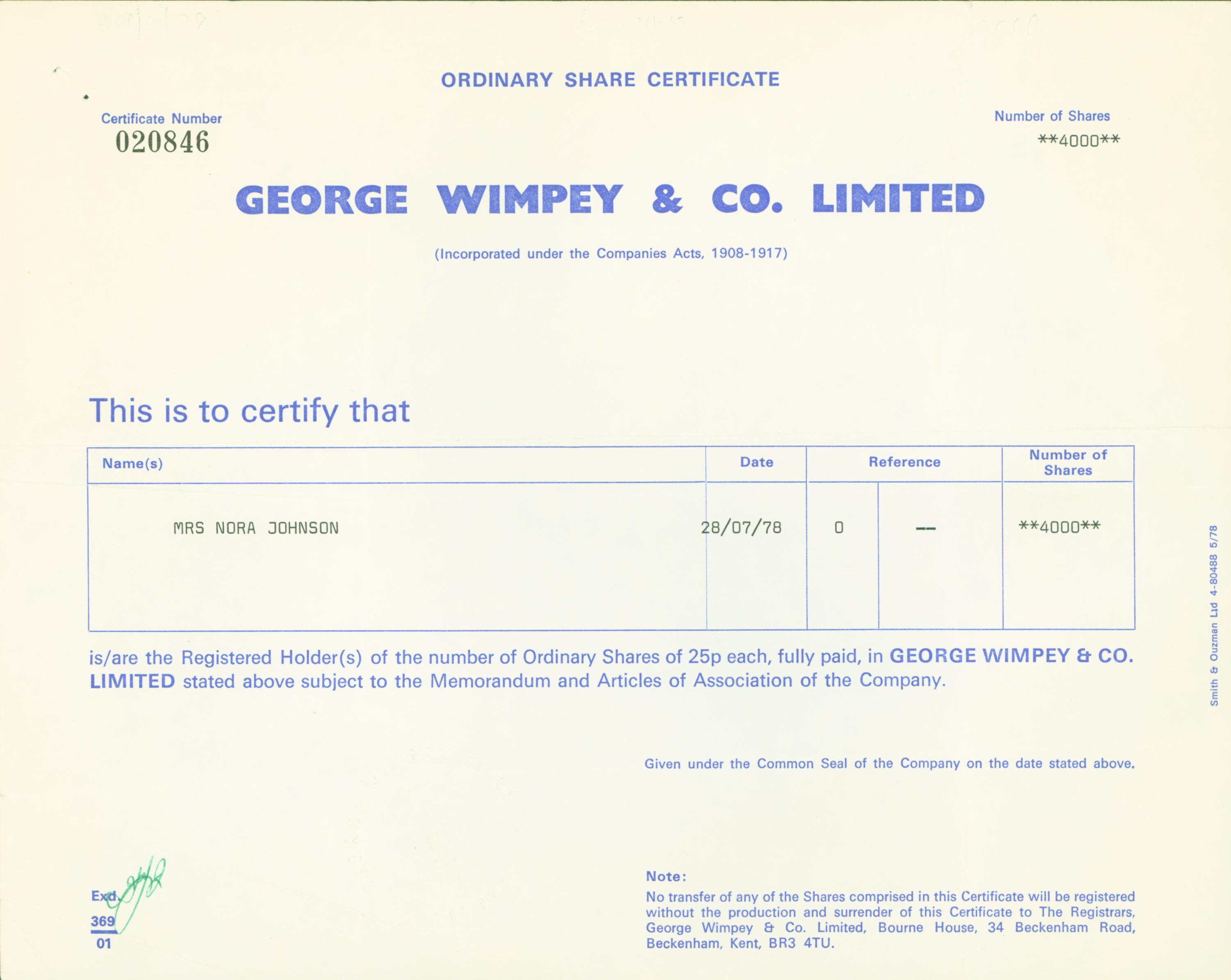
Share certificate issued by George Wimpey & Co. Limited on 28 July 1978

Although Wimpey experienced rising profits in the 1970s, which was largely attributed to its Middle East contracting, the group was beginning to lose direction. While Godfrey Mitchell retired as Chairman in 1973, he remained a director and a dominant figure in the company's operations until his eventual retirement from the Board in 1981 following his 90th birthday. Operational control was diffused between four joint managing directors, and the regions rather than the centre were the dominant force. Unlike some of the newer housebuilders, Wimpey's housing was mixed in operationally with its construction business. Volumes declined and, by the end of the 1980s, private housing sales were down to around 5,000 houses per year.

=== Acquisitions and Merger ===
The 1990s was a difficult period for the business, particularly in light of the economic consequences of the early 1990s recession; both the housebuilding and civil engineering sectors were hit heavily, leading to a loss of £112 million being recorded in 1992, although profitability did quickly recover. A reorganisation of Wimpey's structure, centred around key business areas, rather than geographic regions, was conducted. Furthermore, a few non-core businesses, such as its waste management activities, were divested while various properties held by the firm were written down or sold, decreasing the size of the group somewhat.

Despite the company's initial attempts to change this trend, private housing had remained contractor dominated by this time. A major turning point came in November 1995 when the Board announced a radical solution: Wimpey was to transfer its construction and minerals divisions to Tarmac in return for the latter's housing division (largely McLean Homes). Thereafter, Wimpey was once again selling 12,000 private houses per year.

Two more major housing acquisitions followed, both divisions of contractors seeking to focus on their core contracting business. In August 2001, McAlpine Homes was acquired from Alfred McAlpine, bringing with it a 4,000 houses per year business; during the following year, Wimpey also bought the 1,200 houses per year Laing Homes from John Laing.

In March 2007, the company announced plans for a £6 billion nil premium merger with Taylor Woodrow, to be called Taylor Wimpey. The merger was effected by means of a scheme of arrangement, leaving the original Taylor Woodrow shareholders with 51% of the new Taylor Wimpey. Taylor Woodrow provided the new chairman and finance director, while the chief executive and the managing director came from Wimpey.

== Tudor Trust ==
When Mitchell took George Wimpey public in 1934, he set up a unique ownership scheme wherein the charitable Tudor Trust held about half of the firm's shares. This arrangement had considerable benefits to the business, making it less beholden to other shareholders and making Wimpey a difficult target for a potential hostile takeovers; however, it did hinder the raising of further capital from shareholders. the company's management would periodically meet with representatives of the Tudor Trust to discuss the direction of the business. The Tudor Trust later diluted its stake to 5% (as a result of a rights issue) from 34%, which was in itself steadily reduced over the years. Just before the Taylor Wimpey merger on 2 July 2007, the Tudor Trust no longer held a reportable interest in its own name in George Wimpey, such interest being below the declarable 3% threshold.

== Operations ==
Clifford Chetwood was appointed to head Wimpey in 1982. The company then had over 40,000 employees and annual revenue of £1 billion, divided between a large number of British subsidiaries. Over the next ten years, Chetwood set out to convert these into three principle divisions, Homes, Construction, and Minerals, the aim being to create divisional autonomy and responsibility.

=== United Kingdom housebuilding ===
George Wimpey homes in the United Kingdom were sold under three distinct brands: the core 'George Wimpey' brand, the 'Laing Homes' brand, which had previously been used solely in the South East and Midlands, and the affordable 'G2' brand launched in 2006. In the 1970s, George Wimpey became the United Kingdom's largest private house builder, selling 106,440 homes in the decade, and in the 1980s, George Wimpey began to reinforce Wimpey Homes as a brand, focusing on quality compact housing. Advertising, featuring the famous Wimpey cat, ensured Wimpey Homes became a household name in house building.

By 2002, there were four brands: Wimpey Homes, McLean Homes, McAlpine Homes and Laing Homes. Under the leadership of the current chief executive, Peter Redfern, (who was then head of housing), the operations were merged, and ‘Wimpey Homes’, ‘McLean Homes’ and ‘McAlpine Homes’ were replaced with ‘George Wimpey’ under a new three-dimensional purple and orange squares corporate identity. Laing Homes was retained due to its more upmarket status and its greater brand recognition. This brand disappeared in June 2008, as a result of the merger with Taylor Woodrow.

During 2006, George Wimpey launched an affordable 'G2' brand, focussing on one and two bedroom luxury apartments. Its prime target markets were value-conscious first time buyers and key workers.

=== Sponsorship ===
George Wimpey was the Main Sponsor of St Johnstone F.C. until 2008/09, when George Wimpey and Taylor Woodrow merged.

=== Wimpey Construction ===
Wimpey logo in use in the 1990s

Wimpey logo in use in the 1970s and 1980s

Wimpey Construction was one of the leading construction businesses in the United Kingdom, Canada and the Middle East, engaging in a wide range of building and civil engineering activities. Major non-housing construction projects have included:

- the White City Stadium completed in 1908
- the Team Valley Trading Estate completed in 1938
- Heathrow Airport completed in 1946
- the Clunie Dam in Scotland completed in 1950
- the Bank of China Building in Hong Kong completed in 1952
- the Hirfanlı Dam in Turkey completed in 1956
- the Loch Shin Dam in Scotland completed in 1960
- the Furnas Dam in Brazil completed in 1963
- the Centre Point building in London completed in 1966
- Euston Tower in London completed in 1970
- the Llyn Brianne Dam completed in 1972
- the HSBC Tower in Hong Kong completed in 1985
- the Gyle Shopping Centre completed in 1993
- the Channel Tunnel completed in 1994

=== Wimpey Minerals ===
Wimpey Minerals was one of the largest aggregate, coated stone and construction material producers, with significant operations in the United Kingdom and United States, and smaller operations overseas.

=== North American operations ===
George Wimpey also had operations in the United States trading under Morrison Homes, which was acquired in 1984 when it was based in San Francisco, Northern California. George Wimpey later added to its US operations with the acquisition of Richardson Homes of Denver, Colorado in 2001.

Morrison Homes was initially founded in Seattle in 1905 by C.G. Morrison and moved to northern California in 1946. Operations were extended to cover Phoenix, Central Valley, Sacramento, Denver, Fort Myers, Jacksonville, Orlando, Sarasota, Tampa, Reno, Austin, Dallas Fort Worth and Houston.

== Musical references ==
Along with Sir Robert McAlpine and John Laing, Wimpey is mentioned in the opening preamble to Dominic Behan's 1960 satirical Irish ballad, "McAlpine's Fusiliers". It is also mentioned in another Dominic Behan song, "Building Up and Tearing England Down" (sometimes called "Paddy on the Road").
