= Francis Taylor, Baron Taylor of Hadfield =

British businessman (1905–1995)

Francis Taylor, Baron Taylor of Hadfield (7 January 1905 – 15 February 1995) was an English businessman who founded Taylor Woodrow, a leading international contractor and developer.

== Career ==
He was born in Hadfield, near Glossop in Derbyshire in 1905. By the age of 11, he was operating his father's fruit business. The family moved to Blackpool where at the age of 16, with help from his father and a bank, he spent £400 developing two houses which he sold at a substantial profit (£1000 each). This was the beginning of the business which Frank Taylor founded, to which his uncle Jack Woodrow also lent his name, now known as Taylor Woodrow.

In 1974, he was given a knighthood. In 1979, he resigned as managing director and became life president. He was created a Life Peer on 27 January 1983 as Baron Taylor of Hadfield, of Hadfield in the County of Derbyshire.

Lord Taylor of Hadfield continued to hold the position of Life President until his death on 15 February 1995. He died while visiting Taylor Woodrow's 3,500-home flagship development, The Meadows, in Sarasota, Florida.

== Family ==
Taylor's second wife, Christine, who was also involved with Taylor Woodrow, lived with her daughter Sarah Melville until she died in 2011.
