= Landsec =

British real estate investment trust

Land Securities Group plc

- Company headquarters at 100 Victoria Street, London
- Trade name: Landsec
- Type: Public
- Traded as: LSE: LAND; FTSE 100 Component
- Industry: Property
- Founded: 1944; 82 years ago
- Headquarters: London, England, UK
- Key people: Sir Ian Cheshire (Chairman); Mark Allan (CEO)
- Products: property development; Property investment
- Revenue: ▲£860 million (2026)
- Operating income: ▲£492 million (2026)
- Net income: ▼£344 million (2026)
- Website: landsec.com

Land Securities Group plc, trading as Landsec, is the largest commercial property development and investment company in the United Kingdom. The firm became a real estate investment trust (REIT) when REITs were introduced in the United Kingdom in January 2007. It is headquartered in London, England, and traded on the London Stock Exchange, and is a constituent of the FTSE 100 Index.

== History ==
The company traces its origins to 1944, when its founder Harold Samuel purchased Land Securities Investment Trust Limited, which owned three houses in Kensington and some government stock. Further acquisitions followed shortly afterwards and from 1947 the company concentrated on commercial property. In the early days some non-UK investments were acquired, but in 1971 these were sold off and the company decided to focus solely on the UK market. The company name was changed to Land Securities plc in 1982.

After buying Trillium in 2000, in 2002 it formed a 50/50 joint venture company (Telereal Trillium) with William Pears Group (WPG) to buy the property portfolio of British Telecom: after selling its shares in Telereal to WPG in 2007, Land Securities sold Trillium to WPG in 2009.

On 31 March 2012, Francis Salway was succeeded as chief executive by Robert Noel. Noel was managing director of the company's London properties, having joined Land Securities in January 2010 from Great Portland Estates plc.

On 12 June 2017, Land Securities rebranded as Landsec, although the registered company name remained Land Securities Group PLC.

In 2019, Landsec launched a series of open plan offices under the brand "Myo". The first Myo office opened that year, at 123 Victoria Street, London, followed by the second Myo office, at Liverpool Street, in May 2021.

In November 2020, amid the COVID-19 pandemic in the United Kingdom, Landsec announced plans to sell £4 billion of assets in the next four to five years, including hotels, leisure properties and retail parks affected by pandemic.

In November 2021, Landsec announced it was to acquire urban regeneration specialist U+I for £190 million.

In December 2021, Landsec increased its 30% ownership in the Bluewater Shopping Centre by acquiring a further 25% share from Lendlease Retail Partnership for £172 million. At the same time Landsec confirmed the sale of 25% of the newly acquired shares to M&G, one of Bluewater's co-owners. Landsec's overall share increased to 48.75%.

== Operations ==
Cardinal Place development in 2024

Landsec owns and manages more than 24,000,000 sq ft (2,200,000 m^{2}) of commercial property, from London offices and high street shops to major shopping centres and out-of-town retail parks. On 31 March 2026 the company's property portfolio was valued at £10.0 billion. The company owns the Piccadilly Lights in Piccadilly Circus in London. It has also led Project Nova, the development of the area around London Victoria station.

In 2010, Landsec purchased a number of tenement blocks in Victoria, central London, which had previously been used as a homeless shelter, and subsequently received multiple planning permissions for the site. As of 2021, after the buildings had remained empty for over a decade, the company said it planned to convert the buildings into flats.

== Public engagement ==
On 8 May 2021, for World Ovarian Cancer Day, Landsec participated in the Cure our Ovarian Cancer Foundation's international awareness campaign. Their spot "An ad you can't miss, for a cancer you do", which shows 30 women who had been diagnosed with ovarian cancer, was screened at Piccadilly Circus, London, and Time Square, New York City. The spot was a pro bono production by Topham Guerin with Landsec and JCDecaux sponsoring the screening space.
