= Taylor Woodrow =

Former British construction company

- Company type: Private
- Industry: Housebuilding/Construction
- Founded: 1921; 105 years ago
- Defunct: 3 July 2007; 18 years ago
- Headquarters: London, England
- Key people: Norman Askew, Chairman; Ian Smith, CEO
- Revenue: £3,572.1 million (2006)
- Operating income: £469.8 million (2006)
- Net income: £290.6 million (2006)
- Number of employees: 8,132 (2005)
- Parent: Taylor Wimpey plc
- Website: www.taylorwoodrow.com

Taylor Woodrow was one of the largest housebuilding and general construction companies in Britain. It was listed on the London Stock Exchange and was a constituent of the FTSE 100 Index until its merger with rival housebuilder George Wimpey to create Taylor Wimpey on 3 July 2007.

Taylor Woodrow was created from the work of Frank Taylor and his uncle, Jack Woodrow; Frank started building homes in Blackpool at the age of 16 in 1921. During 1930, the company relocated to London and rapidly increased its activities in the private housing market as well as entering the general construction sector as well. In 1935, the various housebuilding companies were amalgamated and floated on the London Stock Exchange as Taylor Woodrow Estates. Taylor Woodrow Construction formed two years later. Private housebuilding was halted during the Second World War; instead, the company built various military facilities and factories to support the British war effort.

By the conflict's end, Taylor Woodrow was a substantial construction company; it quickly spread internationally and engaged in a wide variety of work, both for the private and public sectors. During the 1950s and 1960s, it was involved in the construction of the world's first commercial nuclear power station (Calder Hall), the Liverpool Metropolitan Cathedral, and the St Katharine Docks complex. Between the 1950s and the beginning of the 1980s, while Taylor Woodrow was involved in private housebuilding, it was a relatively small endeavour in comparison to its other activities. In the mid-1970s, overseas profits accounted for two thirds of group profits, a large proportion of which originated from the firm's work in the Middle East. As part of a consortium, Taylor Woodrow worked on the Channel Tunnel throughout the 1980s and 1990s, amongst other major civil engineering works and commercial projects.

However, the collapse of the property boom amid the early 1990s recession led to the company becoming increasingly centered around the private housebuilding sector. The acquisition of both Heron Homes and Bryant during this decade made the company into one of the top five housebuilders in Britain. In March 2007, the company announced plans for a £6 billion nil premium merger with George Wimpey. In September 2008, Vinci plc, the British subsidiary of France's Vinci SA, acquired Taylor Woodrow Construction from Taylor Wimpey for £74m.

== History ==
=== Early years ===
Frank Taylor was working in the family fruit wholesaling business in Blackpool when, in 1921, at the age of 16, he persuaded his father that he could build a house for them to live in. Using some capital provided by his father and supplemented by a bank loan, Frank Taylor built a pair of semi-detached houses, one of which he promptly sold at a good profit. It was only after financing Taylor's growing housebuilding work for another two years that the bank manager realised that his client was under the legal age for conveying land and his uncle, Jack Woodrow, was brought into the business, creating the Taylor Woodrow name.

During 1930, Frank Taylor moved down from Blackpool to London where Taylor Woodrow rapidly expanded the scale of its private housebuilding – by the mid-1930s, it was building at a rate of 1,200-1,500 houses per year. The company built over 1,000 houses at Grange Park in Hayes and set up its headquarters on Adrienne Avenue in Southall. It also diversified into more general construction around this time.

In 1935, the various housebuilding companies were amalgamated and floated on the London Stock Exchange as Taylor Woodrow Estates. Two years later, Taylor Woodrow Construction was formed and, after a modest start, the company was soon heavily engaged in defence work. Following the outbreak of the Second World War during 1939, all private housing development stopped. For six years, Taylor Woodrow built numerous military camps, airfields and factories; one of the more extensive single projects the firm was involved in was the construction of the Mulberry harbour units.

=== Post war ===
By the end of the conflict, Taylor Woodrow had become a substantial construction business. This expertise was quickly turned towards civil construction work at home and the start of what was to become the group's international business. The first overseas construction was in East Africa where, amongst other things, Taylor Woodrow was involved in the notorious Groundnut Scheme. Later moves brought the company into both West Africa and South Africa. Throughout the 1950s, Taylor Woodrow expanded into Australia, Canada (including housing) and the Middle East, the latter region would prove to be a particularly lucrative one for the business.

At home, Taylor Woodrow Construction engaged in a wide variety of work, both for the private and public sectors, but what stood out was its role in the United Kingdom power generation industry: after a string of conventional power stations, the company was the contractor for the world's first commercial nuclear power station, Calder Hall, followed by Hartlepool, Hinkley Point A, Wylfa and Sizewell A. In the private sector, notable contracts undertaken by the company included terminal buildings at Heathrow Airport and the Liverpool Metropolitan Cathedral.

Taylor Woodrow's original private housebuilding business was not neglected. Once building controls were abolished, Taylor Woodrow, (in the shape of Taywood Homes), responded rapidly and, by 1956, sales were back to their best pre-war levels. However, with Frank Taylor running an international construction business, yet still controlling site purchases himself, Taywood Homes never benefited from the post-war housing boom; indeed, housing sales actually declined and, at the beginning of the 1980s, Taywood Homes was still only building around 500 to 600 houses per year.

Largely as a result of its Middle East presence, Taylor Woodrow's international construction business went from strength to strength and, by the mid-1970s, overseas profits accounted for two thirds of group profits. The centrepiece was the joint venture with Costain to build the dry docks at Port Rashid Dubai, described as "the largest single overseas contract ever undertaken by the British construction industry".

However, by the 1980s, Middle East construction was declining; in its place, a new source of growth emerged as the decade went on – commercial property development. Taylor Woodrow entered the commercial property market during 1964, its flagship project being the St Katharine Docks complex. By 1989, almost 60% of group profits was coming from rents, development profits, and the sale of long-term investment properties. Around this time, the company was amongst the most profitable construction companies in Britain.

=== Private housing revival ===
The collapse of the property boom amid the early 1990s recession led to exceptional write offs of more than £100 million being incurred in 1991 and 1992. At the same time, few in the construction industry were making substantial profits. Gradually, Taylor Woodrow's construction business was reduced in size and the emphasis of the group was redirected to private housing – both in the United Kingdom and North America. In March 1994, Taywood Homes was strengthened, by the acquisition of Heron Homes taking its sales to an annual rate of 1,000, while overseas the success of its United States and Canadian subsidiaries gave the group an extra 2,000 per year sales.

By the end of the 1990s, Taylor Woodrow was describing itself as an international housing and property group. The last major civil engineering contract undertaken by the firm was as a part of the Channel Tunnel consortium (completed in 1994) and although there were still substantial building contracts, including the National Assembly for Wales (completed in 2006), such construction work was a diminishing area for the business.

In January 2001, Taylor Woodrow intervened in the proposed merger of Bryant–Beazer, buying Bryant for £632 million in cash and shares. Adding Bryant's annual sales of 4,000 to Taywood's 2,000 immediately elevated Taylor Woodrow to one of the United Kingdom's top five housebuilders. Taywood's housing was relocated to Bryant's Birmingham office, and rebranded under the Bryant name. Two years later, the housing business was again enlarged, this time by the acquisition of Wilson Connolly, taking output to approaching 10,000 units per year.

=== Merger with George Wimpey ===
In March 2007, the company announced plans for a £6 billion nil premium merger with long term rival construction company George Wimpey. The merger was effected by means of a scheme of arrangement, leaving the original Taylor Woodrow shareholders with 51% of the new Taylor Wimpey. Taylor Woodrow provided the new chairman and finance director, while the chief executive and the United Kingdom managing director came from Wimpey.

=== Taylor Woodrow Construction ===
In September 2008, Vinci plc, the British subsidiary of France's Vinci SA, acquired Taylor Woodrow Construction from Taylor Wimpey in exchange for £74m. Some aspects of the company, including the rights to its logo, were not included in the sale. Presently, Taylor Woodrow Construction is a UK-based civil engineering contractor, one of four operating divisions of Vinci Construction UK. The business was launched in 2011, combining civil engineering operations from the former Taylor Woodrow group and from Vinci UK – formerly Norwest Holst.

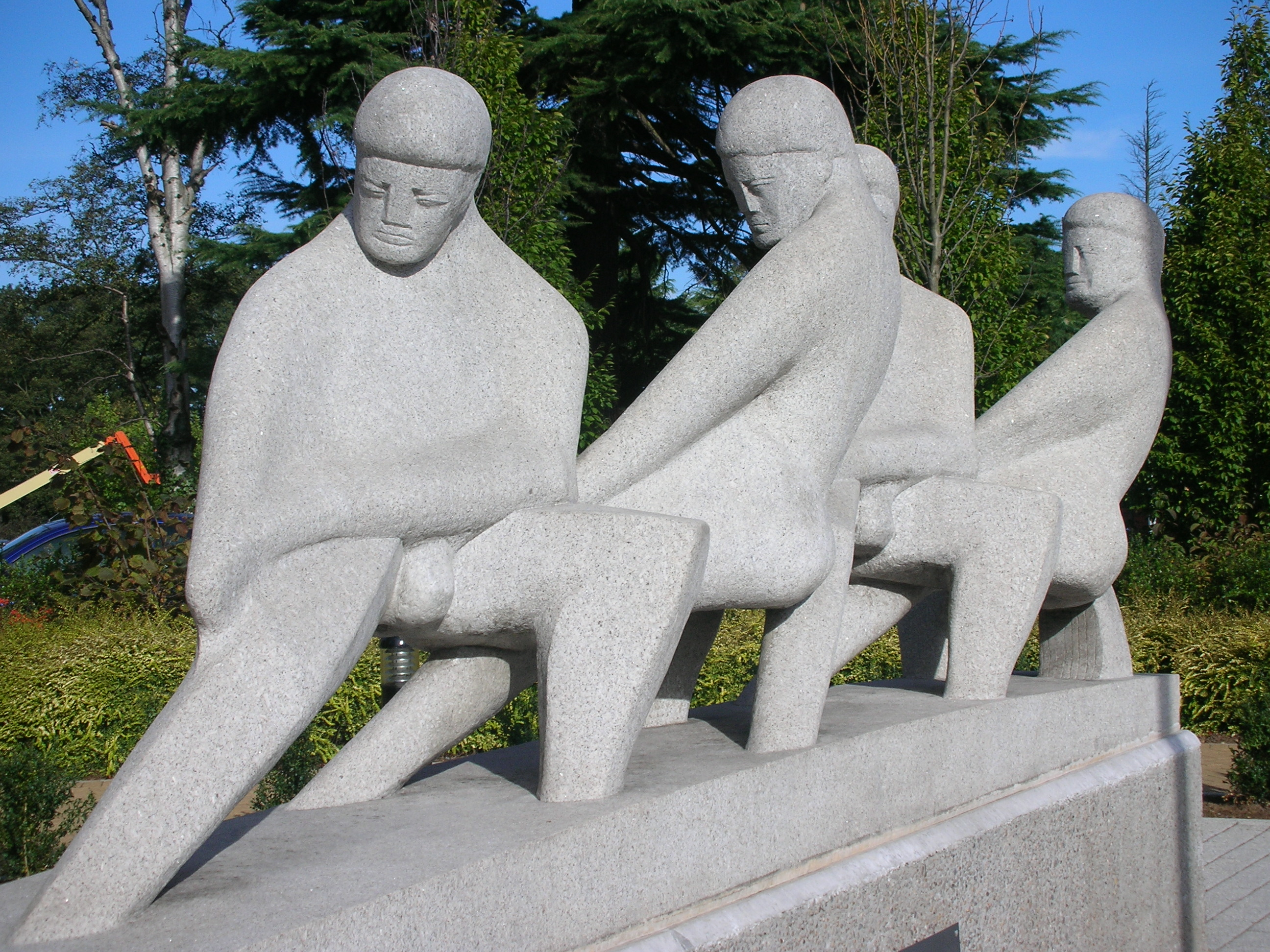
Teamwork by David Wynne, 1956, outside the Solihull office
