= BSA =

BSA may refer to:

== Businesses and organizations ==
- Basketball South Africa
- Bearing Specialists Association, an American trade association
- Belarusian Socialist Assembly
- Bibliographical Society of America
- Birmingham Small Arms Company, UK manufacturer of firearms and vehicles
- Black Sky Aerospace, an Australian company
- Black Socialists in America
- Boston Society of Architects
- Botanical Society of America
- Boy Scouts of America
  - Scouts BSA, the flagship program
- British Sandwich & Food to Go Association
- British Science Association
- British Social Attitudes Survey
- British Sociological Association
- British Speleological Association
- British Stammering Association
- Broadcasting Service Association, the former name of the Australian radio network Macquarie Media
- Broadcasting Standards Authority, New Zealand
- BSA Company, motorcycle manufacturer
- BSA Manufacturing, a Malaysian manufacturer of aluminum alloy wheels
- BSA motorcycles, made by the Birmingham Small Arms Company
- Building Societies Association, British trade association
- Business Services Association, of UK service providers
- Software Alliance, a trade group established by Microsoft and formerly called Business Software Alliance

=== Schools ===
- Baltimore School for the Arts
- Birmingham School of Acting
- British School at Athens

== Science and medicine ==
- Behavioral systems analysis
- Bis(trimethylsilyl)acetamide
- Body surface area
- Bovine serum albumin
- Broad-spectrum antiviral drug

== Other uses ==
- Bank Secrecy Act, US
- Bilateral Security Agreement, US umbrella for military cooperation
- Bosnian Serb Army, the Army of Republika Srpska, the former armed forces of the Republika Srpska
- Bachelor of Science and Arts (BSA)
- Bachelor of Science in Accountancy (BSA)
- Bachelor of Science in Agriculture (B.S.A.)
- Bosaso Airport, an airport in Puntland (IATA airport code BSA)
- British Soap Awards, an awards ceremony in the UK
- BSA, a brand of bicycles produced by Tube Investments of India
- Business systems analyst
- Blue Dragon Series Awards, an annual award ceremony in South Korea
- Bharatiya Sakshya Act, 2023, Indian evidence act
