= Interserve =

UK construction and support services business

Interserve Group Ltd
- The Interserve "Hydra" logo.
- Type: Limited company
- Industry: Infrastructure - professional services, construction services, construction equipment hire and sale
- Predecessor: Interserve plc Tilbury Douglas plc Tilbury Group plc R M Douglas Holdings
- Founded: 1884
- Headquarters: Reading, Berkshire, United Kingdom
- Area served: Worldwide
- Key people: Alan Lovell, Chairman
- Products: Formwork Systems, Joinery products
- Revenue: £2,241.7 million (2019)
- Operating income: £(56.0) million (2019)
- Net income: £(46.9) million (2019)
- Number of employees: 34,721 (2019)
- Subsidiaries: see Operations

Interserve was a British construction and support services business based in Reading, Berkshire, which went into administration in 2019 and was formally wound up in 2022. In 2019 the group generated revenue of £2.2 billion and had a workforce of 34,721 people.

The company was founded in 1884 as the London and Tilbury Lighterage Company Limited. From 1991, it was known as Tilbury Douglas following a merger with RM Douglas, but in 2001 it rebranded as Interserve plc. The name change partly reflected a shift in focus during the 1990s towards maintenance and facilities management services sectors, and this continued in the 2000s, buoyed by further acquisitions.

However, financial issues including problem contracts in Interserve's energy-from-waste business led to profit warnings in 2017. The company was forced to restructure and refinance in March 2018. After its financial situation worsened in late 2018, debt holders discussed further financial restructuring of the business. A debt-for-equity plan was rejected in March 2019, and Interserve plc went into administration owing creditors over £100m. In a pre-pack deal, the rest of the group was immediately sold to a newly incorporated company owned by lenders, Interserve Group Ltd, and a break-up of the company followed. Interserve's facilities management business was sold to Mitie in December 2020, and RMD Kwikform was sold in October 2021 to France's Altrad.

In March 2021, Interserve resurrected the Tilbury Douglas brand for its construction and engineering services businesses. Interserve plc was formally wound-up in the High Court in January 2022. In June 2022, Tilbury Douglas fully separated from Interserve Group and became a standalone construction contracting company. Some smaller assets are expected to be sold before Interserve Group is finally shut down in 2024. In October 2022, Interserve was fined £4.4 million for a breach of data protection law in May 2020.

== History ==
=== Maritime origins – 1880s–1945 ===
Interserve could trace its origins to 1884, when the London and Tilbury Lighterage Company Limited was formed to transfer goods by sailing barge to and from ships on the River Thames, London, England. In 1888 the company expanded into dredging, securing a contract with the Port of London (PLA) to remove dredged ballast. The company changed its name several times, eventually operating for 56 years as Tilbury Contracting and Dredging Company Limited (TCDC) from 1908. Several of the company's vessels were requisitioned for war duties during World War I where they took part in various military campaigns including in the Dardanelles, Archangel and the Persian Gulf. Lightering gradually declined due to the increase of road traffic, and dredging became the mainstay of the company. In 1938 the company's lighterage fleet was amalgamated with vessels owned by W H J Alexander Limited and Tate and Lyle Limited to form Silvertown Services Limited and TCDC severed its links with its original business activity.

In World War II, many of the company's fleet of tugs were again requisitioned, controlled by the Royal Navy examination service, where they were used to patrol harbour and river entrances. TCDC tugs and barges were also represented within the merchant marine fleet that took part in Operation Dynamo, commonly known as the Dunkirk evacuation. In June 1944, company tug Danube VI participated in Operation Neptune, the D-Day invasion of Normandy, known as the Normandy landings by towing the 'Phoenix' (mulberry harbour breakwater units) and 'Whale' (floating roadway units that connected the mulberry harbour pier heads to the landing beaches), as well as ammunition barges from Littlehampton across the English Channel to the Normandy beachhead. Company tug Danube V took part in pipelaying activities during July 1944, as part of Operation Pluto, which brought together British scientists, oil companies and the armed forces in the construction of undersea oil pipelines under the English Channel between England and France to transport fuel supplies to Allied forces on the European continent.

=== Post-war civil engineering and contracting – 1945–1990s ===
As the UK sought to rebuild infrastructure after World War II, the company established a civil engineering capability in the 1940s to participate in this activity; together with building these had become the company's focus by the 1960s. In 1964, a Port of London Authority dredging contract ended, 76 years after it was first awarded, and the company ceased to operate as a dredging contractor in the UK. In 1965 the remaining fleet of dredging vessels was sold to Westminster Dredging Company Limited. The company, by then named Tilbury Contracting Group Limited, applied for admission of its shares onto the London Stock Exchange and trading commenced on 12 October 1966.

In 1991 Tilbury acquired RM Douglas, another construction and civil engineering business, the combined business becoming known as Tilbury Douglas. Although both groups had a UK-wide presence, the rationale of the acquisition was that the two companies complemented each other. Tilbury Group was headquartered in Reading and predominantly involved in building work in the South of England and in Scotland, while R M Douglas was headquartered in Birmingham and its strongest regional presence was in the Midlands and the North of England with a strong bias towards civil engineering projects. In common with many major national and regional contractors in the post-war period, R M Douglas successfully bid for work in the construction of airfields and motorways where it completed various UK motorway building projects in the 1960s, 1970s and 1980s.

The acquisition of Douglas also brought with it the construction equipment company Rapid Metal Developments (RMD) a formwork and falsework manufacturer incorporated in 1948, together with joint ventures in Oman (Douglas OHI) and United Arab Emirates (Khansaheb), both of which were initially established by Douglas in 1981. This expanded the geographical coverage of the company to the Middle East and this presence was further strengthened by the establishment of a joint venture in Qatar (Gulf Contracting Company).

A series of acquisitions and disposals in the late 1990s and 2000 moved the group's focus away from property development and housebuilding, as it sought to build presence in the maintenance and facilities management sectors, though it retained a strong presence in traditional construction contracting. Acquisitions included electrical engineering contractor J R Williams in 1997, the facilities management and engineering services business How Group purchased for £46m in 1998, the £75m takeover of industrial and equipment services specialist Bandt Group in 1999 and, in a £75m purchase, facilities management company Building and Property, responsible for providing accommodation and property services to government departments.

During this period the company disposed of its Scottish housebuilding business to Persimmon plc, diminishing the significance of revenues from traditional construction contracting workstreams, with the newly diversified group now earning significant revenue through its facilities management and maintenance capability, which are otherwise known as support services provision. To reflect this change in the company's business profile, it successfully applied in 2000 to the London Stock Exchange to relinquish its listing within the construction sector of the market, but to re-list within the support services sector on the FTSE market list. To reflect this change it renamed itself Interserve in 2001.

=== Interserve expansion – 2000s ===
On 2 May 2006 Interserve acquired MacLellan, another support services business for £118m. After re-structuring to accommodate the acquisition, Interserve announced it had discovered accounting irregularities in its Industrial Services business - an announcement that saw its share price fall by 14%. This decline led to threats of legal action by former MacLellan shareholders, who had accepted shares in Interserve as part of the acquisition and saw the value of their holdings dramatically drop. The company was also forced to delay the official publication of its interim results to investors, so as "to verify the adjustment needed" as it sought to reconcile the misstatements.

In 2007 the group acquired a 49% stake in the Qatar-based Madina Group. In 2008 Interserve expanded into markets in Abu Dhabi and Northern Europe.

=== Further acquisition activity – 2010s ===
Interserve announced in November 2010 that it had acquired the US formwork and shoring business CMC Construction Services in a deal worth £22 million. On 25 February 2011 the company emerged as a bidder for fellow support services provider, Mouchel, as Interserve aimed to "target the rapidly growing market for fully integrated outsourcing services." Interserve had approached the target with an offer believed to be in the region of £191m, or 170p per share; Mouchel had previously rejected two bids from Costain. However, after conducting due diligence on the consulting group, Interserve reduced its indicative offer to a reported £151m, or 135p per share, and this was subsequently rejected. Interserve did not progress the bid and no formal offer was tabled.

On 4 May 2012 the company acquired "Welfare-to-work" provider Business Employment Services Training (BEST), a UK provider of training and development for job-seekers and employers. Then on 12 October 2012 Interserve announced that it had sold its stakes in some UK private finance initiative hospitals, schools and prisons for £90m. Dalmore Capital Fund, a UK infrastructure fund, agreed to buy 19 of the PFI investments, which generated £4.6m profits for the group in 2011. The Financial Times reported the sale as including "the stakes are five in hospitals – including University College London, Carlisle and Newcastle – five in schools, two in prisons and several in defence establishments." On 18 December 2012 it was announced that the company had acquired Advantage Healthcare, a leading UK provider of healthcare at home services for £26.5m in cash. Then on 7 January 2013 the organisation announced the acquisition of The Oman Construction Company for a cash consideration of $34.1m.

On 28 February 2014, the company acquired Initial Facilities from Rentokil Initial for £250m. In October 2014, Interserve benefitted from the UK Government's privatisation of the probation sector, securing contracts to run criminal justice services in five areas.

=== Financial difficulties – 2017-2019 ===
On 14 September 2017, Interserve reported additional costs associated with quitting the energy-from-waste (EfW) sector. In February 2017, these costs were revised from £70m to £160m; in September 2017, the figure had risen "significantly" but no new estimate was given (in March 2018, the developer of a Glasgow EfW plant said it was in "ongoing" discussions with Interserve after costs rose by £95m to £250m, with Viridor contractually entitled to recover incremental costs from Interserve.) The company's lenders, including HSBC and Royal Bank of Scotland, called in accountants EY to advise, while the company appointed a new finance director, Mark Whiteling, to work alongside Debbie White, CEO from 1 September 2017. On 19 October, the firm was reported to be "battling for survival" after warning it would breach bank loan covenants; shares slumped 38% to 55p, valuing the company at just £80m, before recovering to close at 65p.

On 20 October 2017, the company was awarded a £227 million contract to provide facilities management services to the Department for Work and Pensions. On 13 November, Interserve was set to axe 200 jobs in a cost-cutting drive, with further job losses expected.

On 14 December 2017, it was reported that Interserve had secured £180m in short-term funding from its banks and had pushed back the test date for compliance with loan covenants to March 2018. Interserve also appointed a rescue specialist, Scott Millar, as chief restructuring officer. On 10 January 2018, Interserve warned that its debt was set to rise above £513m at the year-end due to redundancy costs and cash outflows from its legacy EfW projects. Following the January 2018 collapse of Carillion, the Financial Times said Interserve was being monitored by the UK Government; the report led to a 15% drop in Interserve's share price, later largely recouped - a market analyst said: "in the case of Interserve the arithmetic doesn't look anything like as bad as Carillion". Market uncertainty following Carillion's liquidation continued, partly fuelled by a 30 January profits warning by Capita, after which Interserve's share price dropped nearly 20%.

On 12 February 2018, accountancy firm Deloitte was drafted in advise ministers on public sector contracts held by Interserve. On 21 February, Interserve announced it was closing its power lines business, putting over 70 staff at risk of redundancy. Three days later, Interserve was said to be struggling to agree a debt refinancing deal because Carillion's liquidation had spooked lenders; Interserve denied the talks had stumbled. On 26 February, Interserve's share price fell 12% to close at 57p. On 3 March, Emerald Investment Partners, the family firm of Punch Taverns founder Alan McIntosh, acquired £140m of Interserve debts on secondary markets in a bid to save the company. Interserve was reported to have cut 500 administrative staff in the last quarter and to be planning a further 1,000 job losses by the end of 2018. On 8 March, a series of equity swap deals bolstered Interserve's share price; the following day Interserve put its stake in the £200m Haymarket development in Edinburgh up for sale to help reduce its near £600m debts.

==== 2018 financial restructuring ====
On 21 March 2018 Interserve announced it had agreed commercial terms with its main bankers for extra cash facilities of £197m and fresh bonding facilities up to £95m. Lenders agreed a further 30-day extension for completion of the refinancing paperwork (concluded on 27 April). The refinancing news drove shares up almost 26% to 87.9p. However, the share price tumbled 13% in early trading on 30 April after Interserve reported a £244m loss for 2017, with debts almost doubled from £274m to £502.6m; analysts anticipated a possible sell-off of Interserve's international support services and construction divisions. On 11 May, Interserve said it would be investigated by the Financial Conduct Authority with regard to handling of inside information and market disclosures regarding its EfW business. On 31 May, the operator of the Glasgow EfW scheme claimed Interserve owed £69m in additional costs; in November 2018, Viridor said it expected to receive at least £64m from Interserve.

Interserve reported its half-year results on 7 August 2018. These showed a pre-tax loss of £6m, said 470 jobs were lost, and showed revenue dipping to £1,488m from £1,647m. Legacy EfW contracts dragged results down, but Interserve aimed to complete and hand over problem EfW contracts by the end of 2018 (in January 2019, New Civil Engineer reported that handover would happen in the first half of 2019). The business suffered a £6.6m loss from exiting the London construction business, and incurred £10.8m in restructuring costs and £32.1m in 'professional adviser fees' in connection with its refinancing. Net debt at 30 June was £614.3m, with Interserve expected to pay £80m in interest costs in 2018.

On 13 November 2018, concerns about an EfW project in Derby led to a 30% slide to a 34-year low (29p) in Interserve's share price, though it later ended down just 10% on the day. A critic blamed its problems on ill-timed acquisitions, expansion into areas (probation, healthcare, EfW) where it had no experience, and a weak balance sheet (of £427.4m intangibles on its balance sheet, £372.9m was goodwill). In a 23 November trading update, CEO Debbie White said the group would unveil plans to tackle its debt mountain in early 2019 after revealing year-end net debt would be worse than expected, up to £625m-£650m due to additional cash outflows on EfW projects and slow payments in Middle Eastern markets. The news pushed down shares 9% (closing at 33p), and there was further pressure on 26 November when West Yorkshire Police said it would be seeking compensation for faults in construction of custody suites in Leeds and Wakefield. Interserve shares closed on 30 November down 6.5% at 28p. The share price slide continued into December (closing at 21p on 4 December), after, in Building, Specialist Engineering Contractors Group CEO Rudi Klein advised members not to work for Interserve if possible.

==== Failed 2019 financial restructuring ====
On 7 December 2018, Interserve was reported - for the second time in 2018 - to be in rescue refinancing talks, with banks and other debt holders (including RBS, HSBC, BNP Paribas, Emerald Asset Management and Davidson Kempner Capital) preparing to incur losses in a debt-for-equity swap that would see public shareholders virtually wiped out. On 10 December, Interserve confirmed its deleveraging plan could result in "material dilution" for current Interserve shareholders; shares dived, eventually closing 53% down at 11.5p. Fearing problems similar to those faced by clients after Carillion collapsed, the Labour Party urged the Government to bar Interserve from bidding for public contracts, but the Cabinet Office insisted Interserve was different from Carillion. Meanwhile, Interserve announced a £25m contract win at a Welsh hospital.

Restructuring options included spinning off the £250m building materials unit RMD Kwikform to lenders, leaving the remainder of Interserve as a more focused support services business. The core principles of the deleveraging plan were reported to have been conditionally agreed between Interserve and its lenders on 21 December 2018, but negotiations continued through January 2019, with the deal, excluding sale of RMD Kwikform, reported to be close to announcement on 3 February. The Cabinet Office reportedly objected to any deal involving selling RMD Kwikform, believing this would render the remainder of the business almost worthless, making it difficult to continue awarding contracts to the company.

On 6 February, Interserve announced it had agreed a deleveraging deal with its lenders: it planned to raise £480m through a new share issue (accounting for 97.5% of the total issued share capital), reducing debts from over £600m to £275m, and retaining RMD Kwikform in the group. The plan was subject to approval by Interserve's shareholders, but Interserve was "actively preparing alternative plans" in case that approval was not given; administration remained a possibility. One major shareholder, hedge fund Coltrane Asset Management, while supportive of the CEO, requisitioned an extraordinary general meeting (EGM) calling for the removal of eight other directors; another shareholder, Farringdon Capital Management, also voiced opposition to the proposed rescue plan. On 14 February, it was reported that blocking the deleveraging plan and removing key board members could trigger an immediate £66m repayment to lenders, weakening Interserve's financial position still further. On 20 February, Coltrane had grown its stake and now held 27.7% of Interserve's voting rights through publicly traded shares. In view of shareholders' opposition, on 22 February lenders were reported to be amending the debt-for-equity proposals so that existing shareholders would own 5% of Interserve. However, an alternative Coltrane proposal (retaining a 10% equity share for shareholders) had also been put to Interserve, while EY had been put on standby to act as administrator. The proposals were to be subject to an EGM vote on 26 March, later brought forward to an AGM vote on 15 March.

On 27 February, Interserve announced its financial results for the year to 31 December 2018, recording a pre-tax loss of £111.5m on a turnover of £2904m (down 10.7% due to a drop in UK construction activity and tighter bidding criteria). Net debt increased to £631.2m, and the company warned: "successful implementation of the Deleveraging Plan is critical to our future." Professional fees for the 2018 refinancing totalled £43m with a further £33m set to be paid in connection with the deleveraging plan. A further £12.6m in losses on problem EfW contracts brought the total loss to date to £229.2m.

Coltrane remained opposed to the deleveraging plan, angered by expenditure on the plans and by directors' reluctance to invest in new shares. Interserve's £90m expenditure on fees (to investment bank Rothschild investment bank, broker Numis, lawyers Ashurst LLP and Slaughter and May, accountant Grant Thornton and PR firm Tulchan) was said to be equivalent to the cash the firm would have if its restructuring plan was successful with shareholders. Coltrane called the sell-off to fund debts "an obscenity," and, on 4 March, submitted a revised financial rescue plan (giving 55% of the company to creditors, leaving shareholders with 37.5%) and told directors to stop advocating rival proposals put forward by the company's lenders (Coltrane later threatened legal action against Interserve's directors to hold them personally accountable for the company's losses). However, the Interserve board rejected this proposal, while lenders lined up a precautionary 'pre-pack administration' that would wipe out existing shareholders but keep Interserve operating if the deleveraging plan was not approved.

On 11 March, lenders tried a last-ditch effort to win shareholder support by increasing the amount of equity retained by shareholders to 7.5%, but this was not backed by Interserve's board which urged support for the deleveraging plan offering shareholders 5%. Coltrane warned Interserve's prospective administrator against arranging a pre-pack insolvency deal, demanding rigorous and comprehensive marketing, and holding out the prospect that Coltrane might acquire the company from the insolvency process.

=== Administration – 2019–2022 ===
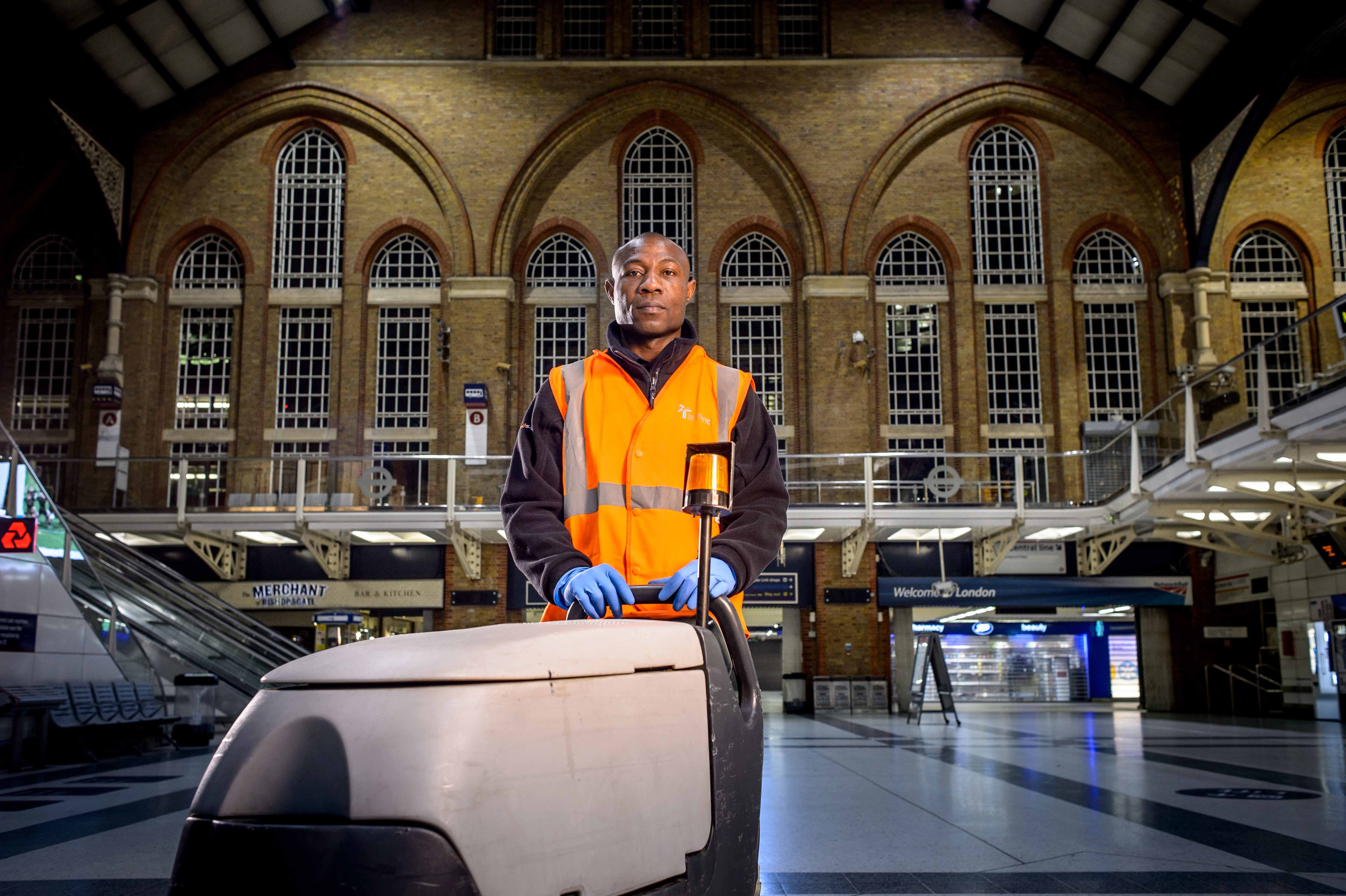
Until December 2020, Interserve provided a range of support services across the transport sector.

At the 15 March AGM, the deleveraging plan was rejected by shareholders, and trading in the company's shares was suspended. Interserve's board confirmed it had applied for the parent company to be placed into administration, and said it was pursuing the pre-pack option. The board later announced the group had been sold to a new company, to be called Interserve Group Ltd, controlled by Interserve's existing lenders.

The administration and pre-pack process meant banks wrote off up to £800m in loans, while Coltrane, Farringdon and around 16,000 small shareholders all lost their investments. Unions and others expressed concern about the government's continued awarding of contracts to Interserve during its financial troubles, but a Cabinet Office spokesperson said its processes and financial check had been robust, adding: "The refinancing process that Interserve executed led to the smooth continuation of public services and safeguarded thousands of jobs." However, around 200 firms that provided IT, HR and property management services to Interserve plc risked not being paid. EfW client Viridor repeated its claim that, despite the administration, the still operating Interserve Construction owed £64m for work on its Glasgow plant; in November 2019, Viridor issued arbitration proceedings to reclaim £72m. In June 2019, it was reported that Interserve had collapsed owing creditors over £100m.

Rival outsourcing firms including Mitie, Serco and Sodexo were reported to be considering bids to acquire Interserve's core support services business, valued by lenders at around £300m. Mitie was repeatedly reported to be considering a bid of about £100m for the support services arm, which employs about 40,000 of the Interserve group's 45,000-strong UK workforce.

In April 2019, the Financial Reporting Council launched an investigation into auditor Grant Thornton's work on Interserve's financial statements for the years 2015, 2016 and 2017 (Grant Thornton and the partner involved were fined £1.3m by the FRC in 2021 for 'scepticism failure'). Interserve announced that Mark Whiteling, chief financial officer since September 2017, would be leaving the company; and a dispute with Sandwell MBC over allegedly defective Interserve-built school buildings was reported. In June 2019, chairman Glyn Barker was reported to be preparing to step down, with Alan Lovell named as his successor in July 2019.

In July 2019, Interserve's partner on the Derby EfW project, Renewi, said it was resigned to having its contract terminated, with the plant's handover more than two years late. Renewi said it had a £11.6m claim against Interserve. Derbyshire and Derby City Council said they were preparing to cancel the £950m waste management contract, which was formally terminated in early August 2019. The councils later (November 2021) considered scrapping the facility.

In November 2019, Interserve announced an operational restructuring of the business; as a result, CEO Debbie White would leave the business, with CFO Mark Morris assuming some of her responsibilities. A City analyst said that the restructuring "looks like a precursor to the future splitting up the group." In March 2020, auditors red-flagged Interserve's finances as the company planned to break up its businesses.

In April 2020, the period of administration of Interserve plc was extended. Disposal of Interserve plc's 49% stake (valued in 2018 at £2.7m) in a Qatari business was delayed due to the COVID-19 pandemic restrictions in Qatar, so administrator EY was granted a two-year extension until March 2022. EY said secured creditors of Interserve plc, owed around £65.2m, were not expected to receive any payout from the administration.

==== Group break-up ====
In June 2020, Mitie announced it was to buy Interserve's 40,000-strong facilities management business in a cash and shares deal initially worth £271m, later valued at £190m (£120m in cash and a 17.5% shareholding in Mitie). The deal, cleared by competition authorities in November 2020, had to be ratified by Mitie's shareholders and was expected to be completed by the end of November 2020, leaving Interserve focused on three remaining divisions: Interserve Construction, RMD Kwikform, and its Citizen Services group of businesses. The acquisition was confirmed as completed on 1 December 2020.

On 2 March 2021, Interserve announced it was rebranding its construction and engineering services businesses, resurrecting the Tilbury Douglas name. Its Citizen Services business, providing community rehabilitation services in five UK areas, was renationalised by the Ministry of Justice on 24 June 2021 as part of the UK Government’s new model of probation delivery. On 6 October 2021, it was reported that RMD Kwikform was set to be sold to France's Altrad group for over £140m - a sale confirmed the following day.

In January 2022, Kier Group was reported to be in advanced talks to acquire Tilbury Douglas, with speculation Kier might pay around £50m for the almost-£500m turnover contractor. However, Kier discontinued negotiations in March 2022.

Interserve plc was officially wound up at the High Court on 21 January 2022, closing the administration process, though some outstanding issues relating to Interserve plc's stake in a Qatari business remained to be resolved, as did calculation of how much the company owed to HMRC. The former administrator, EY-Parthenon, was to continue work on these issues. During administration, debt of £815m and over £200m in other liabilities was wiped out by stakeholders in exchange for equity in Interserve Group Limited. Secured creditors would get no further cash from Interserve plc.

In June 2022, Tilbury Douglas fully separated from Interserve Group and became a standalone construction contracting company owned by Interserve banks. Managing director Paul Gandy said the business had delivered more than £500m of projects in 2021, and its order-book totalled over £1bn. In the year to December 2019, it had a turnover of £480m but reported a £95m pre-tax loss. Tilbury Douglas was the last major part of Interserve Group; some smaller assets are expected to be sold before Interserve is finally shut down in 2024.

Interserve's accounts for the 18 months to June 2021 showed company revenue of £2.1bn during the period and a pre-tax loss of £309m.

== Operations ==
In December 2020, Interserve was predominantly a construction group, offering advice, design, construction and equipment services for infrastructure in the United Kingdom and worldwide. Following the December 2020 sale of its FM operations to Mitie, Interserve was focused on three remaining divisions: Interserve Construction, RMD Kwikform, and the Citizen Services group of businesses. In March 2021, the construction business was renamed Tilbury Douglas; Citizen Services was renationalised in June 2021, and RMD Kwikform was sold four months later.

== Financial information ==
Financial information for the company is as follows:

=== Annual results ===
	Revenue (£ million)	Profit/(loss) before tax (£m)	Net profit/(loss) (£m)	Earnings per share (p)
31 Dec 2019	2,241.7	(46.9)	(56.0)	–
31 Dec 2018	2,697.5	(111.3)	(128.9)	(89.2)
31 Dec 2017	3,250.8	(244.4)	(254.4)	(176.0)
31 Dec 2016	3,244.6	(94.1)	(101.6)	(71.2)
31 Dec 2015	3,204.6	79.5	70.2	67.9
31 Dec 2014	3,305.3	106.2	49.9	32.2
31 Dec 2013	2,192.6	68.1	55.0	47.7
31 Dec 2012	2,369.6	184.9	171.7	129.3
31 Dec 2011	2,319.6	68.1	60.6	44.7
31 Dec 2010	2,315.4	68.9	53.5	38.5
31 Dec 2009	1,906.8	96.6	72.4	53.7
31 Dec 2008	1,800.0	82.7	57.7	42.7
31 Dec 2007	1,738.0	69.2	49.4	36.9
31 Dec 2006	1,408.5	13.2	1.1	(1.3)
31 Dec 2005^{[a]}	1,214.5	37.2	24.3	18.9
31 Dec 2004^{[a]}	1,223.0	14.6	11.6	14.1
31 Dec 2003	1,211.1	22.5	(7.3)	(7.0)
31 Dec 2002	1,122.9	39.9	24.6	21.6
31 Dec 2001	1,250.3	44.8	27.2	23.9
31 Dec 2000	929.3	39.1	23.7	23.0

[a]: Restated to correct accounting misstatement in Industrial Services division. Included for comparison.

=== Net asset value ===
Interserve Net Asset Value
Year	Million Pounds Sterling
2019	108.4
2018	(1.1)
2017	62.6
2016	355.1
2015	512.6
2014	479.6
2013	370.3
2012	330.8
2011	300.8
2010	257.6
2009	221.7
2008	232.3
2007	183.2
2006	121.9
2005^{[a]}	94.2
2004^{[a]}	74.7
2003^{[a]}	72.6
2002^{[a]}	78.5
2001^{[a]}	75.5
2000^{[a]}	68.8

[a]: Restated to comply with IAS 19, IFRS 3, IAS 10, IAS 39 and IAS12

== Corporate social responsibility (CSR) ==
Interserve was a constituent of the FTSE4Good Index, designed to objectively measure the performance of companies that meet globally recognised corporate responsibility standards.

=== CSR history ===
From 2002, the company published a corporate social responsibility report section, as a means of social accounting, within its Annual Report and Financial Results.

The Observer’s "Good Companies Guide" 2008, compiled to establish Britain's most ethical companies ranked Interserve in its top 20 out of all companies listed on the FTSE 350 Index.

In 2012 Interserve established the Interserve Employee Foundation, a registered charity, which as noted in the British Quality Foundation Achievement Award 2012 citation, aimed to "improve the quality of life and life chances for people in the community where they live and operate by utilising the skills, capabilities, resources and enthusiasm of Interserve's employees."

It was announced on 25 March 2013 that Interserve was to establish an Integrated reporting accounting system, a series of metrics that are designed to measure more than financial performance, by contributing not only towards financial stability, but also sustainable economic development. The company joined the International Integrated Reporting Council worldwide pilot programme, comprising 85 companies, which sought to develop a reporting system that communicates how an organisation's strategy, governance, performance and prospects lead to the creation of value over the short, medium and long term. Interserve developed a plan, ‘SustainAbilities’, in conjunction with sustainability adviser, environmentalist and writer Tony Juniper, co-founder of The Robertsbridge Group, that would measure the company's performance against its knowledge, natural and social capital, in addition to its financial capital.

=== Accreditations ===
Interserve was accredited with compliance to the following International Organization for Standardization (ISO) standards:

- ISO 9001 - Quality Management - deals with the requirements that organisations have to comply with to meet the fundamentals of quality management systems, including the eight management principles on which the family of standards is based.
- ISO 14001 - Environmental Management - is a standard that sets out the criteria that organisations processes are required to achieve in order to; (a) minimize how their operations (processes etc.) negatively affect the environment (i.e. cause adverse changes to air, water, or land); (b) comply with applicable laws, regulations, and other environmentally oriented requirements, and (c) continually improve in the above.
- OHSAS 18001 - Occupational Health and Safety (OH&S) - is an international standard for occupational health and safety management systems. It specifies the requirements for an organisations OH&S management system that documents through a transparent process its policy and objectives, to take into account legal requirements and information about OH&S risks.

=== Awards ===
Interserve received various business and industry awards:

- Royal Society for the Prevention of Accidents (RoSPA) – President's Award
- Interserve Construction 2012, 2011, 2010,
- Interserve Engineering Services 2012, 2011,
- Interserve Defence 2009, 2008, 2007, 2006,
- Interserve Industrial Services 2005, 2004,
- British Quality Foundation UK Excellence Award 2012 - Interserve Construction
- The Queen's Award for Enterprise 2010 - RMD Kwikform
- The British Safety Council – International Safety Award 2013 – Distinction – Interserve Industrial Services Limited

== Corporate lobbying ==
Interserve was a member of Constructing Excellence, The Business Services Association and Build UK.

== Controversies ==
=== Accounting irregularities ===
On 14 August 2006 the company announced to the London Stock Exchange that accounting issues relating to the mis-statement of accounting balances within its former Industrial Services Division had been uncovered. The discovery of these accounting irregularities led to a write down in profits by £25.9m, including prior years (see section 3 Financial Information), and six senior managers were suspended with the company stating that accounting mis-statements dating back "several years" had been uncovered following changes in the organisation. The Daily Telegraph reported that 'an investigation had discovered that controls in the division involving work in progress were, in the words of Lord Blackwell, chairman, "repeatedly evaded over several years in what appears to have been a concerted effort by certain divisional managers to over-state divisional results." He added that the board was concerned that the deliberate nature of the evasions had gone undetected for so long despite internal and external audit scrutiny.'

=== Office of Fair Trading investigation ===
It was announced that in April 2008 the company became subject to an investigation by the Office of Fair Trading (OFT) under the terms of the Competition Act. The investigation was described by the OFT as "one of the largest ever Competition Act investigations" and a total of 112 firms in the construction sector in England were implicated. On 22 September 2009 the OFT concluded that Interserve subsidiary Interserve Project Services Limited had engaged in illegal anti-competitive bid-rigging activities and imposed a fine of £11,634,750.

=== Alleged blacklisting ===
A case was brought by three claimants who were scaffolders and shop stewards, against subsidiary company Interserve Industrial Services Limited (IIS) at an Employment Tribunal. IIS and the claimants trade union, UNITE, were party to a collective agreement that provided for the company to "undertake as far as is practicable to place onto an appropriate contract an NECC accredited senior steward". A union representative therefore contacted a manager for the company and advocated the employment of the claimants on a contract awarded to IIS. The manager decided on the basis of the contact with the union representative not to recruit any of the three claimants. The claimants contended that a deliberate decision had been made not to recruit them because of their union activities and that their names had been blacklisted by the company. The Tribunal ruling supported the IIS evidence that the union tried to bully the company's manager into employing the three men, acted in a combative manner which was resented and that the company did not want to be dictated to about whom to employ. The judgement was subject to an Employment Appeal Tribunal where the ruling was upheld in Interserve's favour.

=== Late payment ===
In April 2019, Interserve Construction was suspended from the UK Government's Prompt Payment Code for failing to pay suppliers on time. It was reinstated in November 2019.

=== ICO fine for 2020 data breach ===
In October 2022, Interserve was fined £4.4 million for a breach of data protection law that occurred in May 2020. This breach enabled opportunist hackers to gain access to data belonging to up to 113,000 Interserve employees. Although malware was downloaded and executed by an employee in response to a phishing email, and was detected by Interserve's antivirus software, the Information Commissioner's Office found that Interserve failed to thoroughly investigate the suspicious activity. Interserve had received a notification that their antivirus software had detected and removed the malicious software downloaded by the employee. However, the attackers still had access to the employee's account, which allowed them to move laterally onto other systems by exploiting vulnerabilities, exacerbated by Interserve's use of obsolete and unsupported software. As a result of Interserve's negligence, the attackers were able to compromise 283 systems and 16 accounts, uninstall the company's antivirus solution, and deploy ransomware encrypting the personal data of both current and former employees. Interserve disputed claims that its staff and response had been complacent, stating that it had also taken steps to reduce risks in systems supporting ongoing operations at Tilbury Douglas and in the facilities management business acquired by Mitie Group. Nonetheless, the fine imposed on Interserve was the fourth-largest ever demanded by the Information Commissioner's Office (ICO).

As part of the resulting investigation, the Information Commissioner's Office discovered a number of serious breaches of data protection, which were also in breach of Interserve's own documented policies:

- Use of obsolete server operating systems: Interserve was processing personal data on 18 servers running Windows Server 2003 R2, an Operating System that ended mainstream support on 13 July 2010, and 22 servers running Windows Server 2008 R2 with mainstream support ending on 13 January 2015. Interserve also ran out of date Antivirus Protection on these servers, limited vulnerability scans and provided no evidence of any penetration testing.
- Lack of infosec training: Only one of the two Finance employees who received the phishing email had received any form of information security training.
- Use of obsolete network protocols: Due to the obsolete software being in active use, and a general lack of security hardening processes or standards, Interserve were still using SMB Protocol Version 1, which has been deprecated since June 2013 and contains a number of well documented security vulnerabilities. The use of this protocol alone contributed to a breach of data protection.
- Privileged account management: Interserve had over 280 users in the domain Administrators group. 12 of these users were compromised by the attacker.
- Poor incident response: The attack was not investigated by Interserve's security team on the basis that they had received a notification from the out of date antivirus software that the malicious software had been detected and removed.

In August 2023, Interserve published its latest accounts for the 18 months to June 2021, which showed the company spent £7m on "professional adviser fees" following the attack, taking the total cost of the cyber attack to over £11M.

== Notable projects constructed as Interserve ==
- Westminster Bridge refurbishment (2013), described by Transport for London (TFL) as "revolutionary works to repair the Capital's oldest bridge"; constructed by Interserve Project Services.
- Thames Water Desalination Plant (2009), the first water desalination plant in the United Kingdom, built in Beckton, east London for Thames Water by a consortium of Interserve, Atkins Water and Spanish firm Acciona Agua
