= Altrad RMD Kwikform =

English company

RMD Kwikform
- Industry: Construction
- Founded: 1948
- Headquarters: Aldridge, England
- Area served: Worldwide
- Products: Formwork, Falsework, Scaffolding, Groundshoring
- Number of employees: c.1,200+
- Parent: Altrad Group
- Website: www.rmdkwikform.com

Altrad RMD Kwikform is a company based in Aldridge, England, that hires and sells temporary works and engineering design for building construction and infrastructure projects.

== History ==
The company was formed as Mills Scaffold Company in 1935; it became GKN Kwikform following its acquisition by the British engineering conglomerate GKN in 1983. Under GKN ownership, the company expanded rapidly in the fields of formwork and scaffolding during the late 1980s. In June 2000, GKN Kwikform merged with RMD (Rapid Metal Developments, established in 1948), the formwork and scaffolding unit of RM Douglas (part of Tilbury Douglas); after which the name RMD Kwikform was adopted. Tilbury Douglas renamed itself Interserve in 2001.

Throughout the 2000s, the company spread its operations globally. Major civil engineering works built using RMD Kwikform's equipment included the New Tyne Tunnel (completed in February 2011), the Hong Kong–Zhuhai–Macau Bridge (completed in February 2018), and structures along High Speed 2. In 2004, RMD Kwikform was subject to legal action after its scaffolding had allegedly damaged a church. In 2008, a site mishap involving a scaffolding collapse led to arbitration between the company and Taylor Woodrow Construction.

During the mid-2010s, the division exhibited growing sales and strong financial performance. In 2013, it began the use of 3D visualisation techniques within its customer support activities. In 2015, RMD Kwikform launched its ground shoring range of products, which extended its capabilities to ground works applications.

During 2016, parent company Interserve conducted a strategic review, in which the firm reportedly considered the sale of RMD Kwikform, but chose to retain the division for the time being. By this point, it was the most valuable division of Interserve, generating a healthy operating profit of £54.4 million along with a 23.8 percent margin for 2017.

By December 2018, Interserve had entered into financial difficulties and was reportedly considering various restructuring options, such as the spinning off of RMD Kwikform, then valued at £250 million, to lenders while leaving the remainder of Interserve as a more focused support services business. However, the Cabinet Office reportedly objected to any deal involving RMD Kwikform's sale on the assertion that this would render the remainder of the business almost worthless and thus make it difficult to continue awarding contracts to the company.

In early 2019, Interserve announced an agreement on a deleveraging deal which retained RMD Kwikform in the group, but this plan was rejected by its shareholders on 15 March 2019. That same month, Interserve's board applied for the parent company to be placed into administration, and pursued a pre pack deal. This involved the sale of the group (including RMD Kwikform) to a new company, Interserve Group Limited, that was controlled by Interserve's existing lenders.

In August 2019, Interserve appointed Ken Hanna as a non executive director of its board, and chairman of RMD Kwikform. RMD Kwikform had been the strongest performer in the group; however, results in 2018 showed a 27 percent drop in year-on-year operating profits to £39.6 million while turnover declined to £195.5 million from £229 million. During 2020, RMD Kwikform was subject to a cyberattack; that same year, it was reported that Interserve were examining various options for the sale of RMD Kwikform. In October 2021, it was announced that RMD Kwikform had been sold to France's Altrad group in exchange for in excess of £140 million. Following the acquisition, it was rebranded as Altrad RMD Kwikform.

In 2025, Altrad RMD Kwikform launched its Tubeshor 1370 propping solution, capable of handling axial loads up to 15,000kN, it was claimed to be the largest proprietary ground shoring prop in the world.
