= Debbie White =

Debbie White may refer to:

- Debbie White (netball) (born 1978), New Zealand netball player
- Debbie White (businesswoman) (born 1962), British businesswoman
- Debbie White (bowls), New Zealand international lawn bowler
