= Tilbury Douglas =

British construction business

- Type: Limited company
- Industry: Construction services
- Founded: 1884
- Headquarters: Eastcheap, London, United Kingdom
- Area served: UK
- Key people: Nick Pollard (Chairman); Craig Tatton (Chief Executive)
- Revenue: £600.1m (2025)
- Number of employees: 1,268 (2025)
- Website: Tilbury Douglas

Tilbury Douglas is a British construction business with its head office in London.

The company was originally founded in 1884 as the London and Tilbury Lighterage Company Limited, and retained the Tilbury name until 2001. From 1991 it was known as Tilbury Douglas following a merger with RM Douglas, but in 2001 rebranded as Interserve plc. The name change partly reflected a shift in focus during the 1990s towards maintenance and facilities management services sectors, and this continued in the 2000s, buoyed by further acquisitions.

However, financial issues led to Interserve going into administration in March 2019. In a pre-pack deal, the main operating businesses were immediately sold to a newly incorporated company owned by lenders, Interserve Group Ltd, and a break-up of the company followed. Interserve's facilities management business was sold to Mitie in December 2020, and RMD Kwikform was sold in October 2021 to France's Altrad.

In March 2021, Interserve resurrected the Tilbury Douglas brand for its construction and engineering services businesses, and in June 2022, Tilbury Douglas fully separated from Interserve Group and became a standalone construction contracting company.

== History ==
=== Early history – 1884 to 1930s ===
==== Origins ====
In 1884, the London and Tilbury Lighterage Company Limited was formed to transfer goods by sailing barge to and from ships on the River Thames, London, England. A lighterage is the fee paid for the use of a lighter, a large, open, flat bottomed barge, that could transport goods a short distance in shallow waters. At the time London was the busiest port in the world. Lightering provided a service much in demand in the overcrowded river because of the need to transship goods from ships berthed there and to convey them to the riverside wharves, where the larger open water cargo ships were unable to dock due to their size and draft or, to more efficiently and effectively deal with the number of ships congregating in the river. By 1887 the company is recorded as occupying premises of a former Lloyd's Register Proving House and Chain-Testing Shed and subsequent Police Station at Preston Road, West India Docks.

In 1888 the company expanded into dredging, where mechanisation led to greatly improved productivity, and secured a contract with the Port of London (PLA) to remove dredged ballast. This new venture was complementary to the existing business, utilising the barges already owned by the company, together with their knowledge of the river and its tides. There was a further synergy between lightering and dredging; lightering was necessary where ports were shallow and the draft of a vessel needed to be reduced to facilitate their entry into port, whereas dredging increased the depth of river channels to enable vessels with a larger draft to berth into port. The company's move into dredging therefore protected its commercial interest against the perceived threat to lightering. This can be seen vindicated by the decline in lighterage for dry bulk cargo after the middle of the 20th century, although the eventual decline in lighterage was caused by the adoption of road haulage as the main distribution method when London's docks moved downstream (away from what is now known as Docklands) and shipping adopted containerisation methods. However, for the time being lightering still thrived and the New Zealand-based Ashburton Guardian reported in 1890 that the company was an early pioneer in the transshipment of frozen meat. The newspaper noted that their capabilities for handling this cargo had been highlighted during a trip, organized for delegates at the International Congress on Inland Navigation, to inspect the company's custom built vessels complete with cold chambers that enabled the meat to arrive at Smithfield Market frozen.

==== Name changes and international presence ====
The company changed its name several times over the next few years; in 1896 to The London and Tilbury Lighterage Contracting and Dredging Company Limited, in 1904 to the Tilbury Contracting and Dredging Company Limited, then in 1906 to Tilbury Contracting and Dredging Company (1906) Limited, before In 1908 reverting to Tilbury Contracting and Dredging Company Limited (TCDC), a name it settled on for the following 56 years. These were not the only changes experienced by the business, for the advance of technology meant that the firm's sailing barges were becoming obsolete by the advent of steam tugs, and the Company commissioned the new tugs to be built. As the company grew, so did its profile and it came to be frequently featured in the pages of The Engineer. Mention is made in 1907 of the role played by its dredging craft in widening and deepening the navigation channel of the River Clyde to assist the maiden voyage of RMS Lusitania, then the world's biggest ship. A further example was reported on 9 June 1911 which in an article about major dredging works to the River Loire around the port of Nantes, France, noted that the company "had a special dredger constructed for the purpose". This contract is noteworthy as it comprised, at commencement, a three-year undertaking to form a new river bed to divert the course of the river, as well as removing islands and sand banks. A total of 10 million cubic metres of material was to be dredged as part of these £1 million works. On 9 December 1911 Singaporean newspaper The Weekly Sun reported that TCDC "the well-known dredging contractors of London, have entered into a contract…for the formation of a port known as Port Argentine" involving the dredging of 16 million cubic metres to form an approach channel some 9.5 miles long in the Buenos Aires province. During this period, the company also carried out dredging projects in Canada, Egypt and Denmark.

==== World War I service ====
A number of the company's vessels were requisitioned for war duties during World War I where they took part in various military campaigns including in the Dardanelles, Archangel and the Persian Gulf. Company tug 'Danube' was transferred to Admiralty control and assisted a monitor through the Mediterranean en route to the Rufiji River delta, in present-day Tanzania, in order to destroy the German raider Konigsberg.

==== Exit from lighterage ====
Lightering gradually declined due to the increase of road traffic, and dredging became the mainstay of the company. In addition to its dredging contract with the PLA, TCDC secured many other contracts including, between 1923 and 1927, the deepening and on going maintenance of the depth of the navigation channel and tidal harbour at the Port of Aberdeen 1932 saw the firm begin work on a new harbour at Haifa in British Mandate Territory of Palestine that was completed in 1934. In 1938 the company's lighterage fleet was amalgamated with vessels owned by W H J Alexander Limited and Tate and Lyle Limited to form Silvertown Services Limited and TCDC severed its links with its original business activity.

=== World War II service – 1940 to 1945 ===
As in World War I, many of the company's fleet of tugs were requisitioned for active service during World War II. These initially came under the control of the Royal Navy examination service, where they were used to patrol harbour and river entrances. The role of the examination service crews was to board all merchant ships and trawlers entering ports or rivers, scrutinise their papers and if need be to search these craft for evidence of intent to help the enemy.

==== Operation Dynamo ====
Although the company had disposed of its lighterage fleet, it retained craft for its dredging activities. It was these vessels, its tugs and barges, that were represented within the merchant marine fleet that took part in Operation Dynamo, commonly known as the Dunkirk evacuation during World War II, when in late May and early June 1940 a flotilla of 700 ships and boats assisted in the rescue and repatriation of the British Expeditionary Force (BEF) and French troops. Amongst this fleet of ships and boats was the company's dredger Gallions Reach, originally built in 1936 as a steam hopper, but converted at the outbreak of war to a salvage vessel, this vessel rescued 123 men from the beaches and returned them to England.

==== Operation Neptune ====
On 6 June 1944 company tug Danube VI, under COTUG (Control Tug Operation), participated in Operation Neptune, the D-Day invasion of Normandy, known as the Normandy landings by towing the 'Phoenix' (mulberry harbour breakwater units) and 'Whale' (floating roadway units that connected the mulberry harbour pier heads to the landing beaches), as well as ammunition barges from Littlehampton across the English Channel to the Normandy beachhead.

==== Operation Pluto ====
Company tug Danube V took part in pipelaying activities during July 1944, as part of Operation Pluto, which brought together British scientists, oil companies and the armed forces in the construction of undersea oil pipelines under the English Channel between England and France to transport fuel supplies to Allied forces on the European continent.

=== Post war to stock market listing – 1946 to 1960s ===
As the UK sought to rebuild infrastructure after the Second World War, the company established a civil engineering capability in the 1940s to participate in this activity; together with building these had become the company's focus by the 1960s. In 1964 the Port of London Authority dredging contract ended, 76 years after it was first awarded, and the company ceased to operate as a dredging contractor in the UK. In 1965 the remaining fleet of dredging vessels was sold to Westminster Dredging Company Limited. The company, by then named Tilbury Contracting Group Limited, applied for admission of its shares onto the London Stock Exchange and trading commenced on 12 October 1966.

=== Acquisition of R M Douglas Holdings and expansion into the Middle East – 1990s ===
In 1991 Tilbury acquired RM Douglas, another construction and civil engineering business, the combined business becoming known as Tilbury Douglas. Although both groups had a UK-wide presence, the rationale of the acquisition was that the two companies complemented each other. Tilbury Group was headquartered in Reading and predominantly involved in building work in the South of England and in Scotland, while R M Douglas was headquartered in Birmingham and its strongest regional presence was in the Midlands and the North of England with a strong bias towards civil engineering projects.

In common with many major national and regional contractors in the postwar period, R M Douglas successfully bid for work in the construction of airfields and motorways where it completed various UK motorway building projects in the 1960s, 1970s and 1980s.

The acquisition of Douglas also brought with it the construction equipment company Rapid Metal Developments (RMD) a formwork and falsework manufacturer incorporated in 1948, together with joint ventures in Oman (Douglas OHI) and United Arab Emirates (Khansaheb), both of which were initially established by Douglas in 1981. This expanded the geographical coverage of the company to the Middle East and this presence was further strengthened by the establishment of a joint venture in Qatar (Gulf Contracting Company).

=== Diversification and name change – late 1990s and early 2000s ===
A series of acquisitions and disposals in the late 1990s and 2000 moved the group's focus away from property development and housebuilding, as it sought to build presence in the maintenance and facilities management sectors, though it retained a strong presence in traditional construction contracting. Acquisitions included electrical engineering contractor J R Williams in 1997, the facilities management and engineering services business How Group purchased for £46m in 1998, the £75m takeover of industrial and equipment services specialist Bandt Group in 1999 and, in a £75m purchase, facilities management company Building and Property, responsible for providing accommodation and property services to government departments.

During this period the company disposed of its Scottish housebuilding business to Persimmon plc, diminishing the significance of revenues from traditional construction contracting workstreams, with the newly diversified group now earning significant revenue through its facilities management and maintenance capability, which are otherwise known as support services provision. To reflect this change in the company's business profile, it successfully applied in 2000 to the London Stock Exchange to relinquish its listing within the construction sector of the market, but to re-list within the support services sector on the FTSE market list. To reflect this change it renamed itself Interserve in 2001.

=== The Interserve era – 2001–2022 ===
Interserve expanded through further acquisitions over much of the next two decades. On 2 May 2006, Interserve acquired the competing support services business MacLellan in exchange for £118m. During May 2007, the group acquired a 49% stake in the Qatar-based Madina Group. In 2008, Interserve expanded into markets in Abu Dhabi and Northern Europe. During 2012, the company acquired "Welfare-to-work" provider Business Employment Services Training (BEST), a UK provider of training and development for job-seekers and employers, and Advantage Healthcare, a provider of healthcare at home services. In January 2013, the organisation acquired The Oman Construction Company. In 2014, the company acquired Initial Facilities from Rentokil Initial for £250m, and benefitted from the UK Government's privatisation of the probation sector, securing contracts to run criminal justice services in five areas.

==== Interserve financial difficulties – 2017-2019 ====
In 2017, Interserve reported additional costs associated with quitting the energy-from-waste (EfW) sector, and by October, the firm was reported to be "battling for survival" after warning it would breach bank loan covenants; shares slumped 38% to 55p, valuing the company at just £80m. In January 2018, Interserve warned that its debt was set to rise above £513m at the year-end due to redundancy costs and cash outflows from its legacy EfW projects. Following the January 2018 collapse of Carillion, the Financial Times said Interserve was being monitored by the UK Government; the report led to a 15% drop in Interserve's share price. Market uncertainty following Carillion's liquidation continued, with Interserve struggling to agree a debt refinancing deal because Carillion's liquidation had spooked lenders; In April 2018, after Interserve reported a £244m loss for 2017 with debts almost doubled from £274m to £502.6m, analysts anticipated a possible sell-off of Interserve's international support services and construction divisions. Legacy EfW contracts dragged the half-year results down, and the company's share price continued to slide, dropping to 21p in early December. At that time, Interserve was reported to be in rescue refinancing talks with banks and other debt holders preparing to incur losses in a debt-for-equity swap that would see public shareholders virtually wiped out. On 10 December, after Interserve confirmed its deleveraging plan could result in "material dilution" for current Interserve shareholders, shares dived, eventually closing at 11.5p. The core principles of the deleveraging plan were reported to have been conditionally agreed between Interserve and its lenders on 21 December 2018, but negotiations continued through January 2019 before agreement was reached on 6 February, subject to approval by Interserve's shareholders. However, shareholders were resistant, making various counter-proposals which the Interserve board rejected, while lenders lined up a precautionary 'pre-pack administration' that would wipe out existing shareholders but keep Interserve operating if the deleveraging plan was not approved.

==== Interserve in administration ====
At an AGM on 15 March 2019, the deleveraging plan was rejected by shareholders, and trading in the company's shares was suspended. Interserve's board confirmed it had applied for the parent company to be placed into administration, and said it was pursuing the pre-pack option. The board later announced the group had been sold to a new company, Interserve Group Ltd, controlled by Interserve's existing lenders. The administration and pre-pack process meant banks wrote off up to £800m in loans, while shareholders lost their investments. In June 2019, it was reported that Interserve had collapsed owing creditors over £100m. In November 2019, Interserve announced an operational restructuring of the business which a City analyst said "looks like a precursor to the future splitting up the group." In March 2020, auditors red-flagged Interserve's finances as the company planned to break up its businesses.

==== Interserve break-up ====
In June 2020, Mitie announced it was to buy Interserve's 40,000-strong facilities management business in a cash and shares deal later valued at £190m (£120m in cash and a 17.5% shareholding in Mitie). The deal, cleared by competition authorities in November 2020 and completed on 1 December 2020, left Interserve focused on three remaining divisions: Interserve Construction, RMD Kwikform, and its Citizen Services group of businesses. On 2 March 2021, Interserve announced it was rebranding its construction and engineering services businesses, resurrecting the Tilbury Douglas name. Its Citizen Services business was renationalised by the Ministry of Justice on 24 June 2021 as part of the UK Government's new model of probation delivery, and on 6 October 2021, RMD Kwikform was sold to France's Altrad group for over £140m.

=== 2022: Re-establishment of Tilbury Douglas contracting business ===
In January 2022, Kier Group was reported to be in advanced talks to acquire Tilbury Douglas, with speculation Kier might pay around £50m for the almost-£500m turnover contractor. However, Kier discontinued negotiations in March 2022. In June 2022, Tilbury Douglas fully separated from Interserve Group and became a standalone construction contracting company owned by Interserve banks. Managing director Paul Gandy said the business had delivered more than £500m of projects in 2021, and its order-book totalled over £1bn. In the year to December 2019, it had a turnover of £480m but reported a £95m pre-tax loss. Tilbury Douglas had been the last major part of Interserve Group.

In August 2022, Northumbrian Water issued a claim for £23m from Tilbury Douglas and a joint venture partner (Doosan Enpure) relating to works undertaken as Interserve at Horsley treatment works; Tilbury Douglas disputed the claim but it was upheld by the High Court in November 2022. Tilbury Douglas accounts for the year to 31 December 2020 showed a turnover of £372m, down from £480m in 2019, and a pre-tax profit of £15.4m over the period, improving from the £91m loss it posted the year before.

By February 2023, Tilbury Douglas had resolved all of its energy-from-waste (EfW) issues and the Northumbrian Water case to achieve a "stable position". In its accounts for the year to 31 December 2022, the company made an £8.3m profit on a turnover of £446.9m having incurred some £2m costs in restructuring the business after leaving the Interserve Group.

By May 2024, Tilbury Douglas had cleared legacy Interserve commitments and was profitable in its first full year as a standalone contractor. In the year to December 2023, it reported revenue of £507m generating a pre-tax profit of almost £6m, and its order book stood at over £1bn.

In September 2024, Tilbury Douglas announced that CEO Paul Gandy would be standing down in November 2024, becoming president of the Chartered Institute of Building. He was replaced by former Bouygues UK chief operating officer Craig Tatton, who joined Interserve, now Tilbury Douglas, in 2017 and became COO in 2022. In the year to December 2024, the company reported turnover of £542m (up 7%) and a profit of £16.6m (up 30%).

In June 2025 it was reported that former Interserve shareholders had divested their interest in Tilbury Douglas, leaving the contractor jointly owned by Irish investors Burlington Loan Management and Guernsey-registered Pun Holdings.

In May 2026, Tilbury Douglas reported income of £600.1m for the year to 31 December 2025 (up from £541.6m in 2024) and a pre-tax profit up 23% to £14.8m. Its average monthly headcount was 1,268. It later (July 2026) also restored its balance sheet to a positive net asset position. Also in early 2026, Tilbury Douglas was one of the first UK contractors to deploy a humanoid construction robot onsite.

== Notable projects ==
=== Constructed as Interserve ===
- Thames Water Desalination Plant (completed in 2009), the first water desalination plant in the United Kingdom, built in Beckton, east London for Thames Water by a consortium of Interserve, Atkins Water and Spanish firm Acciona Agua
- Westminster Bridge refurbishment (completed in 2013), described by Transport for London (TFL) as "revolutionary works to repair the Capital's oldest bridge"; constructed by Interserve Project Services.

=== Constructed as Tilbury Douglas ===
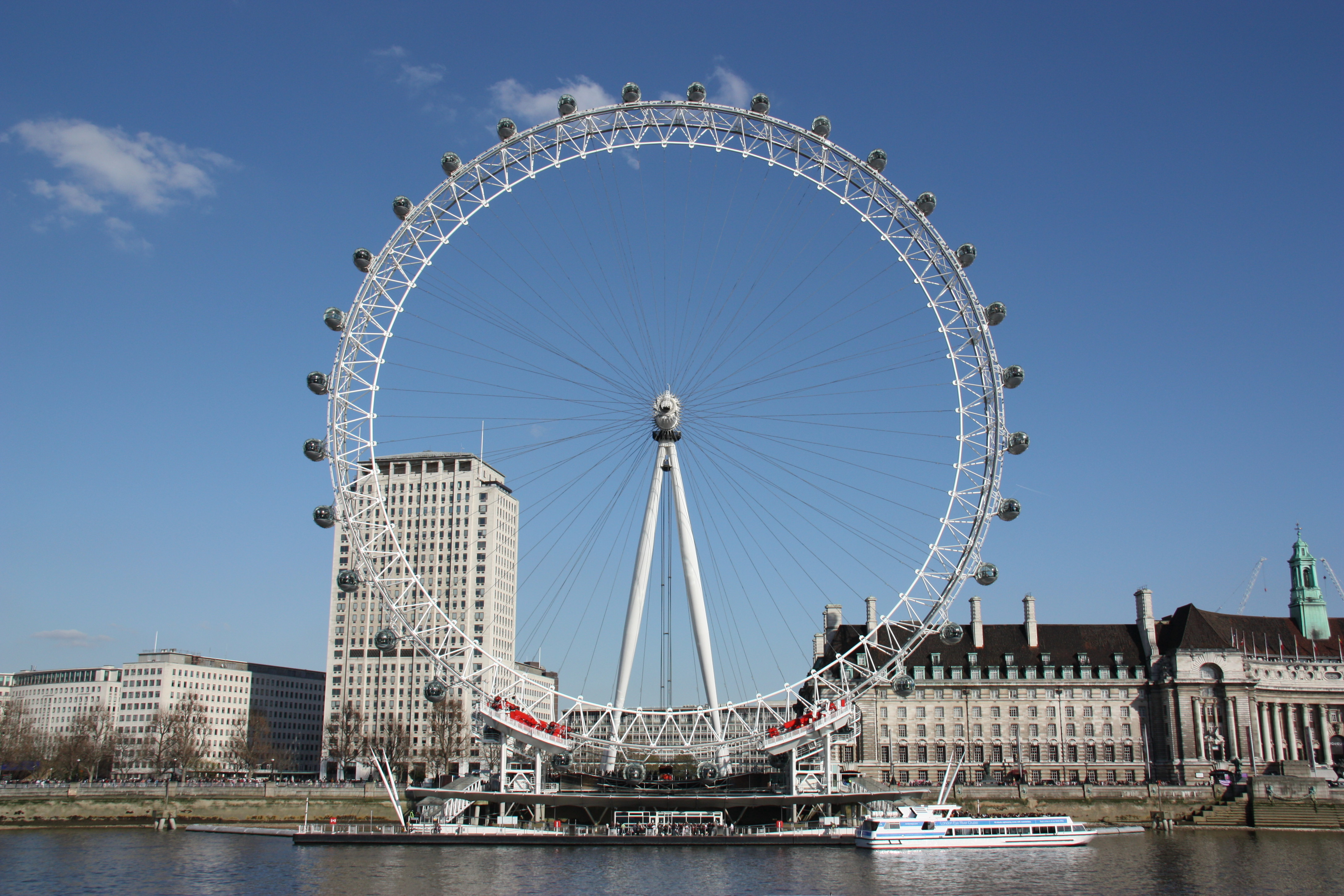
The London Eye

- The Den, Bermondsey, southeast London (completed in 1993), home of English football club Millwall.
- Redevelopment of the West Stand at Murrayfield Stadium, Edinburgh, Scotland (completed in 1994), home of the Scottish Rugby Union and home venue for the Scottish National Rugby team, as well as hosting games in the 1991, 1999 and 2007 Rugby World Cups.
- The Bonner Laboratory at the Rothera Research Station, Adelaide Island, British Antarctic Territory for British Antarctic Survey (completed in 1997).
- London Eye (completed in 2000), the Eye is described by its operators as "the world's tallest cantilevered observation wheel".

=== Constructed by RM Douglas ===
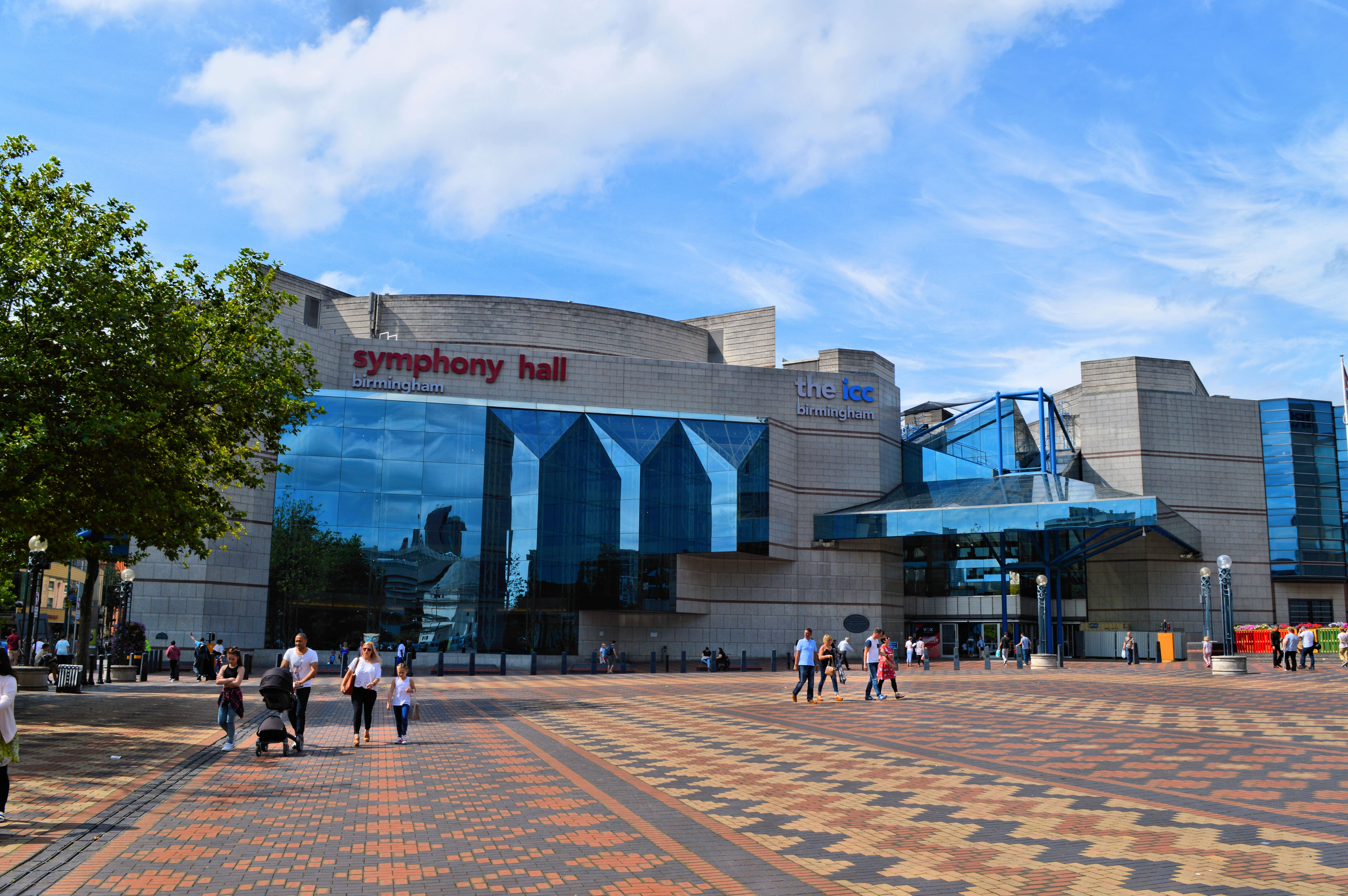
Exterior view of Symphony Hall and ICC (c.2015)

- National Exhibition Centre, Birmingham, UK. (completed in 1976)
- Don Valley Stadium, Sheffield, England, (completed in 1990), venue for the 1991 World Student Games.
- International Convention Centre, Birmingham, (completed in 1991), constructed in joint venture with Turner International.
- Symphony Hall, Birmingham, (completed in 1991), home of the City of Birmingham Symphony Orchestra (part of the International Convention Centre project).
- Motorways including:
  - M1 - Jct 18 to 30 (Kirby Muxloe – Whetstone) and Jct 18 to 30 (Nuthall – Sandiacre) (completed in 1968)
  - M4 - East of Jct37(A48) to Jct39 (Pyle by-pass) and J44 to J46 (Morriston by-pass) (completed in 1977)
  - M40 - Jct13 to Jct15 (Warwick South) and Jct12 to Jct13 (Gaydon) (completed in 1989)
  - M42 - Jct1 to Jct2 (Lickey End to Alvechurch) and Jct4 to Jct8 (Solihull Section) (completed in 1986)
  - M50 (completed in 1962)
  - M54 - Jct1 to Jct3 (Donington section) (completed 1982)
  - M6 - Jct7 to Jct8 (Rayhall to Great Barr), North of Jct6 to Jct7 (Great Barr to Perry Bar) and advance river works for Gravelly Hill Interchange colloquially known as Spaghetti Junction (completed in 1972)
  - A38(M) - Tower Road to Inner Ring Road (Lancaster Circus) (completed in 1972)
