= Rob Perrins =

- Born: April 1965 (age 59–60)
- Education: Marlborough College
- Alma mater: Aston University

Robert Charles Grenville Perrins (born April 1965) has been Managing Director of Berkeley Group Holdings since September 2009.

He was educated at Marlborough College and has a bachelor's degree in Geological Sciences from Aston University.

He joined Berkeley in 1994, having qualified as a chartered accountant in 1991. He joined the group main board in May 2001, becoming finance director shortly afterwards.
