= Irwin Mitchell =

International commercial law firm

- Headquarters: Sheffield, England, United Kingdom
- No. of offices: 20
- No. of attorneys: 1000
- No. of employees: 3,000+
- Major practice areas: General Practice
- Key people: Craig Marshall (Group Chief Executive Officer); Glyn Barker (Chairman)
- Revenue: £304m (2024)
- Date founded: 1912
- Founder: Walter Irwin Mitchell
- Company type: Limited liability partnership
- Website: irwinmitchell.com

Irwin Mitchell is a full service law firm in the United Kingdom, established in Sheffield in 1912. The firm offers legal and wealth management services from its 20 offices, and employs more than 3,000 people.

In 2018 the company was ranked 21st largest UK based law firm in terms of worldwide revenue, with a turnover of £241.8 million.

== History ==
=== 1912 – 2009 ===
Irwin Mitchell was founded by Walter Irwin Mitchell in Sheffield in 1912, concentrating on criminal law. The firm acted on behalf of various gangs during the Sheffield Gang Wars of the 1920s.

For most of the twentieth century, Irwin Mitchell was based solely in Sheffield. Over the course of this period the company evolved into a general practice, becoming particularly well known for its personal injury work. In 1989 the firm opened an office in Birmingham, with a Leeds office opening its doors in 1993 and a London office opening in 1995.

The company also made a number of acquisitions throughout the 1990s. Kershaw Tudor was acquired in 1994, then followed Teeman Levine (1995), Rigbeys (1996), and Braby & Waller in (1998). Irwin Mitchell continued its expansion in the early 2000s, opening a Newcastle office in 2003 as well as acquiring personal injury outfit Lorenzo Zurbrugg that same year.

In 2005 the firm opened two new offices in Spain. The year Irwin Mitchell moved internationally was also the year the firm's annual turnover broke the £100 million barrier for the first time. The next year Irwin Mitchell merged with personal injury and medical negligence firm Alexander Harris, which had offices in London, Solihull and Altrincham. This merger was quickly followed with the opening of a Manchester office in early 2007. 2007 also saw the firm get a foothold in Scotland when it acquired Golds, together with its Glasgow office.

=== Recent history (2010 – present) ===
In 2010 Irwin Mitchell became one of the first UK law firms to convert to a legal disciplinary partnership, which allowed non-solicitors to become equity partners in the firm. The following year the firm announced its intention to become an alternative business structure (ABS), in order that it could seek external investment. In preparation for becoming an ABS, the firm created a new holding company.

In 2012 the application to become an alternative business structure was approved by the Solicitor's Regulation Authority. This made Irwin Mitchell the nineteenth law firm to convert to an alternative business structure, and the first to do so under a "multi-licence". Following the approval of the alternative business structure, the firm continued its expansion with a string of acquisitions and office launches over the next three years. This growth was financed in part by a £60 million finance package that was announced in 2014, funded by HSBC, Lloyds Bank and Royal Bank of Scotland.

In 2013 the firm acquired personal injury specialists MPH Solicitors. This was followed in 2014 with new offices being opened in Southampton and Cambridge. Summer 2014 saw the firm launch a joint venture with online insurer esure called IMe Law. This venture involved a team in the firm's Sheffield office providing legal representation for esure customers who have been injured in motor accidents. In November 2014 Irwin Mitchell announced the acquisition of Berkeley Law, a boutique firm based in Mayfair. Berkeley Law was a specialist in advising high net worth individuals from the UK and abroad.

2015 saw Irwin Mitchell open a consulting office in Middlesbrough. Later that year Irwin Mitchell merged with Thomas Eggar, acquiring its network of five offices in London and the South East. The deal created a £250 million turnover company and signalled a significant shift in focus, with 50% of the firm's income coming from business and private client work.

In 2016 the firm launched a new proposition targeted at private individuals, called Irwin Mitchell Private Wealth. The proposition consolidated teams from Irwin Mitchell, Thomas Eggar, Berkeley Law and Berkeley Hurrell (Berkeley Law's conveyancing subsidiary).

In July 2019 the firm opened its 15th UK office, in Reading. In May 2022 the firm further expanded by opening offices in Cardiff and Liverpool Today the firm has 17 UK offices in Birmingham, Bristol, Cambridge, Cardiff, Chichester, Gatwick, Glasgow, Leeds, Liverpool, London, Manchester, Middlesbrough (consulting office), Newbury, Newcastle, Reading, Sheffield and Southampton.

In 2023 Irwin Mitchell's turnover was £271 million, with a pre-tax profit of £13.8 million. This makes the firm the 21st largest in the UK by global revenue.

== Subsidiaries ==
=== Ascent Performance Group ===
Ascent is a specialist legal collections and recoveries business, formed in 2009. In 2012 the firm became an alternative business structure as part of Irwin Mitchell's "multi-licence" application. In 2015 Ascent acquired the commercial debt recovery division of Sheffield-based P&A Receivables Services.

=== Coris UK ===
Irwin Mitchell operates the UK arm of the European network of the Coris Group. The network, established in 1987, assists insurers in managing injury and material damage claims in foreign countries. In 2012 the firm became an alternative business structure as part of Irwin Mitchell's "multi-licence" application.

=== Irwin Mitchell Abogados ===
In 2005 Irwin Mitchell expanded into Spain, offering legal services from offices in Marbella and Madrid. In 2013 the firm sold off its Spanish offices to Cremades & Calvo-Sotelo, also signing an alliance to work together in the future.

=== IM Asset Management ===
IM Asset Management was founded in 2005, and offers financial planning and investment advice services to people who have received personal injury compensation. In 2018 IM Asset Management had over £600 million funds under management.

In 2017 the subsidiary launched the IM Wealth Management trading style. This brand offers financial planning and investment advice services, but to a broader investor audience.

=== Irwin Mitchell Scotland ===
Irwin Mitchell Scotland was incorporated in 2011 and has an office in Glasgow. The firm offers a range of legal services under Scottish law.

In 2024 the firm made a strategic investment in Scottish firm Wright, Johnston & Mackenzie LLP. The firm’s growth in the Scottish legal sector was further developed with WJM’s acquisition of Davidson, Chalmers & Stewart LLP in mid 2025, bringing WJM’s headcount to around 250 with 49 partners. Both WJM & DCS are set to be rebranded as Irwin Mitchell towards the end of 2025.
