= Debbie White (businesswoman) =

British businesswoman (born 1962)

- Born: Debra Jayne White; May 1962 (age 63)
- Occupation: Businesswoman
- Children: 3 sons

Debra Jayne White (born May 1962) is a British accountant and businesswoman. She was the chief executive (CEO) of Interserve from September 2017 until the end of 2019. In March 2020, the UK Government asked White to advise it on the establishment of a UK-wide network of testing centres in response to the COVID-19 pandemic. In December 2021, White was appointed HR director at BT Group, and, in July 2023, was announced as the next chair of The Co-operative Group with effect from February 2024.

== Career ==
=== Early career ===
White trained as an accountant with Arthur Andersen, and later joined AstraZeneca and then PwC Consulting. In 2004, White was appointed as the chief financial officer of Sodexo's UK operations, and rose to become chief executive of government and healthcare worldwide.

=== CEO of Interserve ===
In September 2017, White succeeded Adrian Ringrose as CEO of Interserve. The company was "battling for survival" after warning it would breach bank loan covenants, and in early 2018 attempted to financially restructure its business. In November 2018, White said the group would unveil further plans to tackle its debt mountain in early 2019, later confirming a deleveraging plan that would result in "material dilution" for current Interserve shareholders. While the deal was agreed with lenders, it was subject to approval by Interserve's shareholders, and Interserve risked going into administration if that approval was not given. At an AGM on 15 March 2019, the deleveraging plan was rejected by shareholders, its shares were suspended, and Interserve's board applied for the parent company to be placed into administration while it pursued a pre-pack option. A new private company, Interserve Group Ltd, controlled by Interserve's existing lenders, emerged. In November 2019, Interserve announced an operational restructuring of the business; as a result, White left the business at the end of 2019.

=== Career, 2020-present ===
In March 2020, White took on an unpaid role to advise on the set up of a UK-wide network of testing centres as part of the UK Government's response to the COVID-19 pandemic.

In December 2021, White was appointed HR Director at BT Group.

In July 2023, White was named as the next chair of The Co-operative Group. She was set to join the retail group as a non-executive director in August 2023, taking over as chair in February 2024.

White is a member of the Women 1st Top 100 Club.

== Personal life ==
White has three sons.
