= Glyn Barker =

British businessman

- Born: Glyn Anthony Barker; September 1953 (age 72)
- Title: Chairman, Interserve; Chairman, Irwin Mitchell; Chairman, Berkeley Group Holdings
- Board member of: Interserve; Irwin Mitchell; Aviva; Berkeley Group Holdings; Transocean Limited

Glyn Anthony Barker (born September 1953) is a British businessman who is chairman of Interserve (since September 2017), the law firm Irwin Mitchell and Berkeley Group Holdings (from 2020 for up to two years until a permanent replacement is identified).

Barker is a non-executive director of Aviva since February 2012 and Transocean Limited. Barker is an adviser for Novalpina Capital, a private equity firm.
