= Berkeley Group Holdings =

British property developer

Berkeley Group Holdings plc
- Type: Public
- Traded as: LSE: BKG; FTSE 250 Index component
- Industry: Housebuilding
- Founded: 1976; 50 years ago
- Headquarters: Cobham, England, UK
- Key people: Michael Dobson (Chairman); Rob Perrins (CEO)
- Revenue: ▼£2,383.3 million (2026)
- Operating income: ▼£446.8 million (2026)
- Net income: ▼£318.3 million (2026)
- Number of employees: 2,532 (2025)
- Website: www.berkeleygroup.co.uk

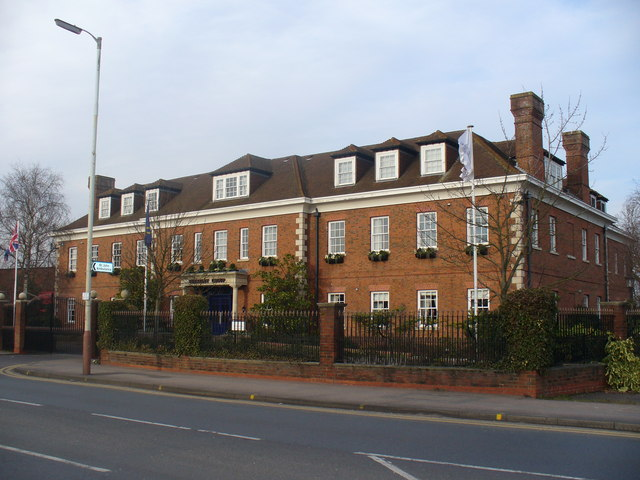
Berkeley Group offices in Cobham, Surrey

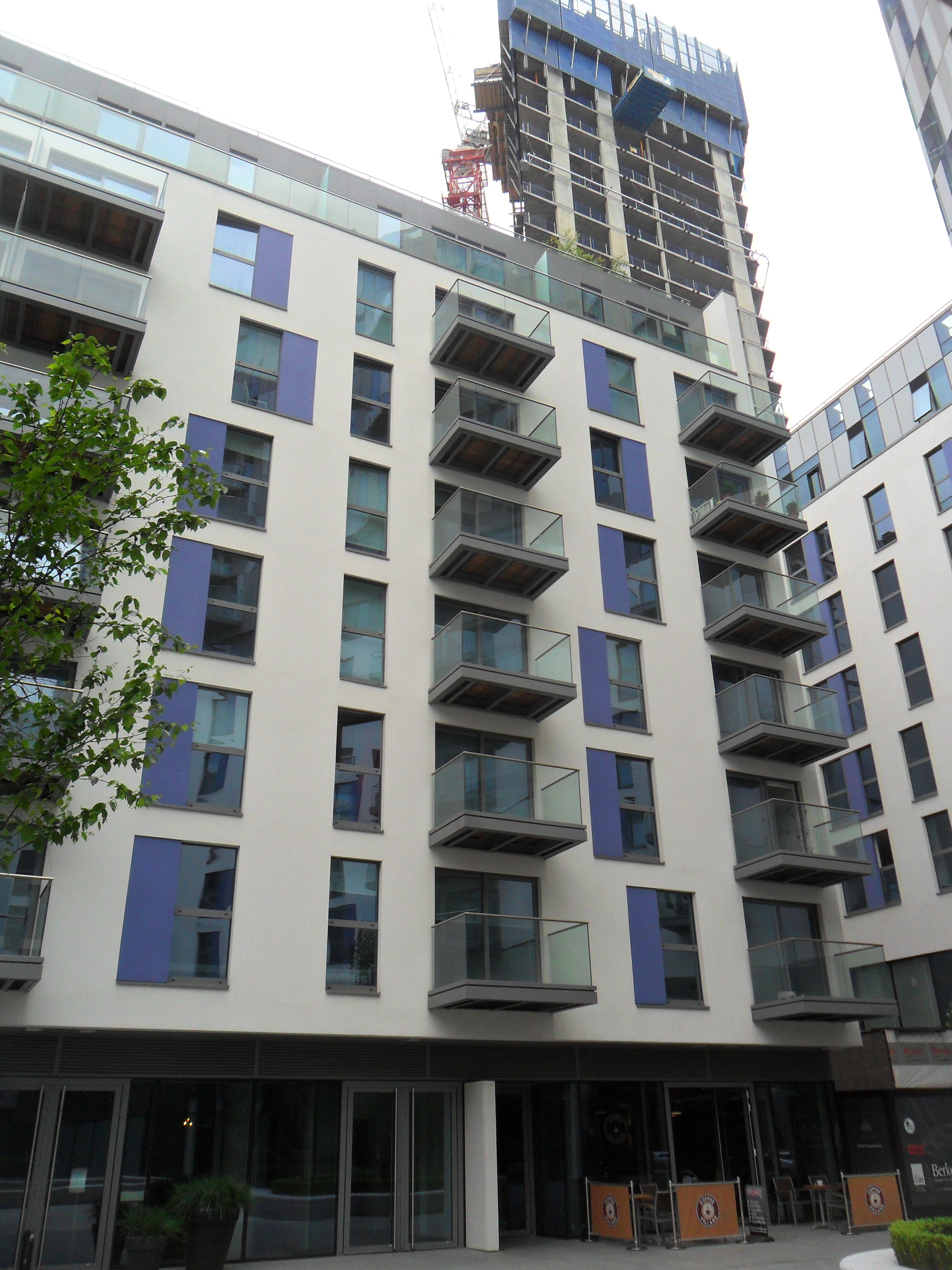
Saffron Square, Croydon

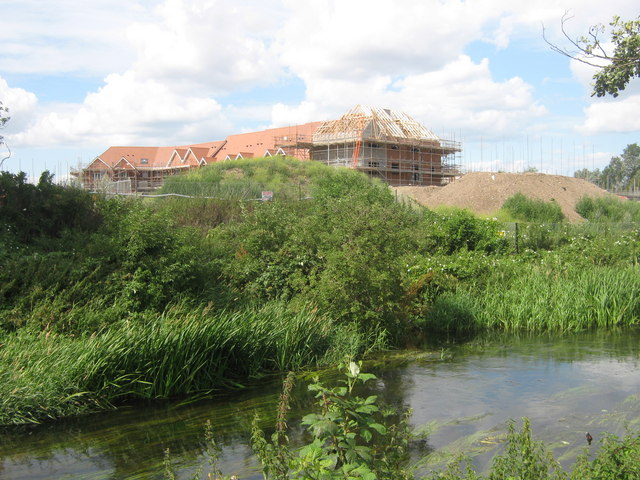
Kingsmead Park, Kent

The Berkeley Group Holdings plc is a British property developer and house-builder based in Cobham, England. It is listed on the London Stock Exchange and is a constituent of the FTSE 250 Index.

The firm was founded in 1976 by Tony Pidgley and Jim Farrer as Berkeley Homes after departing Crest Homes. Initially focused on the home counties, it floated on the Unlisted Securities Market in 1984 and expanded geographically to the west, the south midlands, and East Anglia throughout that decade. Throughout the early 1990s, Berkley Group completed numerous acquisitions and created several joint ventures with other businesses; it also started to focus on major urban regeneration sites in big cities around this time. During 2003, Tony Pidgley's son and one-time director of Berkeley Group, Tony Kelly Pidgley, reportedly intended to take ownership of Berkeley Group via several external backers. The firm was negatively impacted by the Great Recession, opting to reduce its home construction rate for several years.

In the aftermath of the Grenfell Tower fire in 2017, a national crises over the presence of flammable cladding on numerous high rise buildings broke out; several Berkeley Group's buildings were reported as having been built without the proper fire measures and some had caught fire, such as Richmond House in 2019 and Holborough Lakes in 2017, while other buildings built by Berkeley were deemed to be such a fire risk that they required immediate evacuation. In February 2024, Berkeley Group was among eight British housebuilders to be targeted by the Competition and Markets Authority (CMA) during an investigation into suspected breaches of competition law.

== History ==
The company was founded by Tony Pidgley and Jim Farrer in Weybridge in 1976 as Berkeley Homes, a name borne by regional subsidiaries. Pidgley (the dominant partner) and Farrer had previously run the housing division of Crest Homes and they aimed to focus on executive housing on single plots or small sites. Over the next few years, Berkeley expanded across the home counties, and while building less than 100 houses per year, it floated its shares on the Unlisted Securities Market in 1984.

Following the flotation, Berkeley Group expanded geographically to the west, the south midlands, and East Anglia; it also formed a joint venture, St George, to build in central London. By 1988, Berkeley was building over 600 executive homes per year. By then, Pidgley was aware of the overheating in the housing market and sold houses aggressively to realise cash. For two years the company did no more than break even, but its cash position was strong; during 1991, it was able to purchase the Manchester-based Crosby Homes and the outstanding 50 per cent of St George. That same year, it also announced the creation of a joint venture with the Saudi Arabian firm Saad Investments that involved a £100 million investment. In May 1992, Jim Farrer stepped down as the firm's chairman, becoming a non-executive director.

During March 1993, amid strong fiscal results, Berkeley Group announced its intention to raise £44.1 million via a rights issue. Later that year, the company announced it had made a pre-tax profit of £12.6 million, up to 83 per cent over the prior year, while unit sales rose to 656 from 468. Amid the early 1990s recession, Berkeley Group opted to purchase numerous large development sites at distressed prices. It was during the 1990s that Berkeley changed its operational orientation towards major urban regeneration sites in London, Birmingham, Manchester, and other northern cities.

Tony Pidgley's son, Tony Kelly Pidgley, became an employee of Berkeley Group after it purchased his own company, Thirlstone Homes, in exchange for £15 million and appointed him as the managing director of the Berkeley Homes division in August 1998. During February 2001, Pidgley Junior resigned from his position on the board, citing differences of opinion over the direction of Berkeley Group; he subsequently founded the rival building company Cadenza. Two years later, Pidgley Junior reportedly intended to take ownership of Berkeley Group with the aid of several external financial backers.

During the early 2000s, Berkeley Group refined its strategy to concentrate primarily on relatively large scale urban redevelopments in the London area. In 2003, it announced the deferred sale of Crosby Homes; the reduction in scale was intended to generate surplus cash, and a scheme of arrangement to return £1.45 million to shareholders was launched in 2004. Two years later, Crosby Homes was sold to the Australian developer Lend Lease in exchange for £261 million. That same year, the firm announced its plan for a new housing project that would produce net zero carbon dioxide emissions, which it claimed to be one of the first such developments in the world.

The start of the Great Recession led to Berkeley Group reducing its rate of home construction; it would not return to its pre-crisis output until 2013. In December 2012, Berkeley Group reported that profits had increased by 40 per cent while revenue had risen by 70 per cent during the first six months of the financial year. During the mid 2010s, the firm opted to maintain its investment focus upon various new sites around London; it also publicly stated that it was to deliver additional housing in response to demand.

During early 2013, a report compiled by Berkeley Group called for local authorities to acceleration decision making, stating that it could create 420,000 jobs in the construction sector and help the nation avoid a recession. That same month, Berkeley Group and the Wellcome Trust created a joint venture to undertake regeneration projects in the South-east that was valued at up to £400 million. In November 2014, Berkeley Group and National Grid plc established a joint venture, St William Home, valued at roughly £700 million.

In 2014, the firm was recognised at being the most sustainable larger homebuilder in the UK by NextGeneration. One year later, the company won Large Developer of the Year at the RESI awards organised by Property Week.

During January 2020, it was reported that the company would return £1 billion to its shareholders over the following two years; prior to this announcement, it had been intended to pay the shareholders £455 million. In March 2020, amid the COVID-19 pandemic, Berkeley Group stated that coronavirus had cost it £80 million in just six weeks and began shutting down most of its sites; it also postponed a £455 million payout to the firm's shareholders. In June 2020, the company announced it was consulting on up to 200 redundancies, and revealed its pre-tax profits were down 35 per cent, accompanied by falls in both sales and revenues, which were claimed to be in part due to the pandemic.

In June 2020, Berkeley Group opted to again defer the payment of £455 million to shareholders by two years, a decision which it attributed to the economic consequences of the pandemic. That same month, it was revealed that the company had increased its net cash reserve to £1.1 billion, which was over £100 million higher than one year prior.

During July 2020, the firm's founder and chairman Tony Pidgley died; non-executive director Glyn Barker was appointed as interim chairman for up to two years until a permanent replacement is identified.

In October 2021, via a joint venture with warehouse developer Segro, Berkeley Group launched a scheme to deliver Britain's first multi-storey warehouse, based in north-west London. One year later, it bought out National Grid Plc's stake in St William Homes, which involved in excess of 20,000 future homes across 24 sites, in exchange for roughly £400 million. During 2023, the firm slowed its land purchase activities. Later that same year, Berkeley Group announced that it would not invest in new housing schemes for the time being amid uncertain economic conditions.

In July 2023, a venue in Ladywood, Birmingham reached full capacity of around 200 people, leaving another 200 people "locked out" after an agreement was reached between Berkeley Homes and the council to regenerate the area. The proposals envisaged adding 12,000 new homes across the 60ha estate, upgrades of existing social housing and creation of new green spaces, community facilities and local centres, but the £2.2bn partnership proved unviable and was dissolved in November 2026. The leader of the council, Councillor Sir Albert Bore blamed "residents unprepared to listen" for the debacle which had led to the loss of the "most significant housing redevelopment opportunity in a generation".

In February 2024, Berkeley Group was among eight British house-builders to be targeted by the Competition and Markets Authority (CMA) during an investigation into suspected breaches of competition law. The CMA stated that it had evidence that firms shared commercially sensitive information with competitors, influencing the build-out of sites and the prices of new homes. In January 2025, the CMA said it was conducting further investigations into the suspected anti-competitive conduct. In June 2025, the CMA investigation was extended to August 2025. In July 2025, the housebuilders offered to pay £100 million towards affordable housing programme as part of an agreement to reform practices on information sharing and to end the investigation without admitting any liability or wrongdoing. On 30 October 2025, the CMA confirmed its investigation had been dropped in return for a £100m payment towards affordable homes and other measures including the development of industry-wide guidance on information sharing and agreements not to share certain types of information with other housebuilders.

Also in June 2025, the group announced impending personnel changes: CEO Rob Perrins would become executive chair, taking over from Michael Dobson, after the firm's AGM in September 2025, with CFO Richard Stearn succeeding Perrins as CEO. Berkeley Homes reported a £529m pre-tax profit on revenue of £2,486.5m in the year to 30 April 2025 as it delivered 4,300 homes.

== Operations ==
Berkeley Homes has built some apartment towers in central London, including the One Blackfriars skyscraper (2014). In smaller operations, it runs urban redevelopment programmes via Berkeley Community Villages and constructs in commercial property via Berkeley Commercial. Another subsidiary, Berkeley First, builds student and key worker accommodation. The operational subsidiaries include Berkeley Homes plc, which plans the largest estates and hires contractors with responsibility for the management of communal areas unless and until taken over by residents' Right to Manage companies. The developer imposes covenants to retain value across homes in its neighbourhoods.

Large examples of operations include community facilities with village-sized neighbourhoods which are green-buffered and constructed closes of apartments and houses; for example, a scheme in Bracknell for 750 new homes, a primary school, extra care facility, roads, landscaping and local shops to be constructed on mixed-use land to expand the Warfield suburb, beside the town's computing and headquarters business parks.

In south London, major developments include Wimbledon Hill Park, Kidbrooke Village and Royal Arsenal Riverside in Woolwich. In May 2026, a proposed redevelopment by Berkeley of the Aylesham Centre in Peckham was rejected over heritage concerns.

== Controversies ==
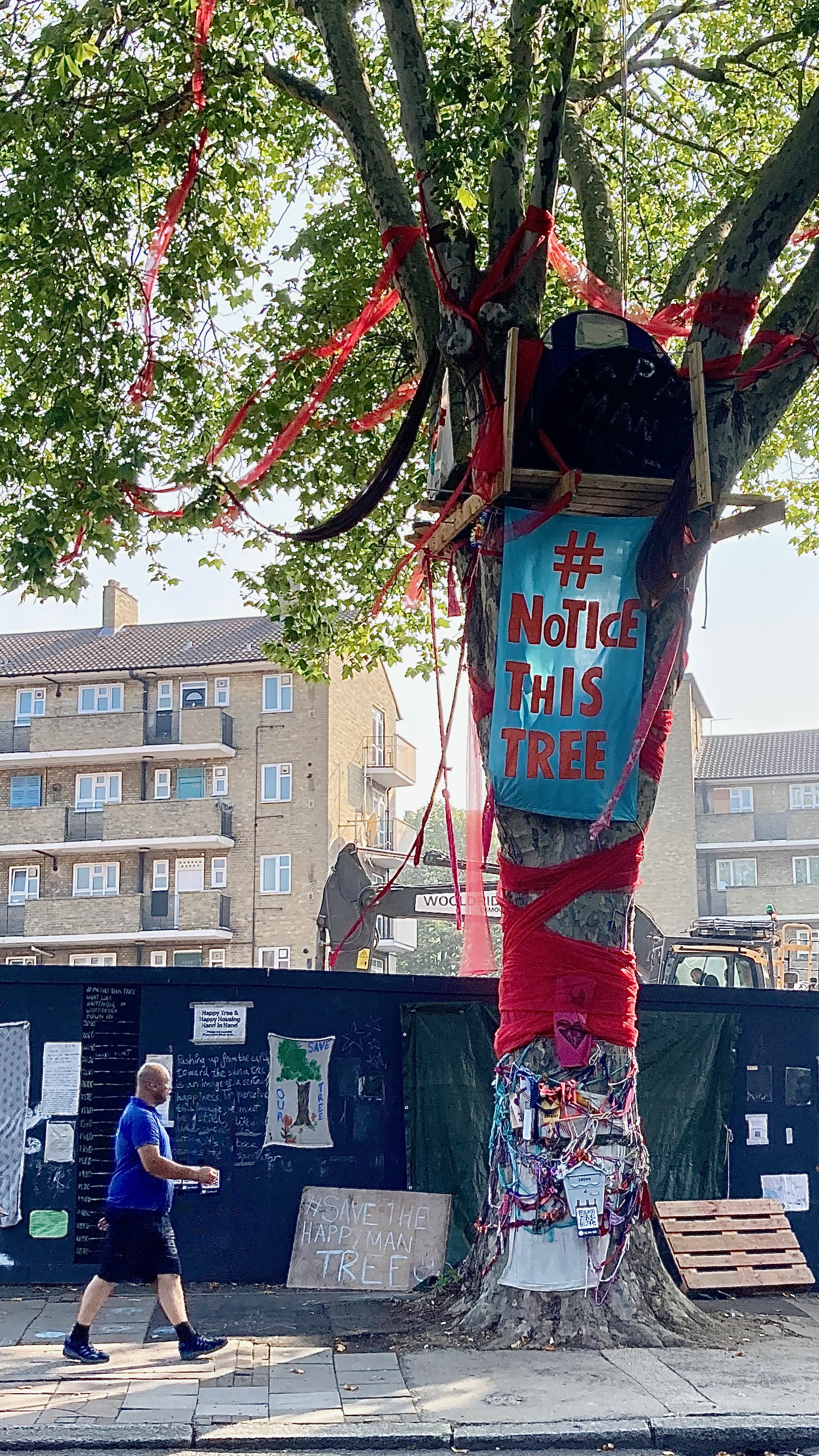
The Happy Man Tree with campaigners' decorations

=== Flammable cladding ===
Following the Grenfell Tower fire in 2017, it emerged that many high rise buildings in the UK had been built with flammable cladding and insulation, and that many developers had not installed required fire hazard mitigation measures. Several Berkeley Group's buildings were reported as having been built without the proper fire measures and some of their buildings have caught fire, such as Richmond House (part of the Hamptons development in Worcester Park, southwest London) in 2019 and Holborough Lakes, in Snodland, Kent in 2017.

In the case of Richmond House, Andy Roe, former Commissioner of the London Fire Brigade (LFB) told a London Assembly committee that the building had been damaged beyond repair "in approximately 11 minutes once the fire had taken hold … entirely due to problems with internal compartmentation and poor standards of construction". Arnold Tarling, a fire safety expert, found similar fire safety problems at other blocks of flats at Berkeley's Hamptons development. "There were large gaps. There was no fire-stopping. And it was packed full of wood fibre...". LFB's Roe said he uncovered similar defects at other Berkeley developments, including one in Reading and at Holborough Lakes, where the 2017 fire destroyed a block of flats with the same timber-frame construction as Richmond House. Hansen, a solicitor acting for Richmond House residents, stated that rather than paying appropriate compensation to the residents, "Berkeley has since instructed contractual dispute solicitors who are now denying liability and saying, 'We are not paying anything.'"

Other buildings built by Berkeley were deemed to be such a fire risk that they required immediate evacuation, such as the Paragon estate in Brentford. However, like many UK developers, Berkeley Holdings Group opted not to pay for the required fire safety remediation works for several of its buildings, so leaseholders had to fund it themselves. The cost per flat for installing the required fire safety mitigation measures was reported as amounting to over £100,000 per flat. The government, media and the UK Cladding Action Group called on developers to pay for the remediation works, as some leaseholders had already declared bankruptcy over the fire safety costs. Berkeley Group also rejected a call for an industry wide developer levy to help fund the remediation costs.

=== Happy Man Tree dispute ===
In 2020, Berkeley Homes was involved in a dispute with environmental campaigners over a 150 year old plane tree, known locally as the Happy Man Tree, which it wants removed as part of regeneration work on Woodberry Down estate in Hackney. Berkeley Homes and Hackney Council sought an injunction against peaceful protesters from blocking the removal of the tree, which was granted.
