= Crest Nicholson =

Housebuilder company in Surrey, England

- Type: Public
- Traded as: LSE: CRST
- Industry: Housebuilding
- Founded: 1963
- Headquarters: Weybridge, Surrey, England
- Key people: Iain Ferguson (Chairman); Martyn Clark (CEO)
- Revenue: ▼£610.8 million (2025)
- Operating income: ▲£34.7 million (2025)
- Net income: ▲£2.2 million (2025)
- Website: www.crestnicholson.com

Crest Nicholson is a British housebuilding company based in Weybridge, Surrey, England. It is listed on the London Stock Exchange.

== History ==
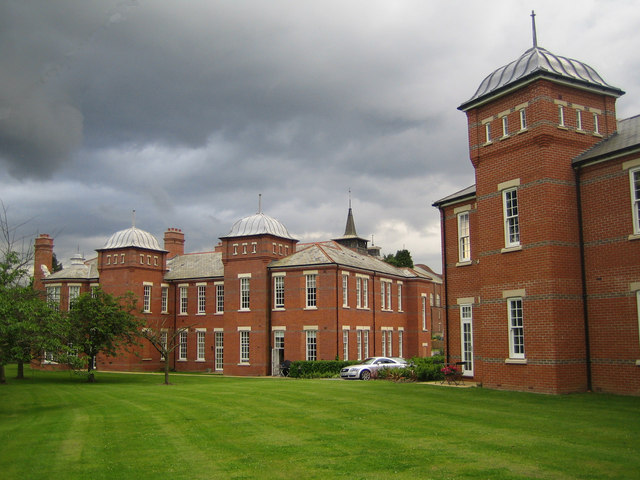
Napsbury Park, a Crest Nicholson redevelopment in Hertfordshire

=== 1963–2000 ===
The company was founded by Bryan Skinner in 1963 as Crest Homes and floated on the London Stock Exchange in 1968. One of the characteristics that differentiated Crest from most other housebuilders of the time was "not to hold large stocks of land".

During 1969, Crest made its first diversification via the acquisition of En-Tout-Cas, a leading firm in tennis court construction. Two years later, it purchased Tony Pidgley's earth moving business; Pidgley teamed up with Jim Farrer, a board member and originally the estate agent who had provided Skinner with his first land. These two ran Crest's housing until 1975, at which point they left to form Berkeley Homes.

In 1972, a new holding company, Crest Securities, was formed to facilitate further diversification. At the end of that year, Crest bought Camper & Nicholsons, a leading yacht manufacturer, leading to the firm changing its name to Crest Nicholson. Additional acquisitions followed, such as the Lamson Engineering (1975), the spectacle makers Crofton (1979) and Greenwood Electronics (1983). Crest also bought the west-country construction firm of CH Pearce in 1985.

During 1983, Bryan Skinner retired due to ill health; following management changes, many of the moves towards diversification were reversed. Non-housing businesses were sold in the late 1980s while in the housing division Crest started to pursue the acquisition of a long land bank.

Crest Nicholson encountered considerable challenges in 1991; in addition to incurring a £34 million loss for the six months to April of that year, its head office was permanently closed and 150 jobs were lost as the company was restructured while chief executive Roger Lewis stepped down from his position. On 1 January 1991, John St Lawrence was appointed as chairman of Crest Nicholson; job losses increased to 300 around this time. Six months later, the company had recorded a pre-tax loss of £1.7 million for the first half of the year; it has also sold its loss-making sports surface business.

During early 1993, the firm reportedly became profitable once again. Profits would increase during the following years as the housing market recovered from the early 1990s recession. In 1999, Crest Nicholson set up a dedicated construction management arm that focused on urban development opportunities.

=== 2000–2019 ===
During June 2000, Pearce Group, the construction division of Crest Nicholson, reported an operating loss of £100,000 over a six month period, which was attributed to its retail activities; despite this, the division benefitted from a housing boom at that time. In the following year, chief executive John Callcutt publicly voiced his opposition to both mergers and quotas in the housebuilding sector. During early 2002, Crest Nicholson began seeking a buyer for Pearce Group, although it went on to reject an offer submitted by Montpellier in June of that year. In the latter half of 2002, Pearce Group was reoriented towards the public sector and its high-tech unit was permanently shuttered amid losses. Pearce Group was eventually sold via a management buyout.

During the mid 2000s, Crest Nicholson placed an increased emphasis on the affordable housing sector of the market, and continued to pursue organic growth of the business. In March 2005, Heron Corporation submitted a £480 million bid to takeover Crest Nicholson which was rejected by the firm's management; two months later, Heron walked away from talks.

In March 2007, the company was taken private after it accepted a £715 million offer from a consortium led by HBOS and Sir Tom Hunter, the Scottish entrepreneur. The company was re-listed on the London Stock Exchange in February 2013.

During 2010, subsidiary company Crest Nicholson (Londinium) Ltd. was party to a high court and Court of Appeal case which addressed the difference between the court's role in construing the terms of a contract which two parties had agreed, and its role in assessing whether an offer capable of acceptance had been made, and if so, whether it had been accepted.

In May 2018, it was reported that Stephen Stone, the then chief executive of Crest Nicholson, had stepped down after heading the housebuilder for 12 years. Strong became the firm's executive chairman while Patrick Bergin was appointed chief executive.

During June 2018, it was reported that the company would be pulling back from the London housing market as a cost-cutting measure. It will close its central London office and will be less likely to buy land in London.

In January 2019, Crest Nicholson put a £400 million housing development in Hove on hold in response to the company achieving lower profits. The company's chief executive, Patrick Bergin, informed The Times that "It would be imprudent of us to make a commitment on a scheme of that type when we've got limited visibility on future pricing."

During September 2019, the company appointed Peter Truscott as chief executive along with the adoption of a new strategy of reducing overhead costs and repositioning its margins. That same month, it announced the appointment of Iain Ferguson as its new chairman.

=== 2020–present ===
In January 2020, Truscott said the company had over-concentrated on building off-site manufacturing capabilities, and would now focus on improving on-site operational efficiency and on introducing group-wide construction specifications to cut material buying costs. Poor financial performance was blamed on political uncertainty and the impact of the COVID-19 pandemic and led to the company consulting on 130 redundancies from its 966-strong workforce.

During June 2023, Crest Nicholson was found liable for the actions of a site manager who an employment tribunal stated to have raped a colleague after a work Christmas party.

In June 2024, Crest Nicholson reported a pre-tax loss of £30.9 million in the half year to April 2024 on turnover of £257.5 million. Having reported provisions for £15 million of legacy contract problems relating to its former Regeneration division, it increased the provision to £31.4 million following a review supported by external consultants. The company also set aside £145.2 million relating to historic building fire safety costs. CEO Peter Truscott stepped down and was replaced by former Persimmon executive Martyn Clark.

Also in June 2024, Crest Nicholson said it had rejected a takeover bid from Bellway after receiving all-share proposals on 25 April and 14 May, the latter valuing the firm at £650 million. As a further all-share offer from Bellway remained possible until 11 July 2024, Crest Nicholson rejected a competing approach from rival housebuilder Avant Homes. On 10 July 2024, the Crest Nicholson board said it was "minded to recommend" an improved Bellway takeover offer of £720m to the company's shareholders. On 8 August, the two companies were given a further 12 days to finish their due diligence work regarding the proposed merger, but Bellway called off its bid on 13 August 2024.

In January 2025, Crest Nicholson delayed publication of its latest financial results to give its auditors more time to confirm historic building fire safety costs. In February 2025, Crest Nicholson reported a £143.7m pre-tax loss for the year to 31 October 2024 on revenue of £618.2m. The results included a total fire remediation provision of £249.3m. Total home completions were down 7.3% at 1,873 (2023: 2,020). In November 2025, the company announced cost-cutting measures and warned pre-tax profit for the year would come in at the bottom end of expectations. It planned to close one divisional office putting 50 jobs at risk.

In May 2026, Crest Nicholson delayed its half-year results to 16 July 2026 pending completion of talks with lenders about a temporary covenant relaxation relating to lower than expected profitability due to the Middle East crisis. In the July announcement, Crest Nicholson reported a £35m half-year loss, revenue down 21% to £198m, completions dropped from 739 to 584 homes, and net debt almost doubled to £142m; directors were still negotiating with lenders over revised banking covenants. In September 2026, Crest Nicholson issued a profit warning after poor summer trading resulted in a forecast £10m operating loss.
