= Happy Man Tree =

Plane tree in Woodberry Down, Hackney, London

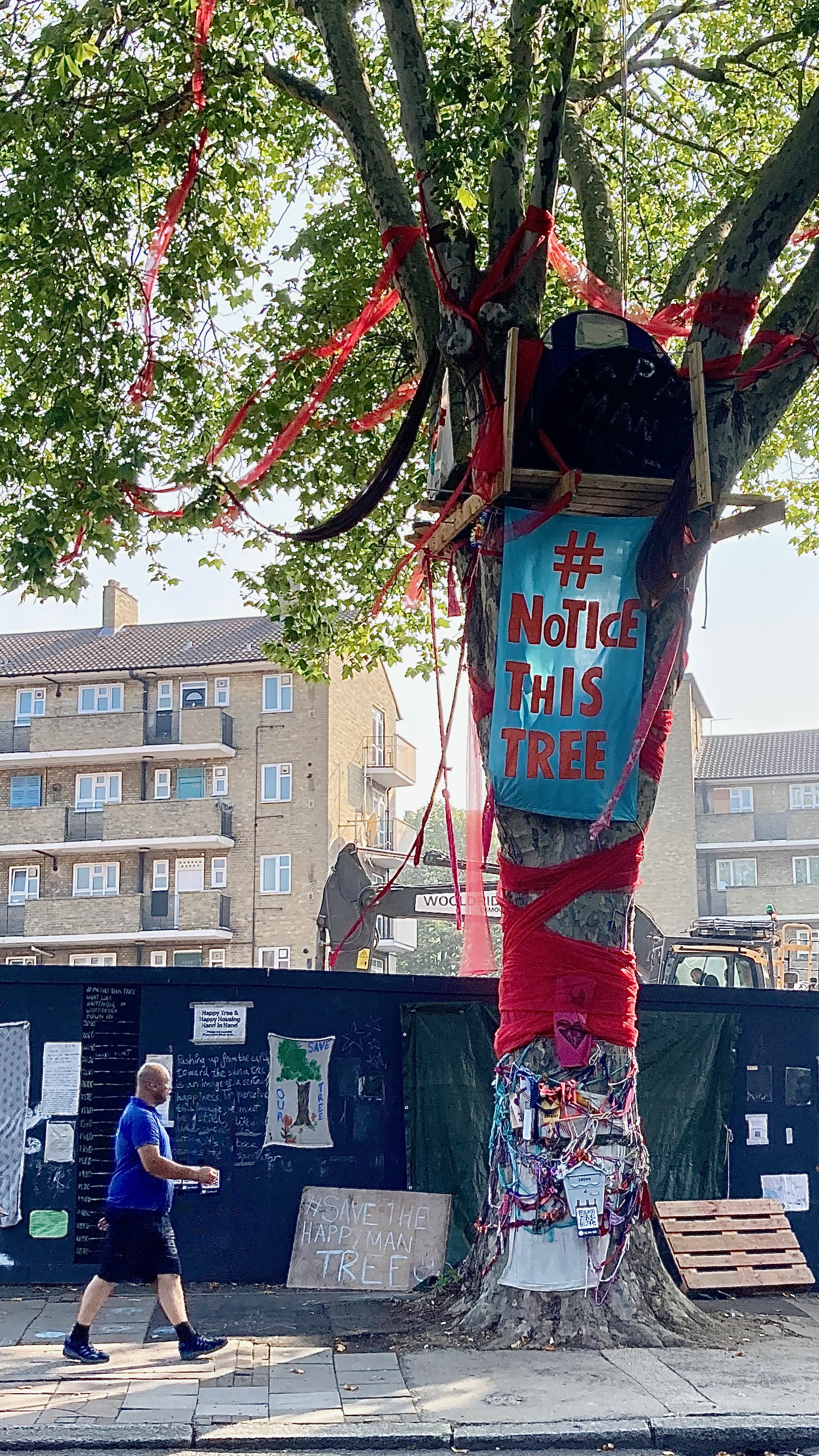
- Protest materials on and around the tree with building work ongoing in the background

- Location within London Borough of Hackney
- Species: London plane (Platanus × hispanica)
- Location: Hackney, London, England
- Coordinates: 51°34′19.5″N 00°05′24.6″W
- Height: 22m
- Date seeded: Circa 1870
- Date felled: 5 January 2021
- Website: https://www.thehappymantree.org/

The Happy Man Tree was a London plane in the Woodberry Down area of Hackney, London, which was awarded Tree of The Year for 2020 by the Woodland Trust.

The tree was the subject of a dispute between Berkeley Homes and members of the local community over plans for it to be cut down to enable new home construction. A petition to save the tree with 22,000 signatures was delivered to the Mayor of Hackney in June 2020, with the high court granting an injunction to stop protesters blocking the demolition work granted two days later. The tree was ultimately cut down in January 2021.

== History and description ==
The Happy Man Tree was situated just off Seven Sisters Road in Hackney. It can be seen on an Ordnance Survey map dating from 1870. It was named due to its proximity to a now-demolished flat-roofed pub called the Happy Man.

A 2019 arboricultural report details that at that time it was a mature tree of good physiological and structural condition. It was described as a tree of "high quality with an estimated remaining life expectancy of at least 40 years" and a "particularly good example" of its species.

In addition to its Tree of the Year award, it was also The Guardian newspaper's tree of the week in July 2020.

The tree was around 150 years old when it was felled as part of the Woodberry Down Estate regeneration project in January 2021.

== Controversial felling ==
Berkeley Homes was involved in a dispute with environmental campaigners over the tree; the developer wanted to remove it as part of regeneration work on Woodberry Down estate.

Hackney residents started to camp overnight by the tree on 19 May 2020 after there were signs that work to cut it down was beginning, such as workmen putting fences around the tree. That day, the Mayor of Hackney, Philip Glanville tweeted an apology for the distress caused, explaining that "the tree is not being felled today", and saying that he had asked for an urgent update, acknowledging that there had not been responses to emails received and the petition.

A group of local residents formed an association, Friends of the Happy Man Tree, to launch a petition to save the tree. They also launched a crowdfunding campaign to cover the costs of a legal challenge to prevent the tree from being cut down.

As part of the campaign, local community members installed artworks at the site, hung a banner with the hashtag #NoticeThisTree, decorated the tree with lights and a disco ball and had a professional flautist play in the tree.

On 24 June, protesters delivered the petition to save the tree with 22,000 signatures and an axe made from papier-mâché to the Labour Mayor of Hackney, asking him if he was "prepared to strike the first blow". Hackney Council argued that the tree would cause "design harm and reduction in affordable housing", with a spokesperson for Berkeley claiming that felling the tree would "enable the delivery of 584 much needed new homes, including 243 affordable homes, many of which are for people living in substandard accommodation elsewhere on Woodberry Down".

Berkeley Homes and Hackney Council sought an injunction against the peaceful protesters, who were blocking the removal of the tree. Supporters of the tree were "devastated" when this injunction to stop protesters blocking their demolition work was granted by the High Court on 26 June 2020.

The injunction became active in December 2020, prompting the Hackney Gazette to report that it "could be felled 'imminently'".

Mayor Philip Glanville said that, while a way to avoid removing this tree without delays to the development could not be found, there would instead be 175 new trees planted, along with creation of a new public park and "the equivalent of 19 tennis courts of new open spaces". Berkeley say they will be "increasing biodiversity in the area by over 150 per cent".

== Tree of the Year ==
During England's spring COVID-19 lockdown, the tree was nominated for the Woodland Trust's annual Tree of the Year contest by parents and children who pass it on the way to school, with The Ecologist reporting that those who nominated it "believe it is vital that a tree which plays a part in making the air cleaner for the community is saved".

After shortlisting by an independent panel of judges, the public "overwhelmingly" voted the Happy Man Tree as England's winner. It beat nine shortlisted rivals, including runner up, the Grantham oak, whose own encounter with housing planning was referenced in the Woodland Trust's announcement of the Happy Man Tree's win. The 2020 contest saw double the number of trees nominated by members of the public than in previous years, which Darren Moorcroft, chief executive of the Woodland Trust, attributed to lockdowns causing people to take more note of nature on their doorsteps.

As part of the award, the Friends of the Happy Man Tree campaign group was given a £1,000 tree care award by the People's Postcode Lottery. The group said it was exploring using the funds to raise awareness about the value of mature trees in the local area.

In the announcement of the award's winner, Adam Cormack, head of campaigning for the Woodland Trust, acknowledged the Berkeley development's "great work" to provide "important social housing". However, he also said that "given the developer's own admission that this tree could have been retained if plans were amended earlier in the consultation process, we must call this out for being a poor decision". He believes the tree's legacy should be that England's planning system "should protect existing trees and local voices must be listened to when decisions on local trees and woods are made".

== Gallery ==
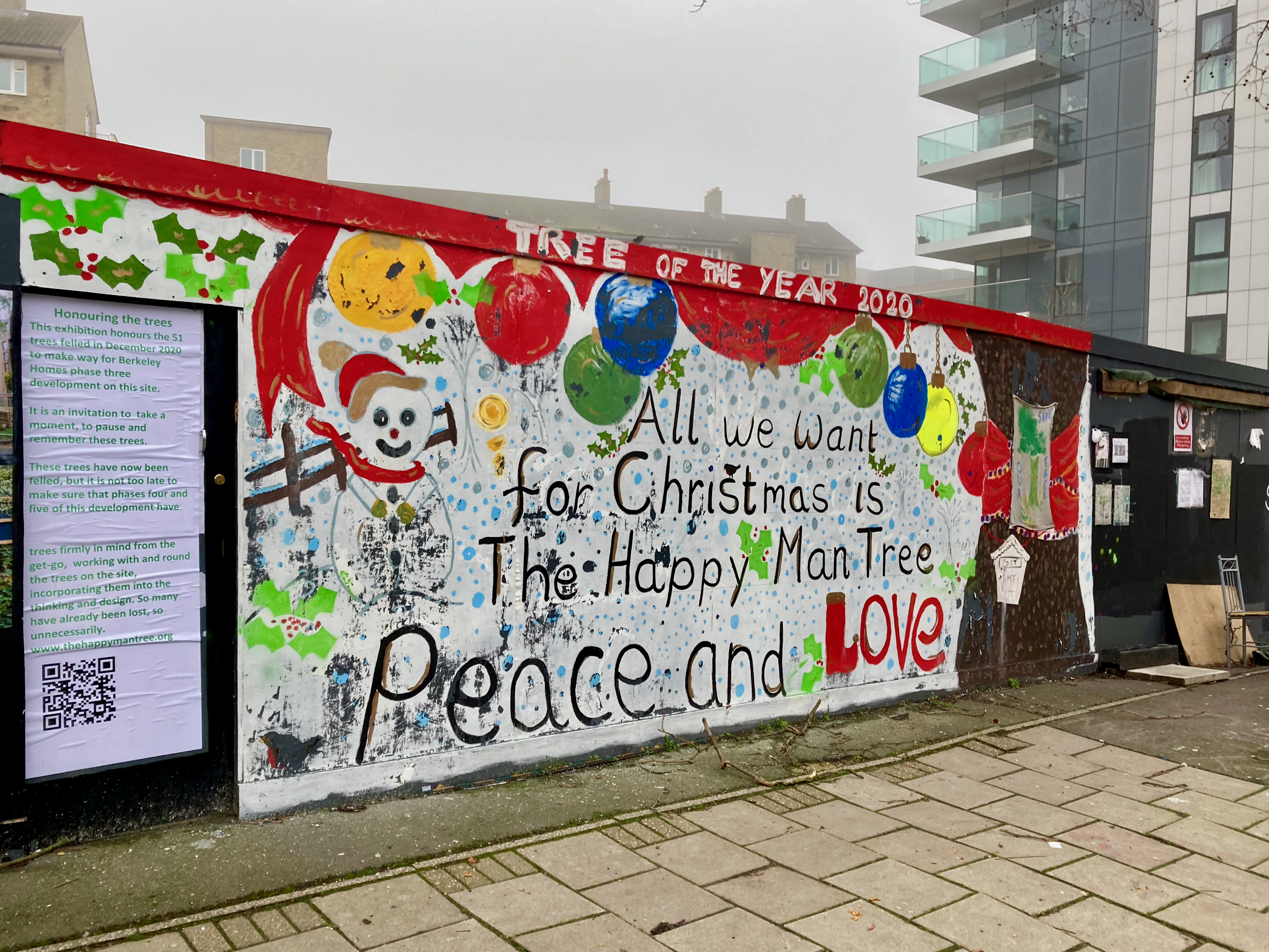
Christmas mural at the site of the tree

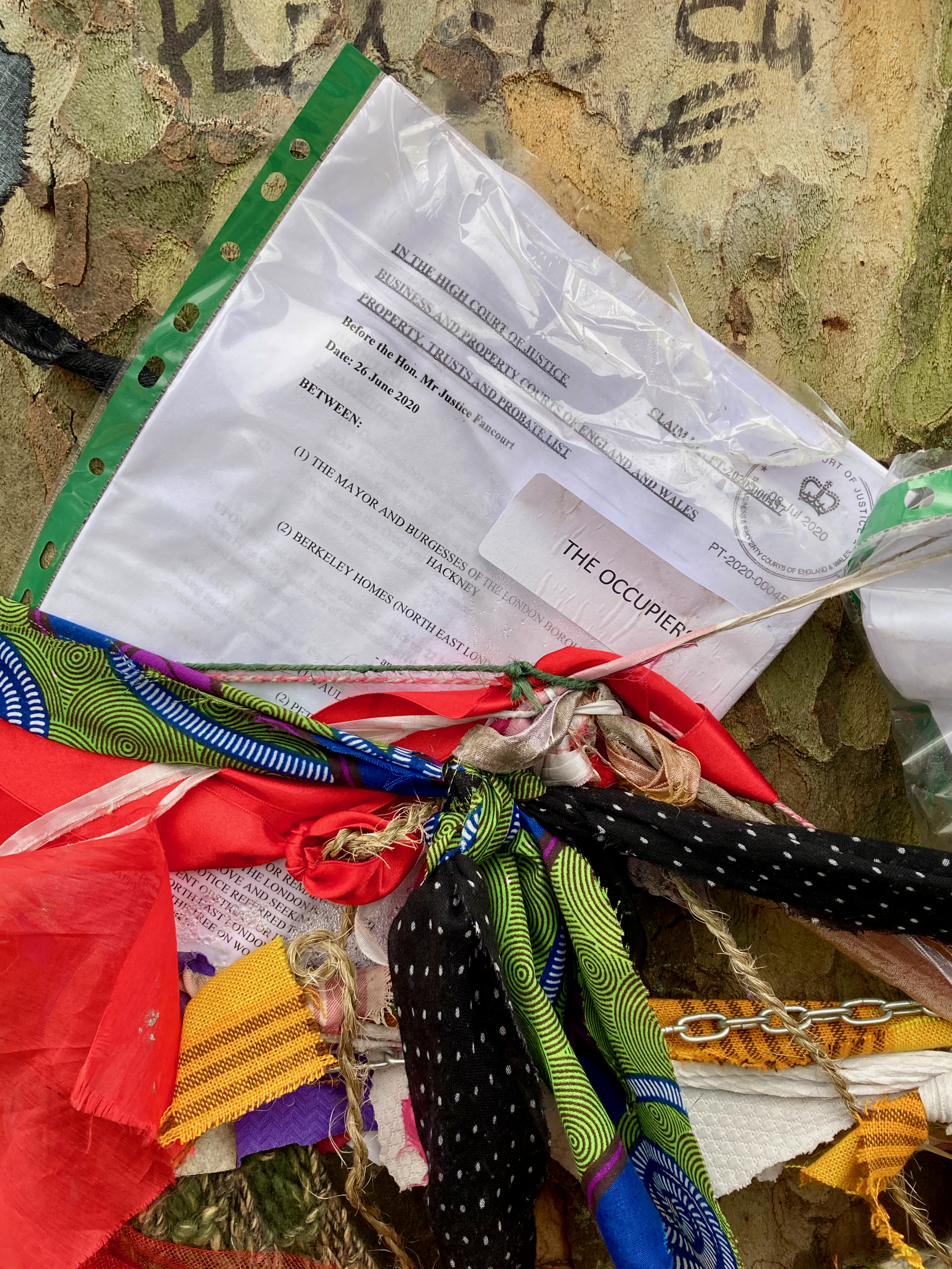
High court injunction documents tied to tree

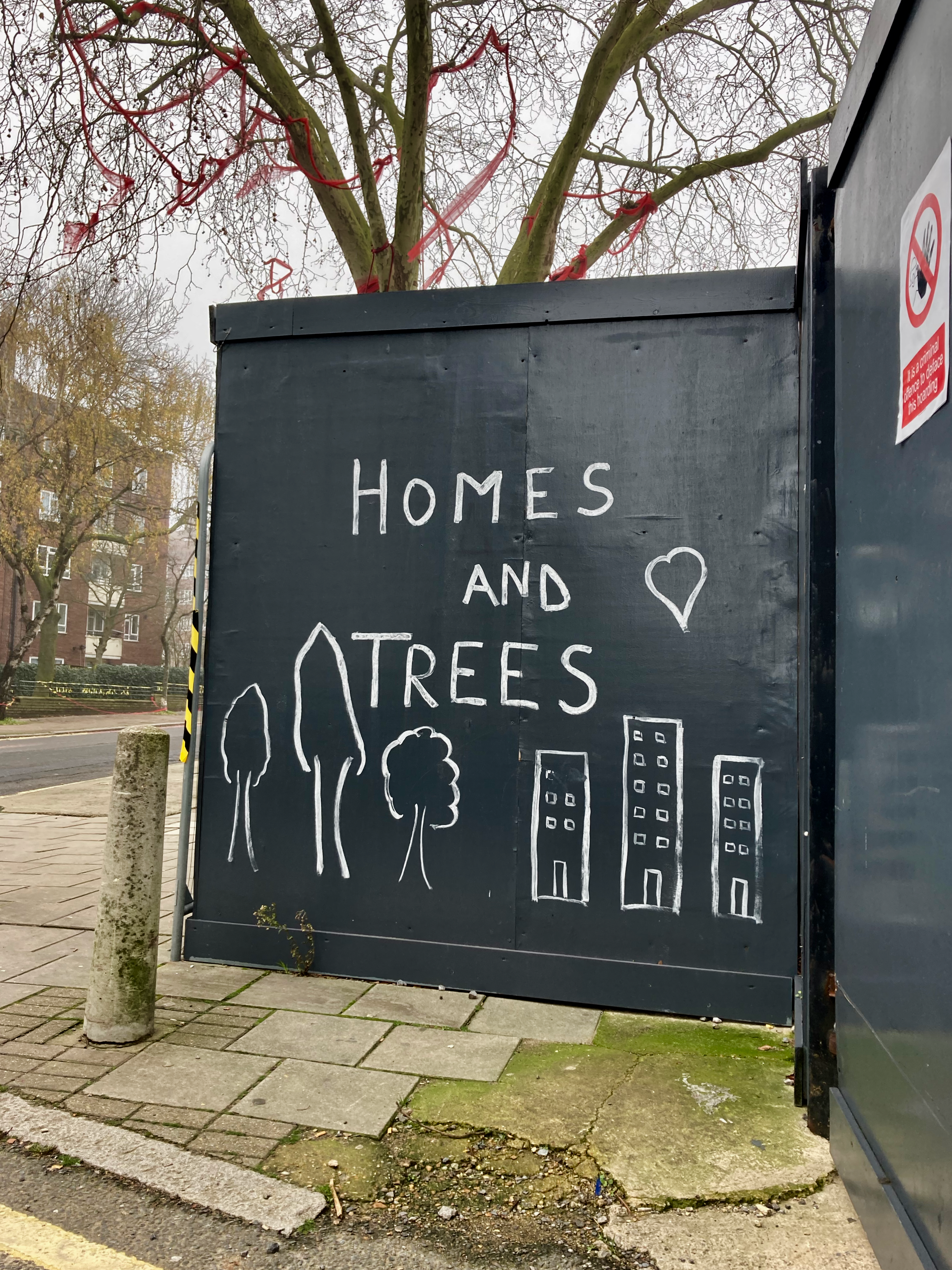
Message from protesters

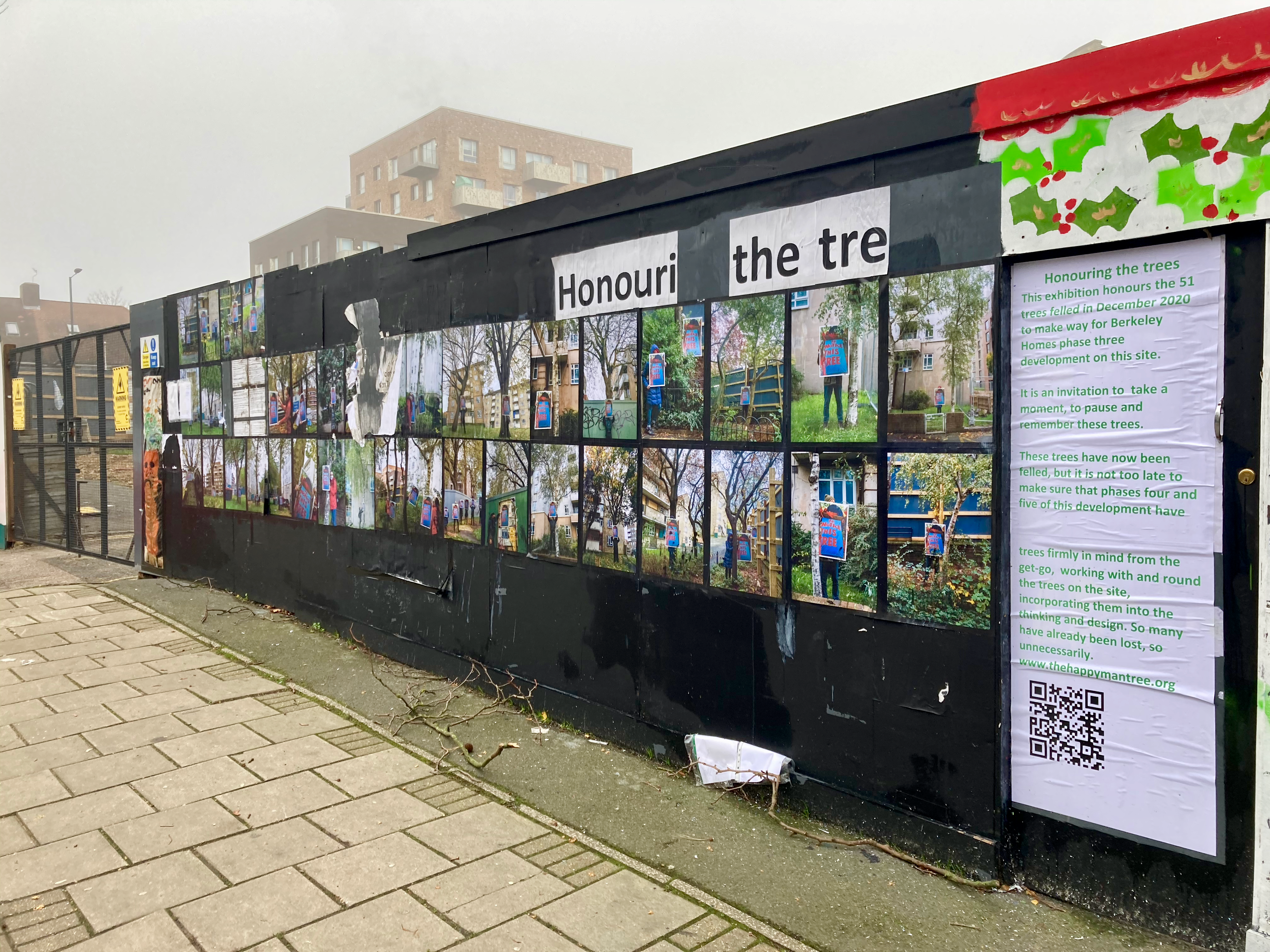
Exhibition honouring the 51 trees cut down for the Berkeley development

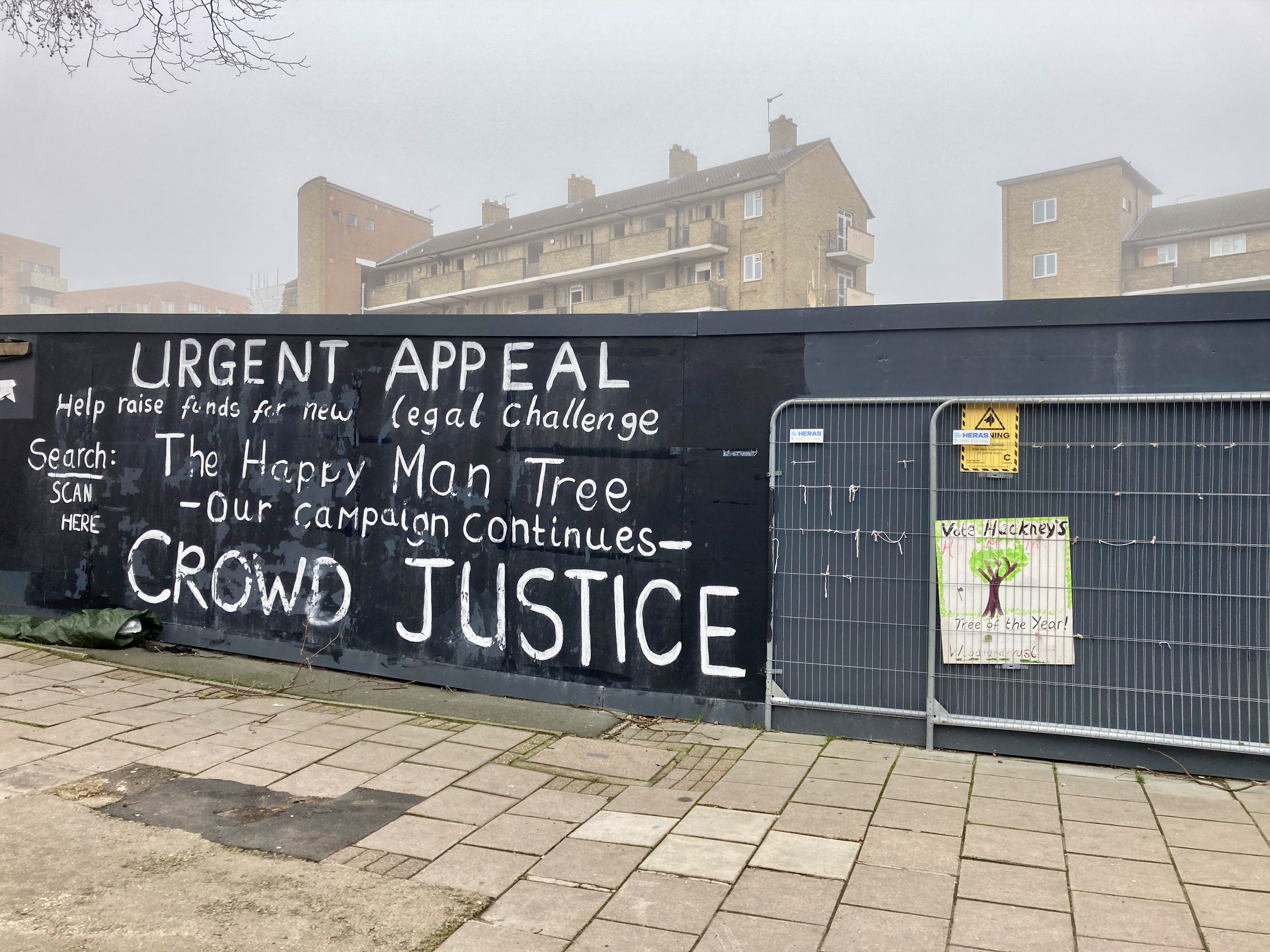
Message from protesters

== See also ==
- List of individual trees
- Cubbington Pear Tree – tree cut down in September 2020 despite a parliamentary petition against this receiving 20,000 signatures.
