= Tony Pidgley =

English businessman (1947–2020)

Tony Pidgley CBE
- Born: Anthony William Pidgley; 6 August 1947; Surrey, United Kingdom
- Died: 26 June 2020 (aged 72)
- Occupation: Businessman

Anthony William Pidgley CBE (6 August 1947 – 26 June 2020) was an English businessman. He was the founder and chairman of Berkeley Group Holdings, one of the UK's largest housebuilding businesses. According to The Sunday Times Rich List in 2019, Pidgley was worth £335 million.

== Career ==
Anthony Pidgley was born in 1947 in Surrey to a single mother, and then adopted from Barnardos. He spent his early life living in a disused railway carriage. He worked with his parents cutting down trees and selling the logs.

Pidgley left home in 1962 and founded a haulage business which he expanded until it had 40 lorries and then sold it to Crest Nicholson in 1968. He then worked for Crest Nicholson for seven years. In 1976, he established Berkeley Group Holdings which he expanded until it was one of the UK's largest housebuilders. Berkeley specialises in executive style homes. He has since seen off a bid for his business from his son.

In 2016 Bloomberg referenced research from the previous year that had reported Tony Pidgley to be the second highest paid CEO of the FTSE 100 behind Martin Sorrell, with a pay packet of £23.3 million.

=== Honours ===
He was appointed Commander of the Order of the British Empire (CBE) in the 2013 New Year Honours for services to the Housing Sector and the community.

Pidgley received an honorary doctorate from Heriot-Watt University in 2013.

== Personal life ==
He married twice, most recently to Sarah Hill, and had two children by each marriage. They resided in a sixteenth-century house set in 100 acres (0.40 km^{2}) in Windsor. Pidgley donated more than £2,000 to the Conservative Party, while his wife Sarah donated £35,000 to the Conservative Party between 2017 and 2020. He died on 26 June 2020, after suffering a stroke.
