= Bearing Specialists Association =

American industry trade group

Bearing Specialists Association (BSA) is an industry trade group of distributors of bearings. It is based in Glen Ellyn, Illinois, and is managed by CM Services, an association management company.

It publishes a self-study guide and a number of technical publications, and organizes an annual meeting for its members.
