= BSA Manufacturing =

- Company type: Private
- Industry: Manufacturing
- Founded: 1995
- Headquarters: Malaysia
- Products: aluminum alloy wheel

BSA Manufacturing Sdn Bhd formed in 1995, is a Malaysian manufacturer of aluminum alloy wheels. The company started as an importer of alloy wheels from Germany, Italy, England, Brazil, Japan, Thailand and Taiwan, and later manufactured its own products. The Company's line of business includes the manufacturing of motor vehicle parts and accessories

BSA became the first Malaysian company to combine the use of Japanese technology with Hi-Tech Robotic Casting machine for alloy wheels manufacturing. Its alloy wheels are used in over 62 countries, including in Europe, North and South America.

BSA sponsored Alex Yoong for his drive with the Minardi F1 team in 2002, along with other Malaysian companies.
