= Business Services Association =

BSA – The Business Services Association
- Founded: 1993
- Headquarters: Fleet Street; London, EC4; United Kingdom
- Location: United Kingdom
- Members: 83 (2025)
- Website: bsa-org.com

The Business Services Association (BSA) is the leading UK trade organisation for businesses and outsourced service providers across the private and public sectors. It has a focus on policy and research work related to facilities management, construction and infrastructure services, business process outsourcing, information and communications technology (ICT), digital services, and managed public services. It has 83 members who have a combined UK turnover of £30 billion and employ 500,000 employees in the UK. BSA members employ around 2 million people globally and their worldwide turnover is some £80 billion.

Its chief executive is Mark Fox.

== Work ==
The BSA has commented publicly on a range of topics, including transparency in business, VAT levels for public service providers, and the role of outsourcing in delivering public services. It publishes an Annual Review of the Business Services Sector, which outlines the economic and social contribution of the sector to the UK.

The BSA submits statements to government ahead of the Autumn Statement and Spending Reviews and responds to consultations from the Scottish and UK Governments. It is a signatory of the Armed Forces Corporate Covenant, Let Britain Fly, and makes annual statements to the Department for Environment, Food and Rural Affairs on sustainable palm oil.

In 2015, the Business Services Association launched the Responsible Cleaner Scheme for companies in the contract cleaning sector. It promotes the welfare and development of cleaners and the professionalisation of the industry.

The BSA commissions research by Oxford Economics, which has shown that the business services sector accounts for 8 percent of all gross value added UK economic output and supports 3.3 million jobs in the UK.

In late December 2023, the BSA was approached by the Department for Business and Trade (DBT) to discuss a new report on the business services sector.

The project looked at the sector’s size, characteristics, and priorities in relation to growth and investment. The report therefore provides an overview of the key characteristics and contributions of the business services sector to the UK economy.
