= Pre-packaged insolvency =

Kind of bankruptcy procedure where a restructuring plan has already been agreed

Pre-packaged insolvency (a "pre-pack") is a type of bankruptcy procedure, where a restructuring plan is agreed upon in advance of a company declaring its insolvency. In the United States pre-packs are often used in a Chapter 11 filing. In the United Kingdom, pre-packs have become popular since the Enterprise Act 2002, which has made administration the dominant insolvency procedure. Such arrangements are also available in Canada under the Companies' Creditors Arrangement Act.

== United Kingdom ==
The term "pre-pack sale" has been defined by the Association of Business Recovery Professionals as "an arrangement under which the sale of all or part of a company’s business or assets is negotiated with a purchaser prior to the appointment of an administrator, and the administrator effects the sale immediately on, or shortly after, his appointment". The difference between a pre-pack sale and a normal sale is that in a normal sale the administrator markets the business and negotiates the terms of the sale after his appointment.

The reasons an administrator sells on a pre-pack basis, rather than after post-appointment marketing, vary from case to case, but they often involve the following considerations. A pre-pack sale avoids the costs of trading (which means creditors receive more back), and indeed, the company and the administrator may not have the funds to trade. It also avoids the administrator taking on the risks associated with trading. The value of the business may deteriorate during administration trading.

There may be other factors to prevent trading, such as regulatory problems.

The courts have held that an administrator can sell the company's assets immediately upon his appointment, without court approval or the approval of the creditors, and he can do so even if the majority creditor objects. Courts have even approved transactions that, as a "necessary evil", have made payments to the former management while leaving little or nothing to unsecured creditors.

In January 2009, the Association of Business Recovery Professionals issued Statement of Insolvency Practice 16 to require insolvency practitioners acting as administrators to disclose a number of matters to all creditors as soon as possible after the completion of the sale. This was done in an attempt to provide greater transparency to creditors.

On 1 November 2013, following a government-commissioned review, a new Statement of Insolvency Practice 16 was introduced. It requires administrators to disclose the following:

- The source of the administrator’s initial introduction and the date of the introduction
- The extent of the administrator’s involvement prior to appointment
- The alternative courses of action that were considered by the administrator, with an explanation of possible financial outcomes
- Whether efforts were made to consult with major creditors
- Why it was not appropriate to trade the business and offer it for sale as a going concern, during the administration
- Details of requests made to potential funders to fund working capital requirements
- Details of registered charges and dates of creation
- If the business or business assets have been acquired from an insolvency practitioner within the previous 24 months, or longer if the administrator deems that relevant to creditors’ understanding, the administrator should disclose both the details of that transaction and whether the administrator, administrator’s firm or associates were involved
- Any marketing activities conducted by the company and/or the administrator and the outcome of those activities
- The names and professional qualifications of any valuers and confirmation they have confirmed their independence
- Any valuations obtained of the business or the underlying assets
- A summary of the basis of the valuation adopted by the administrator or his valuers/advisers
- The rationale for the basis of the valuations obtained and an explanation of the sale of the assets compared to those valuations. If no valuation has been obtained, the reason for not having done so and how the administrator was satisfied as to the value of the assets
- The date of the transaction
- The identity of the purchaser
- Any connection between the purchaser and the directors, shareholders or secured creditors of the company or their associates
- The names of any directors, or former directors, of the company who are involved in the management or ownership of the purchaser, or of any other entity into which any of the assets are transferred
- In transactions impacting on more than one related company (e.g. a group transaction) the administrator should ensure that the disclosure is sufficient to enable a transparent explanation (for instance, allocation of consideration paid)
- Whether any directors had given guarantees for amounts due from the company to a prior financier, and whether that financier is financing the new business
- Details of the assets involved and the nature of the transaction
- The consideration for the transaction, terms of payment, and any condition of the contract that could materially affect the consideration
- Sale consideration disclosed under broad asset valuation categories and split between fixed and floating charge realisations
- Any options, buy-back arrangements or similar conditions attached to the contract of sale
- If the sale is part of a wider transaction, a description of the other aspects of the transaction.

The main benefit of a pre-pack administration is the 'continuity' of the business - the company is protected by the court. This gets rid of debts and contracts. It does not get rid of employees due to the Transfer of Undertakings (Protection of Employment) Regulations 2006 (TUPE). Another big advantage is that the cost of the process is lower than trading administration, as the administrators do not need to find funding to trade the business. The downside of a pre-pack administration is that it can attract negative publicity if the former directors are seen to be shedding liabilities.

The Insolvency Service monitors compliance with SIP 16. Its reports show that in 2010 it reported 10 insolvency practitioners to their licensing bodies, and in 2011 it reported 21.

== United States ==
In the United States, typically the term pre-packaged bankruptcy is used instead of pre-packaged insolvency. A conventional bankruptcy case is one in which the debtor files for Chapter 11 relief without having agreed in advance to the terms of a plan of reorganization with its creditors. During the course of the Chapter 11 case, the debtor or, if the debtor does not retain the exclusive right to propose a plan, a creditor or creditor group may formulate and propose a plan of reorganization. A company undergoing Chapter 11 reorganization is effectively operating under the protection of the court until it emerges. An example is the airline industry; in 2006, over half the industry's seating capacity was on airlines that were in Chapter 11.

In a pre-packaged case, the plan proponents will have secured sufficient support from creditors to confirm their plan of reorganization prior to filing for Chapter 11 reorganization. Pre-packaged plans of reorganization virtually always impair (i.e. pay less than in full) one or more classes of creditors, and so in order to ensure that the plan can be confirmed by the bankruptcy court, the plan proponents must secure the support of at least two-thirds in amount and more than one-half in number of at least one such impaired class, in addition to ensuring the plan complies with all other requirements for confirmation. Two procedurally difficult aspects of the process are the announcement (which must be structured so as not to trigger contractual termination provisions) and getting the requisite creditor approval.

In 2009, a new entity completed the purchase of continuing operations, assets and trademarks of General Motors as a part of the 'pre-packaged' Chapter 11 reorganization. As ranked by total assets, GM's bankruptcy marks one of the largest corporate Chapter 11 bankruptcies in US history. The Chapter 11 filing was the fourth-largest in US history, following Lehman Brothers Holdings Inc., Washington Mutual and WorldCom Inc. A new entity with the backing of the United States Treasury was formed to acquire profitable assets, under section 363 of the Bankruptcy Code, with the new company planning to issue an initial public offering (IPO) of stock in 2010. The remaining pre-petition creditors claims are paid from the former corporation's assets.

== Criticism ==
A review from Wolverhampton University identified the several criticisms of pre-pack sales. There is a general concern that the pre-pack administrator, in agreeing to the pre-pack in consultation with the company’s management team (and usually its secured creditors), favours the interests of the managers and secured creditors ahead of those of the unsecured creditors. The speed and secrecy of the transaction often lead to a deal being executed, about which the unsecured creditors know nothing and offers them little or no return.

There is often a suspicion that the consideration paid for the business may not have been maximized due to the absence of open marketing. Credit may have been incurred inappropriately prior to the pre-pack and this may not be fully investigated.
