= Ideal Homes =

Ideal Homes may refer to

== Companies ==
- Ideal Homes (UK housebuilder), a defunct British housebuilder
- Ideal Homes (US housebuilder), an American housebuilder
