= Beazer =

Housebuilding business

- Industry: Construction; housebuilding
- Defunct: 2001
- Fate: Acquired
- Successor: Hanson plc
- Headquarters: Bath, Somerset
- Key people: Victor Benjamin, (chairman); Dennis Webb, (CEO)

Beazer was a family business for six generations before expanding in the 1980s into an international housebuilding, construction, and building materials group. After becoming overburdened with debt it was rescued by Hanson plc in 1991. A new Beazer Group, comprising solely the UK housebuilding business, was demerged from Hanson in 1994, and bought by Persimmon plc in 2001.

== History ==
=== Early days ===
The six generations mentioned above can easily be traced with the help of the Census. George Beazer born c. 1783 (refer 1841 and 1851 England census) was living in the little village of Marshfield and the Beazers stayed there for several generations. George's son Henry (1822) was the first to be designated a mason as was Joseph (1844) and then Jesse (1874). Jesse's work consisted largely of repairs to the farms and properties around the village, though he did manage to finance his own house at the age of only 26, an unusual achievement for a mason in those times.

Jesse had eight children but only one son – Cyril H Beazer (1908–1983). Cyril started working for his father at the age of 13, but work was scarce and Cyril later moved to Bath to work for local firms, becoming a mason himself and then a general foreman. In partnership with a local businessman who owned a small plot of land, Cyril built two houses and thus began the building business that was to bear the name C.H.Beazer. During the 1930s Cyril employed no more than a few men and, in World War II was mainly involved in war damage repair work in Bath; until 1944 when he and his men were directed to undertake similar work in London.

The early post-war period continued to be dominated by war damage reconstruction in Bath, but the business gradually extended to new build and to the counties around Bath. Reflecting the increased size of the business, C H Beazer (Construction) was incorporated in 1956; Cyril's eldest son, Ralph, joined as a director and the younger brother Brian became a director in 1960. In the event, it was Brian Beazer who took over as managing director in 1968 and it was he who turned this small Bath company into an international construction group.

=== The acquisition years ===
The local firm of Mortimer & Sons, of similar size to C.H. Beazer, was bought, its general construction business complementing what had become Beazer's predominant private housebuilding. In 1971, Beazer made a leap from what had been a predominantly south-west firm by developing a commercial property site in Brussels. Within two years it had property developments in Belgium France and Germany as well as seven schemes in the U.K. Supported by those development profits, in July 1973 C.H. Beazer (Holdings) was floated on the London Stock Exchange, barely months before the onset of the first major post-war recession. Profits fell, there were property write-downs and the dividend was cut in 1976. The years that followed were ones of consolidation before the acquisitions began again at the end of the decade – only this time they were on a much larger scale.

In 1979, Beazer bought the Somerset firm of R.M.Smith, doubling housing output to around 500 a year. Further acquisitions included house builders Monsell Youell and Second City Properties, the property developer M.P. Kent, brick manufacturer Westbrick and prefabricated classroom manufacturer Prattens. By 1984, Beazer had become a volume housebuilder with an output of over 2,000 a year. This was doubled the following year with the purchase of William Leech, taking Beazer to number four in the industry.

Also in 1985 Beazer made its first foray into the US with the purchase of Cohn Communities, a small housebuilder. A failed attempt to buy the UK's largest scaffolding company was followed by the hotly contested purchase of French Kier, a large domestic and international contractor. This was complemented by the acquisition of contracting businesses in Hong Kong and Australia. But all this was to be overshadowed by Beazer's next steps in the USA.

In 1986, Beazer bought the Dallas-based Gifford Hill, the fourth largest cement producer in the US, for £190m. This was quickly followed by the purchase of Koppers for $1.8 billion cash. Koppers was the second largest aggregates business in the USA but it also had a long-standing chemical and wood treatment business with what proved to be significant environmental liabilities. The Beazer group was now financially highly geared and had to face both the worldwide property recession and increasing environmental liabilities – the 1989 accounts contained a provision of over $500m, and rising.

The Beazer solution was to float off Beazer Europe leaving the US operations, Beazer Homes USA, as a separate business. While the pathfinder prospectus was still being circulated, Beazer received a rescue bid from Hanson plc. Hanson's interest was in the building materials part of Beazer and it quickly sold the Kier construction business. In contrast, Beazer's housing was held through the recession and a new Beazer Group, now consisting solely of UK housebuilding, still the fourth largest in the UK, was floated in 1994. This Beazer mark 2 made its own modest acquisitions including paying £35.7 million for the upmarket southern housebuilder Charles Church Developments on 13 May 1996 and by the end of the 1990s it was producing around 8,000 houses a year.

=== Disappearance ===
At the end of 2000, Beazer Group and Bryant Homes proposed a “merger of equals” but this was overtaken by a bid for Bryant from Taylor Woodrow. This left Beazer exposed and in 2001 it was acquired by Persimmon plc for £610m.
