= Westbury (housebuilder) =

British housebuilding company

- Industry: Housebuilding
- Founded: 1965
- Defunct: 2005
- Fate: Acquired
- Successor: Persimmon plc
- Headquarters: Cheltenham, Gloucestershire, England

Westbury plc was a British housebuilding company based in Cheltenham, Gloucestershire. It was listed on the London Stock Exchange and was a constituent of the FTSE 250 Index but was acquired by Persimmon plc in 2005.

== History ==
Westbury was established by the Joiner family in Gloucestershire in 1964. Westbury remained a relatively small operation until 1971, at which point Geoff Hester was recruited to run the business; from that point onwards, Westbury was managed by professional housebuilders from outside the Joiner family. In the aftermath of the 1974 housing recession, the company underwent a period of regional expansion and, by the early 1980s, there were three regions, Gloucester, Bristol and south Wales, building around 1,500 units per year between them. By this point, the Joiner family were keen to realise their equity in the company and it was floated on the London Stock Exchange in 1986. The flotation was almost immediately followed by the acquisition of the Midlands division of Whelmar and the opening of a southern region.

The company was negatively impacted by a recession in the early 1990s. Specifically, Westbury enacted provisions for a sharp decrease in the valuation of Westbury's land bank, which contributed to a pre-tax loss of £15.12 million being incurred in FY 1991. Nevertheless, the firm opted to maintain its volumes throughout this period. During November 1992, Westbury announced a pre-tax profit of £2.6 million, indicating its improving condition; by mid-1994, the firm's house sales had risen to 2,685 units annually, turnover had increased by 15 per cent to £152 million, and it had recorded a pre-tax profit of £8.3 million.

Accordingly, across the mid-to-late 1990s, Westbury resumed its expansion programme, resulting in a series of substantial acquisitions being completed. These included the purchase of Clarke Homes from BICC in 1995; the Manchester-based firm Maunders in 1998; and the southern-centric Prowting in 2002. Several other initiatives were also launched by the company around this period. Specifically, Westbury opted to move into prefabricated housing via the construction of a factory that was capable of producing 5,000 units per year; it also diversified into financial services. However, both of these ventures ran at a loss.

Largely as a result of its acquisitions, Westbury's profits sharply increased during the late 1990s, such as the 49 per cent rise in pre-tax profits recorded in late 1996. Other positive factors included a focus on increased operational efficiency, a shift upmarket, and rising land and house prices at a rate of roughly 10 per cent during this period. In June 1999, the firm announced that pre-tax profits had risen by 44 per cent to £44.1 million.

During November 2005, Westbury received a £643 million takeover approach from Persimmon plc, a larger British housebuilding company, which was accepted by the shareholders and management alike.
