= Christopher Campbell (accountant) =

English accountant (1936–2023)

Christopher James Campbell CBE (2 January 1936 – 19 July 2023) was a British accountant.

== Early life and education ==
Born in Kenton, Middlesex, the younger son of David Campbell and Nettie Phyllis Burgess, he experienced the loss of his mother at the age of eight. He was educated at Epsom College, where he demonstrated proficiency in mathematics, which led him to pursue a career in accountancy.

== Career ==
Campbell served in the Royal Army Pay Corps and the Honourable Artillery Company from 1959 to 1963, achieving the rank of captain-paymaster. His subsequent career in the private sector included a role at Debenhams, where he was appointed as a director. He was also involved with The Bow Group, a conservative think tank, which expanded his network in political and business communities.

In 1989, Campbell was appointed chairman of British Shipbuilders during its transition towards privatisation. During his chairmanship at British Shipbuilders, Campbell faced challenges, particularly with the closure of Northeast Shipbuilders, and led negotiations including a notable lawsuit with Trafalgar House.

His appointment to oversee the privatization of British Rail's non-passenger operations was met with skepticism from some quarters due to his lack of direct experience in the railway industry. His work contributed to the restructuring and privatization of parts of British Rail ahead of the 1997 general election.

== Awards and honours ==
In 1993, Campbell was appointed CBE.
