= William Leech plc =

UK company

- Type: Public company
- Industry: Home building
- Founded: 1934
- Defunct: 1985
- Fate: Acquired
- Successor: Beazer
- Headquarters: Tyneside, United Kingdom
- Key people: William Leech (Chairman and founder)

William Leech plc was a British housebuilding company based in Tyneside. The company operated from 1934 until it was acquired in 1985.

== History ==
The company was established by William Leech, a former window cleaner in 1934 as William Leech (Builders) Ltd. It bought very large landholdings in the Cramlington area and was first listed on the London Stock Exchange in 1976 when its name was changed to William Leech plc. It achieved an output of 2,500 units in 1979. It announced a merger with Bellway in 1981 but this was called off within days: "the lifestyle of the two firms looked pretty incompatible".

The company was then acquired by Beazer in 1985. The company retained its brand and Newcastle head office until Beazer itself was acquired by Persimmon in 2001, following which both brands were phased out. The Leech Homes name was revived by Persimmon in 2005 as a brand aimed at housing for the over-55s. As of 2025, it remains registered with Companies House as a dormant company, still in the ownership of Persimmon plc.

== Sources ==
- Ball, Michael (1983). Housing Policy and Economic Power: The Political Economy of Owner Occupation. Routledge. ISBN 978-0416352801.
- Cullingworth, Barry (1970). British Planning: 50 Years of Urban and Regional Policy. Continuum International Publishing Group. ISBN 978-0485006049.
