= Grace Beverley =

British businesswoman and social media influencer (born 1997)

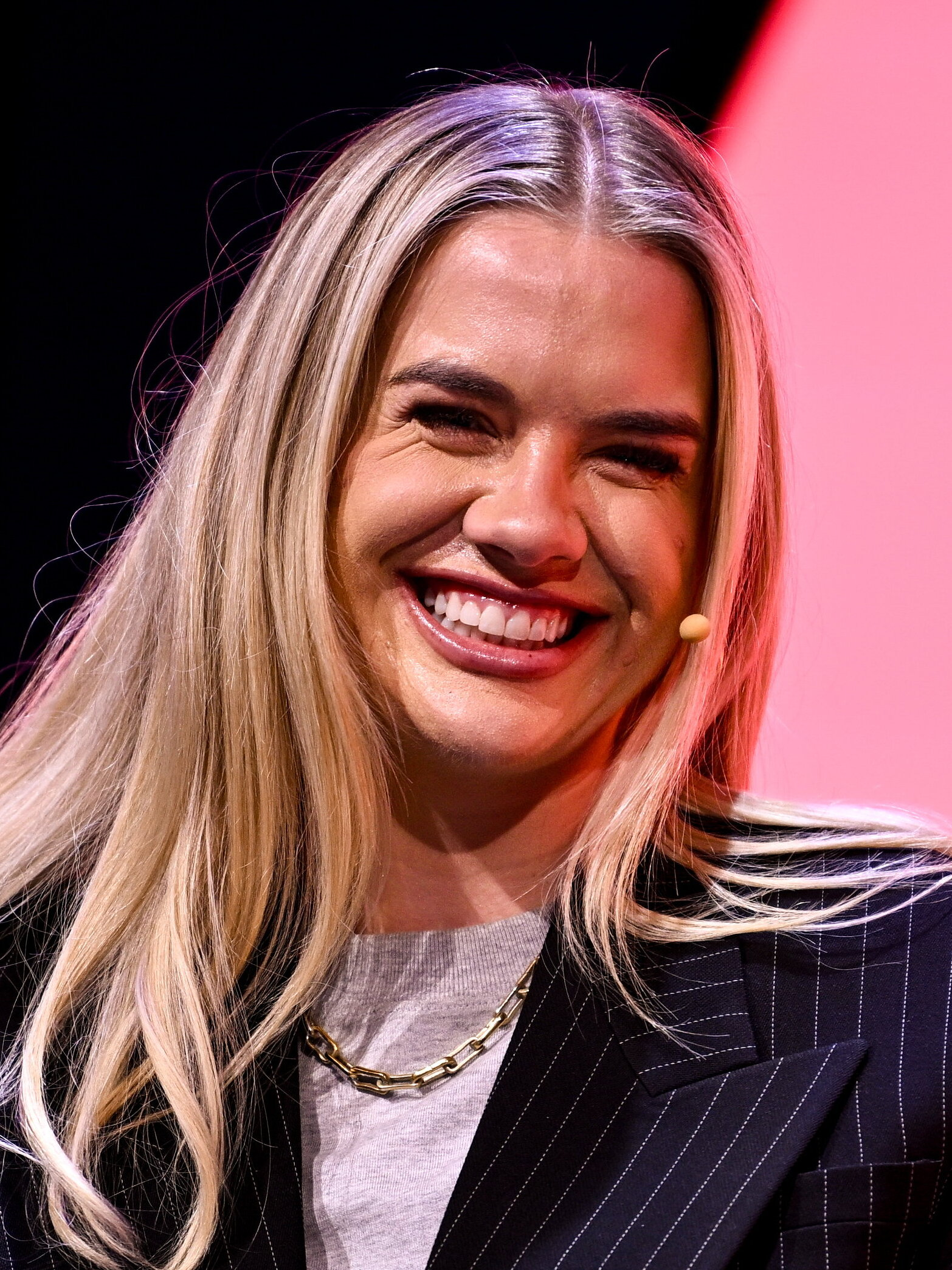
- Beverley in 2024
- Born: Grace Margaret Beverley; 16 February 1997 (age 29); London, England
- Education: St Peter's College, Oxford
- Occupations: Influencer; Entrepreneur; Podcaster
- Known for: TALA; Shreddy
- Relatives: Sir Nigel Broackes (grandfather)

Grace Margaret Beverley is a British entrepreneur, influencer and podcaster. She is the founder of TALA, Shreddy and The Productivity Method. Formerly known online by her moniker GraceFitUK, Beverley founded TALA and Shreddy whilst studying music at St Peter's College, Oxford.

== Life and career ==
Grace Margaret Beverley was born in London, England, on 16 February 1997 to Victoria Broackes, a curator at the Victoria and Albert Museum (daughter of multimillionaire businessman Sir Nigel Broackes), and Peter Beverley, the head of a business consultancy firm. She is the third of four daughters. Beverley attended Francis Holland School and St Paul's Girls' School. As a teenager, she was head chorister at Salisbury Cathedral. She received a choral scholarship at St Peter's College, Oxford, where she studied music as an undergraduate, graduating in 2019, and receiving her Master of Arts in 2023.

At the age of 18, Beverley began to grow her social media accounts - primarily YouTube and Instagram under the name GraceFitUK. She started the accounts while on a gap year, working as an analyst for IBM. She marketed herself as a lifestyle vlogger with a focus on fitness, and veganism. She continued to publish to the profiles once she started studying at Oxford University a year later. She now has an audience of over 1 million followers on these platforms. She also sold resistance bands and workout plans and worked with international brands such as fitness company Gymshark. Beverley was on the 2020 Forbes 30 Under 30 Europe Retail & Ecommerce list. In 2020, Beverley was awarded the James Joyce Award by University College Dublin. YMU talent agency signed Grace Beverley in April 2024.

Beverley launched sportswear and fashion brand TALA in 2019 with the support of an influencer brand-building company. It markets itself as providing ethically made quality clothing. According to the company, most garments are made from recycled materials such as plastic bottles upcycled into yarn, or factory offcuts. TALA was launched and turned over £6.2 million in its first year. In April 2021, Beverley re-acquired the business. She appointed Morgan Fowles as managing director of TALA in 2021 to help her find investments. Tala raised £4.2 million in December 2021, in funding led by Active Ventures and Venrex, and the team grew to over 40 people. In 2022, it raised $5.7m in an investment round with venture capital firms. TALA's sales were in eight figures for 2023, up 100 per cent from 2022. In 2023, Fowles was named TALA's CEO.

In 2022, Beverley founded The Productivity Method, which sells planners and diaries. The planners follow the productivity model set out in Beverley's book Working Hard, Hardly Working: How to achieve more, stress less and feel fulfilled. In July 2024, Beverley teamed up with Jake Browne and Gary Meehan to launch Retrograde, an AI-powered talent management system for content creators. Beverley also founded the fitness product and technology brand Shreddy. Users pay that firm a monthly fee to access exercise classes and meal plans on the mobile app and can buy the equipment required to complete the classes. Shreddy also sells a range of dietary supplements and protein bars which are stocked in supermarkets and pharmacies. Some equipment now sold by Shreddy was originally designed for one of Beverley's previous businesses, B_ND, which focused on resistance bands for home and gym use. The B_ND concept was assimilated into the Shreddy brand in 2020.

== Personal life ==
In August 2025, Beverley married fashion photographer Amar Daved.

== Publications ==
Beverley, Grace (2021). Working Hard, Hardly Working. Penguin. ISBN 9781529159004.
