= Persimmon plc =

British housebuilding company

- Type: Public limited company
- Traded as: LSE: PSN; FTSE 250 Component
- Industry: Housebuilding
- Founded: 1972; 54 years ago
- Headquarters: York, England, UK
- Key people: Roger Devlin (Chairman); Dean Finch (CEO)
- Revenue: ▲£3,751.3 million (2025)
- Operating income: ▲£423.8 million (2025)
- Net income: ▲£285.7 million (2025)
- Number of employees: 4,731 (2024)
- Subsidiaries: Charles Church; Westbury Partnerships; Space 4
- Website: www.persimmonhomes.com

Persimmon plc is a British housebuilding company, headquartered in York, England. It is listed on the London Stock Exchange and is a constituent of the FTSE 250 Index.

== History ==
Persimmon was founded by Duncan Davidson in 1972. The company is named after a horse which won the 1896 Derby and St. Leger for the Prince of Wales (the future Edward VII). After leaving George Wimpey, Davidson had formed Ryedale Homes in 1965, selling it to Comben Homes in 1972 for £600,000. Davidson restarted development again in the Yorkshire area; Persimmon began to expand regionally with the formation of an Anglian division in 1976 followed by operations in the Midlands and the south-west. In 1984, Persimmon acquired Tony Fawcett’s company Sketchmead; Fawcett had been a director of Ryedale and he became deputy managing director at Persimmon. The enlarged company was floated on the London Stock Exchange in 1985, by which time the Company was building around 1,000 houses per year.

Steady regional expansion proceeded throughout the late 1980s, taking volumes up to 2,000 homes per year by 1988. By the start of the 1990s, the company was regarded as one of the safest housebuilders from a stockholder's perspective. During April 1990, the managing director of Persimmon, Norman Lilley, was killed after his aircraft exploded mid-flight. One year later, the company conducted a rights issue to raise £33 million for land purchases. It was negatively impacted by the early 1990s recession, although sales figures showed signs of recovery as early as March 1992.

During February 1993, John White was appointed chief executive of Persimmon in place of Davidson, who continued to hold the position of executive chairman. By thus point, the firm was selling roughly 2,300 houses per year, and recording an annual profit of £10.16 million, which was considerably down from the peak figure achieved for 1989–1990 of £32 million. In March 1994, shortly after Persimmon's announcement that it had almost doubled its pre-tax profits year-on-year to £18.6 million, it raised £49 million from shareholders to expand its land bank by a third in preparation for future development. The positive results achieved around this time were attributed to favourable market conditions, including falling costs and a gentle rate of inflation on house prices; Persimmon was able to cut selling costs down to £3,700 per unit in early 1994.

During late 1995, Persimmon made the first of a series of major acquisitions. Ideal Homes, once the largest housebuilder in the country and then part of Trafalgar House was bought for £176 million, giving the Group a much stronger presence in the south-east. Amid the acquisition of Ideal Homes, Davidson issued a public denial that family influence had played a role in the purchase. Following the acquisition, Persimmon was able to increase its margins and recorded a pre-tax profit of £33.1 million for 1996. Around this time, the firm's construction strategy was centred on the principle of 'quality over quantity'.

During April 1998, it completed the purchase of the Scottish housing business of John Laing Group in exchange for £18 million, increasing its Scottish landbank by roughly one-third to almost 3,000 plots. Another acquisition was of the Scottish housebuilding business Tilbury Douglas Homes. In 1999, the firm launched a new subsidiary focused on interurban development. Throughout the late 1990s, Persimmon recorded a series of increases to its profits.

In early 2001, Persimmon acquired Beazer Homes UK in exchange for £612 million, which brought the company's annual output to over 12,000 homes per year. The deal came about after Beazer and Bryant announced a 'merger of equals' that was to create a new house builder called Domus. However, Taylor Woodrow stepped in with a £556 million bid for Bryant while Persimmon bought Beazer. The acquisition of Beazer brought with it the upmarket housing business Charles Church; months after the purchase, Persimmon incurred considerable losses as well as legal action that related to Church.

In January 2006, Persimmon completed the acquisition of Westbury, another listed UK house builder, for a total consideration of £643 million. Around the same timeframe, it also purchased the regional house builder Senator Homes in exchange for £25 million. As a result of its acquisitions, the firm became the largest housebuilder in the UK.

The company was heavily impacted by the onset of the Great Recession; in 2008 alone, it lost £780 million along with impairments totalling £905 million. However, it returned to profitability in early 2009. In early 2013, Persimmon recorded a near-doubling of profits and total revenues of £1.72 billion; some of these gains were attributed to the British government's Help to Buy scheme.

During 2019, the firm completed 15,855 homes and recorded an annual profit of £1.09 billion, which was the largest ever achieved by a British housebuilder; however, sales were declining amid recent reputational damage to Persimmon much of which was due to alleged quality control issues.

In May 2024, Persimmon was reported to be considering a bid for Legal & General's subsidiary Cala Homes, which was valued at around £1 billion.

In the years following the Grenfell Tower fire, Persimmon, along with other housebuilders, made financial provisions to remediate fire safety problems on properties it had previously constructed. In 2024, it spent £60 million on building safety remediation; a January 2025 trading update revealed the firm had spent £120 million on building safety works, with further work required on 30% of known developments. It completed 10,664 homes in 2024, up from 9,922 completions in 2023.

== Operations ==
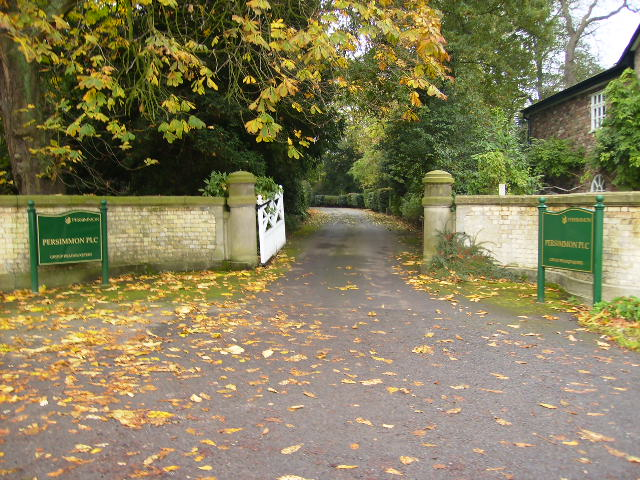
Driveway entrance to the offices of Persimmon plc in York

It builds homes under the Persimmon Homes, Charles Church and Westbury Partnerships brands.

== Criticism ==
=== Build quality ===
Persimmon has regularly been criticised for the poor build quality of some of its homes.

In 2008, a boy was killed by a falling mantelpiece. Persimmon, which sub-contracted company KD Childs to fit the fireplaces, had not checked the standards and had never received documents about how fireplaces were fitted. A mantelpiece had previously fallen at another Persimmon Home but was treated as a "one-off" incident.

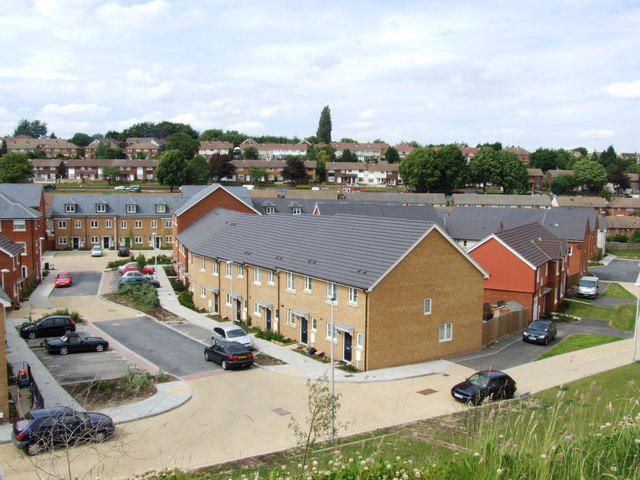
Medway Gate development, by the South East branch of Persimmon

Persimmon's build quality was the subject of a Channel 4 Dispatches documentary broadcast on 15 July 2019. In August 2019, Persimmon appointed an independent team of construction quality inspectors to ensure its homes are built to required standards.

In April 2019, Persimmon launched an independent review of customer care and quality of work following criticism. Persimmon had been ranked the lowest major housebuilder in the Home Builders Federation annual customer satisfaction survey. The review, published in December 2019, criticised Persimmon for not having minimum construction standards, increasing the risk of build defects, with a "systemic nationwide failure" of missing and/or incorrectly installed fire cavity barriers in its timber frame properties. In March 2021, Persimmon CEO Dean Finch announced plans to double the firm's team of independent quality inspectors to over 60 by the end of 2021.

In 2021, Persimmon built a block of properties the wrong way round in Colchester. The local authority required them to ensure the building was completed to the original designs submitted.

=== Censorship ===
In 2019, Persimmon paid to take control of and then shut down a Facebook group, called Persimmon Homes Unhappy Customers, which detailed complaints about the company, and had almost 14,000 members. The company defended deleting the group.

=== Health and safety failure ===
In 2001, Persimmon was fined £125,000 after an employee was crushed to death. HSE investigating inspector Tony Mitchell said: "Companies need to ensure that all safety devices are fully operational. In this case properly fitted interlocks would have prevented access to the enclosure, and saved a life".

=== Executive pay ===
In December 2017, Persimmon's chairman, Nicholas Wrigley, resigned over his role in awarding Jeff Fairburn, the CEO, a £128 million bonus. The Persimmon bonus scheme was believed to be the UK's "most generous ever", scheduled to pay more than £800 million to 150 senior staff from 31 December 2016.

In October 2018, Fairburn received widespread criticism after refusing to discuss the bonus awarded to him the previous year. When the bonus was awarded he said he would forgo half his shares: the final bonus which therefore was awarded £75 million. This was the largest bonus award by a listed UK company in history. Fairburn has said he would give a "substantial proportion" of the bonus to charity; however no details of the charities were given (and no charitable involvement could be identified three years later). He left the following month in a decision that the company described as being by "mutual agreement and at the request of the company".

=== Late payment ===
In April 2019, Persimmon Homes was suspended from the UK Government's Prompt Payment Code for failing to pay suppliers on time. It was reinstated around 10 months later.

=== Competition ===
In February 2024, Persimmon was among eight UK housebuilders targeted by the Competition and Markets Authority in an investigation into suspected breaches of competition law. The CMA said it had evidence that firms shared commercially sensitive information with competitors, influencing the build-out of sites and the prices of new homes. In January 2025, the CMA said it was conducting further investigations into the suspected anti-competitive conduct. In June 2025, the CMA investigation was extended to August 2025. In July 2025, the housebuilders offered to pay £100 million towards affordable housing programme as part of an agreement to reform practices on information sharing and to end the investigation without admitting any liability or wrongdoing. On 30 October 2025, the CMA confirmed its investigation had been dropped in return for a £100 million payment towards affordable homes and other measures including the development of industry-wide guidance on information sharing and agreements not to share certain types of information with other housebuilders.
