= Charles Church Developments =

British housebuilding company

Charles Church Developments Limited
- Formerly: Ritzvale Limited (1974–1981); Charles Church Southern Limited (1981–1995)
- Company type: Private limited company
- Industry: Housebuilding
- Founded: 1965; 61 years ago
- Founders: Charles and Susanna Church
- Headquarters: York, England, UK
- Parent: Persimmon plc
- Website: charleschurch.com

Charles Church Developments Limited, trading as Charles Church, is a British upmarket housebuilding company which is headquartered in York, England. The company is named after its co-founder Charles JG Church who established the business in 1965. After a series of complex restructurings and takeovers, the company has been a subsidiary of Persimmon plc since 2001.

== History ==
=== Foundation ===
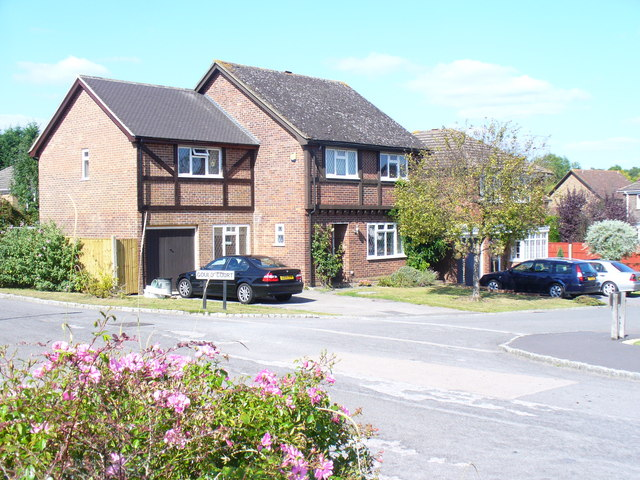
A Burke and Church / Charles Church house on the Merrow Park estate in Guildford

Church, a civil engineering graduate, started his own commercial contracting company in 1965 called Burke and Church. It was set up as a luxurious residential developer in south-east England. It built one house in Camberley, Surrey in 1967 and then used the proceeds to build four more houses before expanding further.

Church then started a joint venture with Martin Grant, a carpenter, to enable the financing of 125 plots in Lightwater in Surrey. It then purchased 1,000 plots at Merrow Park in Guildford in Surrey. This enabled Burke and Church to have a yearly volume of 400 homes a year. The joint venture between Church and Grant was phased out in 1972, with Church setting up Charles Church Developments with his wife, Susanna Church and Grant setting up Martin Grant Homes.

Charles Church built its reputation on building top quality new homes to the highest standards, successfully growing during the 1970s.

=== Expansion ===
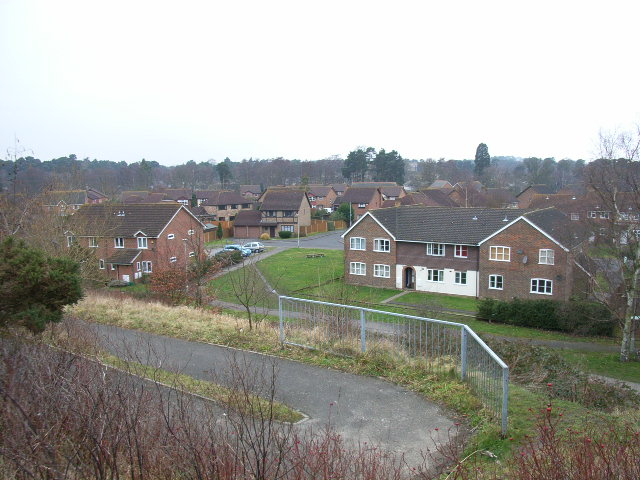
A 1980s Charles Church housing estate at Martins Heron in Bracknell

The company's rate of expansion grew during the 1980s. It had operations in residential developments, general construction, commercial properties as well as having operations in America. By 1985, the housebuilding arm consisted of three divisions, South East, Southern and Chiltern. It built on sites ranging from just one plot to up to 400 plots. It expanded into the London market in January 1987.

In April 1987 the company was floated on the London Stock Exchange, as Charles Church Developments plc, to further its expansion. At the time, the Church family retained over 80% of the firm's shares.

The company acquired County Homes in August 1987 to expand into Essex. It started building retirement homes in 1988. In 1988, the group sold 575 houses at around £500,000 each generating profits of £18 million.

On 25 May 1989, just over two years after the company's public floatation, Charles Church Developments plc was taken private and de-listed from the London Stock Exchange by Charles Church Holdings plc, a company controlled by the Church family.

On 1 July 1989, the company's co-founder and Chairman was killed in a plane crash at the age of 44. The Supermarine Spitfire aircraft which he was flying crashed on trying to land at Blackbushe Airport. He was one of the 200 richest people in the United Kingdom with a fortune of £140 million. He was survived by his wife, two daughters and one son.

=== Restructurings ===
Following the death of Church his wife assumed the role of chairman. In the subsequent recession, the company suffered under the debts taken on when it was taken private by the Church family.

The debts were restructured on 30 August 1991 and the company came under the control of its creditors, whereby if Charles Church met certain financial targets, control would pass back to the company's directors, i.e. the Chairman and her family. However, the company went through another financial restructuring during 1994, with the holding company becoming The Charles Church Group Limited. Susannah Church retired from the company on 29 June 1994 as a result of this reorganisation. At this point, a competitor, Fairclough Homes, offered to acquire the company. However, Charles Church's lead creditor, Royal Bank of Scotland, bought out the other syndicate of banks for £22.6 million and became the sole owner of the company on 14 March 1996.

=== Subsequent takeovers ===
On 13 May 1996 Beazer Group plc, then the UK's third largest housebuilder, paid £35.7 million for Charles Church, including £3 million goodwill for the "Charles Church" brand name. The previous year, Charles Church sold 193 units at around £180,000 each generating profits of £4.1 million before interest charges of around £3 million. Under Beazer's ownership, Charles Church grew from being a regional housebuilder in the south east of England to a nationwide residential developer throughout the United Kingdom.

In 2001 Beazer was taken over by Persimmon plc who retained the £37 million "Charles Church" brand name for its most upmarket homes.

== Operations ==
=== Product range ===
The company currently operates throughout the United Kingdom. It builds a full range of homes from one bedroom apartments to six bedroom detached houses.

== Notable developments ==
Between 1999 and 2000, Charles Church built a very luxurious housing estate called Ledborough Gate, in Beaconsfield, Buckinghamshire. The development, on a former school playing field which cost Charles Church £14.5 million to acquire, comprised 31 large five, six and seven bedroom detached family houses, some with triple garages and more than 4,000 sq ft of accommodation and each costing more than £1 million to buy at the time. The homes were designed in the English country house style, with arts and crafts, rural and Georgian facades and they had double-glazed sash windows. Inside, there was underfloor heating throughout the ground and first floors, stone or marble-style fireplaces with surround and hearth or inglenook fireplaces and the kitchens had granite worktops and De Dietrich appliances. The development also had its own 24-hour concierge operating from a lodge and each home had a video entry phone and intercom connection to the lodge. Charles Church even offered buyers a year's worth of support from a company that offered personal assistant-type services. Once a week, it ran errands to and from London for residents, and they even found someone to do their residents' ironing, washing or gardening for them.

== Criticism ==
Buyers have complained about the quality of their Charles Church homes. In 2014, a blog post claiming to be from Church's son, Charles N Church, criticised Persimmon for lowering the quality of Charles Church branded homes, saying that his father would be very upset by the homes built under his name today.

== In popular culture ==
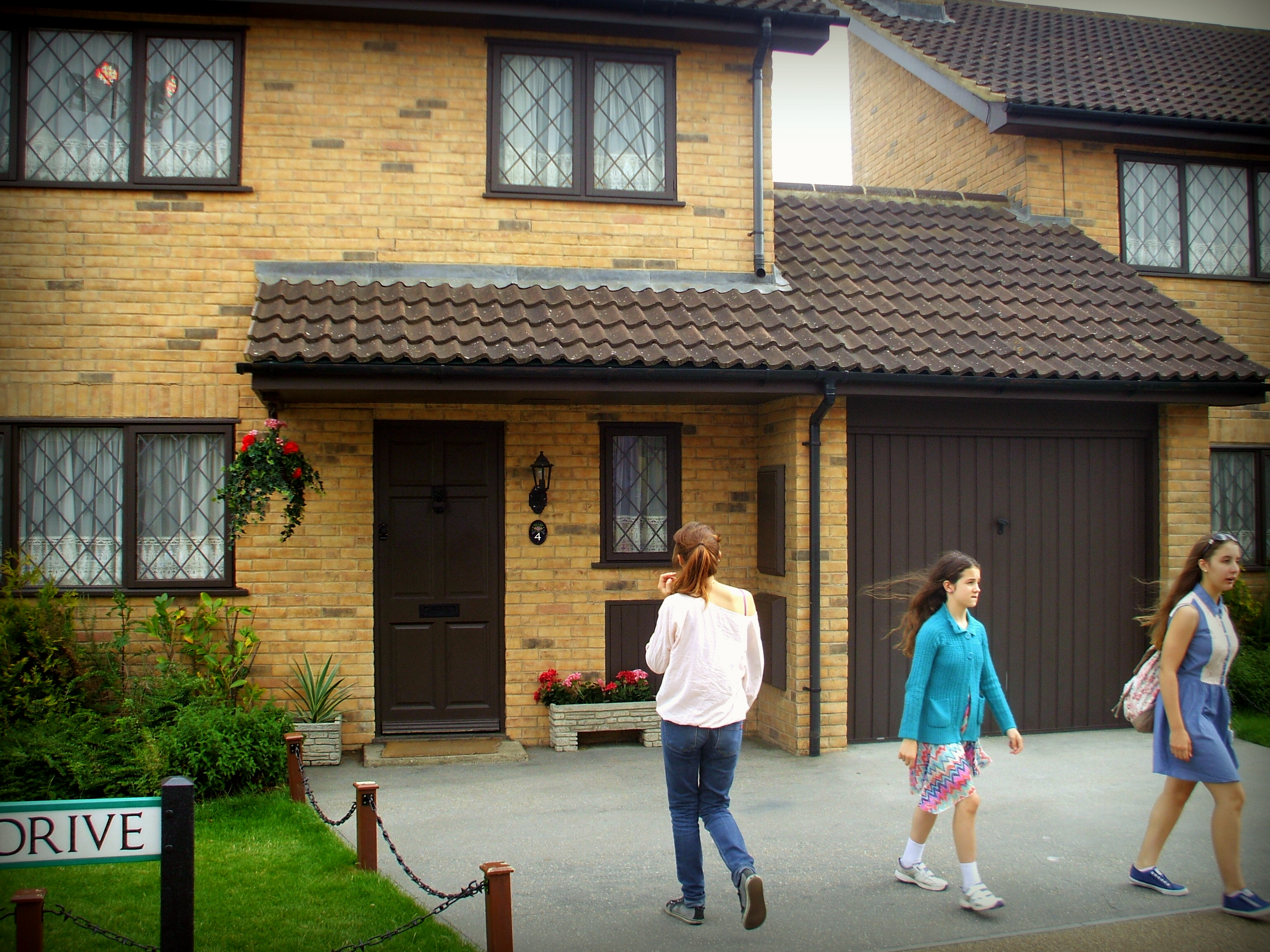
A reconstruction of a Charles Church house for the Harry Potter film series

One of the most well known Charles Church housing estates is located in Martins Heron in Bracknell, Berkshire. It is the location of Harry Potter's uncle and aunt's house. The filmed version of the first of JK Rowling's stories, Harry Potter and the Philosopher's Stone was filmed partly on location. The external scenes with the actor Daniel Radcliffe playing Harry Potter at his house were shot on location at a house in Picket Post Close, Martins Heron. However, according to the documentary Creating the World of Harry Potter, logistics made this location impractical as a long-term filming location, so a portion of the street was recreated on the backlot of Leavesden Film Studios.
