= William Leech =

William Leech may refer to:

- Billy Leech (William Leech, 1875–1934), English footballer
- William John Leech (1881–1968), Irish painter
- William Leech plc, a Tyneside housebuilder
