= Lady Rachel Pepys =

British aristocrat

Lady Rachel Pepys DCVO
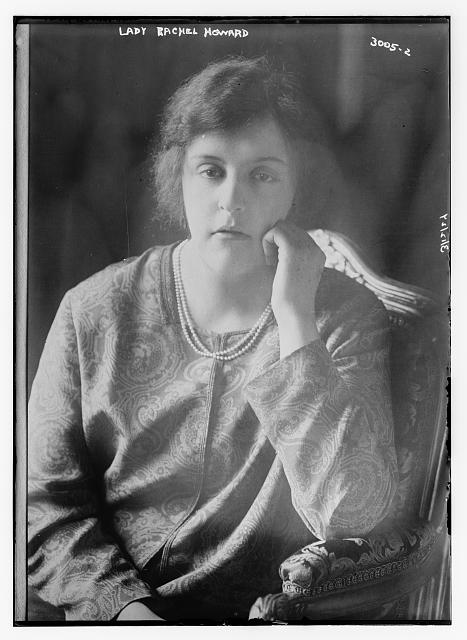
- Born: Lady Mary Rachel Fitzalan-Howard; 27 June 1905; St James's, Westminster
- Died: 17 August 1992 (aged 87); Burgess Hill, West Sussex
- Spouse(s): Colin Keppel Davidson (m. 1939; died 1943) Anthony Pepys (m. 1961; died 1967)
- Children: Duncan Davidson; Harriet Mary Sefi
- Parent(s): Henry Fitzalan-Howard, 15th Duke of Norfolk; Gwendolen Constable-Maxwell, 12th Lady Herries of Terregles

Lady Mary Rachel Pepys, DCVO (née Fitzalan-Howard; 27 June 1905 – 17 August 1992) was an English courtier from the Howard family. She was lady-in-waiting to Princess Marina, Duchess of Kent, from 1943 to 1968.

== Early life ==
Lady Rachel was born at Norfolk House, St James's Square, the eldest child of Henry Fitzalan-Howard, 15th Duke of Norfolk (1847–1917), and his second wife, Gwendolen Constable-Maxwell, who was a peeress in her own right as 12th Lady Herries of Terregles.

== Marriage and issue ==
On 31 July 1939, Lady Rachel married Lieutenant Colonel Colin Keppel Davidson CIE OBE, son of Colonel Leslie Davidson and Lady Theodora Keppel, daughter of William Keppel, 7th Earl of Albemarle. They had two children:

- Duncan Henry Davidson (29 March 1941 - 19 October 2025), Page of Honour to Queen Elizabeth II 1955–57; founder of Persimmon plc.
- Harriet Mary Davidson (b. 1942), who married Michael Sefi, the current Keeper of the Royal Philatelic Collection.

Her husband was killed in action in Tunisia in 1943 during the Second World War.

On 9 November 1961, she married Brigadier Anthony Hilton Pepys, a descendent of diarist Samuel Pepys. He died just six years later.

== Later life ==
Lady Rachel retired from the Duchess of Kent's household in 1962. She later lived at Highfield House, Crossbush Lane, Arundel. She served as governor of St Philip's Catholic Primary School in Arundel.

She died in 1992, aged 87 at St George's Retreat, a nursing home run by Augustinian sisters near Burgess Hill, West Sussex. Her funeral was held at Arundel Cathedral and attended by two of the Duchess's children, Princess Alexandra and Prince Michael of Kent.
