= Bracknell (disambiguation) =

Bracknell is a town in the Bracknell Forest borough of the English county of Berkshire.

Bracknell may also refer to:

- Bracknell, Tasmania, Australia
- Bracknell (UK Parliament constituency), a county constituency represented in the House of Commons of the Parliament of the United Kingdom
- Bracknell railway station, a railway station serving the town of Bracknell in Berkshire, England
- Lady Bracknell, a fictional character in the play The Importance of Being Earnest
- Leah Bracknell (1964–2019), English character actress
