= Broseley Estates Limited =

British property development company

- Type: Privately Owned now dormant
- Industry: Private housebuilding
- Founded: 1953 by Daniel Horrocks
- Fate: Sold to Trafalgar House in 1987 and integrated into Ideal Homes
- Headquarters: Leigh, Lancashire, England, UK
- Key people: Daniel Horrocks, Chairman
- Products: 1,2,3,4,5 & 6 Bedroom Homes
- Revenue: £130 million (1983)
- Number of employees: circa 1000 - Facebook page for former employees to join
- Parent: Guardian Royal Exchange Assurance Sold to Trafalgar House 1987

Broseley Estates Limited, also referred to as Broseley Homes, was a housebuilder based in Leigh, Lancashire which operated from the 1950s until the 1980s.

== History ==
Broseley's roots trace back to the 1950s when Daniel Horrocks began his career as an estate agent; he formed a partnership with Alf Smith (of Culcheth) Ltd and two others, and started building small developments of houses and refurbishing commercial properties in the south Lancashire area. In 1960 the various development companies were merged into the Broseley Investment Company, with Royal Exchange holding 26%. In 1961 Metropolitan Railway Surplus Lands also acquired a 20% holding; after further changes in shareholdings, Guardian Royal Exchange (as it had then become) finally achieved majority control in 1970.

During the 1960s Broseley expanded in the north-west and then, through the acquisition of Frederick Powell & Sons Limited, in the south west. By the end of the decade it was building up to 1500 houses a year. The expansion continued in the 1970s with new regions in Scotland, the north east and the south east. By the early 1980s, Broseley's output was around 4500 houses a year, making it the fourth largest housebuilder in the country.

In 1986 and 1987, Horrocks suffered a series of heart attacks. After 25 years, Guardian Royal Exchange decided that, without Horrocks, it did not wish to continue running a housebuilding company. GRE retained the commercial property business but sold Broseley Estates to Trafalgar House in December 1986 for £71 million, where it was integrated into Trafalgar House's Ideal Homes. Brian Bennett, Broseley's longest serving employee (then regional director for Lancashire), moved to Ideal Homes as Land Director.

== Developments ==
Perhaps Broseley's most famous development was the housing used in Channel 4's Brookside television series from November 1982.

Broseley developed one of the largest UK housing estates at Croxteth Country Park in West Derby, Liverpool, constructing around 1000 new homes in a 7-year period, this was the largest private development in Europe at the time. It was also one of the first developers in Milton Keynes (where it sponsored a brass band, known then as Broseley Brass).

Several LDDC housing developments in the derelict Port of London were built in the early 1980s by the company, the first sites were: Birch Trees in Cypress, Beckton and Nelson Reach off Redriff Road in Surrey Quays. Other developments included Spirit Quay in Wapping, Greenland Quay and Tower Bridge Wharf.

== Divisions ==
Broseley Estates' main Head Office was based on Lord Street Leigh. It took the full block with boundaries on Lord Street, Bold Street, Vernon Street and Bond Street Leigh Lancashire. The building still stands today. In 1986 the company had regional offices at: Leigh, Airdrie in Scotland, Thornaby-on-Tees and Wakefield in Yorkshire, Liverpool, Nottingham, Luton, Bracknell, Stratford in London and Exeter. The Clubhouse stood on Holden Road, Leigh, next to the Broseley Football Club pitch.

Some Broseley houses and developments built in the 1980s

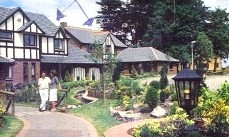

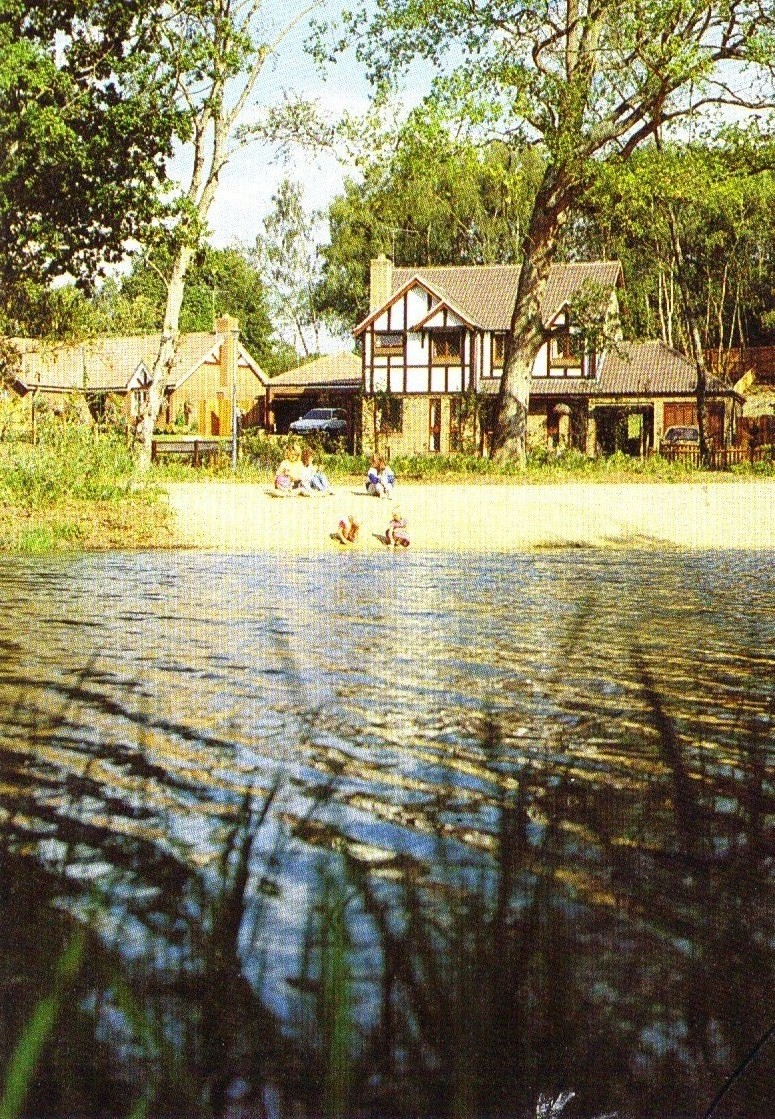

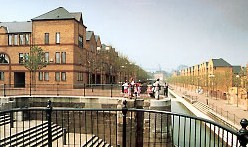
