= Perrys Motor Sales =

British auto dealer

- Company type: Private
- Industry: Car Sales
- Founded: 1908; 118 years ago
- Headquarters: Northampton, United Kingdom
- Products: Vehicles
- Website: www.perrys.co.uk

Perrys Motor Sales is a franchised automobile dealer in the United Kingdom, with its head office in Northampton, United Kingdom.

== History ==
The business was established by Harold Perry, in 1908, selling motor accessories. Harold Perry formerly worked for the United Kingdom distributor for Ford. Harold Perry was appointed dealer for Ford, for the City of London, in 1912. In 1911, Harold's brother, Sir Percival Perry, had persuaded Henry Ford to launch the Ford Motor Company in the United Kingdom.

Percival later became chairman of Ford's company, in the United Kingdom. In 1922, Sir Percival Perry helped André Citroën, to establish commercial and manufacturing subsidiaries, for the early Citroën automobile business in the United Kingdom. Perrys continued to acquire dealerships, until the outbreak of World War II, in 1939. As part of the war effort, sections of its dealership, in North London, were converted.

These were to meat distribution centre and workshops, for overhauling military vehicles, and making wings for gliders. By the 1980s, Perrys were acquiring non Ford dealerships, firstly Vauxhall, then Rover, Jaguar and Land Rover dealerships were brought into the company. The 1990s saw a further programme of dealership acquisitions, including Peugeot, Toyota, Renault, Iveco, Nissan and Lexus.

Darren Ardron was appointed managing director in 2015

== Management buyout ==
In March 2001, Perrys Group Plc sold its Motor Division to the Management Team, setting the stage for Perrys Motor Sales rapid recent expansion. The group now employs 1,400 people, across forty locations, with an annual turnover of £400 million. The firm also has its own training centre in Burnley Vauxhall’s and Kia Lancashire.

== Motability partner ==
Motability is an independent not for profit organisation, which started in 1978, to give disabled people access to cars in the United Kingdom. Perrys is the “Premier Partner” of Motability, and was the first recipient of the Motability Award for Best Dealer Group. Perrys dealerships have a Motability advisor on staff to help with vehicle adaptation and Motability financing.

== Sponsorships ==
Perrys Motor Sales supports dealerships local efforts:

- Dover Athletic F.C.
- Milton Keynes Brass
- Barnsley Football Club
- Rotherham United F.C.
