= Brambletye School =

Coordinates: 51°6′34.96″N 0°1′3.65″E

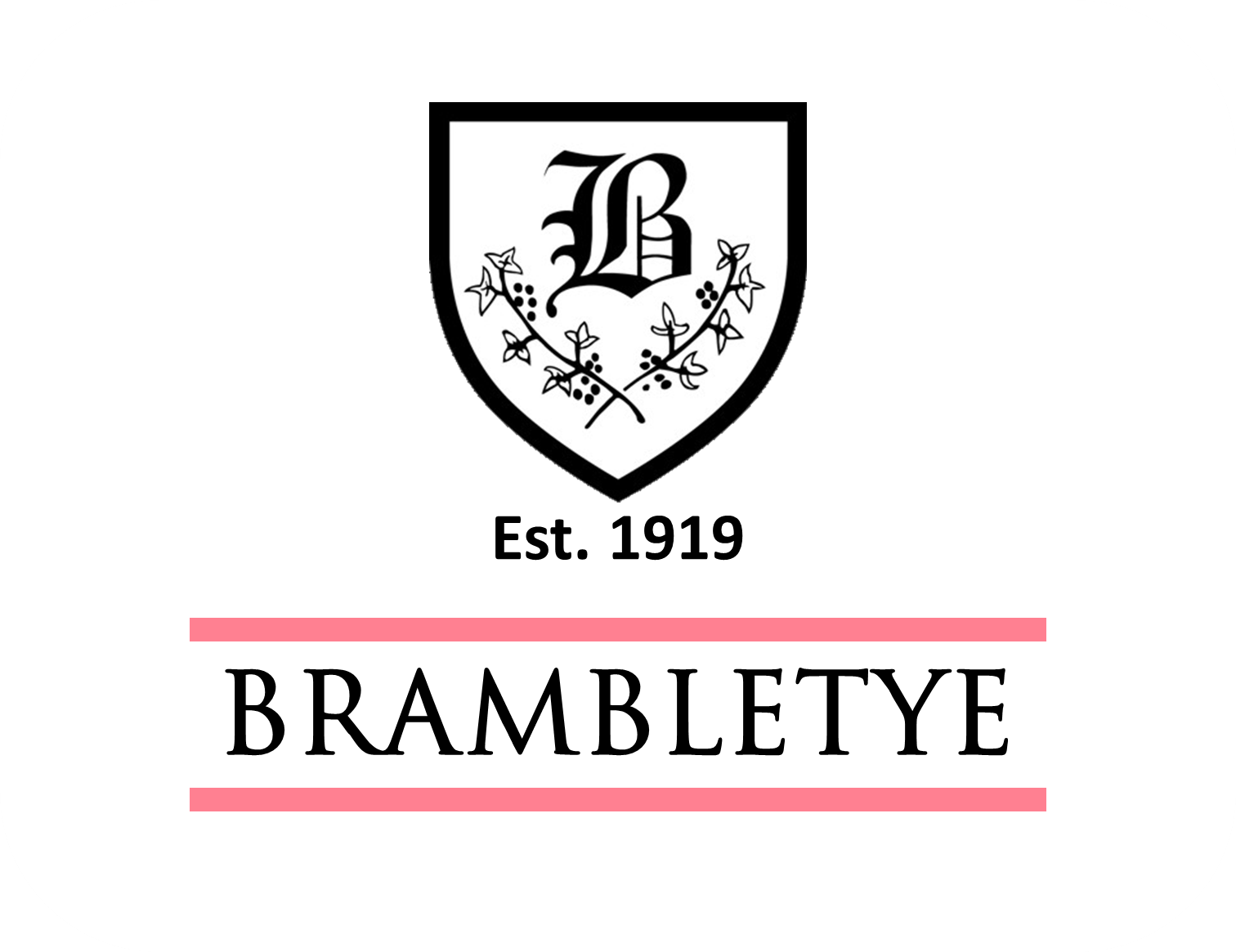
- East Grinstead, West Sussex, RH19 3PD; England

Information
- Type: Preparatory day and boarding
- Religious affiliation: Church of England
- Established: 1919
- Department for Education URN: 126150 Tables
- Headmaster: Will Brooks
- Gender: Coeducational
- Age: 2 to 13
- Enrolment: c290
- Houses: Nelson, Wellington, Drake, Malborough
- Colours: Pink, black and grey
- Former pupils: Old Brambletyeans
- Website: http://www.brambletye.co.uk/

The coat of arms of the school

Brambletye School is a coeducational day and boarding preparatory school in East Grinstead, West Sussex. It was founded as a small boys' boarding school in Kent between the world wars. The school moved to West Sussex and has since become coeducational.

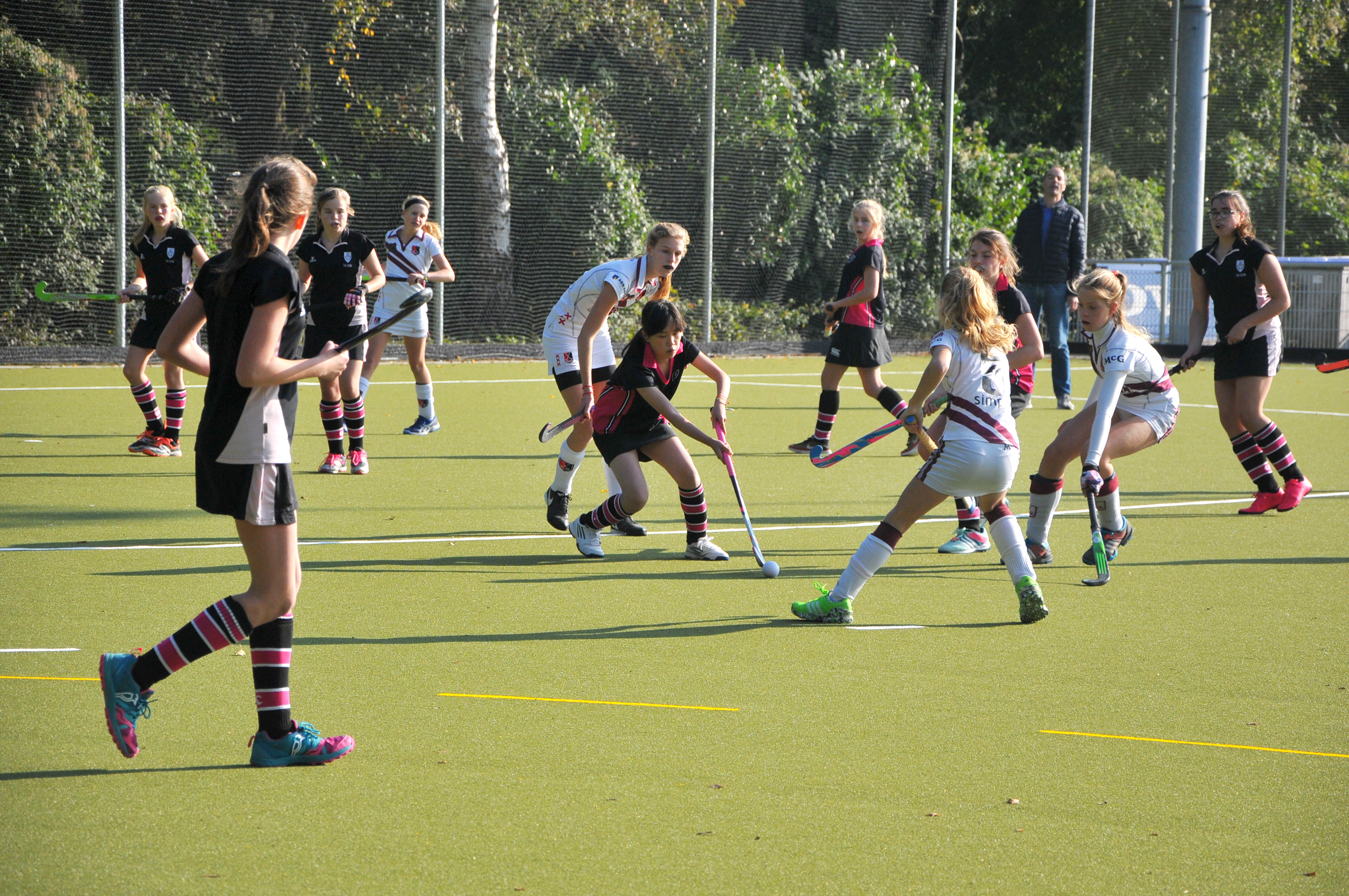
Brambletye vs Amstersdam (AH & BC) on tour, 2016

== History ==
Brambletye was founded at Sidcup Place, Kent in 1919. It moved to its present location in the Sussex countryside on the southern outskirts of East Grinstead in 1933. The main school building, which is in its own wooded estate of 140 acres, overlooks the Ashdown Forest and Weir Wood Reservoir. Brambletye was built in 1896 by Donald Larnach, former director of the Bank of New South Wales, as his country retreat. The school became a charitable trust in 1969 with a board of governors. In September 1986, the first girl was admitted and the school is now completely coeducational.

Recent building developments have included a seven-classroom block, a purpose-built arts centre including a 270-seat theatre, a sports hall, a pre-prep building and the redevelopment of the science laboratories. The Blencowe Centre won the Downland Prize for Architecture, Education, (joint winner) in 2010.

The Brambletye School Trust, a registered charity, created legal precedent in the UK with a value-added tax ruling.

In 2018, former teacher Jeremy Malim was convicted of sexual offences committed against pupils of the school between 1977 and 1999.

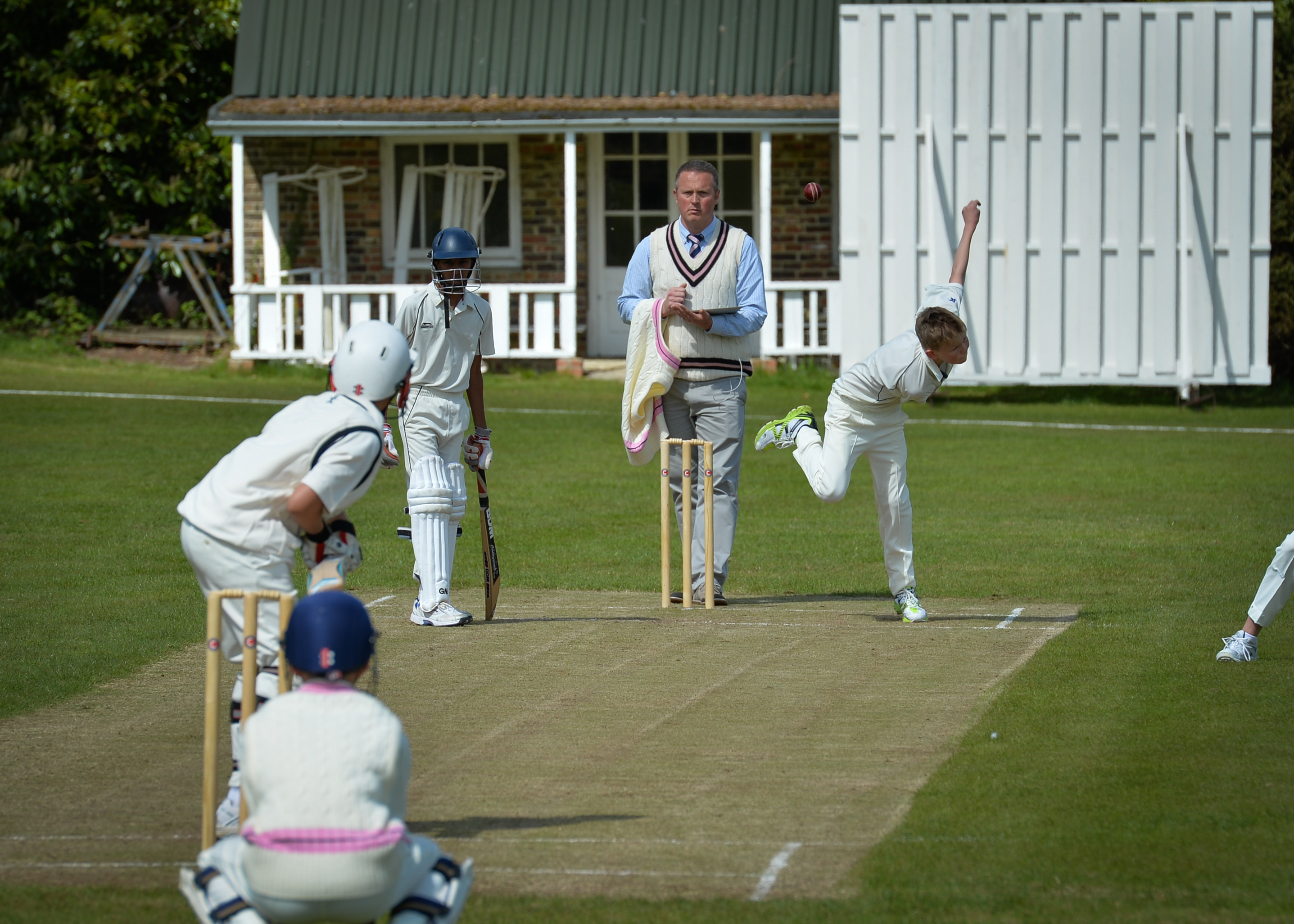
1st Team Cricket on the Top Field

== Notable alumni ==
- Nigel Broackes, founder of Trafalgar House
- Benedict Cumberbatch, actor
- Jeremy Moore, commander of the British land forces during the Falklands War in 1982.
- Nigel Morritt Wace, a leading authority on the plant life of the four Tristan da Cunha Islands
- Sir Christopher Nugee, British Court of Appeal Judge
- Lt General Richard Nugee, Climate Change Lead for the Ministry of Defence

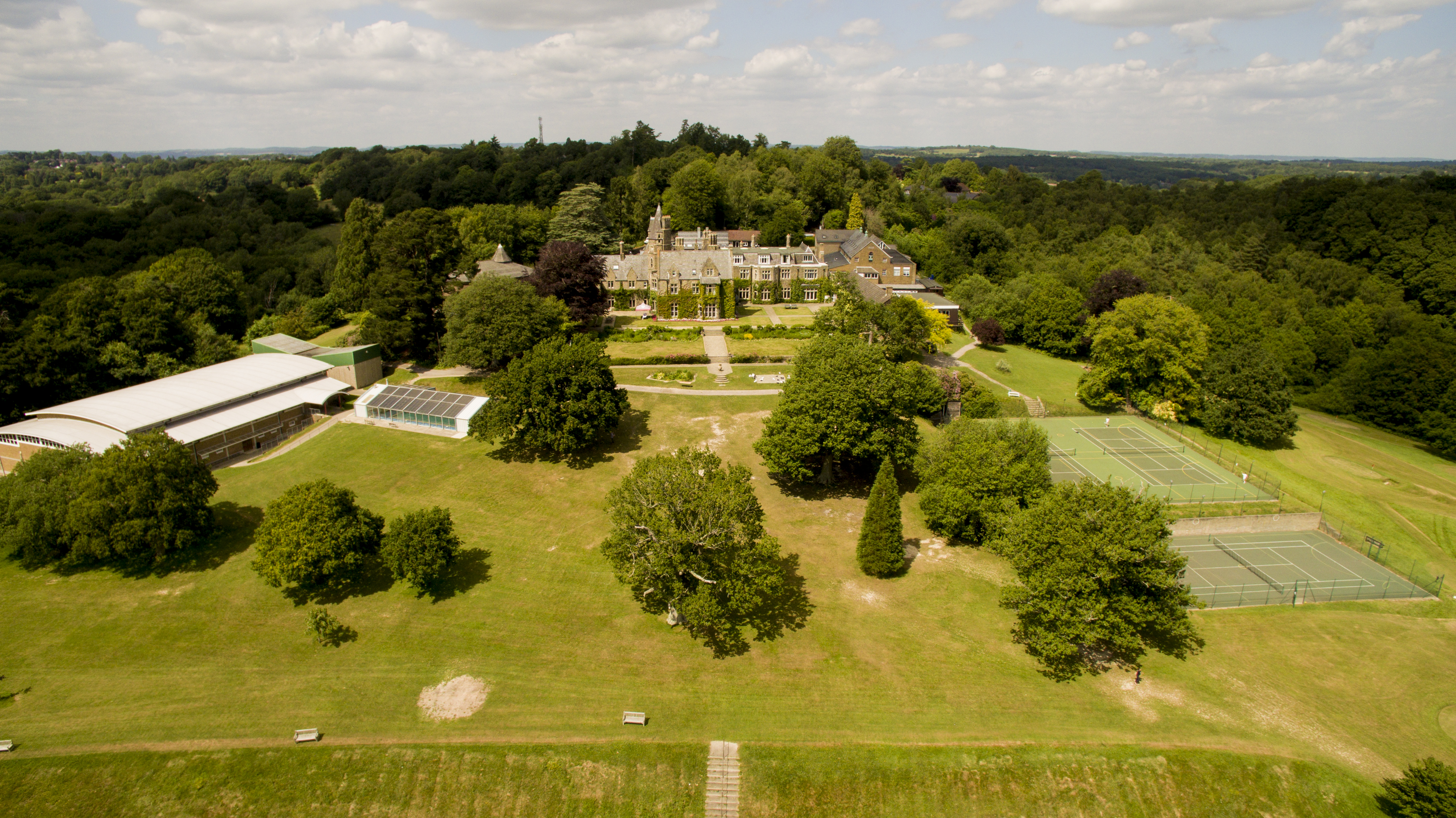
The School sits in site of 140 acres of Sussex countryside overlooking the Ashdown Forest
