= The Warren, Bracknell Forest =

Suburb of Bracknell, Berkshire, England

Coordinates: 51.405168°N 0.722480°W

The Warren
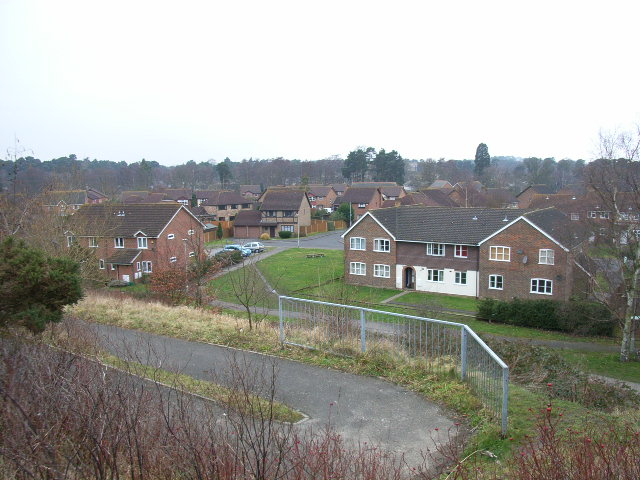
- Looking west from the railway bridge

- Location within Berkshire
- OS grid reference: SU889680
- Unitary authority: Bracknell Forest
- Shire county: Berkshire
- Region: South East
- Country: England
- Sovereign state: United Kingdom
- Post town: BRACKNELL
- Postcode district: RG12
- Dialling code: 01344
- Police: Thames Valley
- Fire: Royal Berkshire
- Ambulance: South Central
- UK Parliament: Bracknell

The Warren is a suburban area in Berkshire, England, and a conurbation of Bracknell, adjacent to the large expanses of Swinley Forest, part of the Crown Estate. The Warren and the neighbouring suburb Martins Heron are after a Parliamentary Boundary review in the Bracknell constituency - until 2010 they were in the Windsor Constituency. It is in Swinley Forest ward.

== Location ==
The settlement lies near to the Waterloo to Reading Line, and is served by Martins Heron railway station. The village is approximately 1.5 miles (2.4 km) south-east of Bracknell town centre.
