= Ideal Homes (US housebuilder) =

Home builder based in Oklahoma, U.S.

- Type: Private
- Industry: Home Construction
- Founded: 1990
- Founder: Vernon McKown, Gene McKown, and Todd Booze
- Headquarters: Norman, Oklahoma
- Area served: Oklahoma City
- Key people: Gene McKown

Ideal Homes is a home builder based in the greater Oklahoma City metropolitan area. The company builds new homes in Edmond, Norman, Piedmont, Choctaw, Midwest City, Mustang, Moore, and Stillwater, Oklahoma. As recently as 2015, Ideal Homes is a popular homebuilder for millennial homebuyers, as they offer affordable new homes suitable for the first-time homebuyer.

== History ==
Founded in 1990 by Gene McKown They became a BBB Accredited Business On March 21, 1997.

== Awards and recognition ==
Ideal Homes has won many prestigious industry awards over the years, including the 2014 Avid Gold Award for the South Central region of the United States in recognition of its ranking in the “New Home Move-In Experience”TM. They received the Avid Benchmark Award in 2012 and 2013. Other awards include 2007 America's Best Builder Award, 2006 Energy Star for Homes Outstanding Achievement Award, and 2006 Gold National Housing Quality Award.
