= Nigel Broackes =

English businessman; founder of Trafalgar House

Sir Nigel Broackes
- Born: Nigel Broackes; 21 July 1934; Wakefield, Yorkshire, England
- Died: 29 September 1999 (aged 65); Chelsea, London, England
- Education: Brambletye School; Stowe School
- Occupation: Businessman
- Known for: Founder of Trafalgar House
- Spouse: Joyce Edith Horne (née Skidmore)
- Children: 3
- Relatives: Grace Beverley (granddaughter)

Sir Nigel Broackes (21 July 1934 – 29 September 1999) was an English businessman and the founder of Trafalgar House, one of the United Kingdom's largest contracting businesses.

== Career ==
Born in Wakefield, Broackes was the son of solicitor Donald Broackes and artist Nancy Rowland (née Tansley) Broackes. His father died in 1943 whilst serving in the Army, leaving only a small estate. With his mother denied a war pension as her husband had died of natural causes, Broackes was raised in straitened circumstances. His paternal grandfather, despite having been on bad terms with his son, left money for his grandson's education. Broackes was educated at Brambletye School in Sussex and Stowe School, and joined Stewart & Hughman, a firm of Lloyd's underwriters, on leaving school. He then did national service from 1951 to 1953 with the 3rd Hussars, and was commissioned as a second lieutenant in the Royal Armoured Corps in 1953, leaving in 1954

After completing his national service, Broackes returned to Stewart & Hughman for a short time before deciding to go into business himself; three "unsuccessful and diverse ventures" in house conversion, hire purchase, and tool-making used up most of the inheritance he received from his grandfather, but he came to realize the development potential of London bomb-sites. He worked for a West End estate agent for a short time to learn the property business, and a stockbroker friend of his mother helped him come into contact with potential financial backers. Using his last remaining asset, a small apartment block, and with the support of Eastern International, a small finance house, he started buying up bomb sites in London. Eastern International became Trafalgar House and Broackes took a 21% stake in the business when it was first listed on the London Stock Exchange in 1963. In 1964 the Company took a 49% stake in Bridge Walker, a construction company owned by Victor Matthews. After that Broackes and Matthews worked together to build Trafalgar House into one of the United Kingdom's largest contracting businesses. Trafalgar House owned the Cunard Line from 1971 to 1998. Broackes resigned in 1992 following heavy losses associated with a diversification into offshore activities.

In 1979 Broackes became chairman of the London Docklands Development Corporation, from which post he resigned in 1984. He was knighted for his role at that organisation in 1984.

He died in 1999 in Chelsea. His estate was valued at over £16 million; his wife, who died in 1993, left an estate of over £5 million.

== Family ==
He was married (as her second husband) to Joyce Edith Horne, née Skidmore; they had two sons Justin and Simon, and a daughter Victoria who is the mother of Grace Beverley.

== Arms ==
Coat of arms of Nigel Broackes

Crest
A demi-dragon rampant wings elevated Gules armed and langued Azure holding in the dexter claw a goblet Or.
Escutcheon
Vair three castles triple-towered in pale Gules.
Motto
Ausculta Discesque
