= Nigel Morritt Wace =

British Royal Marine, botanist and subantarctic guide

- Born: 10 January 1929; India
- Died: 4 February 2005 (aged 76); Canberra, Australia
- Education: Brasenose College, Oxford, Queen's University, Belfast
- Known for: Authority on the plant life of the four Tristan da Cunha Islands; knowledge of the Australian flora; guide and lecturer in cruise ships to the Antarctic
- Scientific career
- Thesis: Gough Island's vegetation

Nigel Morritt Wace (10 January 1929 – 4 February 2005) was an authority on the plant life of the four Tristan da Cunha Islands, islands he first visited in 1955 when he visited Gough Island. He was educated at Brambletye School, then Sheikh Bagh Preparatory School in Kashmir, then school in Cheltenham, followed by a period as a commissioned officer in the Royal Marines from where he was invalided out in 1947, progressing to Brasenose College, Oxford.

At Brasenose Wace read Agricultural Economics, switching to Botany. His later work on Tristan da Cunha led to his PhD thesis on the vegetation of Gough Island, received from Queen's University, Belfast.

Wace's periods in Tristan da Cunha started with his membership as botanist of the Gough Island Scientific Survey from 1955–56.

In Australia Wace made a substantial contribution to knowledge of the Australian flora, both in settled parts and in the outback.

Wace married Margaret White with whom he had a son and two daughters. Wace's family claims descent from Wace, the 12th-century Jerseyman and chronicler of the House of Normandy.

He was employed by the Geography department of the University of Adelaide, moving later to the Australian National University at Canberra where he was initially a lecturer subsequently head of the university's department of Biogeography and Geomorphology.

== Publications ==
- Wace, Nigel Morritt (1973). Yankee maritime activities and the early history of Australia (Research School of Pacific Studies. Aids to research series, no. A/2). Australian National University, Research School of Pacific Studies. ISBN 978-0708108215.
- Wace, Nigel Morritt. Man and nature in the Tristan de Cunha Islands (IUCN monograph). International Union for Conservation of Nature and Natural Resources. ASIN B0006EBPH2.
- Wace, Nigel Morritt (1965). Future of the Tristan da Cunha Islands (Nature). Fisher, Knight & Co. ASIN B0007KARTW.
