= Offcut =

An offcut or off-cut is material left over after a workpiece is cut or processed, such as in masonry, metalworking, woodworking, industrial or domestic food processing, and textile manufacturing. An offcut is waste material which can sometimes be reused, recycled, or sold as scrap. For material destroyed by the operation of a tool in such a process, see kerf loss.

It may also refer to:

- Offcutts, an Australian music group
- The Off Cut Festival, a British theatre festival

== See also ==
- Cutoff (disambiguation)
- Offal
- Swarf
