= Cutoff =

Cutoff or cut off or cut-off may refer to:

== Places ==
- Cut Off, Louisiana, a town in the US
- Cutoff, Georgia, an unincorporated community in the US

== Alternative routes (US:Westward Expansion Trails) ==
- Elliott Cutoff
- Hastings Cutoff
- Lander Cutoff
- Lassen Cutoff
- Meek Cutoff
- Salt Lake Cutoff
- Tucson Cutoff
- Woodbury Cutoff

== Clothing and fashion ==
- Cut-off or kutte, a usually sleeveless decorated jacket
- Crop top, or cutoff, a shirt that exposes the midriff
- Cut-off shorts, long pants that have been cut at the knee level (usually without a hem) to create shorts

== Science and technology ==
- Cut-off (electronics), a state of negligible conduction.
- Cutoff (metalworking), a piercing operation used to cut a workpiece from the stock.
- Cutoff (meteorology), a high- or low-pressure system stuck in place due to a lack of steering currents.
- Cutoff (physics), a threshold value for a quantity.
- Cutoff (reference value), a one-sided reference range in health-related fields.
- Cutoff (steam engine), the point in the piston stroke at which the inlet valve is closed.
- Cutoff frequency, in telecommunications and digital signal processing.
- Cutoff grade, in mining, the level of mineral in an ore below which it is not economically feasible to mine it.
- Cutoff voltage, the voltage at which a battery is considered fully discharged.
- Fuse (electrical) (or cutoff), a type of overcurrent protection device.
- Meander cutoff, a course change in a meandering river.
- Cutoff functions, a construction used to eliminate singularities of a given function.
- Thermal cutoff, an electrical safety device that interrupts electric current when heated to a specific temperature.

== Other uses ==
- Cut-off (poker), the seat to the right of the dealer or button, second best position
- Railroad cutoff, a new railroad line built to replace or supplement an existing route
- Cutoff Mountain, a summit in Montana
- Cut Off (2018 film), a German thriller film
- Cut Off, an unreleased American comedy film

== See also ==
- Cutting off, a hazardous driving technique
