= Martins Heron =

Area of Bracknell, Berkshire, England

Coordinates: 51.409152°N 0.722537°W

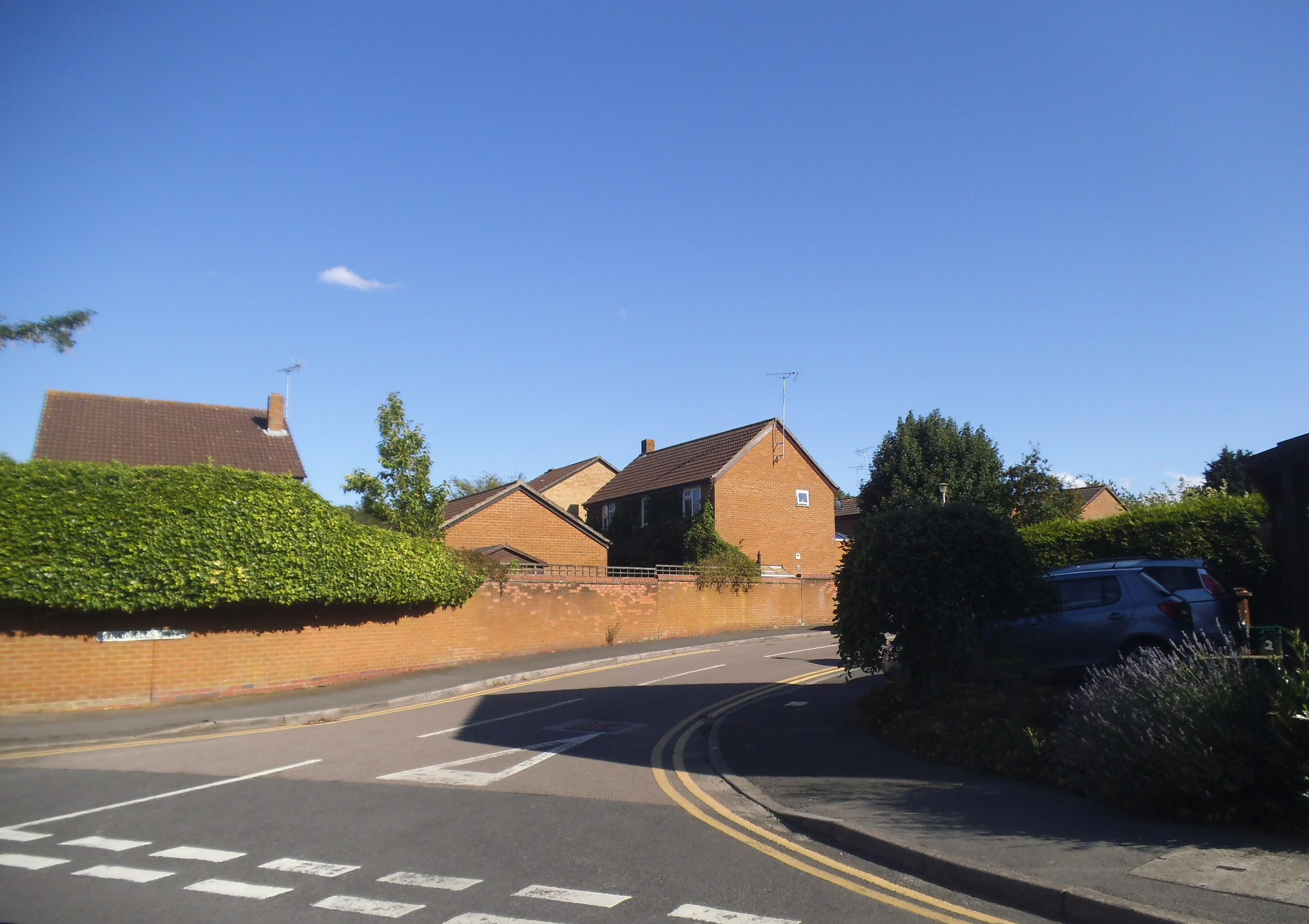
- Fordwells Drive

- Location within Berkshire
- OS grid reference: SU889685
- Civil parish: Winkfield
- Metropolitan borough: Bracknell Forest
- Metropolitan county: Berkshire
- Region: South East
- Country: England
- Sovereign state: United Kingdom
- Post town: BRACKNELL
- Postcode district: RG12
- Dialling code: 01344
- Police: Thames Valley
- Fire: Royal Berkshire
- Ambulance: South Central
- UK Parliament: Bracknell

Martins Heron is a suburb of Bracknell 25 miles (40 km) west of London in Berkshire, England. Martins Heron and the neighbouring suburb The Warren are, after a Parliamentary Boundary review, in the Bracknell constituency – until 2010 they were in the Windsor Constituency. It is in the Swinley Forest ward, which also includes Forest Park.

The name stems from the obsolete word hern, meaning nook or corner of land. The area is bordered by Bracknell to the west and large wooded areas, notably Swinley Woods on the east and Lily Hill Park to the north.

== History ==
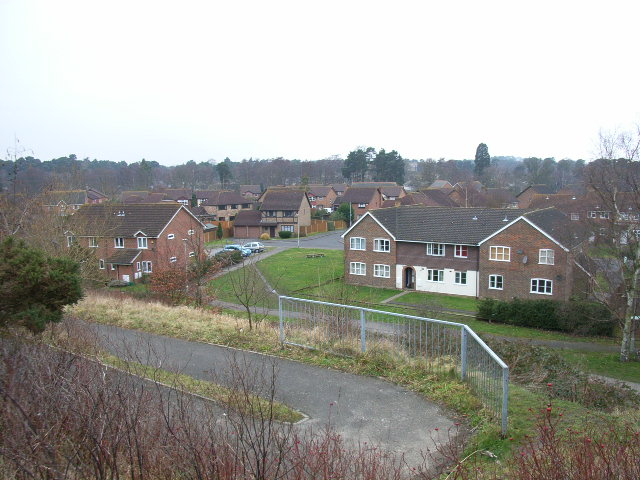
Charles Church housing estate at Martins Heron

The area lies within the former parkland and grounds of a mansion, Martins Herne (or Heron), built around 1750 but demolished in the early 1980s, which was associated with minor nobility for much of its life, including the 18th-century British general, William Gordon. The house made way for a small estate of mainly large detached houses built by Charles Church Developments.

== Amenities ==
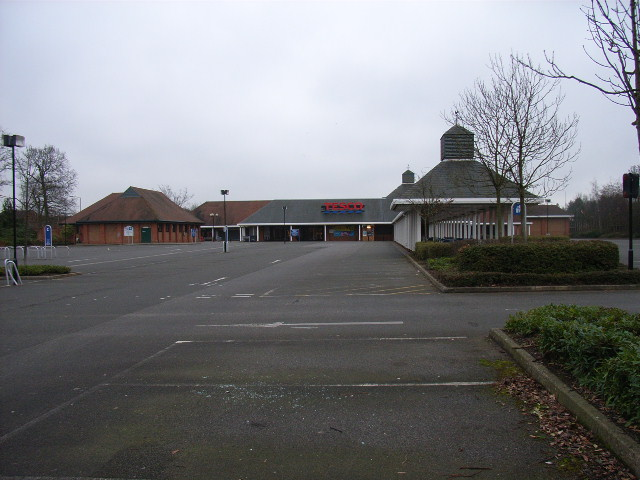
Tesco supermarket, Martins Heron, Bracknell in 2006

Tesco Martins Heron was opened in the 1980s and was extended in 2008, drastically increasing its size and drawing new customers to the area. However this had been an issue that had been addressed by the local residents many times, and it had taken years for Tesco to receive planning permission to go ahead with the build. The new store was finished in May 2008.

Next to Tesco, sits the Martins Heron and The Warren Community Hall. This is a small local hall, which has also been refurbished. It had an extension built at the start of the new millennium, and now contains the main hall, as well as the annexe hall, cloakrooms and a small waiting area. It is mostly used by the local nursery school, as well as the Martins Heron School of Dance, which holds classes most evenings during term time.

== Transport ==
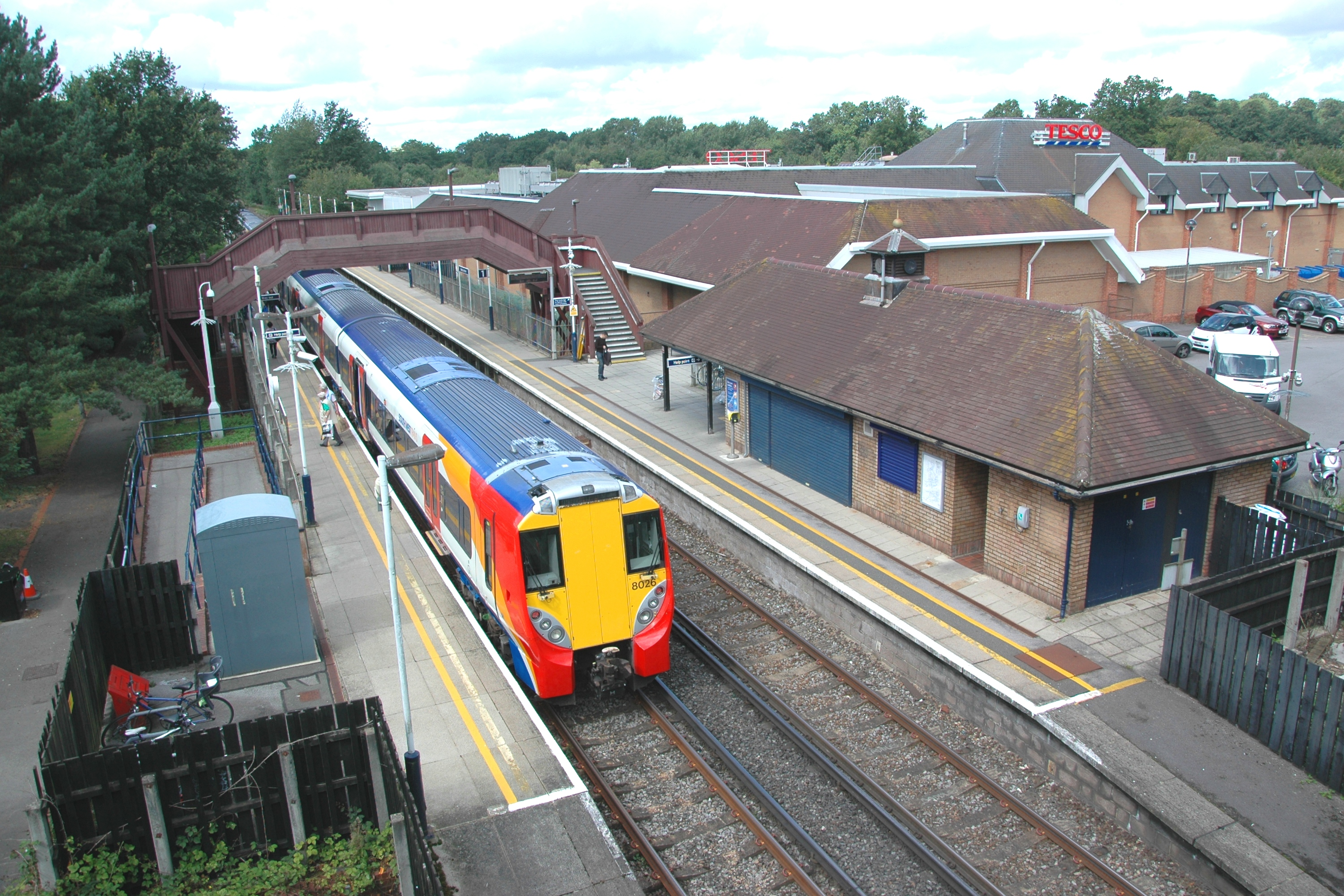
Martins Heron railway station

Martins Heron railway station serves commuters travelling to London Waterloo and Reading, Berkshire. The railway station is small but is staffed during the morning and is equipped with CCTV. The station is situated right next to the Tesco supermarket, and part of the building costs were contributed by the retailer as a precondition of the supermarket being built.

== In popular culture ==
Martins Heron is well known locally as being the site of Harry Potter's uncle and aunt's house. The filmed version of the first of JK Rowling's famous stories, Harry Potter and the Philosopher's Stone was filmed partly on location. The external scenes with the actor Daniel Radcliffe playing Harry Potter at his house were shot on location at a house in Picket Post Close, Martins Heron. However, according to the documentary Creating the World of Harry Potter, logistics made this location impractical as a long-term filming location, so a portion of the street was recreated on the backlot of Leavesden Film Studios.

Martins Heron Tesco was also used for filming. Until 2009 it was one of the very few Tesco supermarkets in the country that was not open on Sunday, owing to concerns from local residents. It also had restricted opening hours on weekdays. It has therefore been used as a filming location for many of the Tesco television adverts featuring Prunella Scales and Jane Horrocks among others.
