= Duncan Davidson (businessman) =

British businessman (1941–2025)

- Born: Duncan Henry Davidson; 29 March 1941
- Died: 19 October 2025 (aged 84)
- Spouse: Sarah Filmer-Wilson (m. 1965)
- Children: 4
- Parent(s): Lady Rachel Pepys; Colin Keppel Davidson
- Family: Fitzalan-Howard family

Duncan Henry Davidson (29 March 1941 – 19 October 2025) was a British businessman who was the founder of Persimmon plc, one of the United Kingdom's largest housebuilding businesses. In 2018, it was reported that his wealth had risen by £32 million and he was worth £175 million.

== Early life and education ==
Davidson's mother Rachel Fitzalan-Howard, a daughter of Henry Fitzalan-Howard, 15th Duke of Norfolk, married Brigadier Anthony Hilton Pepys in 1961. Lady Rachel was a lady-in-waiting to Princess Marina, Duchess of Kent from 1943 until 1968. Davidson was a great-grandson of William Keppel, 7th Earl of Albemarle through his paternal grandmother Lady Theodora Keppel. He was a second cousin once removed of Queen Camilla who is a great-great-granddaughter of the 7th Earl of Albermarle.

Davidson was educated at Ampleforth College. He was a pageboy at the Coronation of Elizabeth II and nine years later worked as a labourer on London's Blackwall Tunnel.

== Career ==
Davidson went into the British Army in 1959 and served in the Royal Scots Greys for four years. In 1963 he joined George Wimpey where he managed construction work in Iran.

In 1965, he founded Ryedale Homes which he sold seven years later to Comben Homes for £1 million. In 1972, he founded Persimmon plc and expanded it into one of the United Kingdom's largest housebuilding businesses. He retired as Executive Chairman in 2006 but remained Life President.

== Personal life ==
Davidson married Sarah Filmer-Wilson in 1965; the couple had four daughters.

He owned 20,000 acres (81 km^{2}) of land in Northumberland and lived at Lilburn Tower near Wooler.

== Death ==
Davidson died on 19 October 2025, at the age of 84.
