= Ideal Homes (UK housebuilder) =

British housebuilder

- Industry: Housebuilding
- Founded: 1929
- Defunct: 1996
- Fate: Acquired
- Successor: Persimmon

Ideal Homes was a British housebuilder.

New Ideal Homesteads was formed in 1929 and, under Leo Meyer, became the country's largest private housebuilder in the 1930s. It never achieved the same success after the War and in 1967 it was bought by Trafalgar House. Helped by the acquisition of Comben Homes and Broseley Estates it had become the fifth largest housebuilder by the late 1980s. However, Trafalgar's weakened financial position eventually led to the sale of Ideal Homes to Persimmon in 1996.

== History ==
Ideal Homes, as it was generally known, was incorporated in 1929 as New Ideal Homesteads. Its driving force for over thirty years was Leo Meyer, a one-time assistant surveyor for Erith Council. He started building at Bexleyheath in the 1920s as Blackwell & Meyer but his first attempts ended in failure. Starting again in 1929, Meyer formed a partnership with Philip Shephard, an inspector with the Royal Exchange. Ideal's expansion was rapid and in 1933 it sold over 4,000 houses in estates around London.

A public flotation was obtained in May 1934, the new holding company being named Ideal Building & Land Development. Housing volumes continued to expand and estates were now being built outside London, particularly in the midlands: Furnell put the figure at 5,500 in 1934 and in the mid-1930s sales were estimated at 5–7,000 a year, more than twice the size of its nearest competitors. Jackson regarded Ideal as “perhaps the most prolific of all the London developers of the thirties”.

In contrast to the physical growth in the business, profits fell sharply after the flotation and the dividend was cut two years in succession; the shares fell by almost 90 per cent from their offer price amidst suggestions by The Investors’ Review of substantial share sales by the directors. Philip Shephard resigned as joint managing director as did the chairman. Meyer had to use his own financial resources as bank guarantees.

With war approaching, Ideal turned its resources to construction for the nation's defences although, unlike other leading housebuilders, Ideal did not continue as a contractor when peace returned. Ideal had already been changing its emphasis towards the purchase and sale of tenanted properties and, with building controls severely restricting the opportunities for private housebuilding after the war, that continued to be Ideal's focus. In addition, Ideal's subsidiary Carlton Contractors built substantial numbers of houses for local authorities. Leo Meyer himself, dissatisfied with the Labour Government's approach to private enterprise, left the UK in 1948 for South Africa where he formed a local New Ideal Homesteads.

In 1953, Meyer returned to the UK just as building controls were finally dismantled and Ideal moved back into private estate development with considerable speed. By the start of the 1960s, Ideal was selling around 2–3,000 houses a year, second only to George Wimpey. However, after a long illness, Leo Meyer died in 1961 and Ideal failed to share in the growth of the private housing market; indeed an increase in interest rates in 1966 took sales down to little more than 1,100. In 1967 the weakened firm was bought by Trafalgar House.

Although there was some recovery after the Trafalgar House acquisition, growth was erratic and it was not until the early 1980s that sales regained the 2,000 a year level. Then came two major housebuilding acquisitions: Comben Homes in 1984 and Broseley Estates in 1986. In the following year, Ideal sold over 5,000 houses and was number five in the industry and in 1988 it contributed a record £78 million to Trafalgar's trading profits. However, apart from the direct problems of the 1990 recession, Ideal was severely affected by the parent company's financial straits. It was unable to buy replacement land when at its cheapest and by 1995 its sales were down to 2,600. Wanting to lessen its own financial commitments, Trafalgar put Ideal up for sale and in 1996 it was bought by Persimmon for £177 million.
