= Comben Homes =

British house builder

- Formerly: Comben & Wakeling
- Industry: Housebuilding
- Founded: 1907
- Founders: James White Comben and William Henry Wakeling
- Defunct: 1984
- Fate: Acquired
- Successor: Ideal Homes
- Headquarters: Wembley, London, United Kingdom
- Products: House building

Comben Homes was a large British house building company that operated from 1907 and was acquired in 1984 by Trafalgar House.

== History ==
The company was founded in 1907 by James White Comben and William Henry Wakeling as Comben & Wakeling and was incorporated as a private company in 1924.

In 1972 it bought Ryedale Homes from Duncan Davidson for £1m and changed its name to Comben Group and subsequently traded as Comben Homes.

In 1984, it was acquired by Trafalgar House and integrated in its Ideal Homes housebuilding business.
