= Milton Keynes Brass =

British Band

Milton Keynes Brass (or MK Brass for short) is a British-style community brass band based in Milton Keynes, UK. It was founded in 1984 and was known until 2007 as Broseley Brass. This former name derived from that of its original commercial sponsors Broseley estates limited who were house builders active during the early development of Milton Keynes.

MK Brass maintains a schedule of concert and contest engagements and has undertaken tours of France and Switzerland. It produced its first CD, "Broseley Bandstand", in 2004.

The band became London and Southern Counties 1st Section Champions in March 2007 and subsequently represented the region in the National Finals contest in Harrogate. MK Brass was promoted to the Championship Section for 2008. In its first appearance in the Area content in 2008 Milton Keynes Brass was placed 3rd, and later in 2008 won the South West of England Open Championship.

The band is a registered charity with educational objectives.
