= Cutoff, Georgia =

Unincorporated community in Georgia, U.S.

Coordinates: 32°16′36″N 84°03′14″W

Cutoff is an unincorporated community in Macon County, in the U.S. state of Georgia.

== History ==
The community's name is derived from a local petition to transfer jurisdiction of the town site (i.e. "cut off") from Sumter County to Macon County for the convenience of the area residents.
