= Martins Heron railway station =

Railway station in the town of Bracknell, Berkshire, England

Coordinates: 51.408°N 0.725°W

Martins Heron
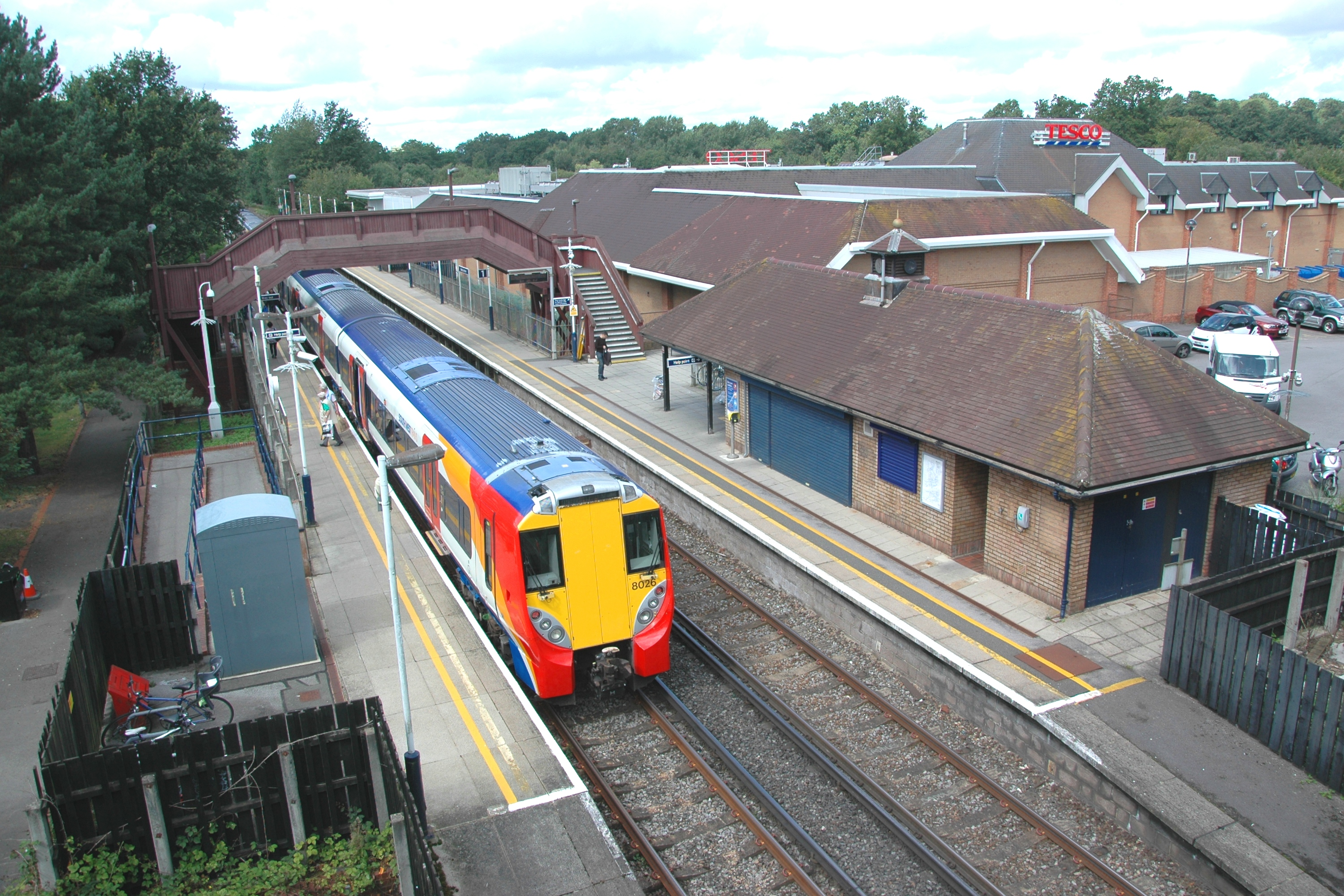

General information
- Location: Bracknell, Bracknell Forest; England
- Grid reference: SU887683
- Manager: South Western Railway
- Platforms: 2

Other information
- Station code: MAO
- Classification: DfT category D

History
- Opened: 3 October 1988

Passengers
- 2021/22: ▲0.302 million
- 2022/23: ▲0.346 million
- 2023/24: ▲0.376 million
- 2024/25: ▲0.433 million
- 2025/26: ▲0.453 million
Location
Notes
- Passenger statistics from the Office of Rail and Road

Martins Heron railway station serves Martins Heron, a suburb on the eastern edge of Bracknell, Berkshire, England. It is 31 miles 9 chains (50.1 km) down the line from London Waterloo, between Ascot and Bracknell on the Waterloo to Reading line.

The station, and all trains serving it, are operated by South Western Railway.

== History ==
To support the eastward expansion of Bracknell in the 1980s, British Rail opened the station at Martins Heron on 3 October 1988. This was the eighth new station opened by Network SouthEast in two years, and cost £500,000, which was jointly met by BR and Berkshire County Council. The platforms and part of the station building were built on railway land, but the access road and car park are on land owned by Tesco. This land, and part of the building costs, were contributed by Tesco as a condition of being granted planning permission for a supermarket. The station building was a brick chalet construction, which was far more attractive than the 1970s concrete buildings seen at many other stations on the line.

Just to the east of the station, the local road passes over the railway on a bridge and there is a footpath underneath. In line with the local council policy of decorating all pedestrian underpasses, they commissioned two railway-themed murals for the overbridge walls in 1989. On the north wall is a Great Western scene and on the south wall, a Southern railway scene. Both are visible from passing trains and remain remarkably undamaged.

== Description ==
Martins Heron has two basic platforms with entrances on both platforms, and a wooden footbridge joining them. Platform 1 has a ticket office and enclosed waiting room, that is open in the morning, 7 days a week. Both platforms have a ticket machine and shelter, and were originally long enough for eight coach trains. In 2016 they were extended to the east to accommodate ten coach trains as part of South West Trains' project to increase capacity on their major routes.

The station is accessed via the Tesco supermarket delivery access road and has a small car park for around 40 cars, along with 2 disabled spaces and cycle lockers. Unusually, as the car park is on land owned by the supermarket, there are no charges for parking, making it popular amongst commuters. Originally, the supermarket also allowed commuters to use the main supermarket car park, but in 2010 they implemented a 3-hour maximum parking time to discourage commuters as the car park was getting too full. For similar reasons, most of the local side streets have a parking restriction between 11am and 12pm to discourage commuters leaving their cars in this residential area.

== Services ==
All services at Martins Heron are operated by South Western Railway.

The typical off-peak service in trains per hour is:

- 2 tph to London Waterloo via Richmond
- 2 tph to Reading

Additional services call at the station during the peak hours.

Preceding station	National Rail	Following station
Ascot	South Western Railway Waterloo to Reading Line	Bracknell
