= Bracknell railway station =

Railway station serving the town of Bracknell, Berkshire, England

Bracknell
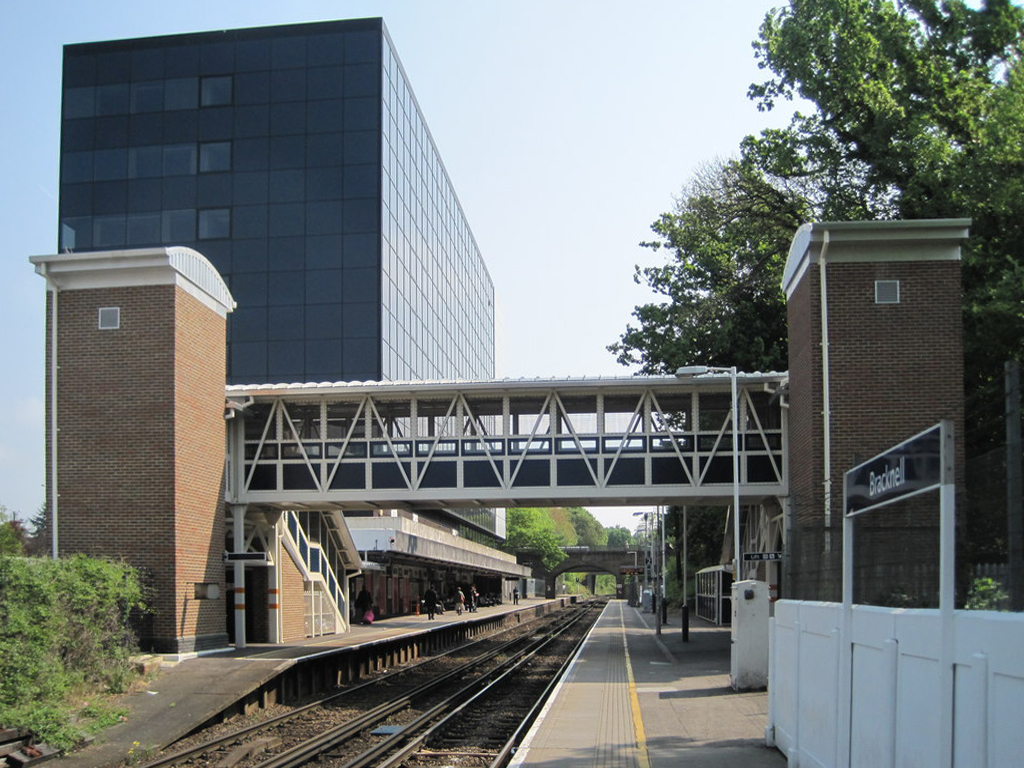

General information
- Location: Bracknell, Bracknell Forest; England
- Coordinates: 51°24′47″N 0°45′07″W
- Grid reference: SU869689
- Managed by: South Western Railway
- Platforms: 2

Other information
- Station code: BCE
- Classification: DfT category C2

History
- Opened: 9 July 1856
- Original company: Staines and Wokingham Railway
- Pre-grouping: London and South Western Railway
- Post-grouping: Southern Railway

Passengers
- 2020/21: ▼0.470 million
- 2021/22: ▲1.191 million
- 2022/23: ▲1.491 million
- Interchange: 132
- 2023/24: ▲1.602 million
- Interchange: ▲12,681
- 2024/25: ▲1.775 million
- Interchange: ▲19,538
Location
Notes
- Passenger statistics from the Office of Rail and Road

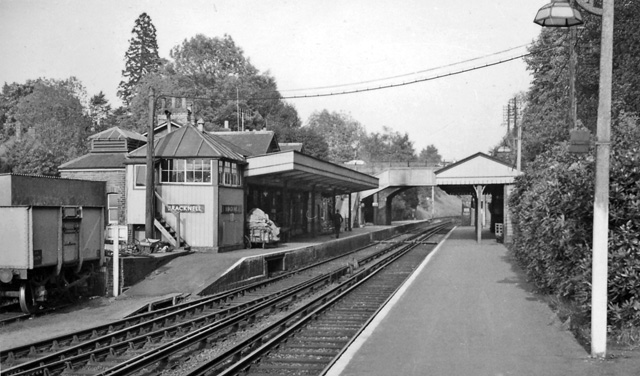
Bracknell station in 1961

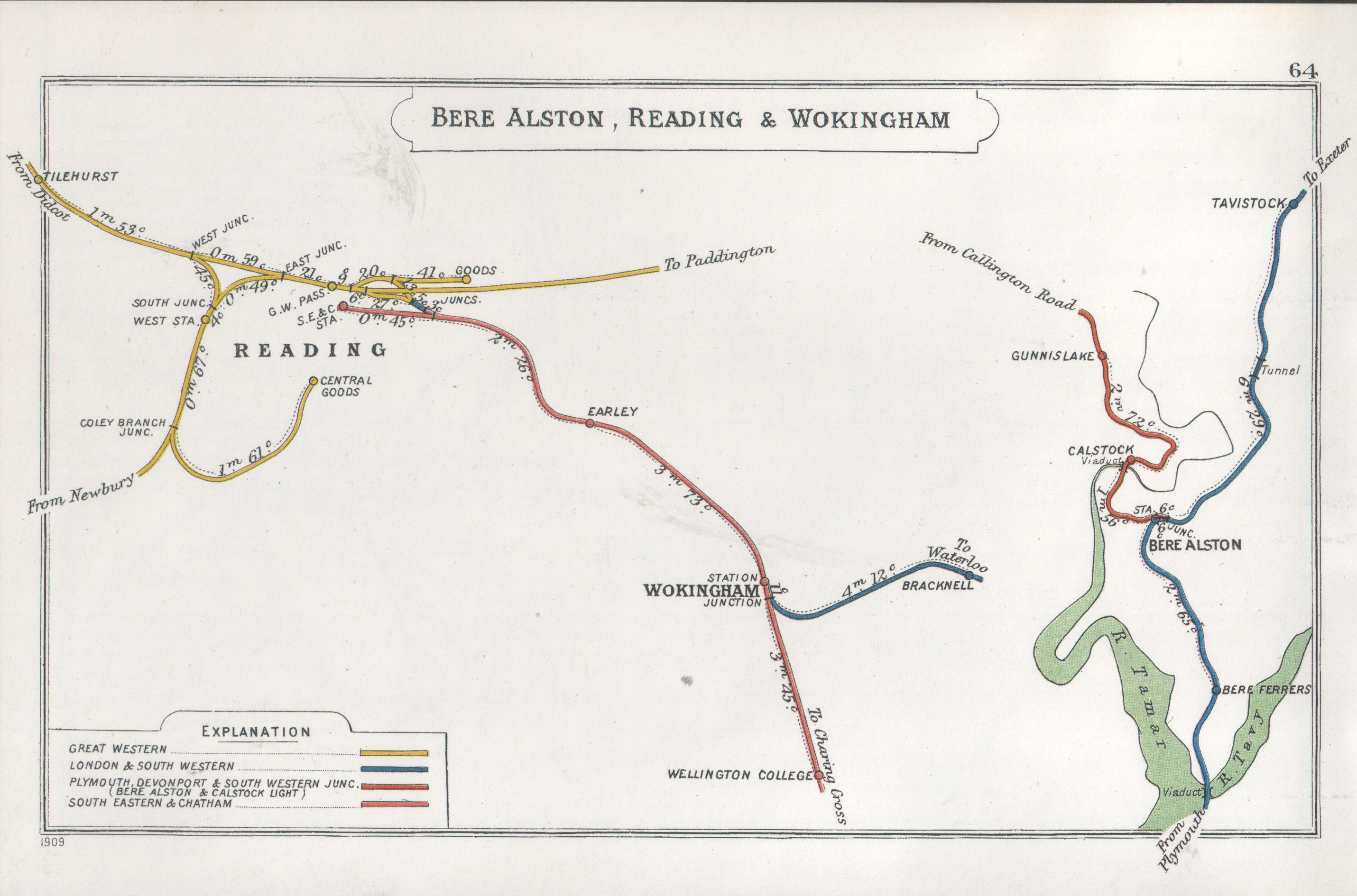
A 1909 Railway Clearing House map of lines around Reading

Bracknell railway station serves the Berkshire town of Bracknell. It is 32 miles 24 chains (52.0 km) down the line from London Waterloo.

The station, and all trains serving it, are operated by South Western Railway. It is on the Waterloo to Reading line.

== History ==
The station was opened in 1856 by the Staines and Wokingham Railway which was taken over by the London and South Western Railway in 1878. British Railways closed the goods yard in 1969. The station was redeveloped in 1975, and the entrance is now under the Bracknell Quintiles building.

== Services ==
All services at Bracknell are operated by South Western Railway.

The typical off-peak service in trains per hour is:

- 2 tph to London Waterloo via Richmond
- 2 tph to Reading

Additional services call at the station during the peak hours.

Preceding station	National Rail	Following station
Martins Heron	South Western Railway Waterloo to Reading Line	Wokingham

== Improvements ==
In 2008, work began to improve access for passengers with wheelchairs, baby-vehicles or bicycles. A new covered footbridge, with both staircases and lifts, was completed and opened in 2009. Before this, the only way to reach the "Down" (Reading-bound) platform was over the steps of the original footbridge at the London end of the platforms. This was a classic Southern Railway design with no roof, built of pre-cast concrete sections. It had also provided direct access from Crowthorne Road North, but this extra span had long been disconnected. Once the new bridge was opened, the old bridge was taken out of use and fenced off. It was demolished in May 2009. In 2017, the platforms were extended to accommodate 10 to 12 car trains with the increase of passengers on the line.
