= Trafalgar House (company) =

British conglomerate

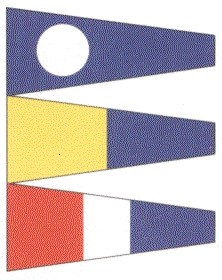
- Type: Public limited company
- Industry: Property, engineering, construction, shipping, hotels, energy and publishing
- Founded: 1963
- Defunct: 1996
- Fate: Acquired
- Successor: Kvaerner
- Headquarters: London, England
- Key people: Sir Nigel Broackes (Chairman)

Trafalgar House was a British conglomerate with interests in property investment, property development, engineering, construction, shipping, hotels, energy and publishing. It was listed on the London Stock Exchange and was a constituent of the FTSE 100 Index. During its later years of operation, it was routinely referred to as being the largest contracting organisation in the UK.

The entrepreneur Nigel Broackes, who would be the chairman of Trafalgar House throughout much of its existence, played a key role in the company's emergence during the late 1950s and early 1960s. Broackes worked with the Eastern International Investment Trust and Commercial Union to build a portfolio of assets that would be the initial footings of the company. Shortly after its floatation during 1963, Trafalgar House leveraged the issuing of shares to fuel its acquisition of various other businesses, which included The Cementation Company, John Brown Engineering, Cleveland Bridge, Redpath Dorman Long, Ideal Homes, Comben Homes, Broseley Homes, Cunard, British Rail Engineering Limited, and Express Newspapers.

Trafalgar's growth strategy consisted of direct investments and acquisitions continued throughout the 1970s and 1980s. However, its decision to continue making heavy investments on the runup to the early 1990s recession, alongside fiscal reporting issues identified by the Financial Reporting Review Panel, led to the company's accounts for 1992 being restated from a £112.5 million profit to a £30 million loss along with a £347 million loss being recorded in 1993. Broackes stepped down as Trafalgar's chairman and Jardine Matheson purchased a 25 percent stake in the company, leading to Simon Keswick becoming chairman. Trafalgar's fiscal performance remained unsatisfactory throughout the mid-1990s. The Norwegian shipbuilding and engineering group Kværner acquired Trafalgar House on 18 April 1996. In the following years, Kværner divested many of the ex-Trafalgar subsidiaries.

== History ==
The origins of Trafalgar House are closely linked with the activities of Nigel Broackes, an entrepreneur whose interests in share dealing and small scale property development brought him into contact with the directors of the Eastern International Investment Trust, a small trust quoted on the London Stock Exchange. During 1959, Broackes acquired a 42 per cent holding in Eastern's property subsidiary, Eastern International Property Investments (EIPI). Two years later, Broackes formed a relationship with Commercial Union, which also bought shares in EIPI and prepared to act as a financial backer for new property developments. Almost immediately, EIPI bought a 55 per cent stake in CU's residential property subsidiary Westminster & Kensington Freeholds, thereby acquiring control of a property portfolio of £3.3 million for an equity cost of only £550.

During 1963, Trafalgar House was floated on the London Stock Exchange, at which point Commercial Union owned 46 per cent of the business while Broackes held a 21 per cent stake. The existence of a public quotation enabled Trafalgar House to issue shares for acquisition, a facility that Broackes made extensive use for the company to become a formidable international industrial and commercial undertaking. Both acquisitions and direct investments were primary vehicles used for growth; typical targets of attention were businesses operating in the construction and engineering sectors. These would form a corporate group, the creation and performance of which was largely attributed to Broackes, who gained a reputation as a particularly successful financier.

An acquisition with significant long term consequences for the company was a 49% share of Bridge Walker in 1964 (increased to full ownership in 1967). Bridge Walker had been carrying out much of Trafalgar's construction work but, apart from giving Trafalgar House its own contracting experience, the deal also brought in the owner, Victor Matthews, later to become Trafalgar's group managing director. With Matthews and Broackes working together, acquisitions became high-profile. In that same year Trafalgar House bought Ideal Homes; Ideal had been the largest private house builder in the UK before the Second World War; under its new ownership, it soon expanded once again. The long-established London contractor, Trollope & Colls, was acquired at the end of the year.

Trafalgar House continued to expand across a period of 20 years, during which time acquisitions played a major role. In the construction and engineering sector, these included The Cementation Company, John Brown Engineering, Cleveland Bridge and Redpath Dorman Long. Housebuilding saw the acquisition of two top ten housebuilders, Comben Homes and Broseley Homes. Trafalgar’s property development had led to the purchase of hotels but the high-profile acquisition was of the Ritz Hotel in 1976. Trafalgar also entered fields that were far removed from its original property development and construction roots with the purchase of Cunard in 1971 and Beaverbrook's Express Newspapers in 1976. Matthews' attentions were largely focussed on Express and this was floated as a separate entity in 1982 with Matthews as chairman.

In the course of thirty years or so, Trafalgar House became a formidable international industrial and commercial undertaking. During the final few years of its existence, it was consistently tabled as the largest contracting organisation in the UK.

== Divisions or operating areas ==
A conglomerate by nature is usually a dynamic entity and fluid in its structure and content. For the purpose of this historical perspective, a general indication only is given of the scope of industries, operations and companies embraced by Trafalgar House during its existence.

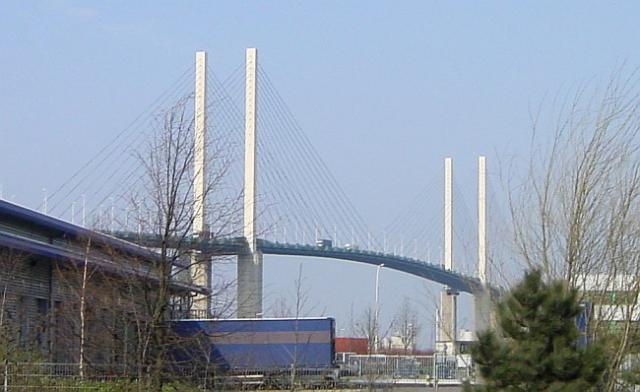
Cementation (Major Projects) — Cleveland Bridge & Engineering) Queen Elizabeth II Bridge over the River Thames at Dartford

=== Hotels ===
The Ritz Hotel in London was acquired by Trafalgar House in 1976. It was subsequently sold to David & Frederick Barclay in exchange for £75 million in 1995.

=== Property ===
In 1980, there was public outcry at the sudden destruction by Trafalgar House of the Art Deco main entrance to the former Firestone tyre factory (designed by Wallis, Gilbert & Partners, 1928–29) in Brentford, which had been torn down over the August bank holiday weekend to (legally) pre-empt and thus nullify an imminent preservation order under the listed buildings legislation. The company was due to embark on the West Cross Development, an extensive redevelopment of the large industrial site, which would have been seriously hampered by a requirement to maintain both the lengthy architectural facade of the old factory and its broad approach sightlines and boundary features.

During 1988, Trafalgar House was involved in a joint development with British Aerospace to redevelop the former Royal Small Arms Factory site at Enfield to create Enfield Island Village.

In 1995, it bought the bomb-damaged site of the historic Baltic Exchange building, at 30 St Mary Axe in London, which had been severely damaged when the Provisional Irish Republican Army detonated a bomb nearby on 10 April 1992. The building's former owner, the Baltic Exchange, was unable to bear the costs of fully restoring the building to English Heritage's requirements and thus sold the site to Trafalgar House. During 1998, the site was resold, with planning permission, for £81 million to Swiss Re, who commissioned and occupied the renowned Gherkin building, designed by Foster + Partners.

=== Housebuilding ===
Trafalgar bought Ideal Homes in 1967. It had been the pre-eminent private housebuilder before the Second World War, recording sales in excess of 5,000 houses per year but, by the time of the acquisition, it was building little more than 1,000 per year. New management enabled Ideal to grow again and the size of the division was increased by the acquisition of two other large housebuilders: Comben Homes in 1984 and Broseley Homes in 1986. By 1987, Ideal was again selling around 5,000 houses per year. During the mid 1990s, Ideal proved to be an attractive prospect for several companies to acquire from Trafalgar, although the sales process proved to be somewhat challenging.

=== Shipping ===
Trafalgar House acquired the Cunard group of shipping and leisure companies in 1971. At the time of the acquisition, Cunard operated cargo and passenger ships, hotels and resorts; its fleet comprised forty-two active cargo ships, with fourteen more under construction, as well as three passenger ships, with two more under construction. But, twelve years later, the cargo fleet had shrunk to eighteen, half of which were by then container ships, while the size of the passenger fleet had remained constant.

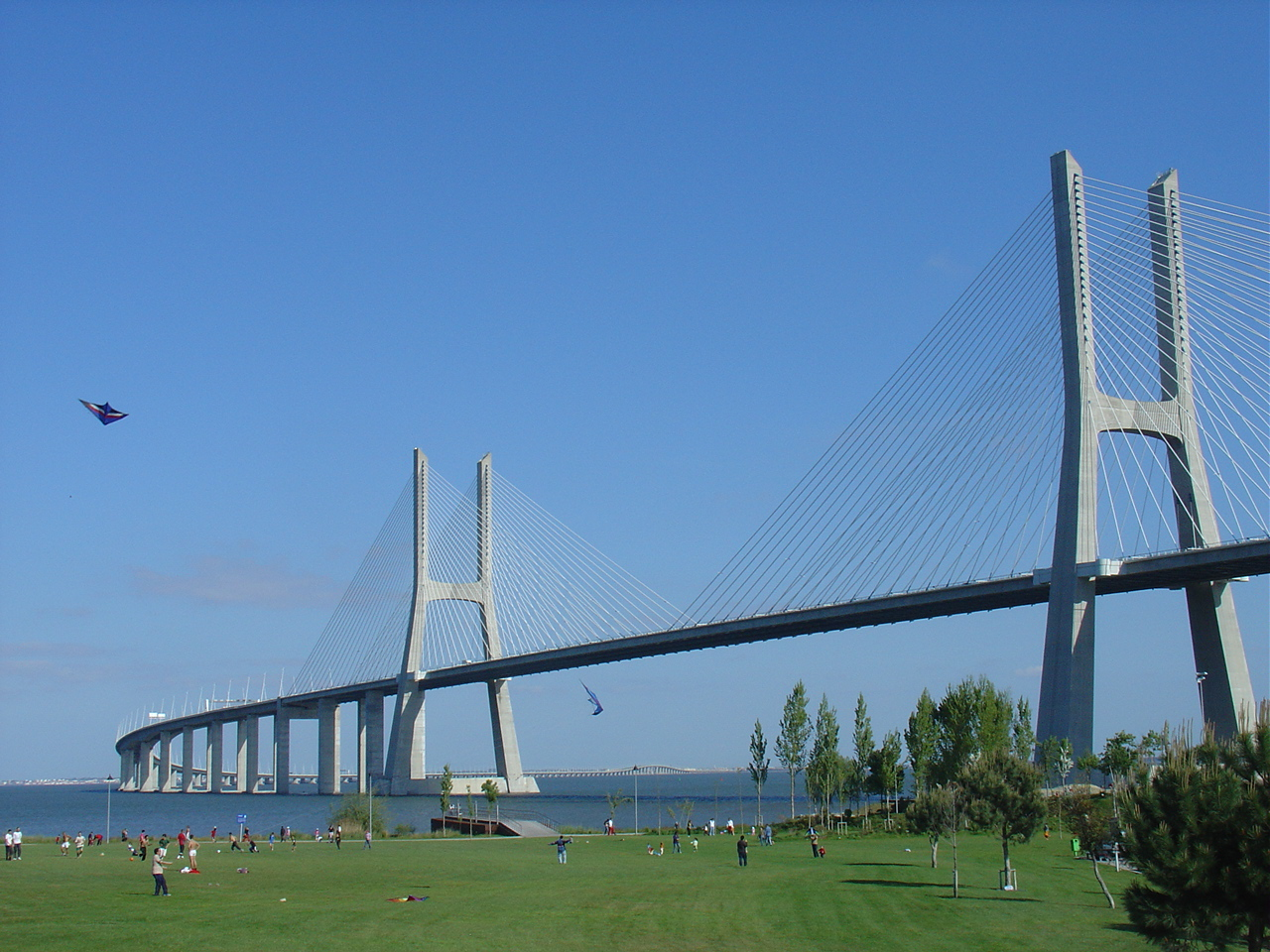
Vasco da Gama Bridge over the Tagus Estuary, Lisbon, Portugal. THC were appointed head of the construction consortium in 1995 and were awarded twenty-six percent of the work on this 17 kilometre elevated roadway structure.

=== Construction ===
In 1964, Trafalgar House bought 49 percent of Bridge Walker (increased to full ownership in 1967). At the end of the following year it bought Trollope & Colls. From then on the prime umbrella operating division, in terms of turnover and revenue, was Trafalgar House Construction; generally referred to both inside the company and within the industry as 'THC'. As the division grew in scope and stature it was responsible for more and more large international projects.

=== Engineering ===
In 1986, Trafalgar House acquired John Brown Engineering, which built industrial gas turbines and also implemented licensed processes, such as the Union Carbide Corporation Polyethylene Plant. The basic processes were engineered to fit the purchaser's requirements, including the site plan, the production capacity, the raw material feedstock, and other constraints.

During 1989, Trafalgar House purchased a 40% shareholding in British Rail Engineering Limited (BREL). Three years later, the stake in BREL was sold to fellow shareholder Asea Brown Boveri.

In 1992, Trafalgar House acquired the Davy Corporation, a group of international engineering companies which also included a well-established UK wide construction division, in exchange for £114 million.

== Decline and disposal ==
As the early 1990s recession approached, Trafalgar continued to invest heavily: some £750 million had been invested in commercial property alone between 1988 and the first half of 1990. Moreover, interest was not being charged to the profit and loss account but capitalised, and substantial borrowings were being carried off the balance sheet. During 1991, the Financial Reporting Review Panel threatened to apply for a court order that would require Trafalgar to charge a £142.5 million reduction in asset values through the profit and loss account rather than through reserves, which eventually led to directors restating their 1992 accounts from a £112.5 million profit to a £30 million loss. Massive provisions led to a £347 million loss being recorded in 1993, which made Trafalgar itself a potential takeover target. Amid these heavy losses, Broackes stepped down from his position.

Trafalgar's far-east associates, Jardine Matheson, invested in Trafalgar House and initially took a fifteen percent stake in the company, which was later increased to twenty-five per cent. The vehicle used for this investment was Jardine's property subsidiary Hong Kong Land. Jardines is controlled by the Keswick family, a dynasty of Scottish origin; thus Simon Keswick took the chair at Trafalgar House in 1994. Despite this change in management, the company's fortunes continued to slide.

On 18 April 1996, Norwegian shipbuilding and engineering group Kværner acquired Trafalgar House following a £904 million offer. The acquisition provided Kvaerner with a broad-based portfolio of companies with 34,000 staff. During the late 1990s and into the early 2000s, Kvaerner elected to divest itself of numerous divisions that it had acquired through its purchase of Trafalgar.
