= Home construction =

Process of constructing a home

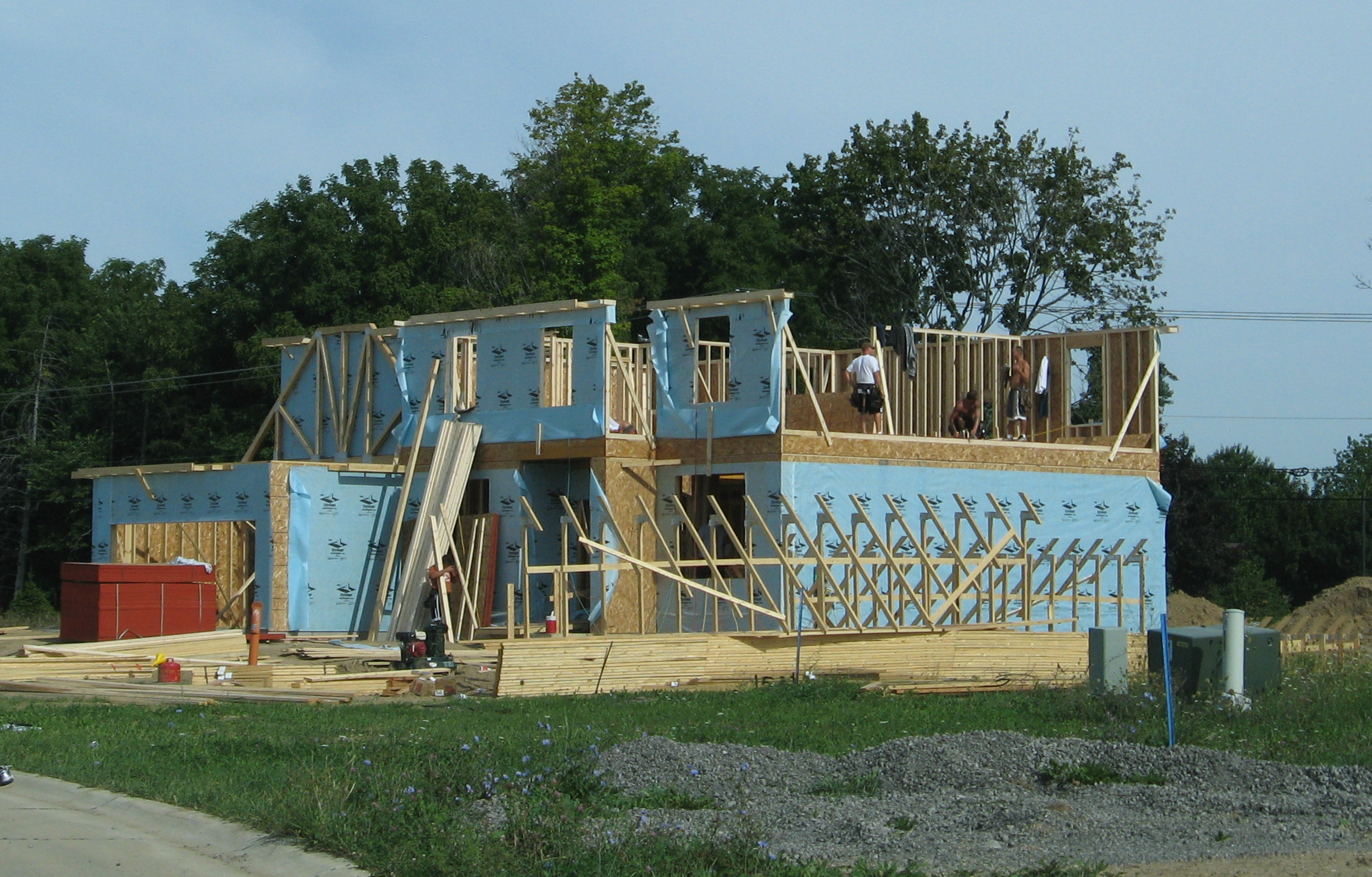
New home construction, Pittsfield Township, Michigan

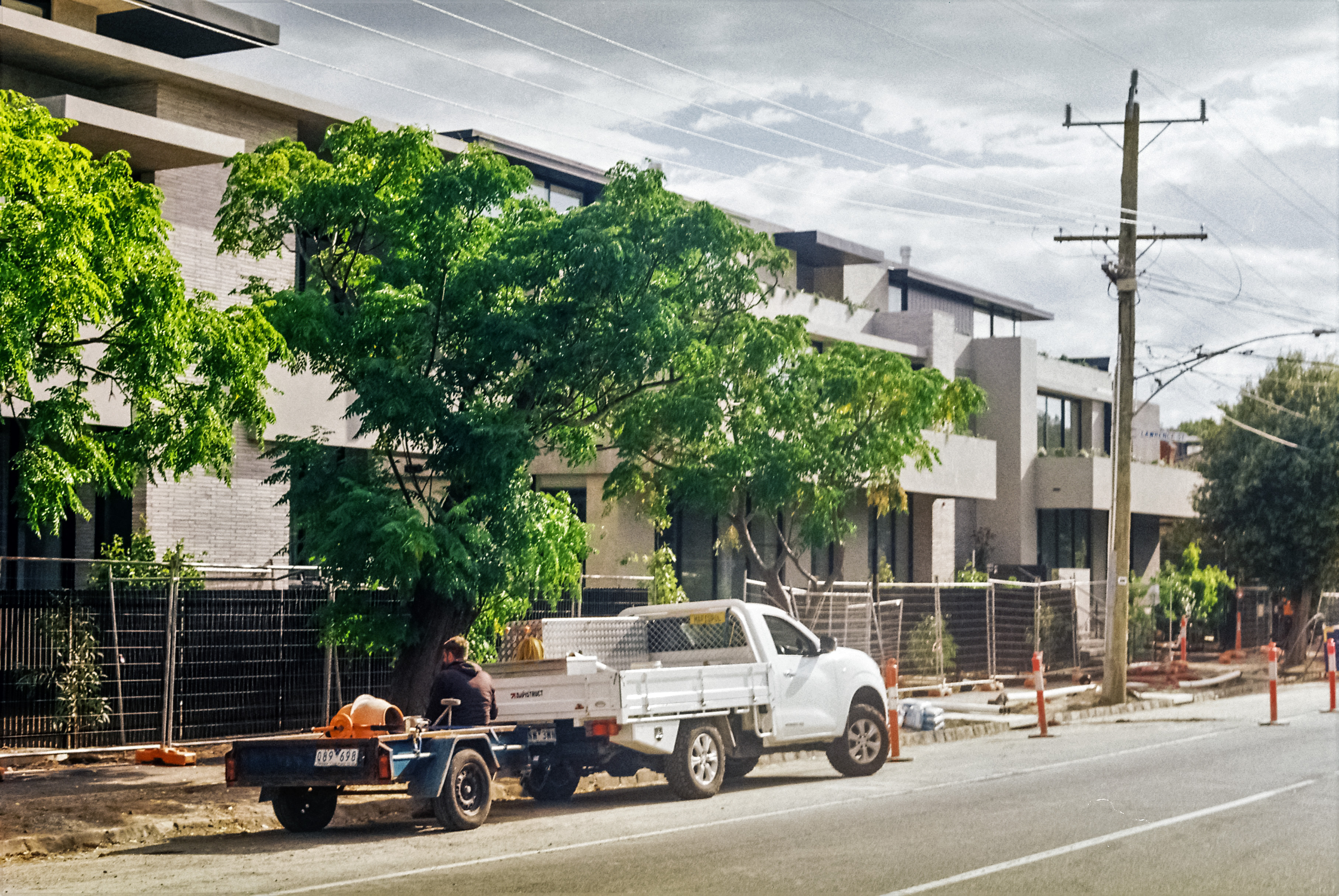
Units under construction in Brighton, Victoria

Home construction, housing construction, or residential construction is the process of constructing a house, apartment building, or similar residential building generally referred to as a 'home' when giving consideration to the people who might now or someday reside there. Beginning with simple pre-historic shelters, home construction techniques have evolved to produce the vast multitude of living accommodations available today. Different levels of wealth and power have warranted various sizes, luxuries, and even defenses in a "home". Environmental considerations and cultural influences have produced an immensely diverse collection of architectural styles, yielding a wide array of possible home structures.

The cost of housing and access to it is often controlled by the modern realty trade, which frequently has a certain level of market force speculation. The level of economic activity in the home-construction sector is reported as housing starts, though this is measured in terms of distinct housing units, rather than distinct construction efforts. 'Housing' is also the chosen term in the related concepts of housing tenure, affordable housing, and housing unit (aka dwelling). Four of the primary trades involved in home construction are carpenters, masons, electricians and plumbers, but there are many others as well.

Global access to homes is not consistent around the world, with many economies not providing adequate support for the right to housing. Sustainable Development Goal 11 includes a goal to create "adequate, safe, and affordable housing and basic services and upgrade slums". Based on current and expected global population growth, UN habitat projects needing 96,000 new dwelling units built each day to meet global demands. An important part of housing construction to meet this global demand, is upgrading and retrofitting existing buildings to provide adequate housing.

== History ==
While homes may have originated in pre-history, there are many notable stages through which cultures pass to reach the current level of modernization. Countries and communities throughout the world currently exhibit very diverse concepts of housing, at many different stages of home development.

Building construction underway in 1909

== Finding or buying parts ==
Two methods for constructing a home can be distinguished: the method in which architects simply assume free choice of materials and parts, and the method in which reclaimed materials are used, and the house is thus during its entire construction a "work in progress" (meaning every single aspect of it is subject to change at any given time, depending on what materials are found). The second method has been used throughout history, as materials have always been scarce.

In Britain, there is comparatively little demand for innovative homes produced through radically different production methods, materials, and components. Over the years, a combination of trade protectionism and technical-product conservatism all round has also stymied the growth of indigenous producers of housing products such as aluminum cladding and curtain walling, wall tiles, advanced specialist ironmongery, and structural steel.

== Specifications ==
The document set needed to construct a new home includes civil site plans, architectural drawings, and specifications. Specifications consist of a precise description of the materials to be used in construction: these are typically organized by each trade required to construct a home.

A modern family home has many systems and facets of construction. With sufficient study, an average person can understand everything there is to know about any given phase of home construction. The do it yourself (DIY) boom of the late twentieth century was due, in large part, to this fact. In New Zealand, a proliferation of kitset home and prefabricated home suppliers, often consisting of components of Chinese origin has further increased supply and made DIY home building more prevalent.

== Procedures ==
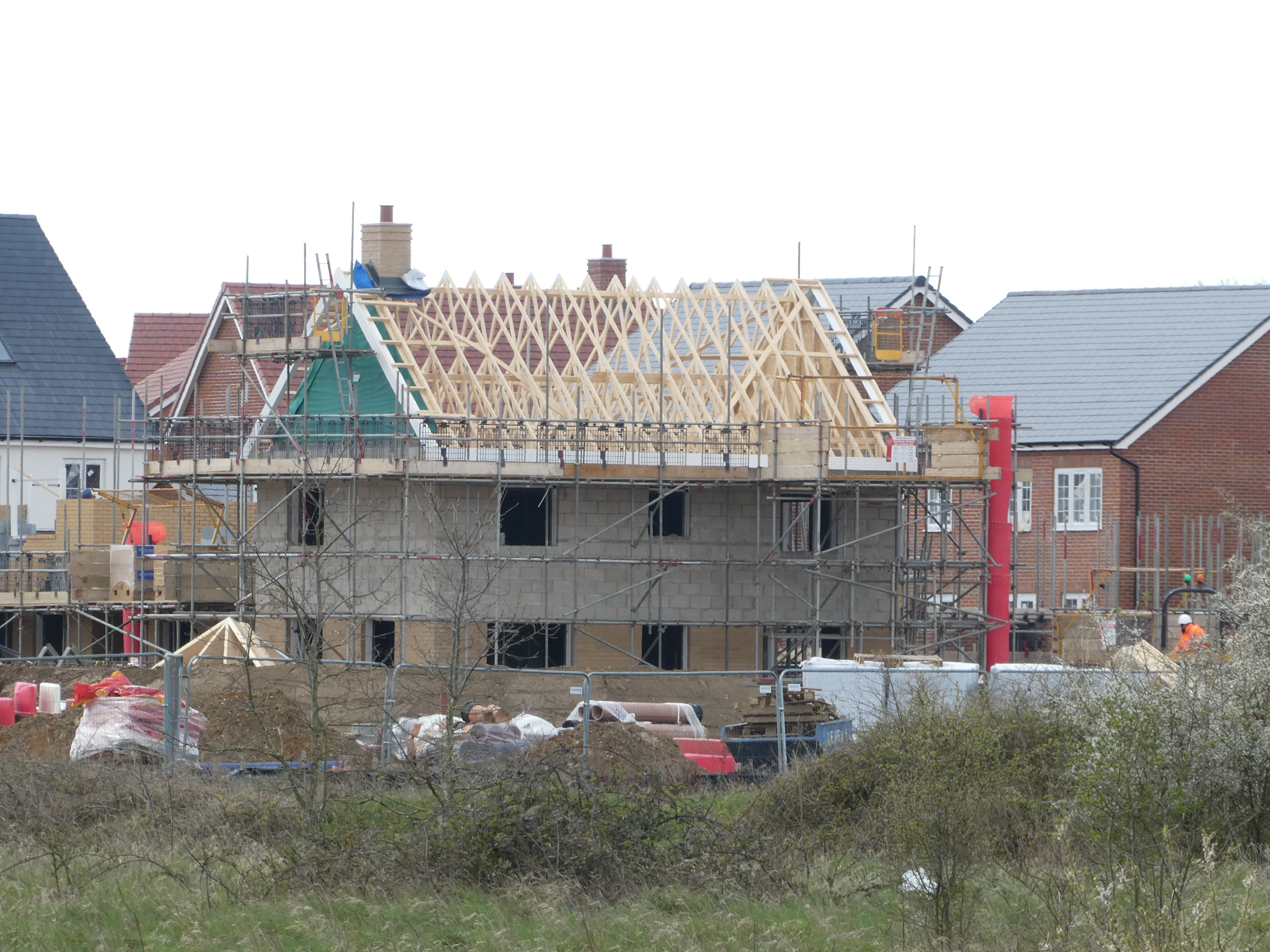
A new house under construction, Wymondham

The process often starts with a planning stage in which plans are prepared by an architect and approved by the client and any regulatory authority. Land may need to be acquired.

Then the site is cleared, foundations are laid and trenches for connection to services such as sewerage, water, and electricity are established. If the house is wooden-framed, a framework is constructed to support the boards, siding and roof. If the house is of brick construction, then courses of bricks are laid to construct the walls. Floors, beams and internal walls are constructed as the building develops, with plumbing and wiring for water and electricity being installed as appropriate. Once the main structure is complete, internal fitting with lights and other fitments is done, Decorate home and furnished with furniture, cupboards, carpets, curtains and other fittings.

Some clients or builders consider building a house in phases. This phased approach allows homeowners to prioritize essential components of the house, such as the foundation, structure, and basic utilities, while deferring less critical elements to later phases. It provides the flexibility to pause construction temporarily, if necessary, and resume when funds become available.

== Costs ==
The cost of building a house varies by country widely. According to data from the National Association of Realtors, the median cost of buying an existing single-family house in the United States is $274,600, whereas the average cost to build is $296,652 in 2025.

Several different factors can impact the cost of building a house, including the size of the dwelling, the location, and availability of resources, the slope of the land, the quality of the fixtures and fittings, and the difficulty in finding construction and building materials talent. Some of the typical expenses involved in a site cost can be connections to services such as water, sewer, electricity, and gas; fences; retaining walls; site clearance (trees, roots, bushes); site survey; soil tests.

== Phases ==
=== Preparatory stages ===
- Architectural design
- Building code

=== External construction ===
- Shallow foundation
- Light-frame construction or Post-frame construction
- Domestic water system
- Electrical wiring
- Building envelope
- Retaining walls

=== Internal construction ===
- Ventilation
- Plumbing
- Air conditioning
- Electrical wiring
- Telephone wiring
- Ethernet wiring
- Insulation
- Flooring
- Wall
- Ceilings
- Doors
- Windows

=== Finishing construction ===
- Cabinetry
- Furnishings
- Interior decorating
- Painting
- Fixtures
- Appliances
- Toiletry

== Home size ==
According to data from the U.S. Census and Bureau of Labor Statistics found the average floor area of a home in the United States has steadily increased over the past one hundred years, with an estimated 18.5 square foot increase in the average floor area per year. In 1920, the average floor area was 1,048 square feet (97.4 m^{2}), which rose to 1,500 square feet (140 m^{2}) by 1970 and today sits at around 2,261 square feet (210.1 m^{2}).

== Criticism ==
Some have criticized the housebuilding industry. Mass housebuilders can be risk averse, preferring cost-efficient building methods rather than adopting new technologies for improved building performance. Traditional vernacular building methods that suit local conditions and climates can be dispensed with in favour of a generic 'cookie-cutter' housing type.

== See also ==
- Real estate development
