= Haydon School =

Location
- Wiltshire Lane; Eastcote; Pinner, Greater London, HA5 2LX; England; 51°35′41″N 0°24′49″W

Information
- Type: Academy
- Established: 1977
- Local authority: Hillingdon
- Department for Education URN: 136519 Tables
- Ofsted: Reports
- Chair of Governors: Tanya Huehns
- Head teacher: Cleo de Jong
- Gender: Mixed
- Age: 11 to 18
- Enrolment: 1677
- Colours: Navy and Gold
- Website: http://www.haydonschool.com

Haydon School is a mixed secondary school and sixth form in the Northwood Hills area of the London Borough of Hillingdon, Greater London, for students aged 11 to 18. On 1 April 2011, Haydon School became an Academy.

== History ==
The school was formed in September 1977 from the union of St Nicholas Grammar School and St Mary's Grammar School for Girls.

It was named after the local family, as was Haydon Hall. Alice Spencer, Countess of Derby, had the hall built in 1630.

== Languages ==
Haydon was a designated language college teaching students foreign languages.

At GCSE-Level, the school offers Latin and community languages as well as: Arabic, Bengali, Greek, Gujarati, Hebrew, Hindi, Punjabi, Persian, Polish, Portuguese, Russian, Turkish, Urdu

== The campus ==
=== The Dobson Library ===
The Dobson Library was opened in 1996 and named after the retiring headteacher - David Dobson.

=== The Peter Woods Building ===
The Peter Woods building was opened on Thursday 9 July 2009 by former headmaster and namesake Peter Woods.

=== Sixth Form Building ===
Haydon School has over 500 students in its sixth form. It offers advanced level courses on site.

== Notable alumni ==
For notable pupils of St Nicholas Grammar School, see that article.

- Luisa Bradshaw-White — actress
- Mark Paterson — Oscar and BAFTA winning sound engineer
