= St Nicholas Grammar School =

St. Nicholas Grammar School for Boys

Location
- Wiltshire Lane; Northwood Hills, Greater London, HA5 2LX; England; 51°35′41″N 0°24′49″W

Information
- Type: State grammar school
- Established: 1955
- Closed: 1977
- Local authority: Hillingdon
- Ofsted: Reports
- Headmasters: RFE Watson (1955); LE Shearn (1976)
- Staff: 40-45 (full-time)
- Gender: Male
- Age: 11 to 18
- Enrolment: 650 students
- Houses: Abbots, Kevere, Bec, Kings
- Colours: Purple and Gold
- Publication: St.Nicholas School Magazine (annually)

St Nicholas Grammar School was a grammar school, located in Northwood Hills, in the London Borough of Hillingdon, Middlesex. In 1977, it joined with the neighbouring St. Mary's Grammar School for Girls to form Haydon School.

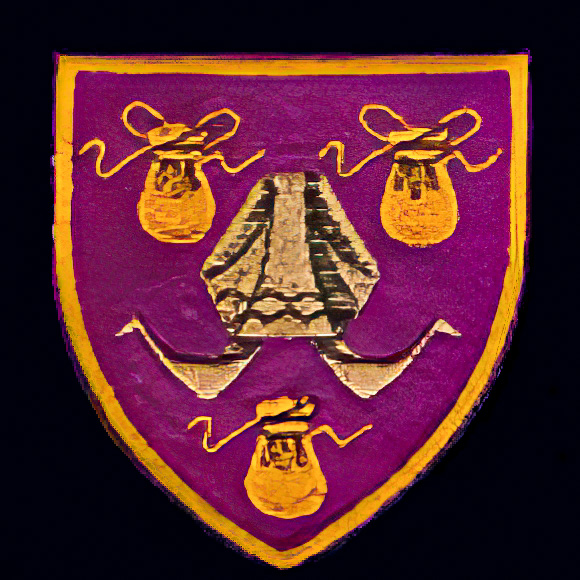
St. Nicholas Grammar School Crest

== History ==
Approval to begin construction of St Nicholas Grammar School was granted on 11 May 1953, and the work was undertaken by the construction firm of Holland, Hannen & Cubitts.

In 1954, two forms were established at Bourne Secondary Modern to become the nucleus of pupils, forming 2a and 2b at the new building in 1955.

The grammar school opened in 1955, and ran for 22 years. Its crest was a bishop's mitre surrounded by three money bags. The first headmaster was Dr. Robert Watson (8 March 1910 – 16 July 2004), who assembled the teaching staff during the late winter and early spring of 1955. He held the position until retiring at the end of term 1975.

Robert Watson was succeeded by Leslie Shearn who guided the school through amalgamation with the adjacent girls' school. In 1978, Haydon School changed the crest to a stylised stag's head.

== Houses ==
There were four houses; each with its own staff. Abbotts, which was red, Bec, which was yellow, Kevere, which was green, and Kings, which was blue. They were named after local medieval landowners. A House Assembly was held once per week, on Friday. There were inter-house competitions during the school year; most were in sports, though there were also drama, chess and art competitions.

== Facilities ==
There was a language laboratory, senior and junior science laboratories for chemistry and physics, a school orchestra, a library, workshops for metalwork and woodwork, and several pitches for games. The playing field was shared with St. Mary's Grammar School for Girls.

== Notable alumni ==
- Felix Dennis – publisher. Originally of Oz magazine
- Richard Rosser, Baron Rosser – trade union leader. General Secretary of the Transport Salaried Staffs' Association from 1989 to 2004
