= Highgrove House, Eastcote =

Country house in Eastcote, London

Highgrove House
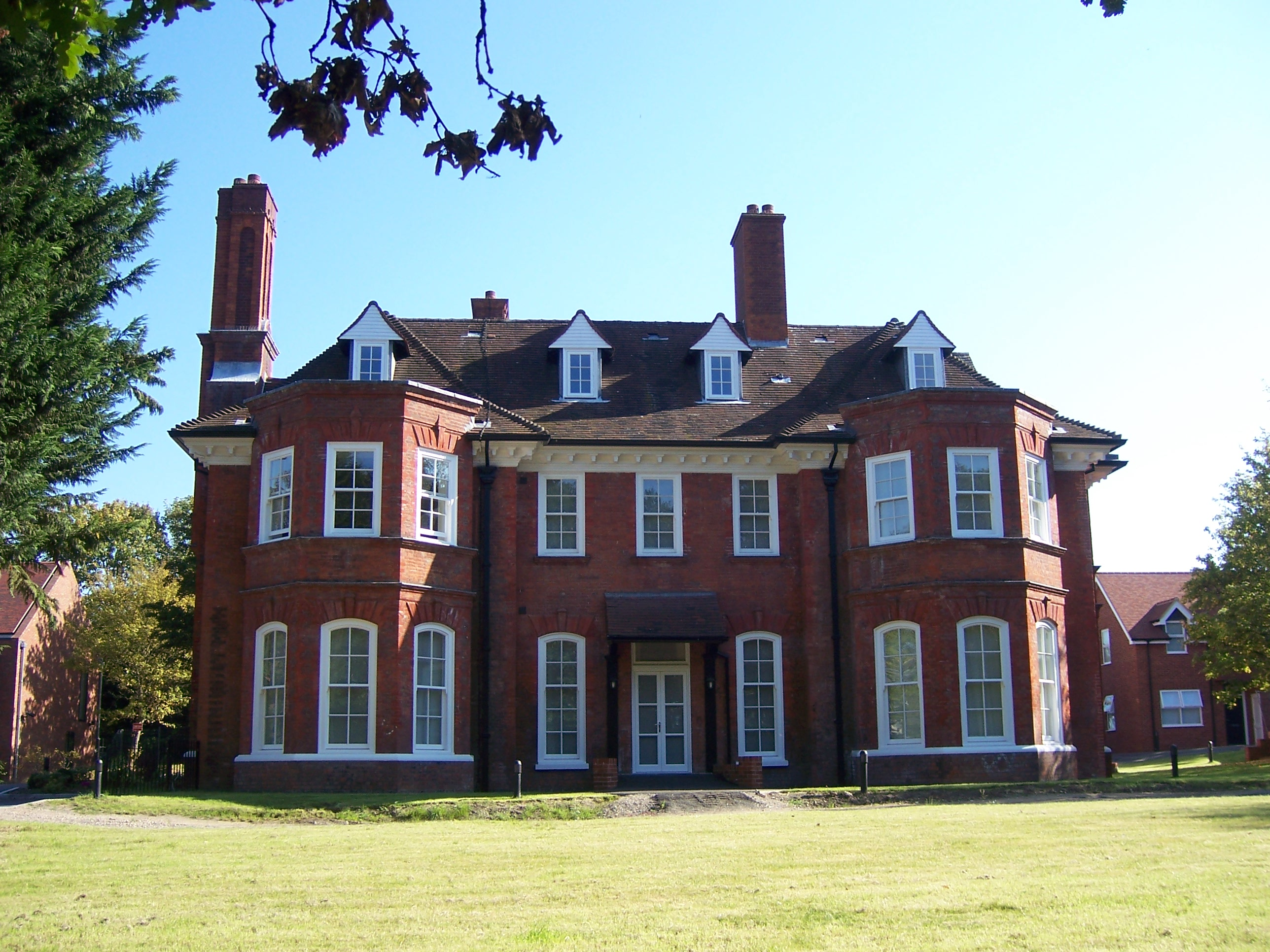
- Highgrove House viewed from the east

- Location within Greater London

General information
- Architectural style: Queen Anne and Early Georgian
- Location: Eastcote, Greater London, England
- Coordinates: 51.581667°N 0.407778°W
- Construction started: 1747 (first house); 1879 (second house)
- Completed: 1750 (first house); 1881 (second house)
- Client: Reverend John Lidgould (first house); Sir Hugh Hume-Campbell (second house)

Design and construction
- Architect: Edward Prior (second house)

Highgrove House, also known as High Grove House or High Grove, is a Grade II listed mansion in the suburban area of Eastcote, within the London Borough of Hillingdon. Originally built in 1750 by the Reverend John Lidgould, the house was rebuilt in 1881 by Sir Hugh Hume-Campbell following a catastrophic fire. Along with Haydon Hall and Eastcote House, Highgrove was one of the three main houses of Eastcote and eventually became a residential hostel for homeless families, run by the local council from the 1960s until 2007. An area of the estate was sold to the local council in 1935 by the then-owner Eleanor Warrender to become what is now Warrender Park. In 1975, the house was granted Grade II listed status on account of its special architectural character.

The house was subsequently closed as a hostel by the council and sold for £1.295m to Westcombe Estates. Planning permission was granted to the new owners in January 2007 for the conversion of the building into a luxury housing block of 12 units and expanded for a further three years in February 2010.

== History ==
=== First house ===
The site of the present house was originally owned and lived on by the Hale family in the 13th century. Reverend John Lidgould of Harmondsworth bought part of the land owned by Martha Hale and Elizabeth Kelly in 1747 and had the first house built.

Robert Turner bought the house and lived there from 1758; his son sold it in 1787 to the canon of Wells Cathedral, William Blencowe. John Humphrey Babb leased the house from the early 19th century, purchasing it outright from the Blencowe family in 1813. Upon his death in 1825, his successor as Deliverer of the Vote in the House of Commons, James Mitchell, moved to the house, living there until his own death in 1833. His widow subsequently sold Highgrove at auction.

In 1843, the house was bought by Lieutenant General Joseph Fuller. Days before his death, his daughter Juliana married Sir Hugh Hume-Campbell in October 1841. Ownership based to Fuller's daughter, the new Lady Hume-Campbell, although in 1879 the house was destroyed by fire. The Uxbridge Volunteer Fire Brigade with assistance from a pump provided by Pinner Hall were unable to save the building.

=== Second house ===
The ruins of the house were cleared following the fire, and Sir Hugh contracted Edward Schroeder Prior to design the new house, which was completed in 1881. Prior followed the Queen Anne and early Georgian architecture styles in his design, which is based around an "L" shape with a southern extension for the house's domestic services. Highgrove was built of red brick, with two storeys and an attic. The window arches were also made of brick. On the ground floor facing the gardens, three sets of three windows in bays were included. Prior's design drawings for the house were shown in an exhibition at the Royal Academy in 1882.

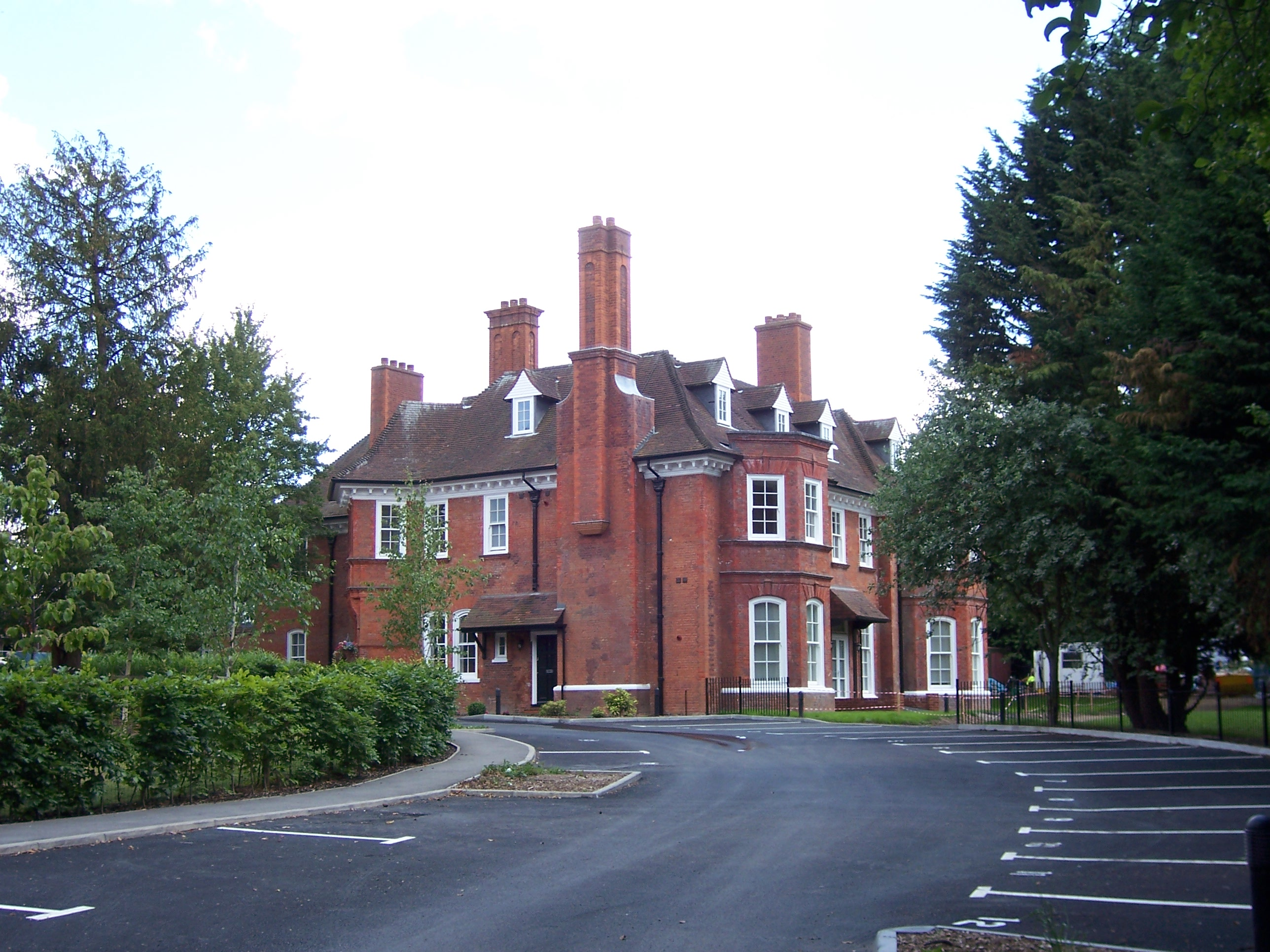
South-eastern view of the house from the drive

The Hume-Campbells had no children, and the house eventually passed to the Warrender family in 1894, who, as the grandchildren of Sir Hugh from his first marriage, were the next of kin. Brother and sister Hugh and Eleanor Warrender shared the house and were friends with Jenny Churchill, the mother of the future British prime minister Winston Churchill. He stayed at the house for his honeymoon in the early 1900s.

In 1935, Eleanor Warrender sold 10.5 acres (4.2 ha) of the grounds of the house to the local council to establish a new playground and park, now named Warrender Park, and 13 acres (5.3 ha) to Ideal Homes for a residential development. During the Second World War, she made Highgrove available to the military, and British and American personnel from RAF Northolt stayed there.

Highgrove was bought by the Ruislip-Northwood Urban District Council in 1949 following Eleanor Warrender's death. The Council gave it to the Middlesex County Council and the house became a home for the elderly. In 1965, ownership passed to the newly established London Borough of Hillingdon and Highgrove became a residential hostel for homeless families. The house received Grade II listed status on 26 November 1975 due to its special architectural character, though was slightly damaged by a fire in the attic in 1979. According to English Heritage, a Grade II listing denotes "buildings that are of special interest, warranting every effort to preserve them."

=== Restoration ===
The house closed as a hostel in 2007, after the London Borough of Hillingdon chose to replace its temporary accommodation with affordable permanent housing, in light of a directive from the Government for all local authorities to reduce the number of families in temporary housing by half by 2010. Highgrove, together with six other buildings was put forward to be sold for redevelopment, with the proceeds to be invested in the construction of new housing.

Permission was granted for the restoration of the house and its conversion into a 12 unit luxury housing block in January 2007. Part of the conversion work by the new owners, Westcombe Estates, involved the demolition of an annex building to make way for a sheltered housing block. At that time, the total land around and including the house included with the sale was 0.74 hectares (1.8 acres). In February 2010, the planning permission for the work was extended for a further three years.

In June 2010, an arson attack damaged sections of the ground floor and first floor. Two people were arrested the following day and released on bail in relation to the attack.

The construction of mews houses behind Highgrove House as part of the development was halted in July 2011 after it was found they were being built 1.5 metres (4 ft 11 in) out of the positions set in the planning permission. Following a review, the council agreed to allow the developers to continue the work, despite the close proximity to several existing houses bordering the site.
