= Northwood, London =

Area in the London Borough of Hillingdon and the county of Hertfordshire

Coordinates: 51.601°N 0.4176°W

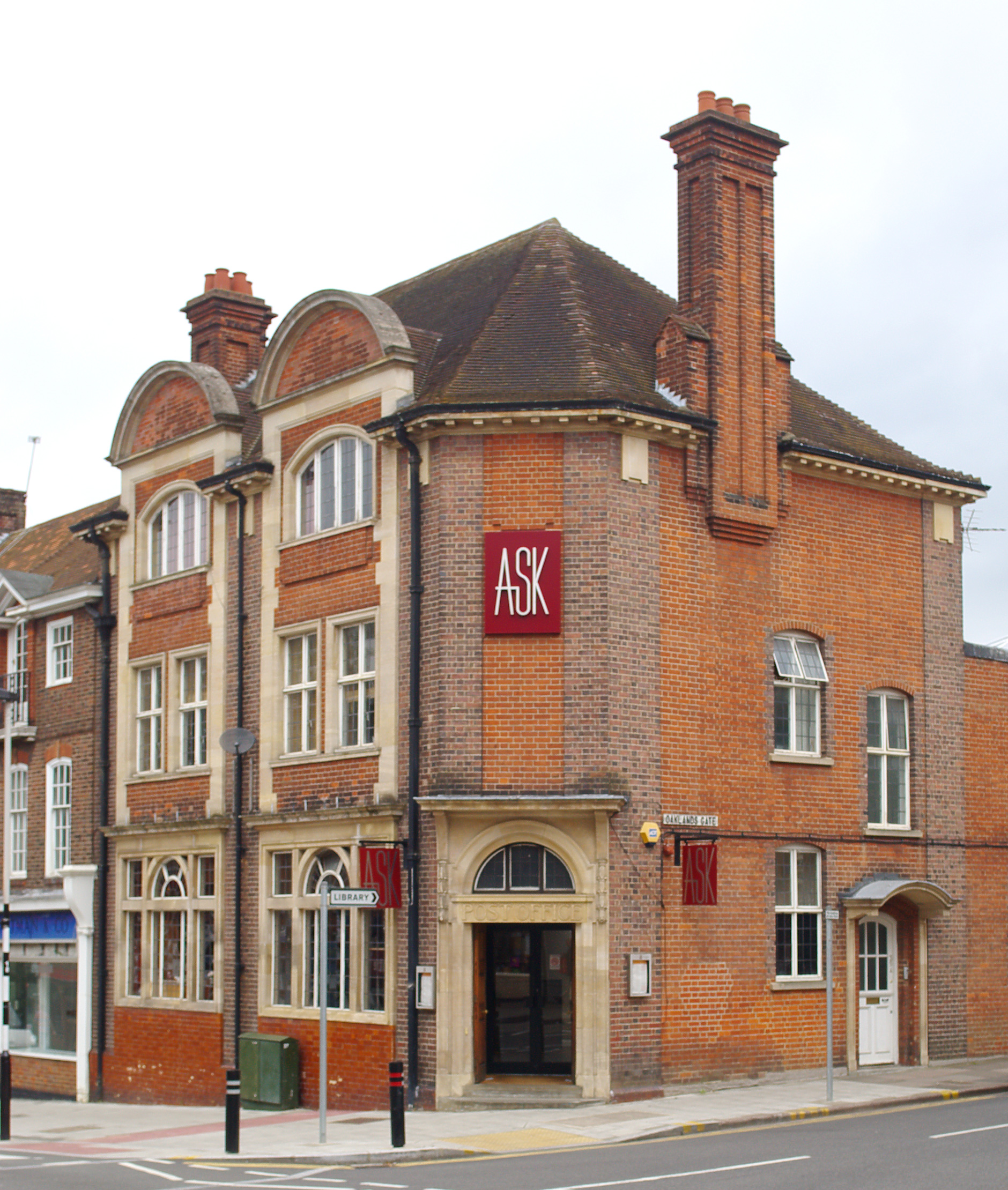
- Former Central Post Office, today a restaurant

- Location within Greater London
- Population: 22,047 (2011 Census
- OS grid reference: TQ095915
  - Charing Cross: 11.5 mi (18.5 km) SE
- London borough: Hillingdon
- Ceremonial county: Greater London
- Region: London
- Country: England
- Sovereign state: United Kingdom
- Post town: NORTHWOOD
- Postcode district: HA6
- Dialling code: 020, 01923
- Police: Metropolitan
- Fire: London
- Ambulance: London
- UK Parliament: Ruislip, Northwood and Pinner
- London Assembly: Ealing and Hillingdon

Northwood is a town located in the London Borough of Hillingdon, located 14.5 miles (23 kilometres) northwest of Charing Cross. It is formerly part of the ancient parish of Ruislip, Middlesex, until 1st April 1965, and shares post towns with parts of Hertfordshire. It has also been within the Metropolitan Police District since 1840. The Northwood Headquarters, despite being named after the area, is located in the bordering area of Eastbury in Hertfordshire.

The area consists of the elevated settlement of Northwood and Northwood Hills, both of which are served by stations on the Metropolitan line of the London Underground. At the 2011 census, the population of Northwood was 10,949, down from 11,068 in 2008, while the population of Northwood Hills was 11,578, up from 10,833 in 2001.

Northwood adjoins Ruislip Woods National Nature Reserve. The area was used for location filming of the Goods' and Leadbetters' houses and surrounding streets in the BBC TV sitcom The Good Life, standing in for Surbiton.

== History ==
=== Toponymy ===
Northwood was first recorded in 1435 as Northwode, formed from the Old English 'north' and 'wode', meaning 'the northern wood', in relation to Ruislip and Ruislip woods.

=== Early developments ===
In the Domesday Book of 1086, the Northwood-embracing parish of Ruislip had immense woodland, sufficient to support one parish with 1,500 pigs per year, and a park for wild beasts (parcus ferarum).

The hamlet of Northwood grew up along the north side of the Rickmansworth-Pinner road which passes across the north-east of the parish. Apart from this road and internal networks in areas of scattered settlement to the east and west, Ruislip had only three ancient roads of any importance of which Ducks Hill Road was the only one in the Northwood hamlet. This followed the course of the modern road from its junction with the Rickmansworth road in the northwest corner of the parish. It then ran south through Ruislip village as Bury Street and continued through the open fields as Down Barns Road (now West End Road) to West End in Northolt.

Northwood had a manorial grange in 1248, which may have occupied the site of the later Northwood Grange. The monks of the Bec Abbey who lived at Manor Farm in Ruislip in the 11th century owned this grange. A few cottages at Northwood are mentioned in the 1565 manorial survey. Two hundred years later the shape of the hamlet, composed of a few farms and dwellings scattered along the Rickmansworth road, had altered little except for the addition of Holy Trinity church. Robert Cecil, 1st Earl of Salisbury had 568 acres (230 ha) of Ruislip cleared of forest.

Northwood, however, elevated and separated from the rest of the parish by a belt of woodland, took until the 19th century to form a village — 350 acres (140 ha) in the manor of St. Catherine's were inclosed under the Ruislip Inclosure Act 1769 (9 Geo. 3. c. 67 Pr.) privatizing land which lay west of Ducks Hill Road, including West Wood (now Mad Bess Wood) which was common ground. A further 3,000 acres (1,200 ha) of Ruislip parish were inclosed by the Ruislip Inclosure Act 1804 (44 Geo. 3. c. 45 Pr.). The character of the area in providing for Northwood and Northwood Hills to have the majority of open spaces as opposed to housing land was begun by transfers of open space land to the public as early as 1899. (Note: Nearly 100 acres (40 ha) between Copse and Park woods and the Rickmansworth Road were leased by Kings College to the Northwood Golf Club in 1899. Gravel Pits, an area of 14 acres (5.7 ha) adjoining the golf course to the north-west in the angle of Ducks Hill and Rickmansworth roads, was scheduled by the urban district council in 1905 for preservation as an open space. Between 1905 and 1953 the council acquired a further 660 acres (270 ha) for open spaces, including the area laid down in 1929 as Haste Hill Golf Course (1927), King's College Fields between Park Avenue and the Pinn (1938), Poors Field between Copse Wood and Ruislip Lido (1939), and Breakspear Road (1949). Permanent preservation of the Manor Farm site and Park and Copse woods was assured by their transference to the Middlesex County Council and the urban district council in 1932 and 1936 respectively.) The open nature of the district attracted three hospitals to move or establish in this part of the parish: Mount Vernon Hospital, St. Vincent's Orthopaedic Hospital and Northwood, Pinner and District Hospital. (Note: Or colloquially: Northwood and Pinner Hospital in Pinner Road, Northwood)

=== Urban development ===
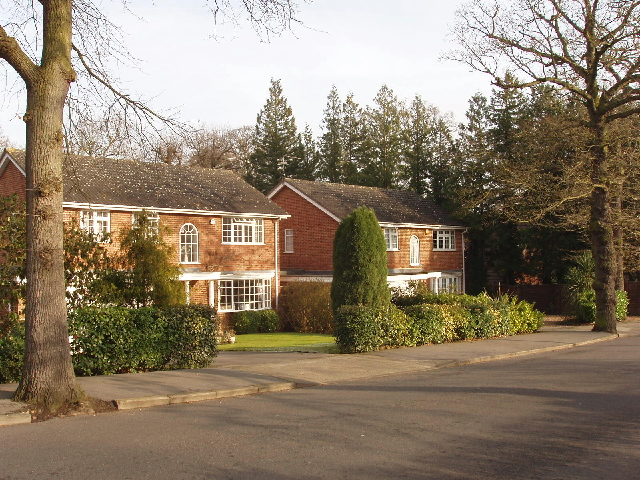
Late 20th-century houses in Northwood

A land survey of Northwood conducted in 1565 by King's College, Cambridge, the new lords of the manor of Ruislip, recorded ten houses and several farms.

By 1881, the population of Northwood had reached 257, with 62 houses recorded from 41 people in 1841. David Carnegie owned the large Eastbury Park Estate in the north of the area in 1881. In 1887, the Metropolitan Railway was extended from Harrow-on-the-Hill to Rickmansworth and Carnegie sold his land to Frank Carew (Note: Frank Murray Maxwell Hallowell Carew) for development for £59,422. Northwood station opened in August that year. Carew stipulated the prices for the new housing he had built, with the cottages along the west side of the High Street priced at £120. He had hoped these would be owned by the staff of the larger houses. The High Street itself had been a track leading on from Rickmansworth Road to Gate Hill Farm. The first shops opened in 1895 on the east side of the road, and included a hairdresser, butchers and a fishmongers. Carew sold the majority of the estate to George Wieland in 1892.

By 1902, the population had reached 2,500 in 500 houses and running 36 shops. In 1904, the Emmanuel Church opened in Northwood Hills, designed by Sir Frank Elgood, a local architect. It had been built in 1895, originally to serve as a school. Elgood later served as chairman of the Ruislip-Northwood Urban District Council.

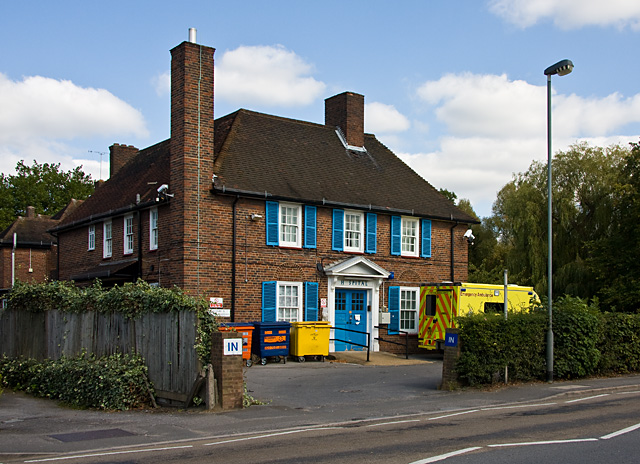
Northwood and Pinner Cottage Hospital, built in 1926

Northwood and Pinner Cottage Hospital was built in 1926 as a memorial to the First World War, using donations from the Ruislip Cottagers' Allotments Charity.

Northwood is home to Northwood Headquarters, in the grounds of Eastbury Park, the estate purchased by David Carnegie in 1857. The Royal Air Force took over the site in 1939 for the use of RAF Coastal Command which made use of Eastbury house and also created a network of underground bunkers and operations blocks, at which time the house was used as the leading Officers' Mess, though was subsequently damaged by fire. The RAF vacated the site in 1969, and it is now the location of the British Armed Forces Permanent Joint Headquarters (PJHQ) for planning and controlling overseas military operations, together with the NATO Maritime Command.

A new community centre on the town's high street, replacing an older building, was officially opened by the local MP Nick Hurd in September 2012. The new building was named the Kate Fassnidge Community Centre after the Uxbridge landowner who donated some of her land to the borough, and replaced a derelict dining club that had originally been a Ritz cinema.

Northwood was listed as the UK’s most expensive place to buy property because of its suburban setting and good transport links to Central London.

== 1948 air disaster ==
On 4 July 1948, a Scandinavian Airlines Douglas DC-6 on a flight from Amsterdam to RAF Northolt collided with an RAF Avro York coming from Malta over Northwood. Both aircraft crashed, killing all 39 people on both aircraft.

== Governance ==
Northwood was part of the ancient parish of Ruislip and became part of the Ruislip-Northwood Urban District in 1904. The urban district was abolished in 1965 and merged with others to become part of the London Borough of Hillingdon in Greater London. Northwood is part of the Northwood ward for elections to Hillingdon London Borough Council.

The Member of Parliament (MP) for the constituency of Ruislip, Northwood and Pinner is currently David Simmonds, who was elected in the December 2019 general election with 55.6% of the vote. The current voting constituency was created from the former Ruislip-Northwood and parts of the Harrow West constituency, for the 6 May 2010 general election.

== Geography ==
The rural nature of Northwood, with extensive views over the rest of the parish, has attracted much expensive building, particularly in and around Copse Wood Way, along Green Lane and at the northern end of Ducks Hill Road.

— A History of Middlesex, 1971

Northwood is in both Hillingdon and Hertfordshire. The town centre is situated in Greater London; however, the northern part of the town is situated in Hertfordshire. A triangular area of Northwood including the old High Street, Chester Road and Hallowell Road is a place of Local Architectural Special Interest, a restriction to protect the ornate Victorian houses made of high-quality brickwork. Dotted across the area are 22 listed buildings (for their architecture).

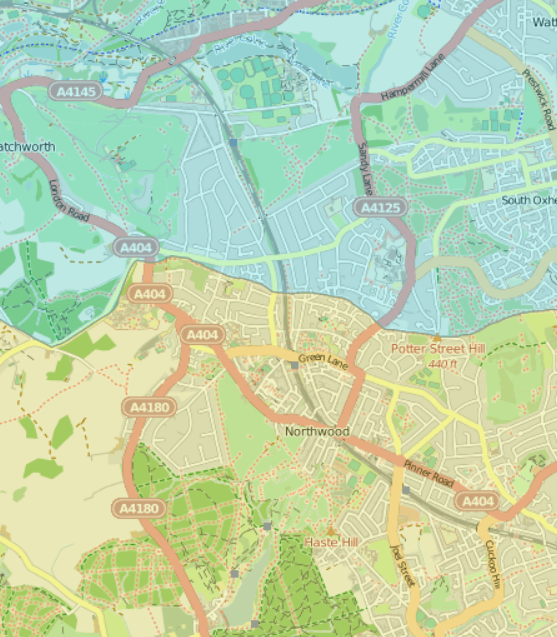
Northwood border of Hillingdon & Hertfordshire

Elevations range between 177 feet (54m) to 374 feet (114m) AOD, with many ridges and folds in the land creating an undulating terrain.

== Climate ==
Climate data for Northwood (1991–2020)
Month	Jan	Feb	Mar	Apr	May	Jun	Jul	Aug	Sep	Oct	Nov	Dec	Year
Record high °C (°F)	15.5 (59.9)	18.6 (65.5)	21.5 (70.7)	26.5 (79.7)	30.1 (86.2)	31.8 (89.2)	34.6 (94.3)	37.0 (98.6)	29.5 (85.1)	28.4 (83.1)	18.1 (64.6)	15.0 (59.0)	37.0 (98.6)
Mean daily maximum °C (°F)	7.8 (46.0)	8.4 (47.1)	11.2 (52.2)	14.3 (57.7)	17.6 (63.7)	20.6 (69.1)	22.9 (73.2)	22.5 (72.5)	19.4 (66.9)	15.0 (59.0)	10.8 (51.4)	8.1 (46.6)	14.9 (58.8)
Daily mean °C (°F)	5.1 (41.2)	5.4 (41.7)	7.4 (45.3)	9.9 (49.8)	12.9 (55.2)	15.9 (60.6)	18.1 (64.6)	17.8 (64.0)	15.1 (59.2)	11.5 (52.7)	7.8 (46.0)	5.4 (41.7)	11.0 (51.8)
Mean daily minimum °C (°F)	2.3 (36.1)	2.3 (36.1)	3.7 (38.7)	5.4 (41.7)	8.3 (46.9)	11.3 (52.3)	13.4 (56.1)	13.1 (55.6)	10.7 (51.3)	7.9 (46.2)	4.9 (40.8)	2.6 (36.7)	7.2 (45.0)
Record low °C (°F)	−6.7 (19.9)	−10.0 (14.0)	−4.8 (23.4)	−3.1 (26.4)	−1.5 (29.3)	4.4 (39.9)	7.9 (46.2)	6.3 (43.3)	2.9 (37.2)	−1.6 (29.1)	−5.7 (21.7)	−9.7 (14.5)	−10.0 (14.0)
Average precipitation mm (inches)	67.5 (2.66)	49.8 (1.96)	43.2 (1.70)	47.1 (1.85)	51.6 (2.03)	50.9 (2.00)	49.6 (1.95)	56.5 (2.22)	53.0 (2.09)	74.1 (2.92)	75.9 (2.99)	67.2 (2.65)	686.3 (27.02)
Average precipitation days (≥ 1.0 mm)	12.0	10.1	9.2	9.3	8.8	8.6	8.4	9.1	8.5	10.6	12.1	11.5	118.1
Mean monthly sunshine hours	52.8	69.5	112.4	164.2	199.5	196.8	208.7	193.1	134.6	109.0	64.8	50.8	1,556.1
Source 1: Met Office
Source 2: Starlings Roost Weather

== Localities ==
=== Northwood Hills ===
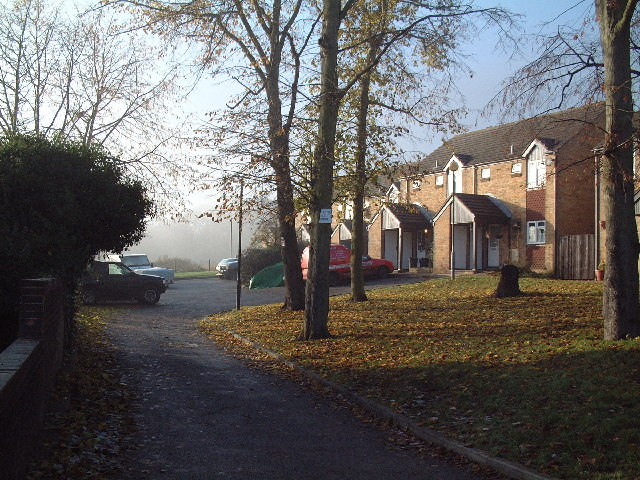
Early 21st-century houses in Northwood Hills

Northwood Hills includes Haste Hill and is separated by green buffers on almost all sides, though touches Eastcote Village to the south and had a population of 11,441 in 2008 according to the Office for National Statistics.

The land on which Northwood Hills, Haste Hill Golf Club and most of Northwood now stand was once the Great Common Wood. This covered 860 acres (350 ha) in the 16th century, which residents would use for grazing their livestock and collecting firewood. Robert Cecil, 1st Earl of Salisbury achieved inclosure from Parliament and sold 568 acres (230 ha) of the wood in 1608 for £4000. The remaining woodland became Copse Wood, part of the Ruislip Woods, a national nature reserve.

Northwood Hills has intermixed in its area the only social housing estates beyond one street of the area; much of its private housing stock was built during the 1930s by the Belton Estates company, led by Harry Peachey, while Harry Neal was responsible for building the shopping parade in Joel Street. Its name was chosen in a competition by a woman from North Harrow, as the land was split between Northwood, North Harrow and Ruislip parishes. The first houses were built in Potter Street.

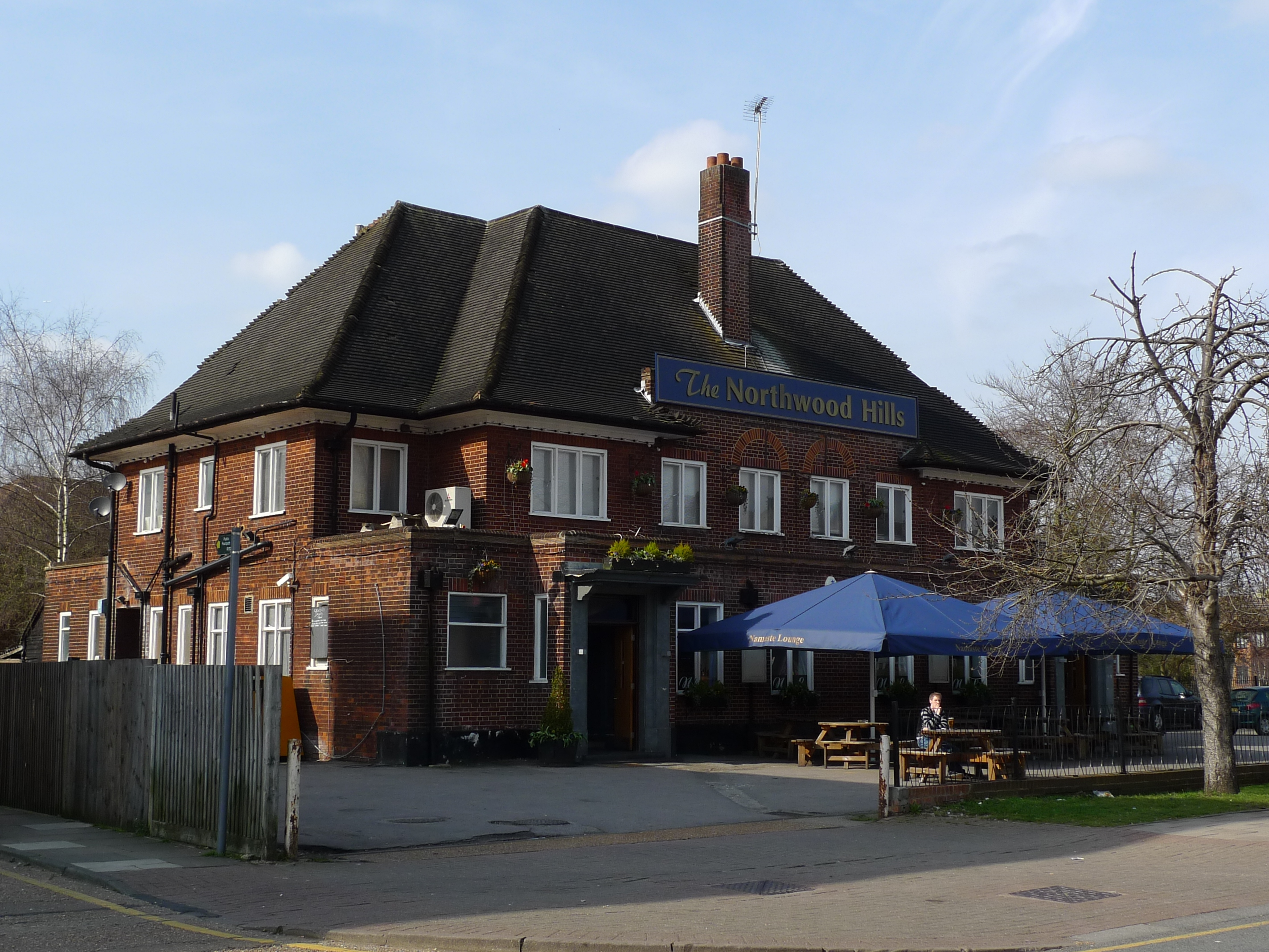
The Northwood Hills public house

The Namaste Lounge Restaurant opposite the tube station was formerly the Northwood Hills public house, known previously as the Northwood Hills Hotel. It is cited as the venue where Elton John first performed professionally. A picture of the pub appears on one of his album covers.

Northwood secondary school and sixth form is located in Potter Street (the former name of the school). The Olympic boxer Audley Harrison and Big Brother contestant Nikki Grahame are alumni of the school.

== Landmarks ==
Northwood Grange incorporates a 15th-century block with a crown-post roof, a cross-wing of the same date, and a long range of about 1600. This is now the Hall School, Northwood.

Denville Hall, formerly Northwood Hall, this has since 1925 been a retirement home for actors, actresses and members of other theatrical professions.

The London School of Theology is an English interdenominational evangelical theological college.

== Transport ==
London Underground stations on the Metropolitan line that serve the area are Northwood and Northwood Hills.

The area is also served by Transport for London contracted bus routes 282, 331 and H11, connecting the area to Ruislip, Harrow, Northolt, Denham, Greenford, Uxbridge and Ealing Hospital.

The area is also served by Red Rose Travel routes 328, 346 connecting the area to Watford via South Oxhey and Carpenders Park, and by Red Eagle Buses, which terminate at Mount Vernon Hospital with the R1 to Maple Cross and the R2 to Chorleywood – through Harefield and Rickmansworth.

== Education ==
See the List of schools in Hillingdon.

== Culture and community ==
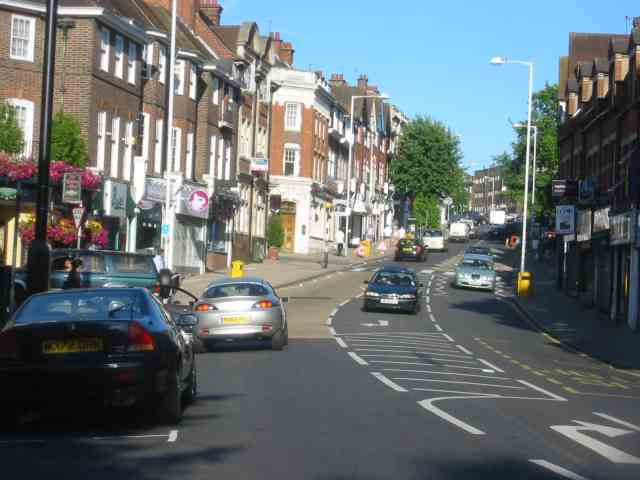
Green Lane, Northwood town centre

A local residents' association and chamber of commerce joined forces in May 2010 calling for greater recognition of the area. In May 2011, the London Borough of Hillingdon announced Northwood Hills would receive £400,000 in funding for regeneration work.

== Sport ==
The area is home to Northwood F.C. who play at Chestnut Avenue and play in the Isthmian League South Central Division as of the 2018/2019 season, Northwood Town Cricket Club also play at the same location in the Hertfordshire Cricket League. Northwood Cricket Club play at their Ducks Hill Road ground and are a club in the Saracens Hertfordshire Premier League.

== Notable people ==
- Dame Joan Plowright (1929–2025) lived in Northwood at the time of her death.
- Author Julian Barnes grew up in Northwood.
- Double agent George Blake (1922–2020) lived in Northwood after escaping from Nazi-occupied Netherlands.
- Actress Kathleen Byron (1921–2009) lived in Northwood at the time of her death.
- Television and radio presenter Fearne Cotton was born in Northwood and attended Haydon School, Northwood Hills.
- Sir William Dickson (1898–1987), former head of the British armed forces, was born in Northwood.
- Former actress Helen Grace grew up in Northwood.
- Former Big Brother contestant Nikki Grahame (1982–2021) was born and raised in Northwood.
- Scientist Louis Harold Gray (1905–1965) worked at the Mount Vernon Hospital and died in Northwood in 1965.
- Artist Roger Hilton (1911–1975), post-war pioneer of abstract art, was born in Northwood.
- Film director Derek Jarman (1942–1994), whose credits include Jubilee and The Tempest (1979), was born in Northwood.
- George W. Jones, printer and type designer, buried at Holy Trinity Church.
- Actor Geoffrey Keen (1916–2005) lived in Northwood at the time of his death.
- Actress Betty Marsden (1919–1998) lived in Northwood at the time of her death.
- Actor David Quilter was born in Northwood.
- Actor Arnold Ridley (1896–1984), best known as Private Charles Godfrey in BBC sitcom Dad's Army, lived in Northwood.
- Actress Patsy Smart (1918–1996) lived in Northwood at the time of her death.
- Character actor Geoffrey Toone (1910–2005) lived in Northwood at the time of his death.
- The singer Elena Tonra grew up in Northwood.
- Theatre director and co-artistic director of performance company Clod Ensemble, Suzy Willson, was born in Northwood.
- Actress Jessie Matthews (1907–1981) lived in Northwood in the 1960s.
