= Eastcote House Gardens =

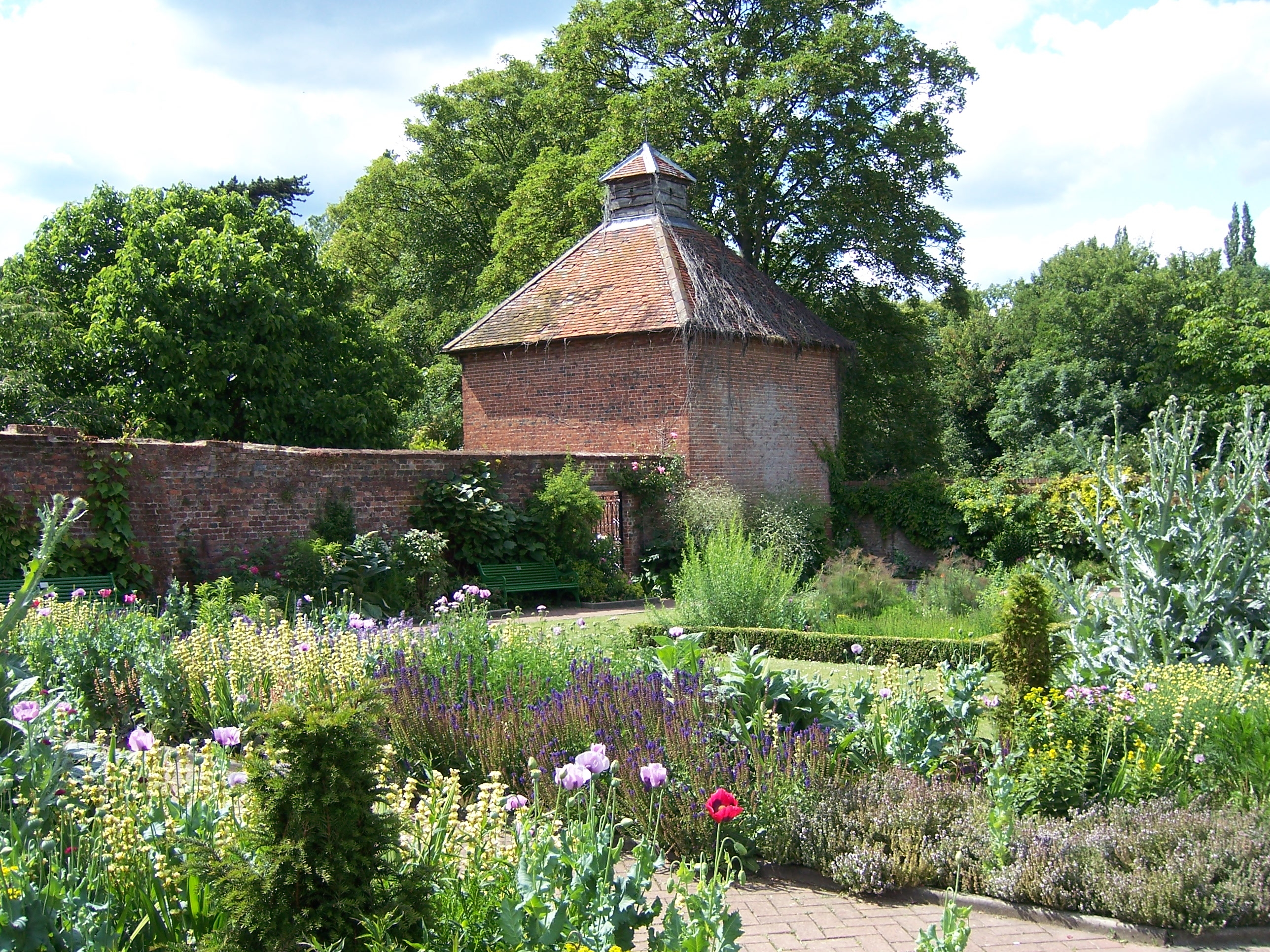
- The dovecote and herb beds

- Location within Greater London

General information
- Location: Eastcote, Greater London, England
- Coordinates: 51.586667°N 0.402222°W

Eastcote House Gardens is an area of public parkland in Eastcote, within the London Borough of Hillingdon. The site covers 3.63 hectares (9 acres) and incorporates the walled garden, dovecote and coach house of Eastcote House. The house was demolished in 1964 by the then Ruislip-Northwood Urban District Council (RNUDC), one of the predecessors of the London Borough of Hillingdon which was formed the following year. At the public's request, the garden and outbuildings were retained and are now maintained by a group of volunteers, the Friends of Eastcote House Gardens, in partnership with the local authority.

Eastcote House was one of three largest in Eastcote, together with Highgrove House and Haydon Hall. All came to be owned by the RNUDC, but only Highgrove House remains in its original form; Haydon Hall was demolished in 1967 by the RNUDC's successor.

The coach house, dovecote, and garden walls received Grade II listed status on 6 September 1974. Ecological surveys have found fifty types of trees in the gardens, and numerous species of birds, mammals and insects have been recorded. The gardens received the Green Flag Award in September 2011 following an earlier inspection.

== History ==
=== Eastcote House ===
Eastcote House was the home of the Hawtrey family

Eastcote House is first recorded in 1507, when it was known as "Hopkyttes", under the ownership of the Walleston family. In 1525, Ralph Hawtrey married Winifred Walleston, and they made Hopkyttes their marital home, renaming it Eastcote House. The house was extended by either Ralph Hawtrey or his son John, and the brick exterior added. The original timber framework was not revealed again until the house was demolished. John Hawtrey built the dovecote without applying for the required licence. After his death in 1593, his nephew Ralph Hawtrey applied retrospectively, and the licence was granted. During the 18th century, the dovecote was substantially rebuilt, leaving only the original first few rows of bricks. The Hawtrey family, later the Hawtrey-Deanes, continued to live in the house until Francis Deane moved to East View in Uxbridge in 1878. Eastcote House was then let to tenants and parts of the estate sold for housing developments.

The Ruislip-Northwood Urban District Council purchased the house and grounds, totalling 9.1 acres (3.7 ha), in 1931 after it became endangered by the proposed new housing development by the builders Comben & Wakeling. Eastcote House became a public building for the use of the Scouts, Guides, Women's Institute and a welfare clinic, though under the ownership of the council, the condition of the house deteriorated. In 1962 the house was declared unsafe, and it was demolished two years later after the council ruled there were no features of the house worth retaining.

The Eastcote Billiards Club began using the coach house in 1938. The club's lease of the building expired in 2005, but the club remained in residence, rent-free. In 2013, the club had moved to nearby Haydon Hall.

=== Gardens ===
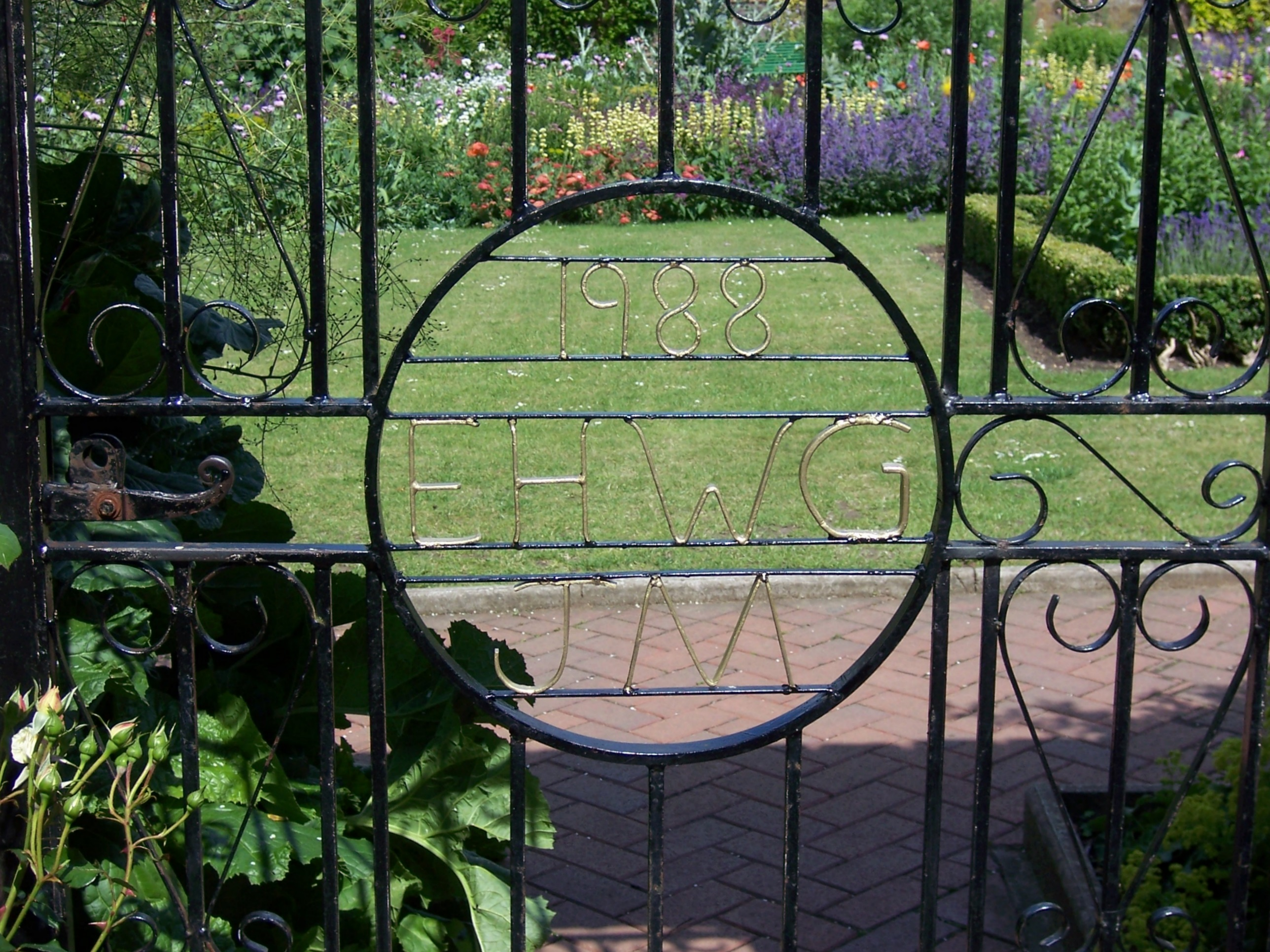
Detail of the entrance gate to the walled garden

The narrow bricks in the garden walls have been dated to around the 17th century. The walled garden would originally have been used predominantly for growing fruit, vegetables, and herbs for the household's consumption, as well as flowers to exhibit at shows and for pleasure.

The walled garden, coach house, and dovecote were retained at the public's request when the house was demolished. On 6 September 1974, the garden walls and remaining buildings were awarded Grade II listed status. The herb garden was planted across the four centre beds in 1977 to celebrate the Silver Jubilee of Elizabeth II. These included Artemisia, catmint, Santolina and curry plants. To keep the plants within the beds, each was lined by box in 1983.

The eastern wall was rebuilt in 1981, at which point the northern wall was reduced by seven layers of brick. An area of topiary with seven specimens was planted in 1983 with box, behind the coach house. Lilacs, weeping cherries and hibiscus were planted in 1984 along the garden wall near the coach house. A pergola covered with laburnum and wisteria was introduced in 1986 leading to the entrance into the walled garden. Between 1986 and 1988, two iron gates and a sundial were added. In the 1990s, the orchard near the walled garden was supplemented by black mulberry, walnut and quince trees.

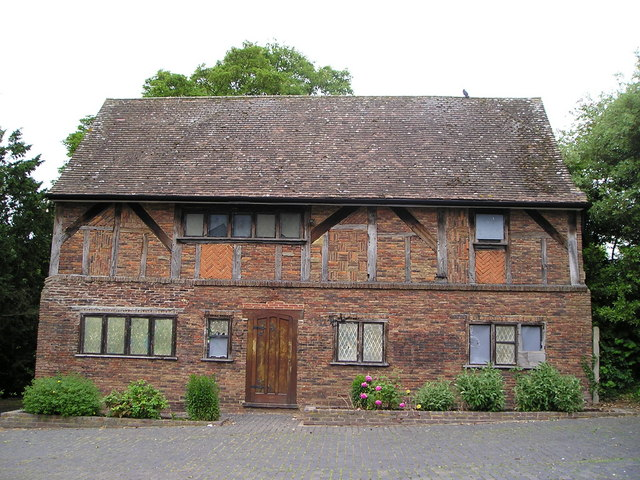
The coach house, before restoration

A footbridge crossing the River Pinn and leading to Long Meadow was replaced in 2007; the original had been built in 1977. In 2008, the Friends of Eastcote House Gardens was formed to care for the gardens and ensure they remain protected. The group received a £24,000 grant from the Big Lottery Fund for the replanting of the gardens, which went ahead in April 2010. The Mayor of Hillingdon officially reopened the gardens on 17 July 2010.

A survey completed in November 2009 found 50 types of trees in the gardens. Bats were found in the coach house during an ecological survey, but were not believed to be roosting there long-term. Species of birds observed in the gardens have included song thrush, jay, wren, robin, kingfisher and tawny owl. Mammals regularly observed include hedgehogs, grey squirrels and foxes. Butterflies including the holly blue and painted lady have been recorded.

Hillingdon Council provided a £150,000 grant in September 2010 towards the restoration of the buildings. In April 2011, the council joined with the Friends of Eastcote House Gardens to seek funding of up to £1million from Heritage Lottery Fund, to support a full restoration project.

The gardens received the Green Flag Award in 2011 following an inspection. The flag was raised in a ceremony on 14 September 2011.

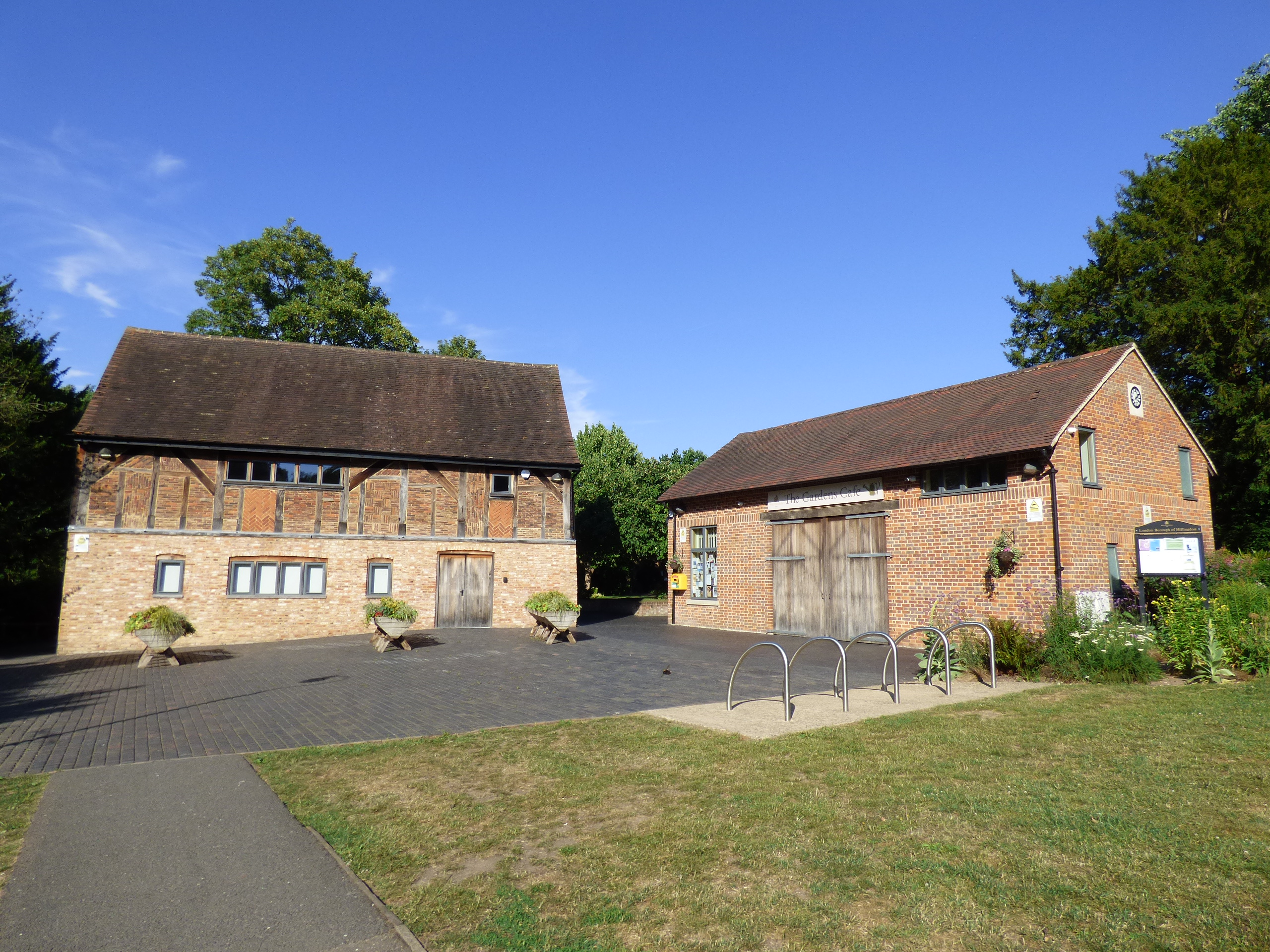
The fully restored Tudor stables

In 2013 Heritage Lottery Fund awarded £1.3m to restore the Tudor stables buildings and also carry out archaeological work which uncovered the footprint of Eastcote House, as well as the pillars of its porch, now returned to their original position. The work was completed by 2017, with the stables now open regularly to the public as The Gardens Café.

In 2016 the Friends of Eastcote House Gardens were rewarded for their efforts improving the park when they were given The Queen's Golden Jubilee Award for Voluntary Service.

In May 2024 the walled garden was officially renamed as The Lesley Crowcroft Walled Garden, in honour of the former chair of the Friends of Eastcote House Gardens. Lesley worked tirelessly to improve the garden and to secure the Heritage Lottery Fund money which paid for the restoration of the Tudor buildings. Lesley died in October 2023.
