= Eastcote =

Area of west London, England

Coordinates: 51.5842°N 0.3897°W

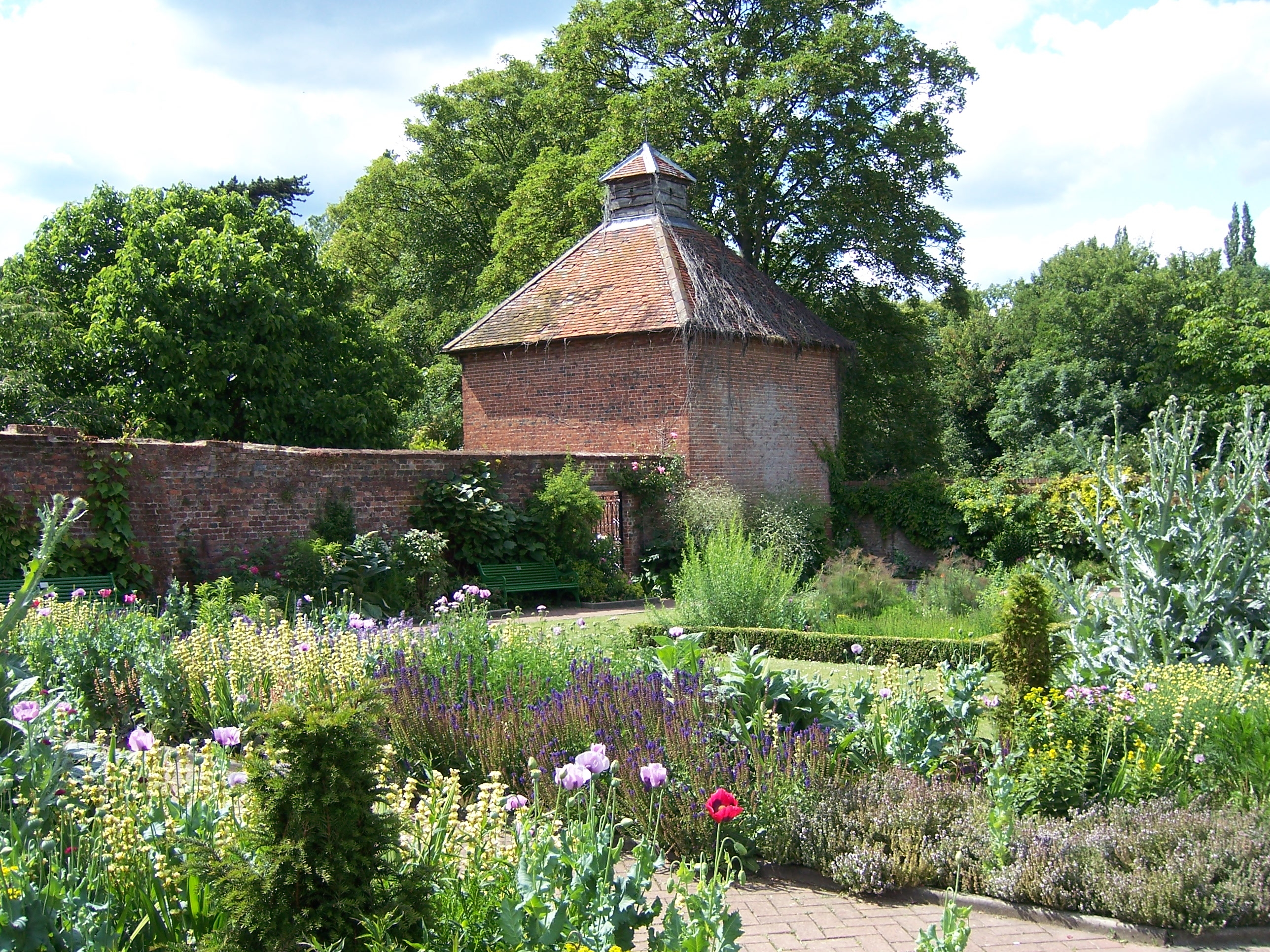
- The dovecote in Eastcote House Gardens

- Location within Greater London
- Population: 12,142 (Eastcote and East Ruislip ward, 2011)
- OS grid reference: TQ115885
- London borough: Hillingdon
- Ceremonial county: Greater London
- Region: London
- Country: England
- Sovereign state: United Kingdom
- Post town: RUISLIP
- Postcode district: HA4
- Post town: PINNER
- Postcode district: HA5
- Dialling code: 020
- Police: Metropolitan
- Fire: London
- Ambulance: London
- UK Parliament: Ruislip, Northwood and Pinner
- London Assembly: Ealing and Hillingdon

Eastcote is a suburban area in the London Borough of Hillingdon, in West London.

In the Middle Ages, Eastcote was one of the three areas that made up the parish of Ruislip, under the name of Ascot. The name came from its position to the east of the parish.

Eastcote housed an outstation of the Bletchley Park codebreaking activities during the Second World War, with several codebreaking computers in use. This operation became the precursor to GCHQ, which remained in Eastcote after the war until the department moved to purpose-built buildings in Cheltenham in 1952.

Lady Mary Bankes lived in Eastcote for a time, and led the defence of Corfe Castle in Dorset against the Roundheads during the English Civil War.

By the turn of the 20th century, the recorded population was around 600; this had reached 12,142 for the Eastcote and East Ruislip ward in 2007.

Part of Eastcote is in the Pinner postal district, despite being in Hillingdon rather than Harrow.

== History ==
=== Toponymy ===
Eastcote was originally recorded as Ascot, one of the three medieval tithings ^{[a]} of the parish of Ruislip, along with Westcot and Norwood. Norwood, in the north of the parish, became Northwood; Westcot, in the west became Westcote (the main Ruislip village), and Ascot, in the east, became what is now Eastcote.

=== Early developments ===
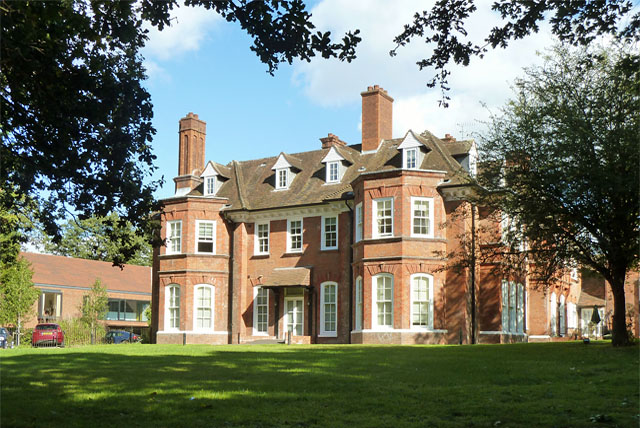
Highgrove House was built in the 18th century.

The Hawtrey family moved to Eastcote around 1525 after Ralph Hawtrey married Winifred Walleston. She lived in a cottage named "Hopkyttes", which the couple moved into and renamed Eastcote House. A dovecote was built by their son John, without applying for a licence from the manor, as was the custom at the time. After his death in 1593, his nephew Ralph Hawtrey applied for the licence, which was approved.

Ralph Hawtrey's only daughter became Lady Mary Bankes when she married Sir John Bankes, Chief Justice to Charles I. As a Royalist, she defended their home in Dorset, Corfe Castle, against the Roundheads in 1643 at the time of the English Civil War. A plaque on the south wall of St Martin's Church in Ruislip commemorates her heroic act. Lady Bankes had also lived at Haydon Hall in Eastcote, and her name is remembered by the school in Northwood Hills.

In 1565, a land survey was completed which recorded 62 houses in Eastcote, of which four were ruined.

The first Haydon Hall was built in 1630 for Lady Alice, the Dowager Countess of Derby, predominantly to allow her to store her possessions there. Lady Alice lived at Harefield Place, and purchased the land on which the hall was built from the Haydon family. The family appear in parish records from 1394 until 1562 when they sold a house on the site of Haydon Hall to William Nicholas.

Highgrove House was built in the 18th century but was destroyed by fire and rebuilt in 1879. Winston Churchill stayed there during his honeymoon and the Queen of Sweden was resident during the First World War.

=== Urban development ===
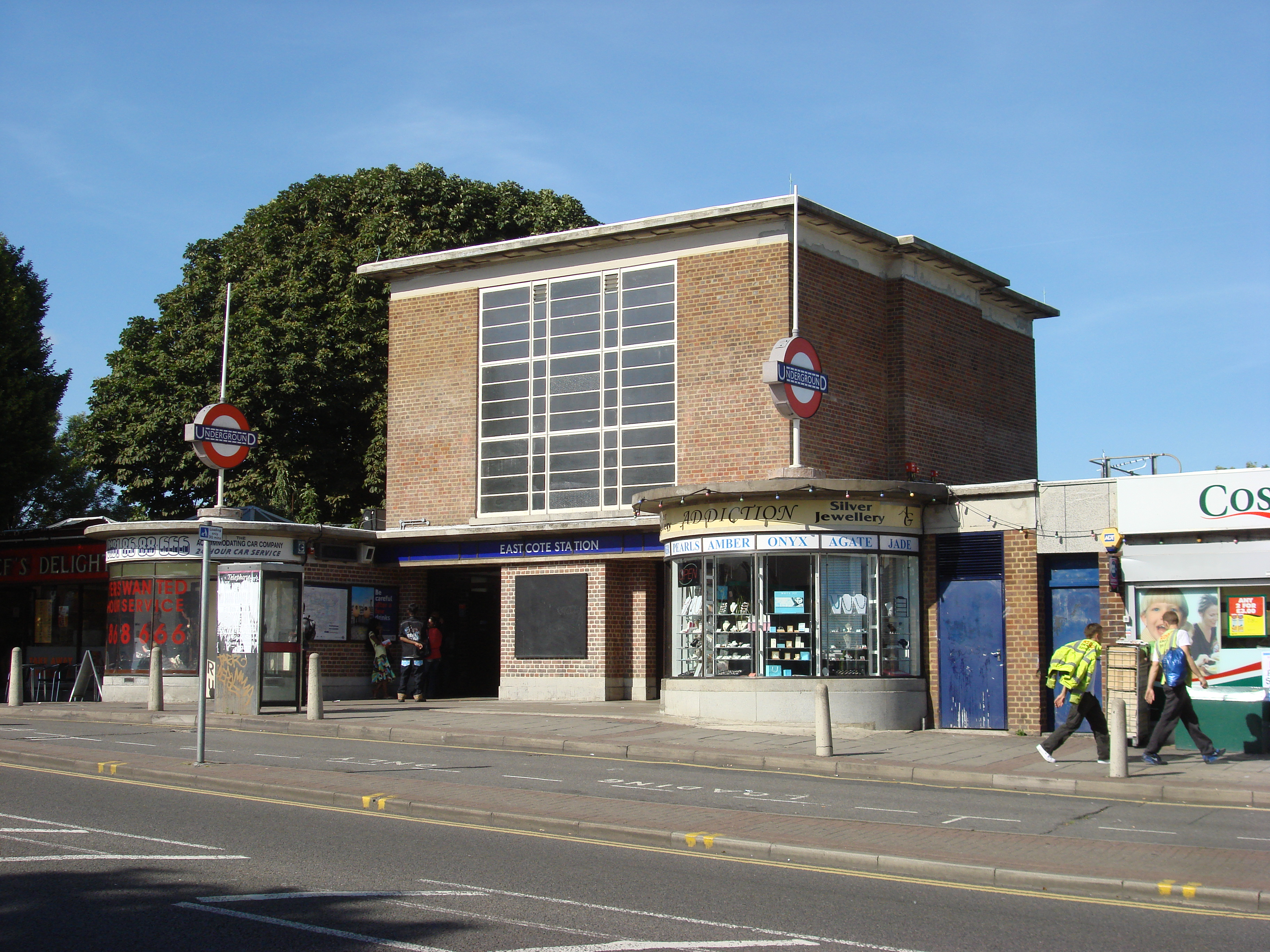
Eastcote tube station was originally built as a halt in 1906

At the turn of the 20th century, Eastcote was a small community with around 120 cottages and a population of around 600 people.

The Metropolitan Railway was extended to Uxbridge from Harrow on the Hill in 1904, passing through Eastcote. A halt was built in 1906. The extension of the railway brought with it a substantial number of travellers seeking a day out in the countryside. The tea garden of the Old Barn House became popular with visitors to the area, as were cottages including The Rosery and Orchard Farm which served refreshments. In 1914, the Cavendish Pavilion was built as a private sports ground. The railway halt was rebuilt as a station in 1939.

In 1930, the housing developers Comben & Wakeling purchased the Hawtrey family's land, which included Eastcote House and its grounds, with the plan for the new Eastcote Park Estate. The estate - comprising Pamela Gardens, St Lawrence Drive, Rodney Gardens, Burwood Avenue and The Glen - would have necessitated the demolition of Eastcote House until this was purchased by the Ruislip-Northwood Urban District Council in 1937 for public use. Haydon Hall was purchased by the local council in 1936 after the death of its owner, Mrs Bennett-Edwards.

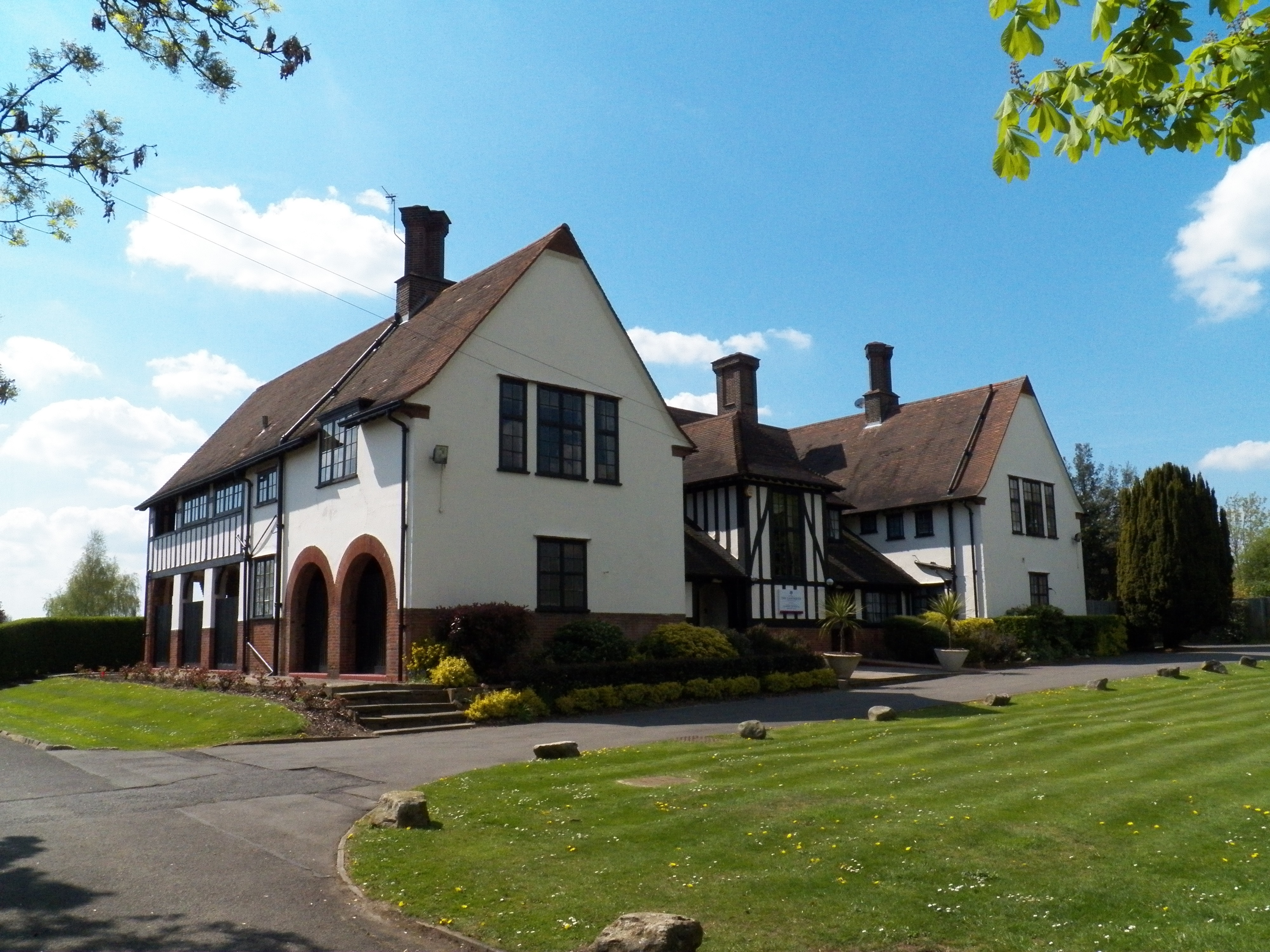
The Cavendish Pavilion opened as a private sports ground in 1914.

During the Second World War, Eastcote House was used to house the local branch of the Food Control Office, in charge of issuing ration books. The area was subjected to bombing by the Luftwaffe; 106 bombs fell on Eastcote between September 1940 and May 1941, from a total of 18 recorded raids.

The British government built a military hospital on land near Highgrove House during the war, in preparation for military casualties from the D-Day landings. They were not required for the role and were converted into barracks for Navy Wrens. An outpost to Bletchley Park was also established surplus buildings on the site, which became known to staff as HMS Pembroke V. A total of 100 Bombe codebreaker machines were used to decode German Enigma messages. The station closed shortly after the war ended in 1945, although the operations from Bletchley Park were re-established on the site in April 1946, under the new name of "Government Communications Headquarters" (GCHQ). Operations continued on the site, including the use of two Colossus codebreaking machines, until GCHQ moved to a new purpose-built site in Cheltenham in February 1954.

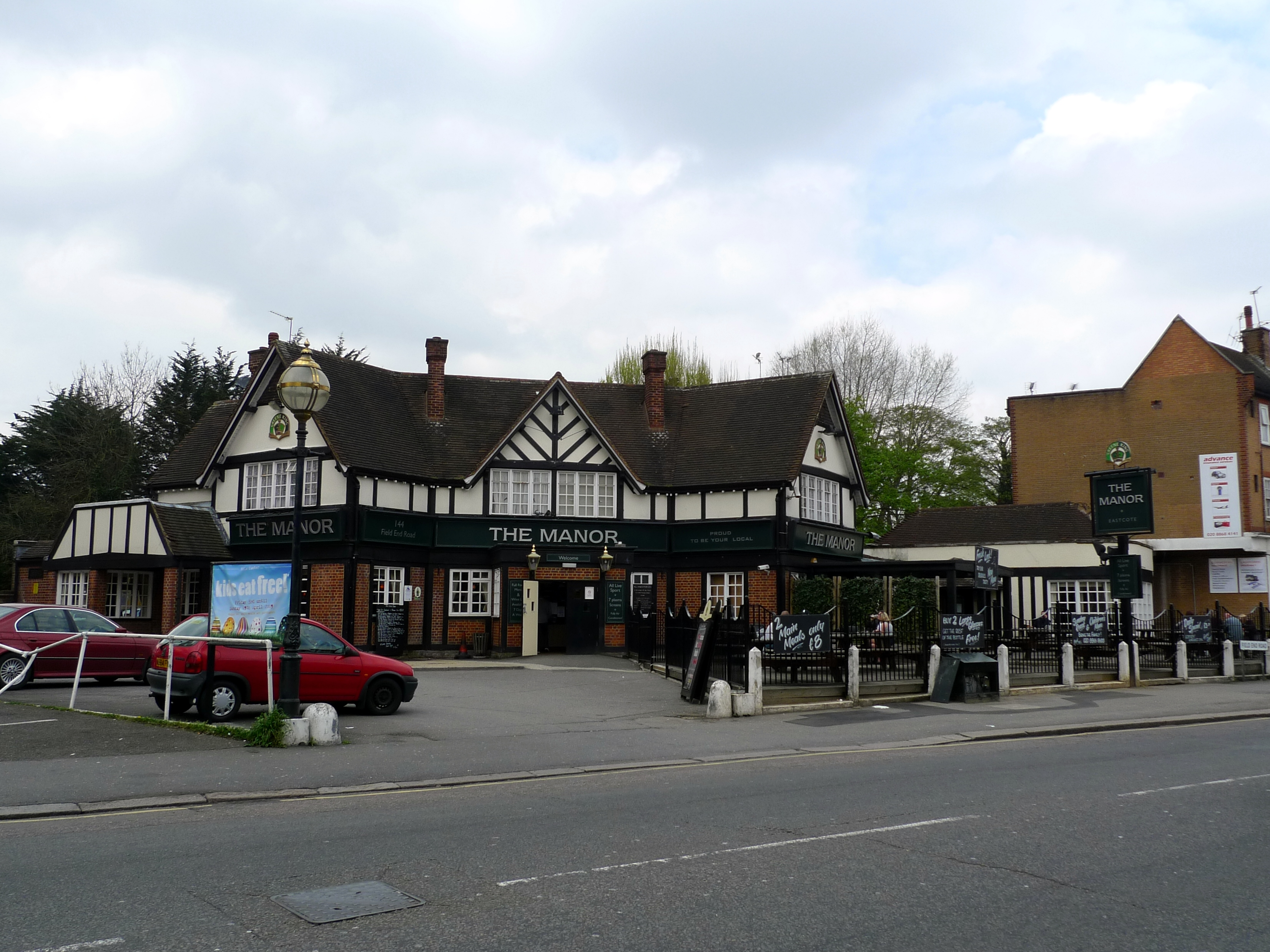
The Manor public house, pictured in 2009, was refurbished and renamed The Ascott in 2011.

In 1952, a number of new houses were built by Wimpeys Ltd in Newnham Avenue for the Ruislip-Northwood Urban District Council as part of their "no fines" scheme. The Minister for Housing and later Prime Minister, Harold Macmillan, attended.

In 1964, Eastcote House was demolished after it was declared structurally unsafe. The grounds including the walled garden, coach house and dovecote were retained for public use. Haydon Hall had also fallen into a state of disrepair and was demolished in 1967.

The RAF Eastcote site was sold for development to George Wimpey (later Taylor Wimpey) in 2007, with plans for the construction of 385 new homes. As of early 2011, 50% of the development had been completed, and the estate renamed Pembroke Park, in reference to HMS Pembroke V, the former name of the codebreaking operation during the Second World War.

In November 2011 the public house The Manor was refurbished and renamed "The Ascott", after the owners Greene King Brewery asked for public suggestions for a new name based on the local history of the area. The Case is Altered pub in Eastcote High Road is Grade II listed.

== Local government ==
Eastcote was in the Ruislip-Northwood constituency until boundary changes at the 2010 general election split the seat into two constituencies, with most of the area becoming part of the Ruislip, Northwood and Pinner constituency, served by Conservative MP Nick Hurd who was first elected in 2005. The constituency is now served by David Simmonds. The remaining parts of the town, areas to the south of the North View/Village Way/Field End Road intersection are in the Uxbridge and South Ruislip constituency, currently served by Danny Beales (Labour).

The Eastcote ward elects three councillors to Hillingdon London Borough Council.

Eastcote (2022)
Party	Candidate	Votes	%	±%
Conservative	Nick Denys	3,396	65.4	
Conservative	Becky Haggar	3,272	63.1	
Conservative	Ian Kevin Edwards	3,227	62.2	
Labour	David Michael Ernest Keys	1,256	24.2	
Labour	Robert Mark Cowlin	1,201	23.1	
Labour	Joanne Charlotte Tapper	1,190	22.9	
Green	Rachel Elizabeth Ross	611	11.8	
Liberal Democrats	Tom Cottew	542	10.4	
Green	Andrew George Kennedy	495	9.5	
Green	David William Stephens	304	5.9	
TUSC	Tim Henry	72	1.4	
Turnout		5,189	42.1	
Conservative win (new seat)				
Conservative win (new seat)				
Conservative win (new seat)				

== Localities ==
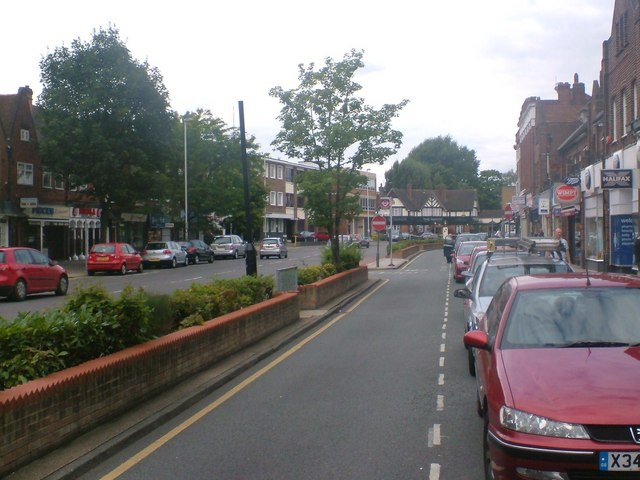
Field End Road in Eastcote

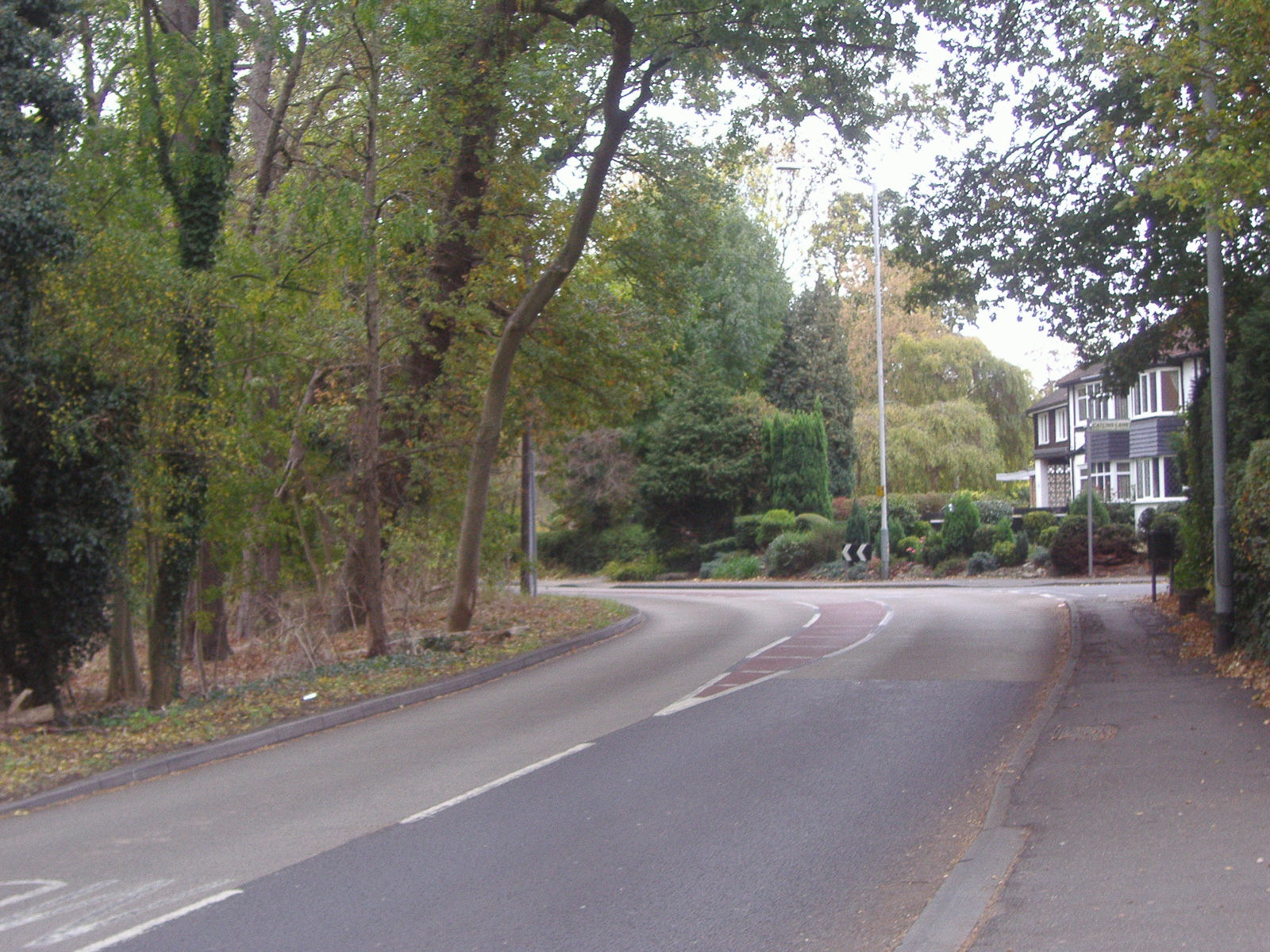
Eastcote High Road in Eastcote Village

Eastcote Village is the only named locality on Ordnance Survey maps, on slopes with elevations of 40–55m AOD above the rest of Eastcote and extends towards Ruislip Woods National Nature Reserve and Haste Hill. Eastcote Village surrounds a park-based conservation area that includes the cricket pitch, Eastcote House Gardens and Haydon Hall Park on the upper slopes of the River Pinn. An adjoining conservation area, Eastcote Park, includes some of the south of Eastcote Village.

== Demography ==
The local electoral ward is called Eastcote. The population as of 2015 was 12,600, of which 20.2% were of minority ethnicity. The median age as of 2013 was 44 years. 83.8% of houses are owned.

== Economy ==
When Ferrero International set up a UK subsidiary in April 1966, it was set up at Television House at 269 Field End Road, south of the tube station. Originating in Alba, Piedmont, it was Italy's largest confectionery company; with factories also in France and Germany it was responsible for the Tic Tac mints.

== Transport ==
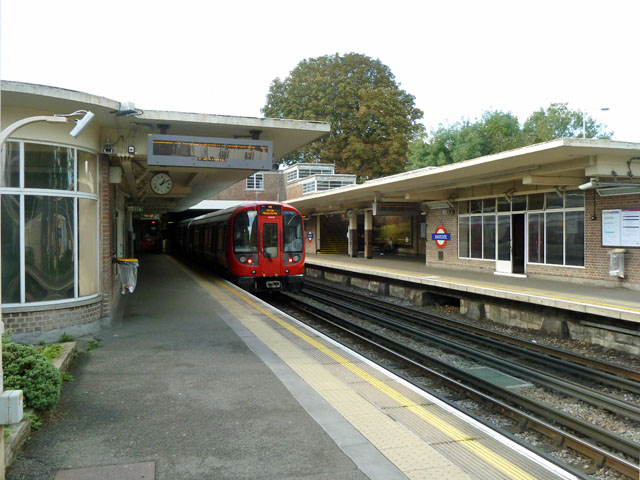
A Metropolitan line train departs Eastcote tube station

Eastcote Underground station is served by the Metropolitan and Piccadilly lines.

Eastcote is served by three bus routes, though only two serve Eastcote itself. The London Bus routes 282 to Ealing Hospital (via Northolt) and Mount Vernon Hospital in Northwood, and 398 to Northolt's Wood End Estate (via Rayners Lane) and Ruislip serve Eastcote. Route H13 to Ruislip Lido and Northwood Hills (via Pinner) does not serve Eastcote shopping parade itself, but does pass through the "traditional" Eastcote Village along High Road Eastcote. There is no direct bus link to Harrow, despite the H-prefix in H13.

== Notable people ==
- Hungarian-born artist Ervin Bossányi (1891-1975) lived in Eastcote at the time of his death.
- Actress Jessie Matthews (1907-1981) died in Eastcote.
- Composer Sir Michael Tippett (1905-1998) was born in Eastcote.
- Actress Luisa Bradshaw-White, best known for her roles in EastEnders, Holby City and This Life, was born in Eastcote.
- Television and radio presenter Fearne Cotton grew up in Eastcote.
- Actor Bernard Holley, known for roles in Doctor Who and EastEnders among others, was born in Eastcote.
- Singer Siobhán Donaghy of the Sugababes was born in Eastcote.
