= Northwood and Pinner Cottage Hospital =

Coordinates: 51.6039°N 0.4138°W

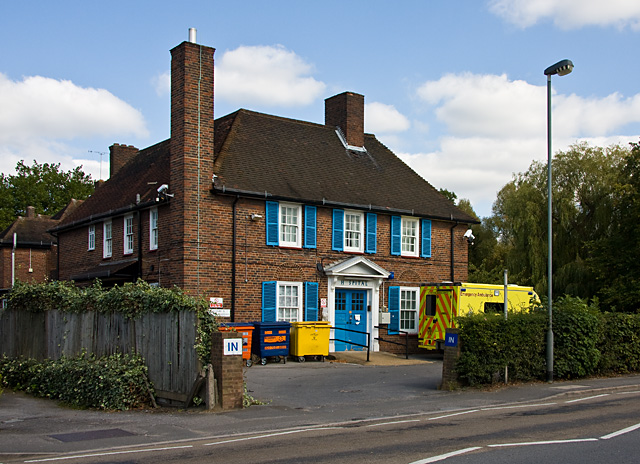
- Northwood and Pinner Cottage Hospital

- Location within Hillingdon

Geography
- Location: Northwood, London, England, United Kingdom

Organisation
- Care system: NHS England

History
- Founded: 1920
- Closed: 2008

Links
- Lists: Hospitals in England

Northwood and Pinner Cottage Hospital was built as a war memorial in Northwood, London.

== History ==
The hospital was created as a memorial to those who had died in the First World War and was opened in a small building at the corner of Green Lane and Hallowell Road by Margaret Lloyd George in 1920. It moved to a purpose-built facility in Pinner Road in December 1924. An extension was opened by the Countess of Harewood in 1930. It joined the National Health Service as the Northwood, Pinner and District Hospital in 1948.

At the end of 1983 it was the site of a workers occupation aiming to keep the hospital open. This was followed by a successful Judicial Review of the decision by Hillingdon District Health Authority to close it

The hospital closed in 2008 after the Hillingdon Primary Care Trust stated it had become too costly to maintain. In 2010 the trust announced the hospital would remain empty for another four years while funding was used to improve services in other areas of the London Borough of Hillingdon. In 2011 the trust said the hospital could remain closed for a further ten years. A potential option of selling the hospital by September 2012 was referred to in the minutes of a budget meeting of NHS Hillingdon.
