= Haydon Hall =

- Haydon Hall

- Location within Greater London

General information
- Architectural style: Classic
- Location: Eastcote, Greater London, England
- Coordinates: 51.588333°N 0.406111°W
- Completed: 1630; Rebuilt 1720
- Demolished: 1967
- Client: Lady Alice, Dowager Countess of Derby

Technical details
- Size: Grounds:14.7 acres (5.9 ha)

Haydon Hall was one of the three main houses of Eastcote, within what is now the London Borough of Hillingdon. The house was built in 1630 as a home for Alice, Dowager Countess of Derby who had been living in Harefield. The house remained in the ownership of Lady Alice's descendants for several years, on the side of her eldest daughter. For a time the house was renamed "Eastcote Park" though was returned to the original name.

Under the ownership of Lawrence James Baker from 1864, the house was expanded with two wings, and several cottages for workers were built within the grounds. Baker also had Eastcote Lodge built within the estate, which his son and daughter-in-law moved into after their marriage.

Despite being purchased by the Ruislip-Northwood Urban District Council (RNUDC) and Middlesex County Council to serve as the RNUDC's new civic centre, the house fell into a state of disrepair during the Second World War and was eventually demolished in 1967. The area where the house stood still retains the Haydon Hall name, and includes a cricket club and public meeting rooms.

== History ==
=== Ownership ===
Alice, Dowager Countess of Derby was already living at Harefield Place, although she became concerned that Lord Castlehaven, the second husband of her eldest daughter, Lady Anne Stanley, would attempt to claim her estate in the event of her death. She had Haydon Hall built in 1630, although Lord Castlehaven was tried and executed the following year. After Lady Alice died in 1636, her eldest daughter reverted to her first married name, Lady Chandos, and became owner of the house.

The house remained in the possession of Lady Chandos' descendants for several generations until 1675, when it was bought by George Sitwell. He had moved to Eastcote in 1668 from Eckington to marry Elizabeth Hawtrey, whose family owned the nearby Eastcote House. Sitwell was an ironmaster, although his ironworks failed and he was lent money by his father-in-law, Ralph Hawtrey, with Haydon Hall as security. As a result of the failure, he was declared bankrupt in 1693, and his sister-in-law Mary's husband, Thomas Franklin, purchased it from him in 1698 having been his creditor. Franklin had the house rebuilt in the Classic style in 1720 and it was renamed "Deanes".

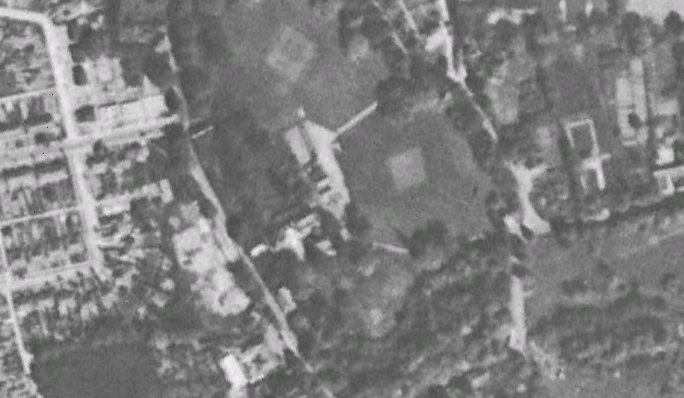
Haydon Hall and grounds in 1945

Under the later ownership of the Scropes family from Cockerington, the house was renamed "Eastcote Park" from 1770 until 1789 when it returned to the original Haydon Hall name. The house passed to George Woodroffe in 1799, who held the position of Chief Protonotary of the Court of Common Pleas. Woodroffe was also on the bench in Uxbridge and remained owner of Haydon Hall until 1822.

The Methodist preacher Dr Adam Clarke lived in the house between 1824 and 1832. Dr Clarke founded a place of worship nearby on Joel Street in 1826 which was regularly very well attended. It was expanded in March 1827 to include a Sunday school, continuing after Dr Clarke's death in 1832 until his daughter-in-law's husband, John Harnett, forced the Methodists to leave the cottage. A new place of worship was soon established in Field End Road in 1848.

Lawrence James Baker of the London Stock Exchange bought the house and grounds in 1864 and had two additional wings added. Baker had several new cottages built for workers within the grounds, designed by Harold Peto of Eastcote House and Ernest George. Peto's sister, Helen Agnes Peto, married Baker's son, Lawrence Ingham Baker. The newly married couple moved into Eastcote Lodge, built within the grounds and designed by Peto and George.

Baker leased the rights to shoot in Copse Wood, Park Wood and Manor Farm from their owner, King's College, Cambridge. He bought the land in 1873, eventually owning 387 acres (157 ha), and had gamekeeper's cottages built in Fore Street and Mad Bess Woods.

=== Final years ===
After Lawrence James Baker moved to Ottershaw Park in Chertsey in the 1880s, he let out Haydon Hall to Captain Bennett-Edwards from 1886. Captain Bennett-Edwards and his wife, a novelist, opened the grounds for flower shows, and established a cricket ground for the Eastcote Cricket Club. The house was later bought by Mrs Bennett-Edwards. After her death in 1936, the Ruislip-Northwood Urban District Council and Middlesex County Council bought the house and grounds, intending to make it the new civic centre. The outbreak of the Second World War delayed the conversion work, and following a long period of deterioration, the house was eventually demolished in 1967. The grounds were retained for the public and continue to be used by Eastcote Cricket Club.

The Friends of Eastcote House Gardens issued in 2016 Haydon Hall's Forgotten History by Andy Weller.
