= Ruislip Woods =

Woodland in Ruislip, London

Coordinates: 51.593°N 0.431°W

- Site of Special Scientific Interest
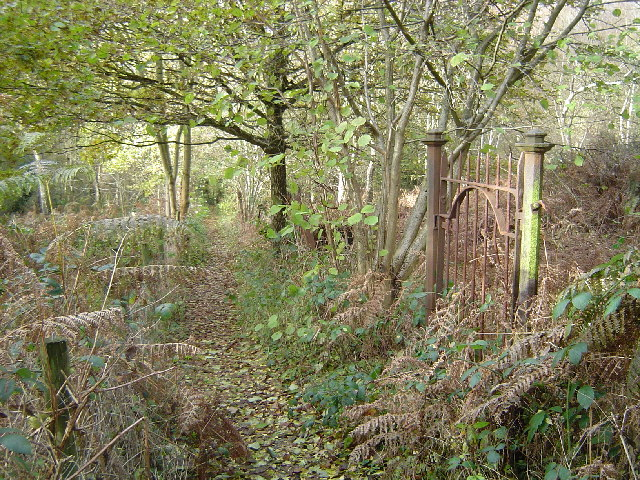
- Section of the Hillingdon Trail running through Park Wood in Harefield
- Location of Ruislip Woods.
- Area of search: Greater London
- Grid reference: TQ081892
- Interest: Biological
- Area: 305.4 ha (755 acres)
- Notification date: 1990
- Location map: Magic Map

Ruislip Woods is a Site of Special Scientific Interest and national nature reserve covering 726 acres (294 ha) in Ruislip in the London Borough of Hillingdon. The woods became London's first national nature reserve in May 1997. Ruislip Local Nature Reserve at TQ 090 899 is part of the national nature reserve.

Evidence of Bronze Age settlements has been found within the woods during archaeological excavations. Timber from the woods has been used in the building of several nationally significant buildings, as well as locally; the Great Barn at Manor Farm was built from oak from the woods.

Ownership of the woods passed with the manor from Ernulf de Hesdin to Bec Abbey and on to King's College, Cambridge over the years, until Park Wood was sold to the local authority. The remaining woods were purchased from other owners and Ruislip Woods was formed.

== History ==
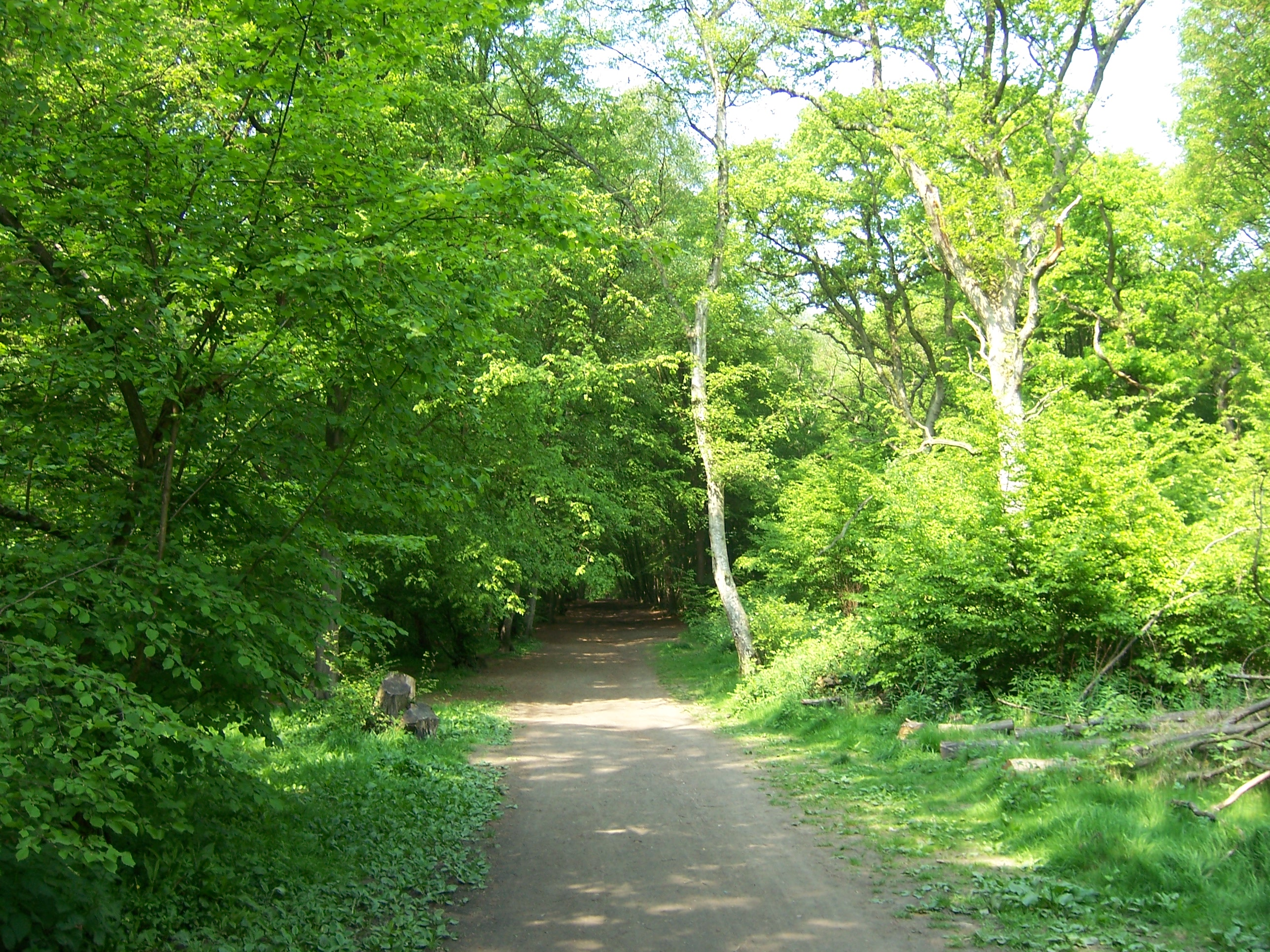
Pathway through Park Wood

Use of the wood has been dated back to the Bronze Age, after a barbed spearhead was discovered by a metal detector user. During an excavation of the findspot in 1984 the spearhead, measuring 4.75 inches (121 mm) in length, was found to have been lying in an oval pit with fragments of pottery, indicating it to be the collection of domestic waste from a settlement.

The woods are the remains of the dense woodland which would have covered the county of Middlesex from prehistoric times. Woodland was cleared over time for farming and housing.

Following the Norman conquest of England in 1066, Ernulf de Hesdin was given the manor of Ruislip, which included the woods, in recognition of his service to William the Conqueror. In 1087, Ernulf de Hesdin passed the manor to the Bec Abbey. During the Abbey's ownership, timber from the woods was used in the construction of the Tower of London in 1339, Windsor Castle in 1344, the Palace of Westminster in 1346 and the manor of the Black Prince in Kennington. Locally, the Great Barn on the Manor Farm site was constructed of oak from the woods. King's College, Cambridge became lords of the manor in 1451.

The manor of Ruislip became part of the Ruislip-Northwood Urban District, though it remained under the ownership of King's College, Cambridge. A town-planning competition led to a design being chosen that envisaged the clearance of much of the woods and historic sites in Ruislip to make way for 7,642 homes, enough for 35,000 residents, across the manor. A planning scheme adapted from the original was presented to the public in February 1913 and was approved by the Local Government Board in September 1914. The outbreak of the First World War halted all construction work, by which time only three new roads had been completed. It did not resume again until 1919.

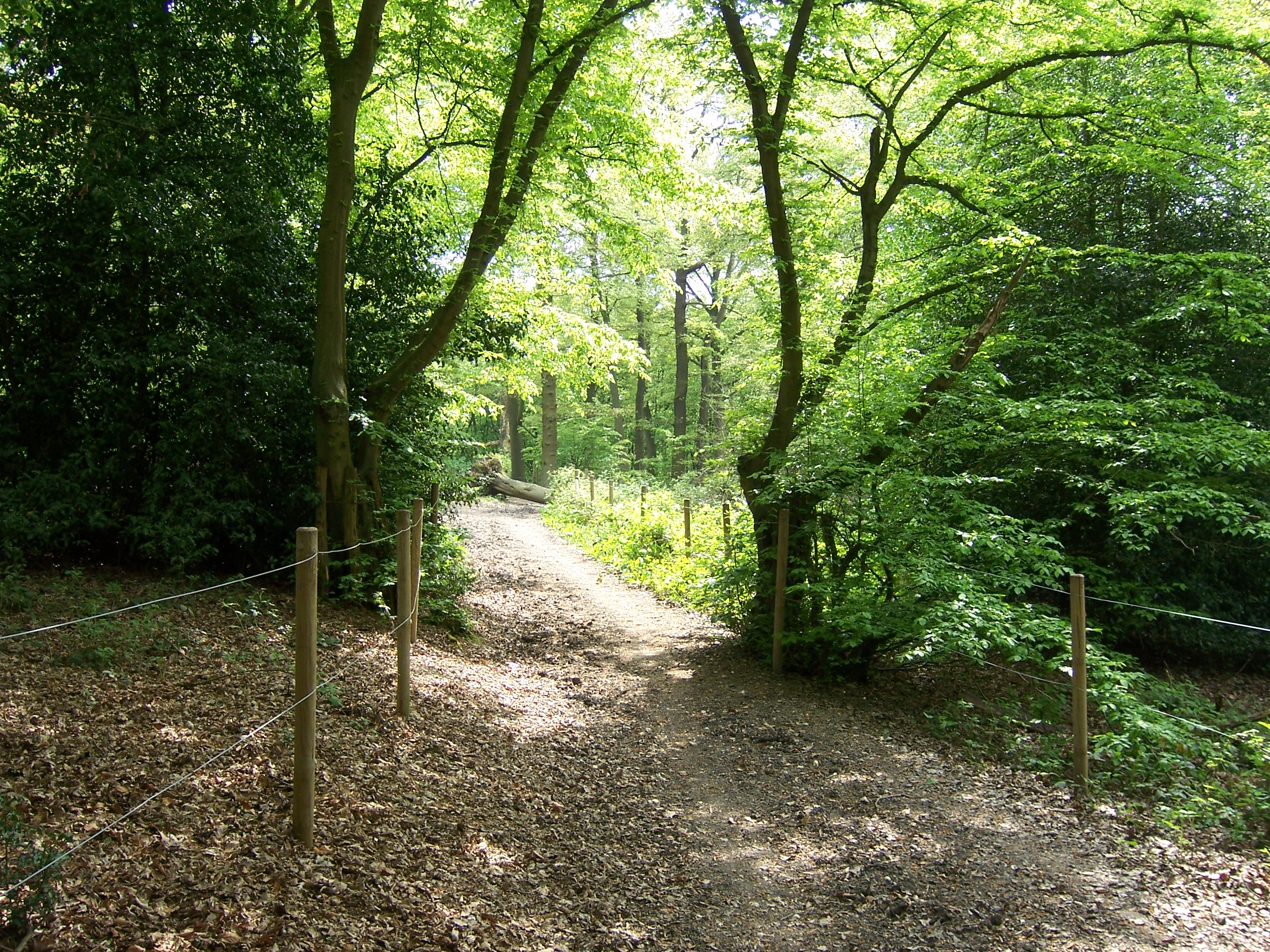
The David Brough cycle trail through Bayhurst Wood

In February 1931, the woods were included in a sale by King's College to the urban district council. Park Wood was sold for £28,100, with Manor Farm and the old Post Office included as a gift to the people of Ruislip. King's had also wished to present the wood as a gift but was required by the University and College's Act to receive payment as it was the trustee of the land. Middlesex County Council contributed 75% of the cost, as the urban district council argued that many of those who would make use of the land would be recreational day-trippers from outside the district. Under a 999-year lease, the council agreed to maintain the wood and ensure no new building was constructed without the permission of the county council. An area of the wood to the south was not included in the lease agreement and three residential roads were later constructed on it.

Copse Wood was purchased by Middlesex County Council and London County Council in 1936 for £23,250, being joined by Mad Bess Wood in the same year. The urban district council, together with Middlesex and London County Councils, purchased the 186 acres (75 ha) wood for £28,000 in a compulsory purchase from Sir Howard Stransom Button.

In 1984, Battle of Britain House, which had been built in Copse Wood in 1905 by Josef Conn, was destroyed by fire and the ruins demolished. The house was originally a private home, but during the Second World War was used by the United States military to train saboteur agents for missions in occupied France.

On 21 May 1997, the woods became a national nature reserve, the first in an urban area of England. The Ruislip Woods Trust was established that year as a charity dedicated to the conservation of the woods, while encouraging greater public interaction with them.

In June 2008, a new off-road cycle trail was unveiled in Bayhurst Wood, named after the former head of democratic services at Hillingdon Council in recognition of his long service to the borough. The "David Brough Cycle Trail", covering 2 kilometres (1.2 mi), was officially opened on 24 June.

== Flora and fauna ==
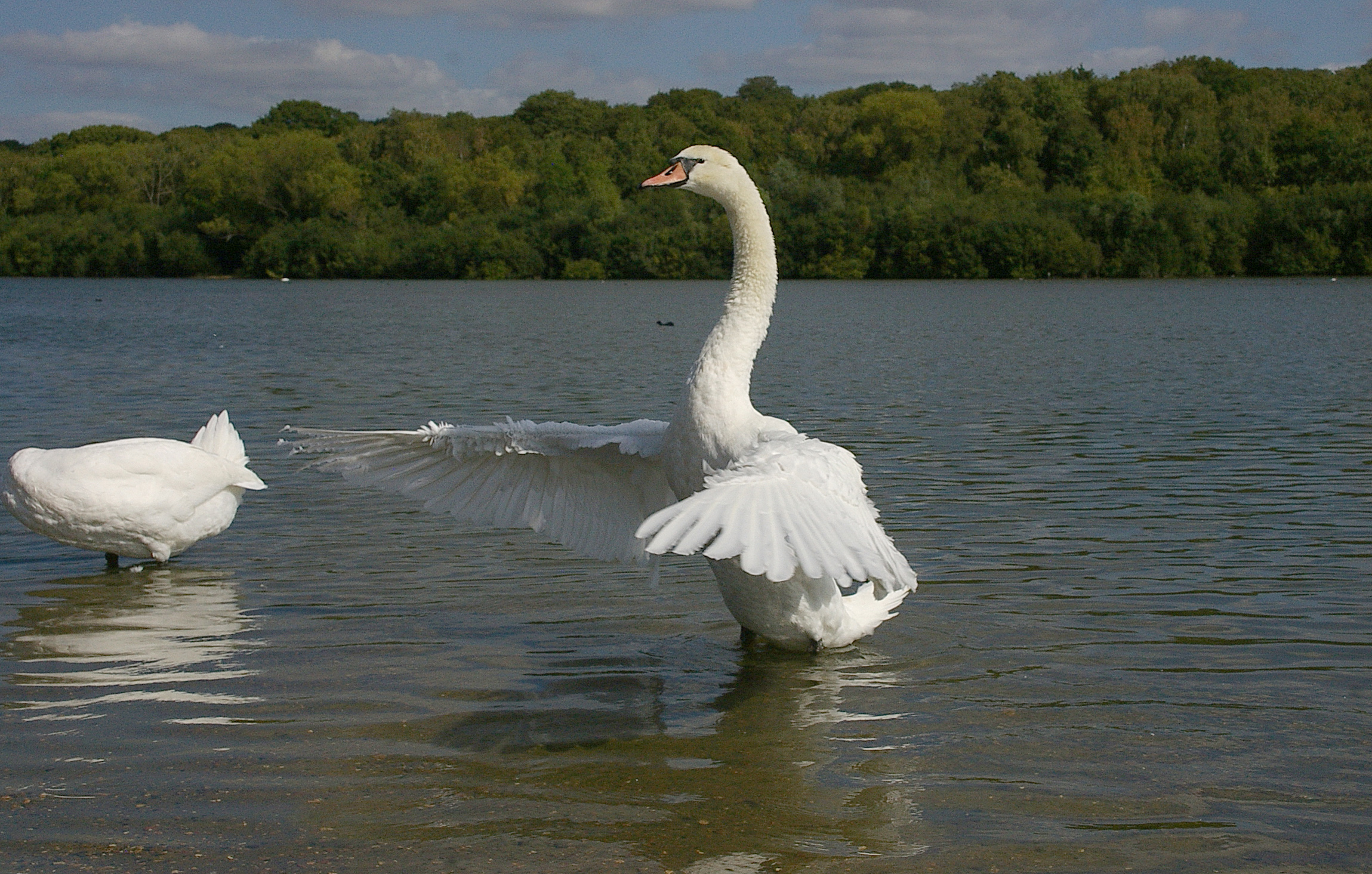
Mute swans are commonly found at Ruislip Lido. Park Wood is in the background.

The main species of trees in the woods include English oak, sessile oak, hornbeam, beech, silver birch, wild service tree, aspen, rowan, field maple, crack willow, wild cherry, hazel and holly.

Wild flowers are also in abundance around the woods, and include common knapweed, harebell, rosebay willowherb, heather, bluebell, woodanemone, yellow archangel, snowdrops and honeysuckle.

According to the London Borough of Hillingdon, the most common species' of birds found within the woods are mute swan, Canada goose, robin, green woodpecker, jay, nuthatch, lesser spotted woodpecker, greater spotted woodpecker, cuckoo, sparrowhawk, tree creeper, tawny owl, willow tit and woodcock.

Cattle are grazed in Poor's Field each year to maintain the level of the vegetation. Wild mammals include foxes, hedgehogs, stoats, weasels, mink, grey squirrels and badgers. Several species of bat also live in the woods.

== Management ==
The reserve covers four woods: Park Wood, Mad Bess Wood and Copse Wood in Ruislip, with Bayhurst Wood in Harefield. Poor's Field and Tartleton's Lake in Ruislip are also part of the reserve. There is no definitive explanation as to why Mad Bess Wood received its name, although one theory is that it was named after a female landowner who patrolled the wood looking for poachers.

The woods are managed by the London Borough of Hillingdon, which inherited them from the former Ruislip-Northwood Urban District. The council maintains the volunteer-run Ruislip Woodlands Centre in the grounds of Ruislip Lido, a reservoir within Park Wood. Ruislip Woods received the Green Flag Award in 2006.

The woods were coppiced on rotation throughout the years with the timber being sold to local tanneries. By the time King's College took ownership of the manor, the woods were let out for pheasant shooting. Coppicing of the woods continues today, under a 20-year rotation to aid in the natural growth of the woodland.

Ducks Hill Road and Breakspear Road North pass through the woods in Ruislip and Harefield respectively.

== See also ==
- List of Sites of Special Scientific Interest in Greater London
- Hillingdon parks and open spaces
