= Hayes, Hillingdon =

Town in west London, England

Coordinates: 51.5127°N 0.4211°W

Hayes
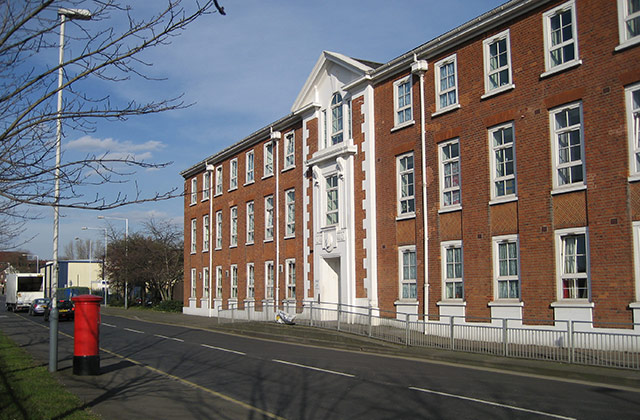
- Former EMI headquarters, Hayes

- Location within Greater London
- Population: 93,928 (2021 Census)
- OS grid reference: TQ095805
  - Charing Cross: 13 mi (21 km) E
- London borough: Hillingdon
- Ceremonial county: Greater London
- Region: London
- Country: England
- Sovereign state: United Kingdom
- Post town: HAYES
- Postcode district: UB3, UB4
- Dialling code: 020
- Police: Metropolitan
- Fire: London
- Ambulance: London
- UK Parliament: Hayes and Harlington
- London Assembly: Ealing and Hillingdon

Hayes is a town in west London. Historically situated within the county of Middlesex, it is now part of the London Borough of Hillingdon. The town's population, including its localities Hayes End, Harlington and Yeading, was recorded in the 2021 census as 93,928. It is situated 13 miles (21 km) west of Charing Cross, or 6.5 miles (10.5 km) east of Slough. Hayes is served by the Great Western Main Line, and Hayes & Harlington railway station is on the Elizabeth line. The Grand Union Canal flows through the town centre.

Hayes has a long history. The area appears in the Domesday Book (1086). Landmarks in the area include the Grade II* listed Parish Church, St Mary's – the central portion of the church survives from the twelfth century and it remains in use (the church dates back to 830 A.D.) – and Grade-II-listed Barra Hall, the Town Hall from 1924 to 1979.

Hayes is known as the erstwhile home of EMI. The words "Hayes, Middlesex" appear on the reverse of The Beatles' albums, which were manufactured at the town's Old Vinyl Factory. The town centre's "gold disc" installation marks the fiftieth anniversary on 1 June 2017 of the Beatles' Sgt. Pepper's Lonely Hearts Club Band album, manufactured in Hayes in 1967. Nearby London Heathrow Airport is the largest single provider of employment.

Notable historical residents include the early modern "father of English music", William Byrd, and a pre-eminent figure of twentieth-century English literature, George Orwell.

== Etymology ==
The place-name Hayes comes from the Anglo-Saxon Hǣs or Hǣse: "(land overgrown with) brushwood". In the Domesday book (1086), it is spelt Hesa. The town's name is spelt Hessee in a 1628 entry in an Inquisition post mortem held at The National Archives.

== History ==
Hayes is formed of what originally were five separate villages: Botwell, Hayes Town, Hayes End, Wood End and Yeading. The name Hayes Town has come to be applied to the area around Station Road between Coldharbour Lane and Hayes & Harlington railway station, but this was historically the hamlet called Botwell. The original Hayes Town was the area to the east of St Mary's Church, centred around Church Road, Hemmen Lane and Freeman's Lane.

A 2007 archaeological study looks back to earliest times. It describes finds such as flint tools dating to the Paleolithic period (500,000 BC - 10,000 BC) at the sites of Botwell, EMI Company works, and Colbrook Avenue (near Dawley Road) [4.1.2]; more finds dating to the Mesolithic period (10,000 BC - 4,000 BC) at the site of Lake Farm Country Park [4.1.3]. The site of Wyre Grove (off North Hyde Road) produced finds including pottery from the Bronze Age (2,400 BC - 700 BC), Iron Age (700 BC - AD 43), Romano-British period (AD 43 - 410) and early Anglo-Saxon period (AD 410 - 1066) [4.1.6-11]. The report cites an 831 grant as evidence that the Botwell area has existed as a settlement since Anglo-Saxon times [4.1.12].

For some 700 years up to 1546, Hayes formed part of the Archbishop of Canterbury's estates, ostensibly owing to grants from the Mercian royal family. In that year, the then-Archbishop Thomas Cranmer was forced to surrender his land to King Henry VIII, who subsequently granted the estate to Edward North, 1st Baron North. The area changed hands several times thereafter, but by the eighteenth century, two family-names had established themselves as prominent and long-time landowners: Minet and Shackle.

John Wesley (1703–1791) and Charles Wesley (1707–1788), founders of the evangelical Methodist movement, preached in Hayes on at least ten occasions between 1748 and 1753. The Salvation Army – founded in 1865 in London by William Booth – registered a barracks in Hayes between 1887 and 1896; their hall, or "citadel", at 71 Coldharbour Lane was registered in 1927. The Hayes division served the local community for just short of a century, and in years gone by their own Salvation Army brass band performed around the town's streets. In 2024, the Salvation Army hall closed and was put up for sale.

In the 18th and 19th centuries, Hayes was home to several private boarding schools catering for wealthy families. The former Manor House on Church Road was by the 1820s a boys' school called Radnor House Academy (a.k.a. Manor House Academy); Grove Cottage, Wood End, a school for young men, opened in the 1830s; Belle House School for Boys opened on Botwell Lane in the 1840s (it is now St Mary's Convent); in the first half of the 19th century, the Wood End House School for Young Ladies stood on the site of what is now the Norman Leddy Memorial Gardens; the former Magdalen Hall on Hayes End Road was also a 19th-century private School for Young Ladies.

Wood End House (before 1848, the site of the Wood End House School for Young Ladies) was used – from 1848 to c. 1905 – as an asylum. Notable psychiatrist John Conolly (1794–1866) was one of its licensed proprietors, between 1848 and 1866. The building was demolished in 1961.

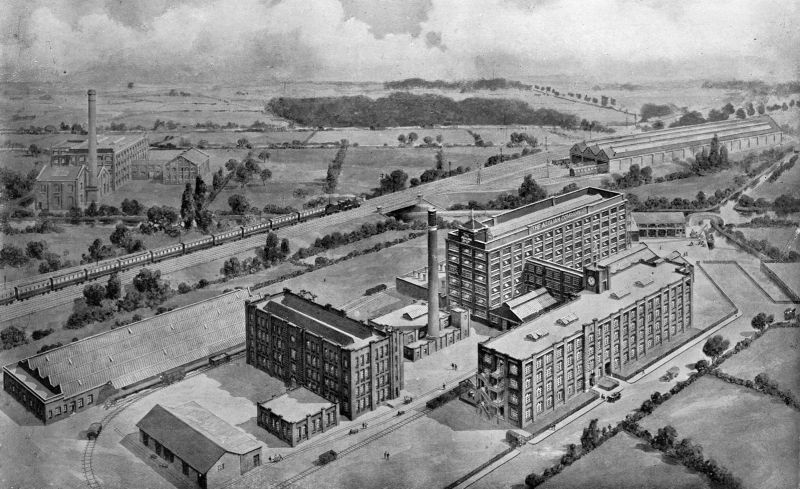
Aeolian pianola factory, Silverdale Road; c. 1920

Until the end of the nineteenth century, Hayes's key areas of work were agriculture and brickmaking. The Second Industrial Revolution brought change in the late nineteenth century, up to World War I. The town's location on the Grand Junction Canal (later called the Grand Union) and the Great Western Railway – Hayes & Harlington railway station had opened in 1868 – made it well-placed for industry.

The town's favourable location caused the Hayes Development Company to make available sites on the north-side of the railway, adjacent to the canal, and Hayes became a centre for engineering and industry. HDC's company secretary, Alfred Clayton, is commemorated in the name of Clayton Road. Residential districts consisting of dwellings of the garden suburb type were built to house workers after World War I.

In 1904, the parish council created Hayes Urban District (from 1930, Hayes and Harlington Urban District) in order to address the issue of population growth. Hayes and Harlington Urban District continued until 1965 when Hayes became part of the newly established London Borough of Hillingdon. On 1 April 1965 the civil parish was abolished. At the 1951 census (one of the last before the abolition of the parish), Hayes had a population of 49,650.

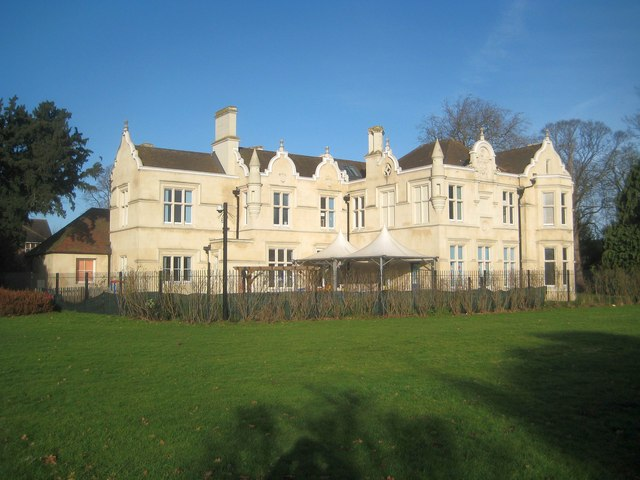
Barra Hall, the town hall from 1924 to 1979

Barra Hall – Grade II listed since 1974 – was Hayes town hall between 1924 and 1979. Originally a manor house called Grove House, in the late 18th century it was home to Alderman Harvey Combe, Lord Mayor of London in 1799. It became Barra Hall in 1875, after Robert Reid – descendant of the Reid baronets of Barra – became owner. Army Cavalry were stationed at Barra Hall during World War I. After Hayes Urban District Council bought the Hall and its grounds in 1923, the grounds of the new Town Hall were given over to public use as a public park – with playground, tennis courts and paddling pool; it was opened by actress Jessie Matthews. In July 2024, a century on from Hayes Urban District's 1923 purchase, Hillingdon Council sold Barra Hall, to HRUC. Notwithstanding the sale, the Council claimed it would safeguard the building for the future, such that it would remain a key asset to local residents.

Writer Mabel Lethbridge (1900–1968) was a munitions worker in World War I at National Filling Factory No. 7, Hayes when on 23 October 1917 she was severely injured in an explosion: others were killed. Lethbridge was at the time the youngest person to receive the British Empire Medal – in recognition of her service – and she wrote about her experience at the Hayes munitions factory in her first book, Fortune Grass (1934). National Filling Factory No. 7 was situated on land south of the railway which would later become Nestles Avenue, extending almost down to where the M4 at Cranford is now. The Hayes munitions factory employed approximately 10,000 women and 2,000 men.

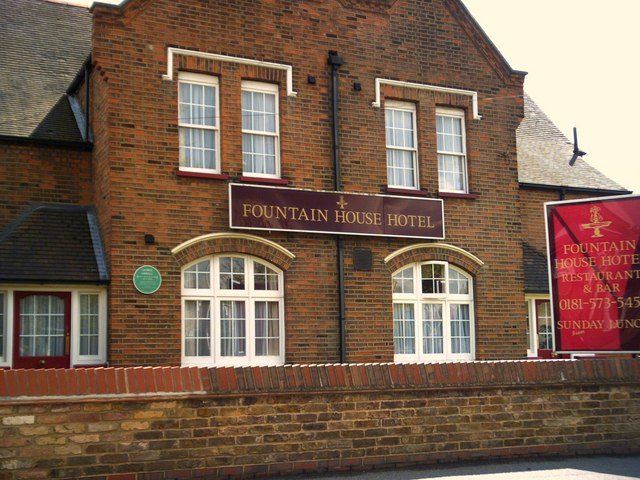
Fountain House Hotel, Church Road; 2004

Author George Orwell, who adopted his pen name while living in Hayes, lived and worked in 1932–3 as a schoolmaster at The Hawthorns High School for Boys, situated on Church Road. The school subsequently closed and the original building survived until 2022 as the Fountain House Hotel. The hotel displayed a plaque commemorating its distinguished former resident. Returning several times to Hayes, Orwell was at the same time characteristically acerbic about his time in the town, camouflaging it lightly as West Bletchley in Coming Up for Air, as Southbridge in A Clergyman's Daughter, and grumbling comically in a letter to Eleanor Jacques:

Hayes . . . is one of the most godforsaken places I have ever struck. The population seems to be entirely made up of clerks who frequent tin-roofed chapels on Sundays and for the rest bolt themselves within doors.

The present-day Hayes Police Station – at 755 Uxbridge Road, UB4 8HU – opened on 19 June 1938.

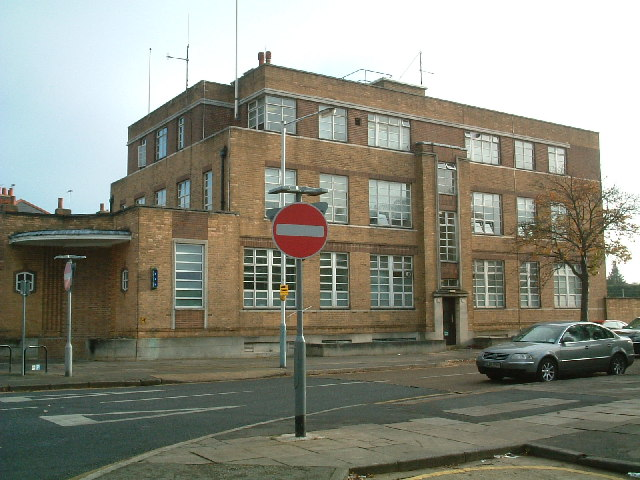
Hayes Police Station, on the Uxbridge Road

The Grade II listed War Memorial at Cherry Lane Cemetery on Shepiston Lane commemorates what is believed to have been the most serious single incident (in respect of casualties) in Hayes during World War II. Thirty-seven workers of the Gramophone Company, Blyth Road – then the town's largest employer – were killed on 7 July 1944 when a German V-1 flying bomb or "doodle-bug" hit a factory surface air-raid shelter. The original bomb census form, now held in the National Archives, confirms that it was a flying bomb which landed at 14.59 hours, killing twenty-four people and seriously injuring twenty-one (some of the seriously injured died later). The bomb came down at the main entrance to one shelter, causing the concrete roof to collapse. Some of the badly injured were able to be rescued from the emergency exit at the rear, but others were trapped for some hours. Twelve of the victims are buried in a mass grave in Cherry Lane Cemetery.

The Sound of Hayes Clock is located at the junction of Station Road and Station Approach. The Cabinet Office granted special permission for the clock to be inscribed in honour of Queen Elizabeth II's Platinum Jubilee. The inscription reads: "installed on 12 September 2023 to mark the reign of Her Majesty Queen Elizabeth II".

Hayes featured in a 2011 House of Commons debate about social housing in London. It was alleged in the Parliamentary debate (as recorded in Hansard) that a "sort of ruthless developer is taking over entire sites in [the Hayes] area to build the slums of the future."

=== Industry ===
Hayes has, over the years, been heavily involved with industry, both local and international, having been the home of EMI, Nestlé and H. J. Heinz Company. As well as Fairey Aviation (later merged with Westland).

The first large factory established was that of the British Electric Transformer Company (affectionately known as the B.E.T.), which moved to Hayes in 1901. The B.E.T.'s main product was the Berry transformer, invented by A. F. Berry (the company's technical adviser and a member of the board of directors); Berry also invented the Tricity cooker.

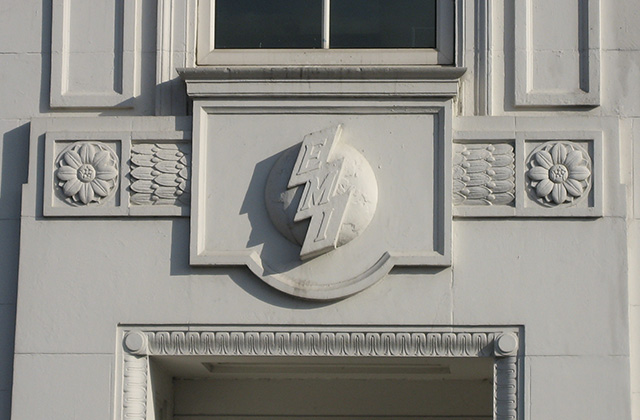
EMI logo on HQ building, Hayes

The most significant early occupier was the Gramophone Company / EMI. The Hayes factory's foundation stone was laid by Dame Nellie Melba. The EMI archives and some early reinforced concrete factory buildings (notably Grade II listed Enterprise House [1912] on Blyth Road, the first known work of Evan Owen Williams – described by English Heritage as "the most significant engineer turned architect in twentieth-century British architecture") remain as The Old Vinyl Factory.

It was here, in the Central Research Laboratories (generally known as "CRL"), that Isaac Shoenberg developed (1934) the all-electronic 405-line television system (called the Marconi-EMI system, used by the BBC from 1936 until closedown of the Crystal Palace 405-line transmissions in 1985).

Alan Blumlein carried out his research into binaural sound and stereophonic gramophone recording here. "Trains at Hayes Station" (1935) and "Walking & Talking" are two notable films Blumlein shot to demonstrate stereo sound on film. These films are held at the Hayes EMI archive. In 1939, working alongside the electrical firms A.C. Cossor and Pye, a 60 MHz radar was developed, and from 1941 to 1943 the H2S radar system. During the 1990s, CRL spawned another technology: Sensaura 3D positional audio. In an echo of Blumlein's early stereo recordings, the Sensaura engineers made some of their first 3D audio recordings at Hayes & Harlington railway station.

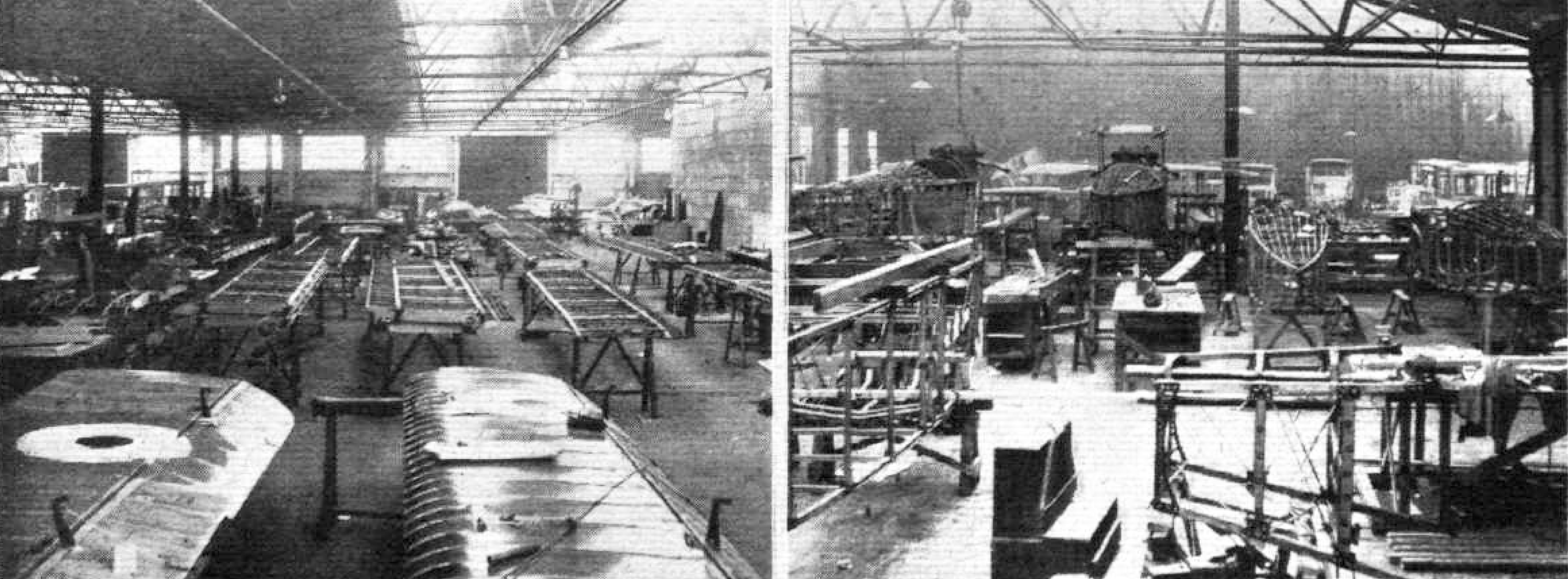
Fairey Aviation factory, North Hyde Road; 1921

During the First World War, the EMI factories produced aircraft. Charles Richard Fairey was seconded there for a short time, before setting up his own company, Fairey Aviation, which relocated in 1918 to a large new factory across the railway in North Hyde Road. Over 4,500 aircraft were subsequently produced here, but Fairey needed an airfield to test these aircraft and in 1928 secured a site in nearby Heathrow. This became the Great West Aerodrome, which was requisitioned by the Air Ministry in 1944. It was initially developed as a heavy-bomber base intended for Boeing B-29 Superfortresses, but when the Second World War ended in 1945, it was taken over by the Ministry of Aviation and became Heathrow Airport.

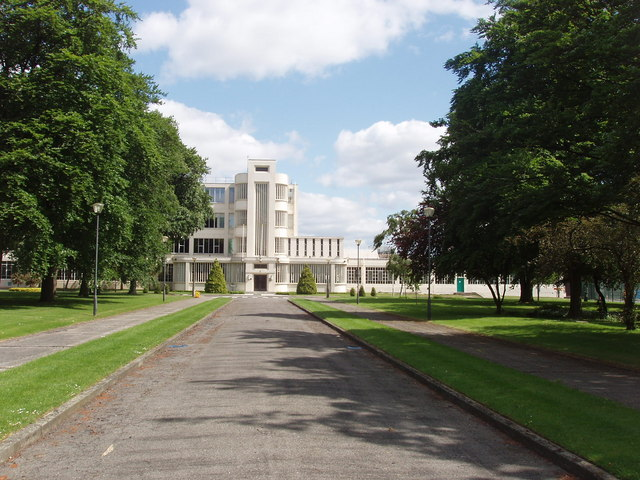
The former Nestlé Factory

In 1913, German bodybuilder and music hall performer Eugen Sandow – famous in his time as "Sandow the Great", a contender for the title of world's strongest man – opened a cocoa factory in Hayes. Sandow's fortunes plummeted in World War I. The Sandow Cocoa Company went into liquidation, and the building and assets passed to the Hayes Cocoa Company in 1916. Hayes Cocoa was owned by Swiss chocolate company Peter, Cailler, Kohler.

In 1929, the Nestlé company bought out Peter, Cailler, Kohler and located its major chocolate and instant coffee works on the canal, adjacent to the railway east of the station; it was for many years the company's UK headquarters. The factory's elegant Art Deco façade was long a local landmark. The road that led to the factory was renamed Nestlé's Avenue (from Sandow Avenue, so-named after the German strongman); Sandow Crescent, a cul-de-sac off Nestlé's Avenue, remains. The Hayes Nestlé factory closed in 2014 at a cost of 230 jobs. Developers Segro bought the 30-acre Nestlé site in early 2015.

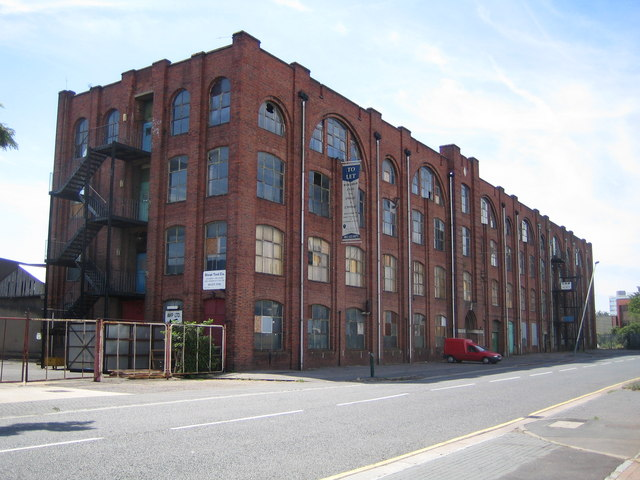
Benlow Works, Silverdale Road – Grade II listed; Walter Cave, 1909–11

Opposite Nestlé, on the other side of the canal, the Aeolian Company and its associates manufactured pianolas and rolls from just before World War I until the Great Depression. That, and the increasing sophistication of the gramophone record market, led to its demise. Its facilities were subsequently used by, among others, Kraft Foods and Wall's, a meat processor and ice cream manufacturer. Only one of the Aeolian Company's striking Edwardian buildings remains. Designed by notable English architect Walter Cave, Benlow Works (post-World War II owner Benny Lowenthal renamed the factory after himself) on Silverdale Road is a four-storey structure with Diocletian windows on the top floor. It is Grade II listed.

Food company Heinz's UK headquarters was located at South Building, Hayes Park, Hayes between 1965 and 2017. The Grade II* listed Heinz buildings were culturally significant as the only British example of the work of influential American architect Gordon Bunshaft (then principal design partner of distinguished architectural firm Skidmore, Owings and Merrill) and one of only two designs by him in Western Europe. In February 2024, Hillingdon Council heard an application in relation to the buildings' Grade II* listed status. Historic England raised concerns, saying the existing buildings were "highly significant for their sophisticated sculptural form". But the planning officers decided that conversion of significant architecture in Hayes meant "less than substantial" heritage harm, and approved the conversion of Bunshaft's designs into 124 flats.

United Biscuits – makers of McVitie's biscuits and Jacob's Cream Crackers – long had its UK headquarters in Hayes. The company formally changed its base to Chiswick in June 2021.

Callard & Bowser manufactured a popular line of English toffees and other confectionary at its Pump Lane, Hayes factory between 1956 and 1983. 635 jobs were lost in the two years leading up to the factory's closure.

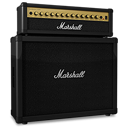
Marshall amp: first factory in Hayes, 1964

The first factory to produce the iconic Marshall amplifier opened in June 1964 in Silverdale Road, Hayes. Guitar-amplification pioneer Jim Marshall employed fifteen people to build amplifiers and cabinets in a 5,000-square-foot space.

Hayes has been home to businesses in various industries over the years. Among others: UK caravan manufacturer Car Cruiser built caravans in North Hyde Road for a short time in the early 1930s. From the early 1970s to 2003, McAlpine Helicopters Limited (Operational Support Services Limited) – later renamed McAlpine Aviation Services Limited – operated from two purpose-built helicopter hangars in Swallowfield Way, Hayes. Damont Audio was a vinyl pressing plant based in Hayes from the 1970s to 2005. "DAMONT" or "Damont Audio Ltd" is typically inscribed in the run-out groove of vinyl produced at the plant.

In 2024, industry was impacted when Hillingdon Council acquired industrial site HPH3, Hyde Park for development into more accommodation.

In 1971, Neville Sandelson, MP for Hayes and Harlington 1971–1983, articulated concern about de-industrialisation in the House of Commons: "The position in Hayes . . . is causing grave anxiety both in regard to the present and the long-term prospects. The closure of long-standing industrial firms in the area has become a contagion which shows no sign of abating". By 1982, Sandelson said the contagion had become an epidemic, reiterating: "a subject of great concern to every family in Hayes and Harlington . . . the progressive decline of industry."

=== Churches ===
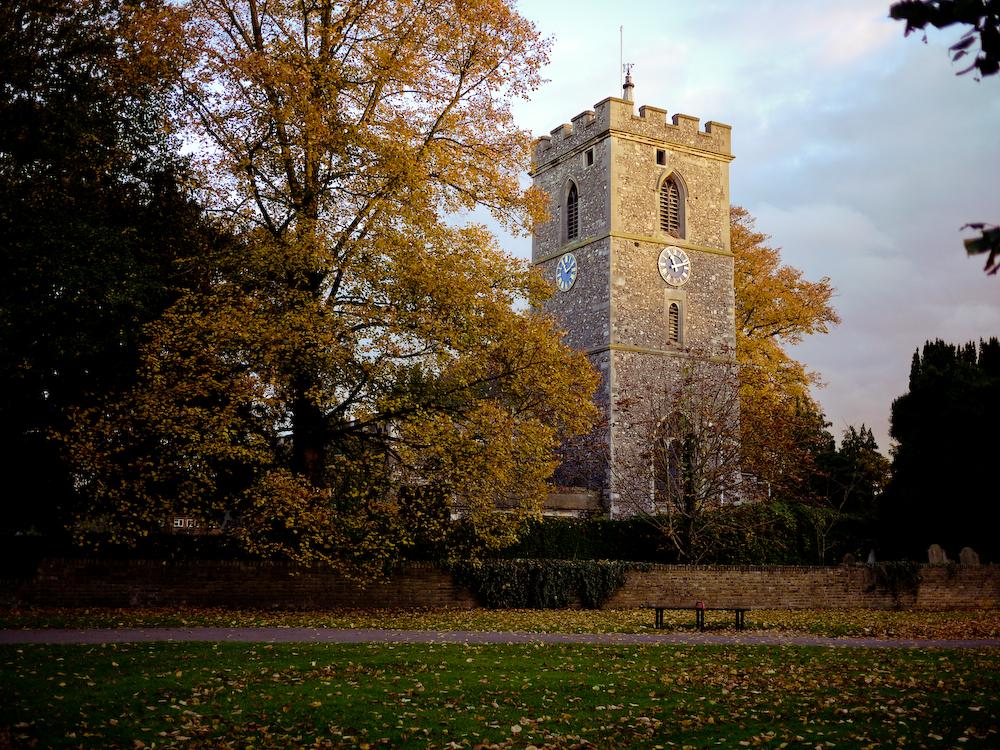
St Mary's Church, Hayes, overlooking Barra Hall Park

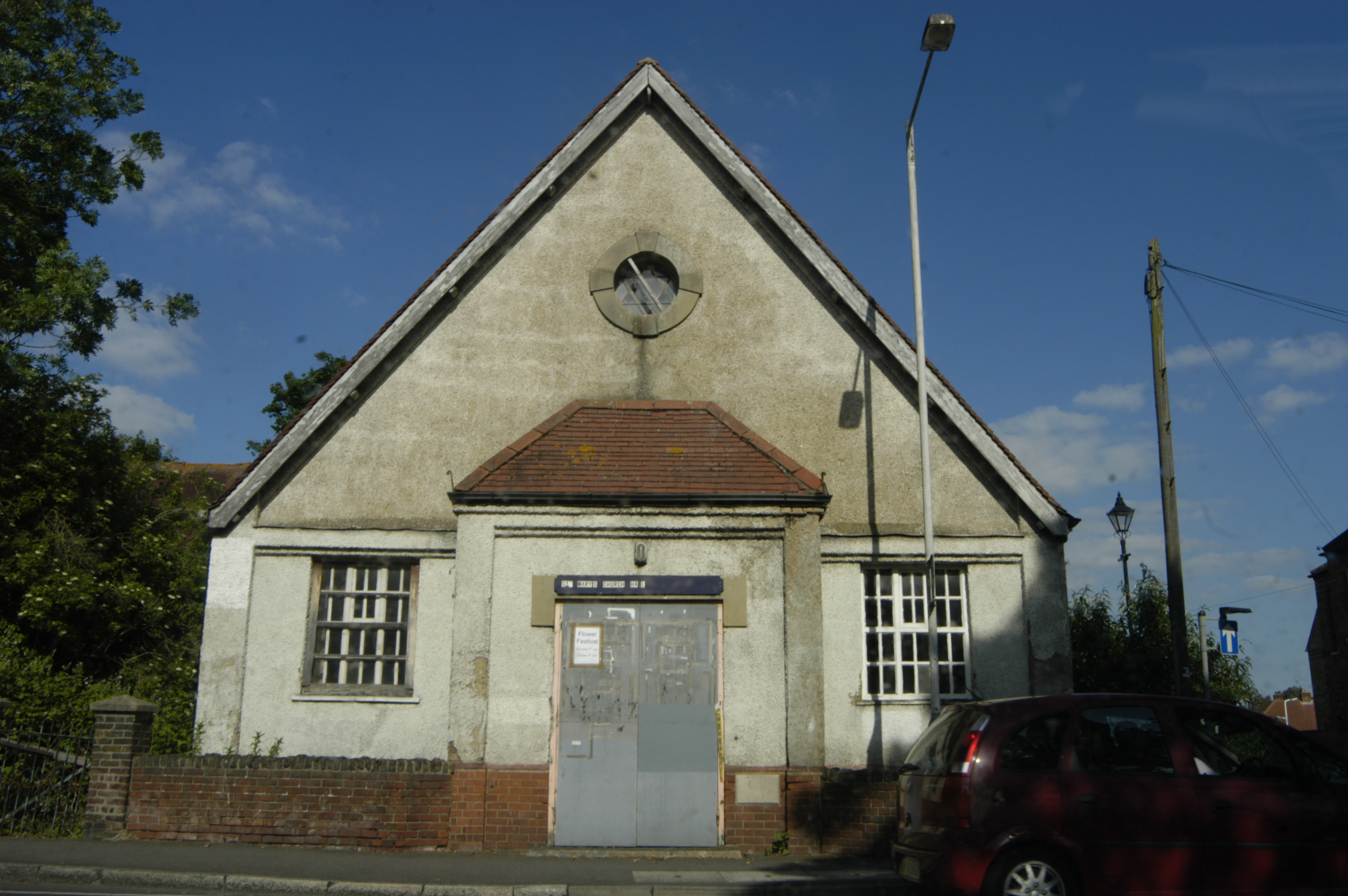
Church hall of St Mary

St Mary the Virgin Church, Hayes on Church Road is the oldest building in Hayes. It is Grade II* listed. The central portion of the church, the chancel and the nave, was built in the 13th century, the north aisle in the 15th century (as was the tower), and the south aisle in the 16th century, along with the lychgate and the south porch. The lychgate and wall to the south are Grade II listed. Hayes's entry in the Domesday Book (1086) makes no mention of a church or chapel, and the name of St Mary suggests a 12th-century dedication as it was at this time that church dedications in this name first appeared in England. Besides the church, the other main building in medieval villages was the manor house. The manor house formerly associated with the church was assigned to Canterbury Cathedral by Christian priest Warherdus as far back as 830 AD.

The site of the original manor house is not known, but it is likely to have been on or near the site of the building latterly on Church Road called the Manor House, parts of which dated from the early 16th century. At the time of the Norman Conquest, Archbishop Lanfranc had contacts with the parish. St Mary's has a 12th-century font, and many interesting memorials and brasses. The brass to Robert Lellee, Rector somewhere between 1356 and 1375, is purportedly the oldest brass in Middlesex. Adjacent to it is another to Rector Robert Burgeys (1408–1421). (The first recorded Rector was Peter de Lymonicen [1259]). There are tombs in the church to Walter Grene (1456), Thomas Higate (1576), and Sir Edward Fenner (1611), Judge of the King's Bench. The latter tomb covers earlier tiling on the wall and floors. Some partly uncovered pre-Reformation wall-paintings and a large mural (dating from the 14th century) of Saint Christopher with the infant Child are on the North wall. A brass to Veare Jenyns (1644) relates to the Court of Charles I, while other Jenynses, who were Lords of the Manor, link with Sarah, Duchess of Marlborough. Judge John Heath, after whom Judge Heath Lane was named, is also buried at St Mary's.

Victorian restorers donated a number of windows, and more recent additions include windows to Saints Anselm and Nicholas. The Coronation window is in the north aisle above the Triptych painted by the pre-Raphaelite Edward Arthur Fellowes Prynne. His brother George Fellowes Prynne carved the Reredos with St Anselm and St George in the niches. The embossed roof of the Nave reflects the Tudor period with emblems of the crucifixion and the arms of Henry and Aragon (the lands passed to Henry VIII as a consequence of the English Reformation). Cherry Lane Cemetery on Shepiston Lane was founded in the mid-1930s to provide a new burial ground when the churchyard at St Mary's Church had run out of space.

St Anselm's Church was completed in 1929 to the design of architect Hubert Christian Corlette. Noted designer MacDonald Gill was responsible for the panelled ceiling. The church's foundation stone was laid on 13 May 1927 by Sir John Eldon Bankes. The east window is by James Powell and Sons of Whitefriars, London. The church was Grade II listed in November 2019. St Anselm's is so-named because William Rufus (1056 – 1100) sent Archbishop (later Saint) Anselm of Canterbury (c.1033 – 1109) to stay in the manor house of St Mary's Church, as it was the nearest of the Archbishop's manors to Windsor, where William Rufus resided.

The Immaculate Heart of Mary, the Roman Catholic church in Botwell, was built in 1961, replacing the earlier church built in 1912. The adjacent school, Botwell House Catholic Primary, opened on 25 August 1931. The church's picture of the Immaculate Heart of Mary (which measures 5½m x 3m) was painted by Pietro Annigoni (1910–1988) in Florence, and took nine months to complete. The Grade II listed, early nineteenth-century presbytery, "Botwell House", was originally the home of Hayes's principal landowner, John Baptist Shackle.

== Culture ==
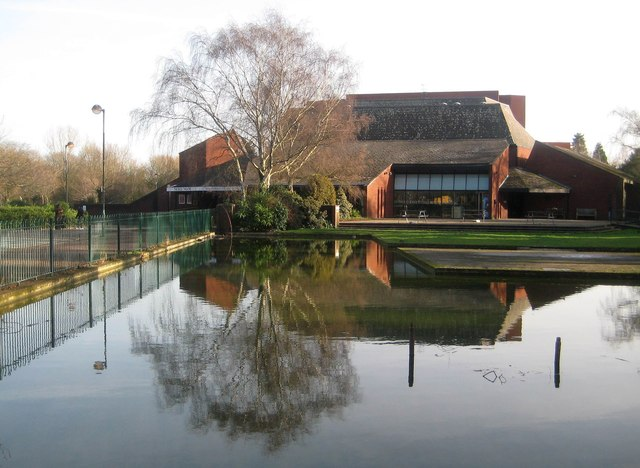
Beck Theatre, Hayes UB3 2UE

Hayes's Beck Theatre opened in 1977, and offers a wide range of touring shows. "The Beck" serves as a community theatre, hosting one-night concerts, comedy, drama, films, opera, and pantomime.

The Open Air Theatre, Barra Hall Park originated in 1951 as a community venue for music, theatre and dance. The local community raised funds for a 2005 rebuild.

Hayes's Botwell Green Library is situated in the Leisure Centre (address: East Avenue, UB3 2HW), which in 2010 replaced both the old Hayes Library (opened 1933 on Golden Crescent) and the old swimming baths (opened 1967 on the opposite side of Central Avenue). Following its 2010 closure, the derelict old Hayes Pool building was close to being used as a location for 2012 James Bond film Skyfall, but in late 2012 the Council demolished it, and in 2017 a branch of Lidl opened on the former baths site.

Pubs in Hayes include: The Botwell Inn, Coldharbour Lane; The Old Crown, Station Road; Captain Morgan's, Clayton Road; Wishing Well & Five Rivers (Ye Olde Crowne), Uxbridge Road; Brook House, Kingshill Avenue; Music Box, Bourne Avenue; and Great Western, Dawley Road. The Hayes Working Men's Club is on Pump Lane (from 1918 to 1974 it was in a large house called Sandgate on Station Road, where Iceland now stands). The Hayes Conservative Club is on Church Road; the Irish Social Club (Fáilte) – originally associated with the Botwell Club – operates here.

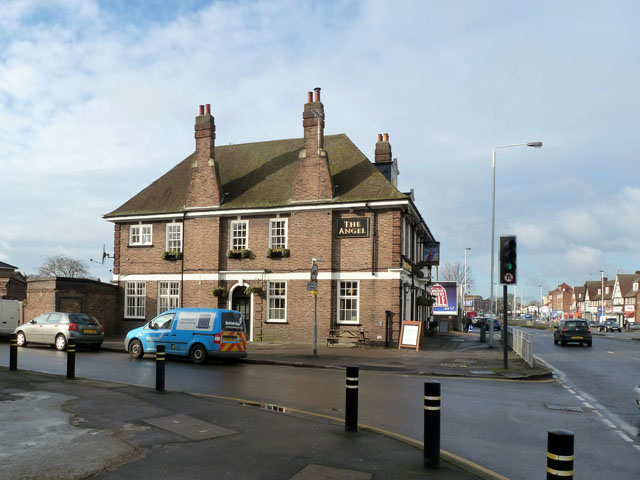
The Angel, Uxbridge Road (Nowell Parr-design; Grade II); closed 2018

Hayes had a vibrant, social pub culture for most of the 20th-century: in 1988, a long list of the town's pubs could still include the words: "many of which exist today". Pubs began to close in subsequent years, being demolished for development or converted for other uses. The Adam and Eve – formerly at 830 Uxbridge Road – was the town's earliest recorded and longest surviving inn. Though not the original seventeenth-century structure, the pub stood on the same site for over 350 years (1665–2021). Lost pubs include some other longstanding town landmarks: Vine, Angel Lane (closed 1992); Firefly, Welbeck Avenue (1999); Royal Oak, Church Road (2002); Tumbler, Station Road (2003); White Hart, Uxbridge Road (2003); Curran's, Uxbridge Road (2005); Blue Anchor, Printing House Lane (2008); Ram, Dawley Road (2008); Waggon & Horses, Uxbridge Road (2008); Royal Standard (King's Arms/Bad Bob's), Coldharbour Lane (2010); George Orwell, Coldharbour Lane (2012); Golden Cross, Botwell Lane (2014); Victoria, North Hyde Road (2014); Queen's Head (The Grange/Tommy Flynn's/Blue Lagoon), Wood End Green Road (2015); Hambro Arms (Lounge), Dawley Road (2016); Crane, North Hyde Road (2017); Angel, Uxbridge Road (2018); Carpenter's Arms, Uxbridge Road (2023); Grapes, Uxbridge Road (2024).

Social clubs likewise began to close in the 21st century. St Claret's (known locally as the Botwell Club) at the Immaculate Heart of Mary Church, Botwell Lane was officially established in 1966, but its roots went back to the 1930s, when an increasing number of Irish people began coming to live in Hayes. In its 1970s/1980s heyday, the Botwell Club was (in common with the working men's club) a "thriving community hub". The Church closed the club on its long-established footing in September 2008, and despite organisers' attempts to keep going on a new lease agreement basis, in 2013 The Irish Post noted the Botwell Club was facing closure, owing in large part to high rent. The bar & social club attached to Hayes F.C.'s century-old Church Road home-ground closed in 2010 when the football club was forced to make way for a large housing estate development. Glenister Hall (a former annex of the working men's club) and an adjacent sports-ground at the end of Minet Drive were closed and demolished in advance of a controversial 2011 housing development.

Much-loved entertainer Dame Gracie Fields visited Hayes's Gramophone factory in 1933; Pathé News footage shows Gracie pressing her four millionth record alongside factory employees and singing the title song of her 1932 film Looking on the Bright Side to huge cheers. Earlier, several noted music hall performers came to record at Hayes's Gramophone studios: George Formby's father, George Formby Sr, recorded Grandfather's Clock on 12 April 1916; G. H. Elliott recorded Mississippi Honeymoon on 17 November 1922; and Harry Lauder recorded Roamin' In The Gloamin' and other songs in March 1926, as well as visiting Hayes on other occasions in the 1910s and '20s.

Music hall strongman Eugen Sandow (1867–1925) – whose 1913 cocoa factory was significant to Hayes's history in industry (see the Industry section, above) – is commemorated in a 28-metre-high mural completed in 2022. The period-inspired artwork is on the gable-end of a ten-storey building, viewable from the Elizabeth line.

Botwell House hosted early performances by The Rolling Stones (5 August 1963) and The Who (19 April 1965). Accounts of a Whit Monday pop festival organised at Botwell House in 1963 and 1964 – where performers included Dusty Springfield, The Animals and Screaming Lord Sutch – suggest these were arguably the first examples of an open-air pop festival in the UK (excluding jazz festivals). The Blue Moon club on Church Road – next to Hayes F.C., 1964–1966 – hosted performances by bands including: The Yardbirds (10 June 1964), The Who (20 June 1965), and Eric Clapton's Cream (18 September 1966).

Marc Bolan of glam rock band T. Rex visited Hayes EMI's record pressing plant on 19 June 1972.

A song titled ‘Hayes, Middlesex’ features on indie singer/songwriter David Westlake's 2022 album My Beautiful England.

Artist Jeremy Deller's installation Sacrilege (an inflatable life-size model of Stonehenge) was installed in Barra Hall Park, Hayes from 10.30 a.m. to 6 p.m. on Sunday 5 August 2012; an estimated 1,400 people attended to view the artwork on the day.

=== Cinemas ===
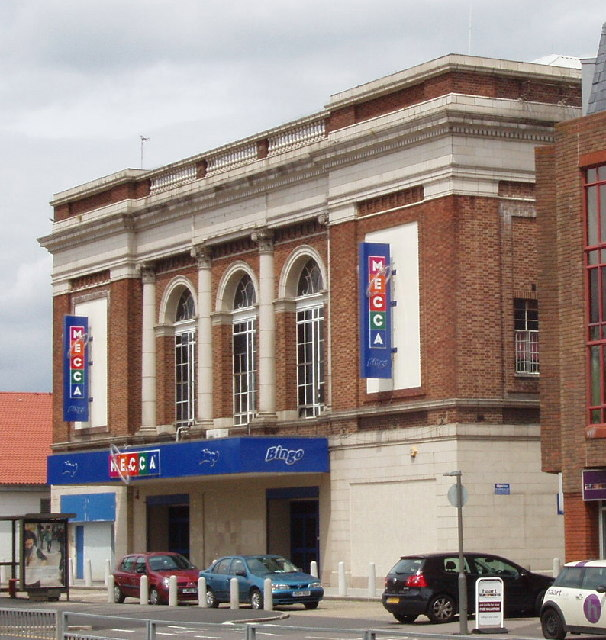
George Coles' cinema design, 466-468 Uxbridge Road, Hayes

Hayes has had six cinemas in its history. (1.) The town's first cinema, in the silent era, opened in 1913, and was named simply The Hayes Cinema. It was situated at 53–55 Station Road, Hayes – now the site of a branch of Poundland (formerly Woolworths). The Hayes Cinema was renamed Gem Cinema before its closure in the middle of World War I, in 1916. (2.) The Regent Cinema stood between 1924 and 1938 at 16 Station Road, Hayes – now the site of a branch of NatWest bank. The Regent Cinema subsequently became The Regent Theatre (1948–54). Playwright John Osborne performed at the theatre as a young actor, and stars including Kenneth Williams, Diana Dors and John Le Mesurier performed there also early in their careers. Sylvia Rayman's groundbreaking "all-women play" Women of Twilight (1951) was premiered at Hayes's Regent Theatre. (3.) The Corinth Cinema opened in 1933 at 1040 Uxbridge Road. Renamed The Essoldo in 1949, it was the first cinema in the area to be equipped with CinemaScope and stereophonic sound. After purchasing an alternative building nearby in 1957 (infra), the Essoldo chain closed this cinema in 1961. The address is now the site of the town's Point West Building. (4.) The Ambassador Theatre existed between 1938 and 1961 on the area of East Avenue, Hayes which is now occupied by the British Telecommunications Centre (formerly a GPO telephone exchange). Actress Valerie Hobson made a personal appearance on the occasion of the Ambassador Theatre's opening on 19 December 1938; she starred in the film screened for the occasion: This Man Is News. (5.) The Savoy Cinema existed from 1939 to 1957 at 466 Uxbridge Road, Hayes. The building was designed by noted cinema architect George Coles. Some famous artists performed on stage at Hayes's Savoy Cinema over the years – Max Miller, Josephine Baker and Adam Faith among them. The Essoldo chain bought the Savoy in 1957, renaming it The Essoldo in 1962 (after closing its nearby namesake in 1961). This incarnation of the Essoldo closed in 1967. Coles' building was converted into an Essoldo Bingo Club; it became a Ladbrokes Lucky 7 Club, then a branch of Mecca Bingo. A bingo hall since 1967, residents fought unsuccessfully against closure in 2023. (6.) The Classic Cinema (1972–1986) was located above a Waitrose supermarket, at 502 Uxbridge Road, Hayes. Subsequently, demolished, its entrance was immediately to the left of the former Savoy (see 5, above).

=== Media ===
Hayes FM (91.8 FM) is the town's community-focused, non-commercial local radio station. The station provides a platform for discussion of local matters, and besides playing popular music caters musically to a variety of tastes and genres, including indie, country, and urban music.

The Hillingdon & Uxbridge Times website provides news for the London Borough of Hillingdon, including Hayes and Uxbridge. The website took over from former weekly freesheet tabloid newspaper the Hillingdon & Uxbridge Times, published by Newsquest. Paper publication ceased in 2008 as a result of costs issues.

The MyLondon website provides news from across the capital, Hayes included. The former GetWestLondon website was subsumed into MyLondon in December 2018 by Reach plc.

A digital archive of the defunct Hayes & Harlington Gazette offers free access to issues dating from 1986 to 1999.

== Education ==
Primary and junior schools in Hayes include: Botwell House Catholic Primary School, Dr Triplett's, Minet, Pinkwell, William Byrd, Hayes Park, Hewens Primary, Grange Park, and Rosedale Primary; Cranford Park Academy, Lake Farm Park Academy, and Wood End Park Academy are part of the Park Federation Academy Trust.

Secondary schools in Hayes include: Barnhill Community High School, Global Academy, Guru Nanak Sikh Academy, Harlington School, Hewens College (formerly Mellow Lane School), Parkside Studio College, and Rosedale College.

Uxbridge College has a Hayes Campus, situated on the former Townfield School site, accessible from Coldharbour Lane.

== Sport ==
Hayes & Yeading United F.C. formed on 18 May 2007, following a merger of the former Hayes F.C. and Yeading F.C. Hayes & Yeading F.C.'s home-ground is (since 2016) on Beaconsfield Road, Hayes. The former Hayes F.C. started out as Botwell Mission in 1909, taking the name Hayes F.C. in 1929. The team's home-ground was on Church Road, Hayes. The Church Road stadium continued in May 2007 as Hayes & Yeading's ground until 19 April 2011, when the team played at Church Road for the last time, beating Gateshead 3–1. The former Church Road ground was demolished in 2011, and is now the site of housing. The team played in the interim at Woking's Kingfield Stadium and Maidenhead's York Road. Persevering with initial setbacks, the team is rightly back in Hayes. The Church Road ground saw the start of the career of a number of players who went on to play at higher levels, among them Les Ferdinand, Cyrille Regis and Jason Roberts MBE.

Hayes has a second Non-League football team, A.F.C. Hayes; they were known until 2007 as Brook House F.C.

Hayes Cricket Club's records date back to 1797. The club joined the Middlesex Cricketers League in the 1970s, becoming three-time League champions in the 1980s. The club subsequently entered the Thames Valley Cricket League. Hayes Cricket Club's ground is situated behind the Beck Theatre and Botanical Gardens.

Rugby football is represented by two Hayes clubs. Hayes RFC compete in the Middlesex Merit Development League, alongside London Welsh Amateurs, and teams from Hanwell, Chiswick and Whitton; Hayes RFC's home-ground is The Pavilions, Grosvenor Playing Fields, Kingshill Avenue, Hayes UB4 8BZ. Hillingdon Abbots RFC compete in the Herts/Middlesex 2 league; Hillingdon Abbots RFC's home-ground is Pole Hill Open Spaces, Gainsborough Road, Hayes UB4 8PS.

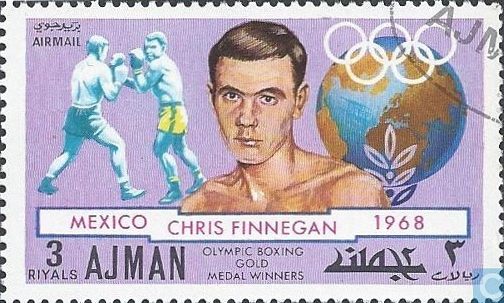
Olympic gold medal-winning middleweight boxer Chris Finnegan

Hayes Amateur Boxing Club was formed in 1948. Trainer Dickie Gunn started the club at Hayes's Townfield School. Interim locations included St Christopher's Approved School and Harlington Scout Hut, until in 1978 the club was granted a piece of land at the back of Judge Heath Lane Sports Centre. A concerted effort by club-trainers, boxers and committee-members produced for the club a purpose-built gym. In 2006 the land on which the gym was built was sold for development, and, following a campaign, a replacement facility was built to the front of the former Hayes Stadium. From its formation, the club has produced successful boxers at national competition level. Chris Finnegan represented the pinnacle of the club's success, winning the 1966 Amateur Boxing Association Middleweight title, before going on to win the Olympic Middleweight gold medal in 1968.

Hayes Bowls Club (at Botwell Green, Central Avenue) is one of thirteen bowling clubs in Hillingdon.

On 24 July 2012, Hayes was the gateway for the Olympic Torch's passage into Hillingdon borough in the 2012 Summer Olympics torch relay; the route traversed North Hyde Road and Dawley Road.

== Economy ==
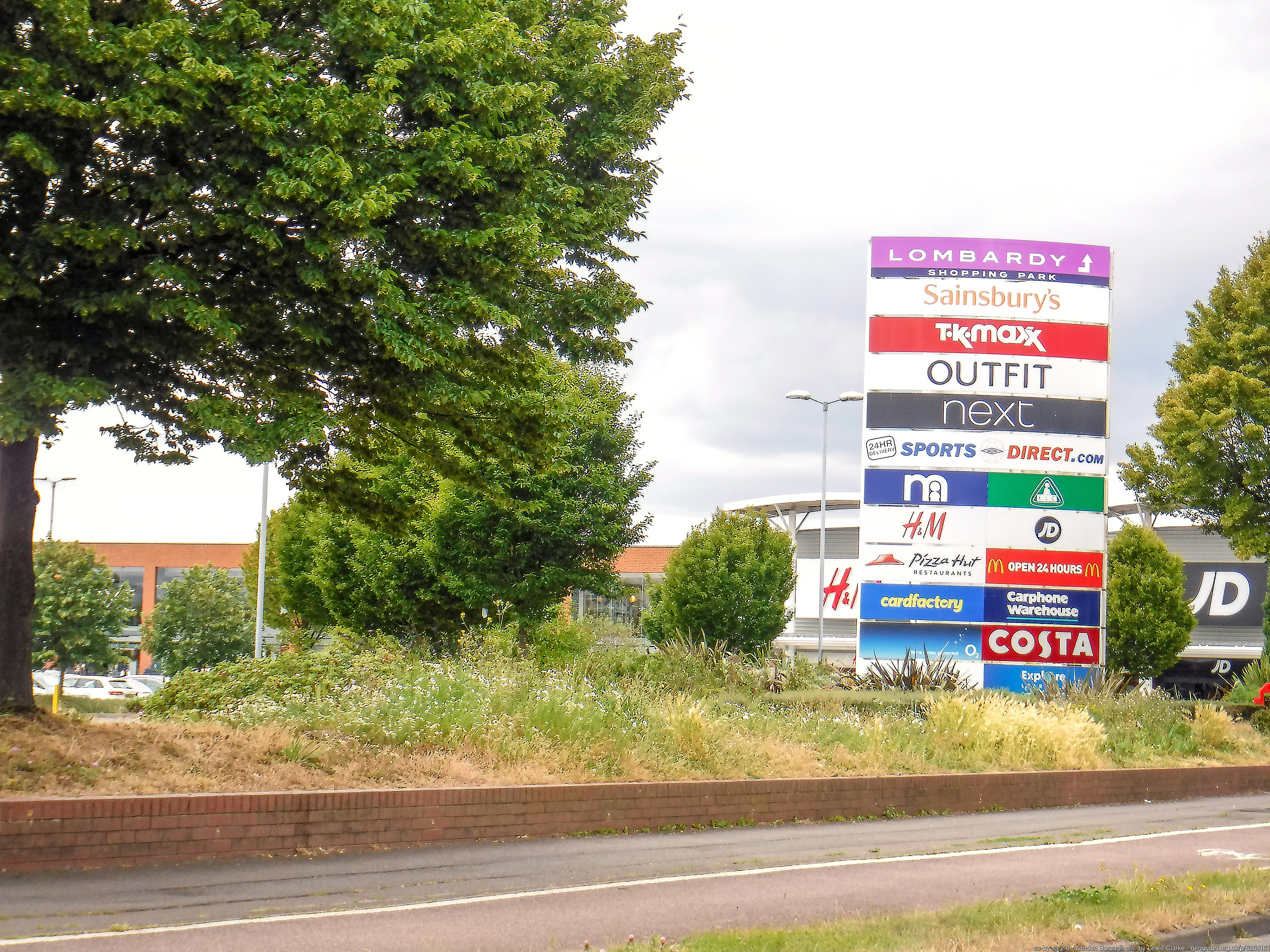
Lombardy Retail Park, UB3 3EX

Nearby London Heathrow Airport is the largest single provider of employment. The airport's presence generates numerous associated businesses – retail, international distribution and cargo-handling among them. Hotels – such as the Sheraton Hotel on Bath Road, Hayes – benefit, too, from the town's proximity to the airport.

West London Film Studios – situated on Springfield Road, Hayes – is a film and television studio equipped to accommodate everything from small TV productions to big-budget feature films. The Imitation Game (2014), Bridget Jones's Baby (2016) and Killing Eve are just a few well-known productions filmed at the Hayes studios.

Lombardy Retail Park, UB3 3EX is located near the Uxbridge Road/The Parkway crossing. The park is 220,000 sq ft (20,000 m^{2}) in size with 865 parking spaces. Shops include: Sainsbury's (replaced the popular Pump Lane branch, 1997), Currys, TK Maxx, Next, H&M, Sports Direct, McDonald's, Pizza Hut and Costa. A smaller development to the east, Hayes Bridge Retail Park, has branches of Dreams and Metro Bank.

TMD Technologies (Thorn Microwave Devices) is located in Swallowfield Way, Hayes. The firm dates back to the 1940s and EMI's high-power klystron group. It manufactures transmitters and radar equipment, and employs about 220 people.

Cloud computing company Rackspace operates its U.K. offices from Hyde Park Hayes.

Harnam Engineering Works is situated on Swallowfield Way, Hayes. Established in 1988, the company specialises in premium laser cutting, precision engineering, sheet metalwork and fabrication.

Leemark Engineering is situated on Rigby Lane, Hayes. Founded in 1967, the machining service specialises in high precision CNC milling and turning.

Wellington Engineering is situated on Betam Road, Hayes. Established in the mid-1980s, the company specialises in multiaxis and CNC machining serving a variety of industries.

== Governance and public services ==
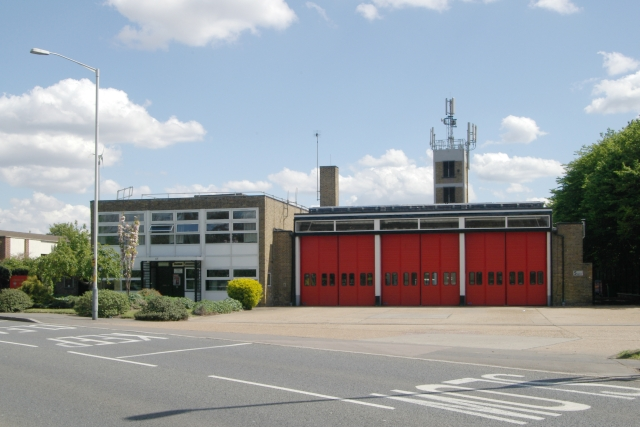
Hayes Fire Station, UB3 1LL

Hayes is in the Hayes and Harlington UK Parliament constituency. Hayes's current MP is John McDonnell (Labour).

The Metropolitan Police Service is responsible for law enforcement and the prevention of crime in Hayes. The Hillingdon Neighbourhood Watch website contains details of Police Station opening times, news, appeals, events and meetings. Crime information may be given anonymously to Crimestoppers UK.

Hillingdon Council encourages residents to report: incidents of fly-tipping, problems involving illegally parked vehicles, and potholes and road issues.

Hayes Fire Station is at 65 Shepiston Lane, UB3 1LL. The London Fire Brigade puts information regarding Hayes Fire Station, and risk and incidents in Hayes on its website.

Hayes is served by Hillingdon Hospital on Pield Heath Road, UB8 3NN.

== Transport ==
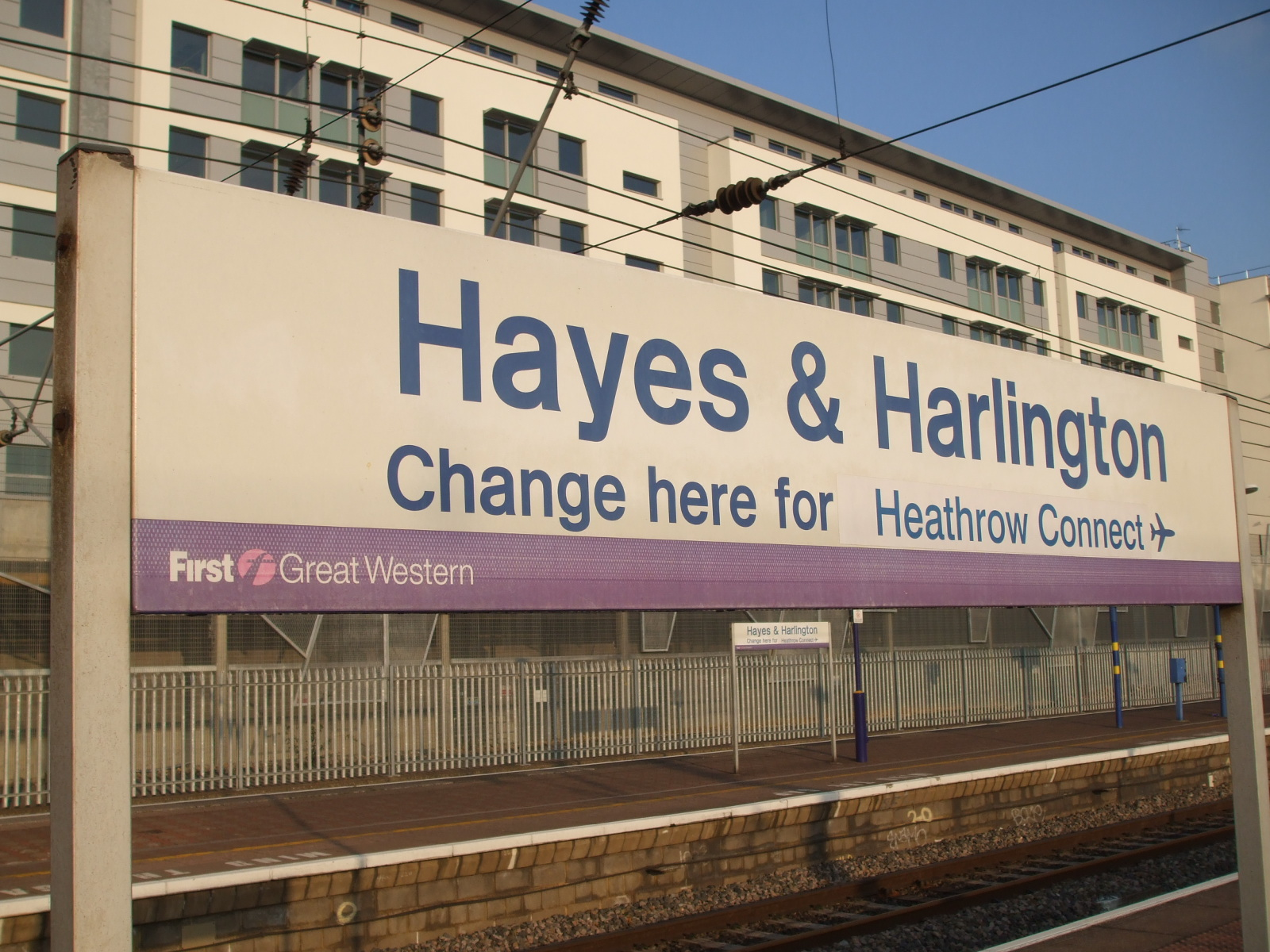
Hayes & Harlington railway station (2008)

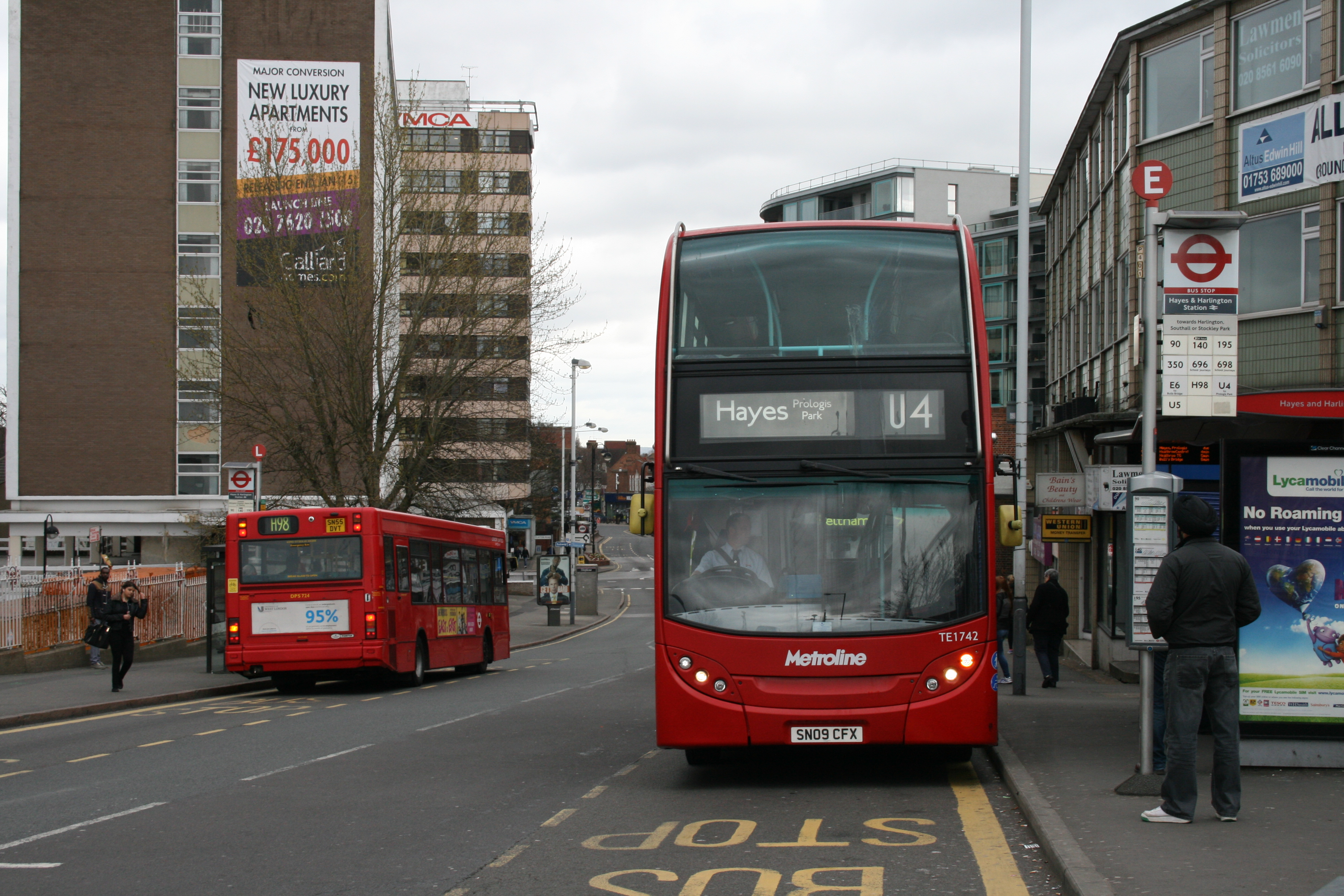
Buses H98 & U4, viewed outside the railway station (2015)

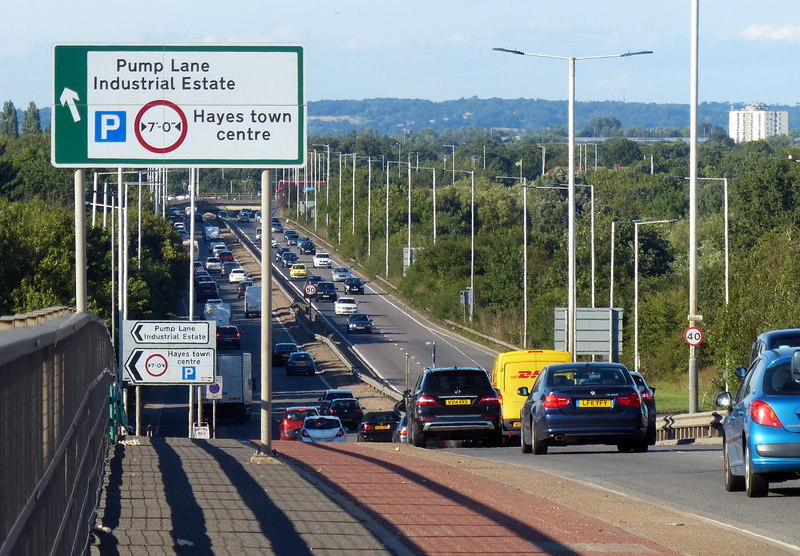
The A312 Parkway in Hayes (2015)

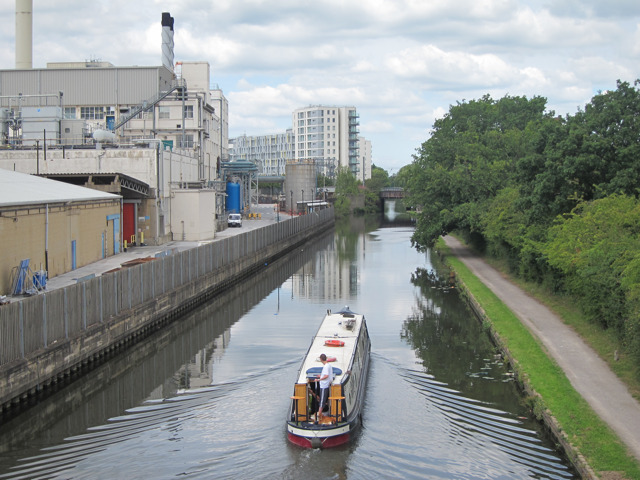
The Grand Union Canal in Hayes (2011)

=== Rail ===
Hayes & Harlington railway station is the town's main railway station on the Great Western Main Line, and the station is on the Elizabeth line. It provides direct connections eastbound to London Paddington and beyond, and westbound to Reading. It is also served by trains on the Heathrow Spur, connecting it to the airport without an intermediate stop. Hayes & Harlington station was redeveloped ahead of the opening of the Elizabeth line.

=== Buses ===
London Buses serving Hayes are:

Route	Start	End	Operator
90	Feltham	Northolt	Metroline
140	Harrow Weald	Hayes & Harlington station	Metroline
195	Charville Lane Estate	Brentford	Transport UK London Bus
207	Hayes Bypass	White City	Transport UK London Bus
278	Ruislip	Heathrow Central	Transport UK London Bus
350	Hayes & Harlington station	Heathrow Terminal 5	Transport UK London Bus
427	Uxbridge	Southall	Transport UK London Bus
696	Bourne Avenue	Bishop Ramsey School	London United
697	Hayes Lansbury Drive	Ickenham	London United
698	West Drayton station	Ickenham	London United
E6	Bulls Bridge	Greenford	Metroline
H98	Hayes End	Hounslow	London United
SL8	Uxbridge	White City bus station	Metroline
SL9	Harrow bus station	Heathrow Central	London Sovereign
U4	Hayes Prologis Park	Uxbridge	Metroline
U5	Hayes & Harlington station	Uxbridge	Transport UK London Bus
U7	Hayes Sainsbury's	Uxbridge	Transport UK London Bus
N207	Uxbridge	Holborn	Transport UK London Bus

=== Road ===
The town is close to junctions 3 and 4 of the M4 motorway. The A312 is the main north–south route. The A4020 Uxbridge Road is the main west–east route passing directly through Hayes.

=== Water ===
The Grand Union Canal runs through Hayes. Travellers by boat may moor at Hayes and take advantage of local amenities including several shops.

== In popular culture ==
=== Film ===
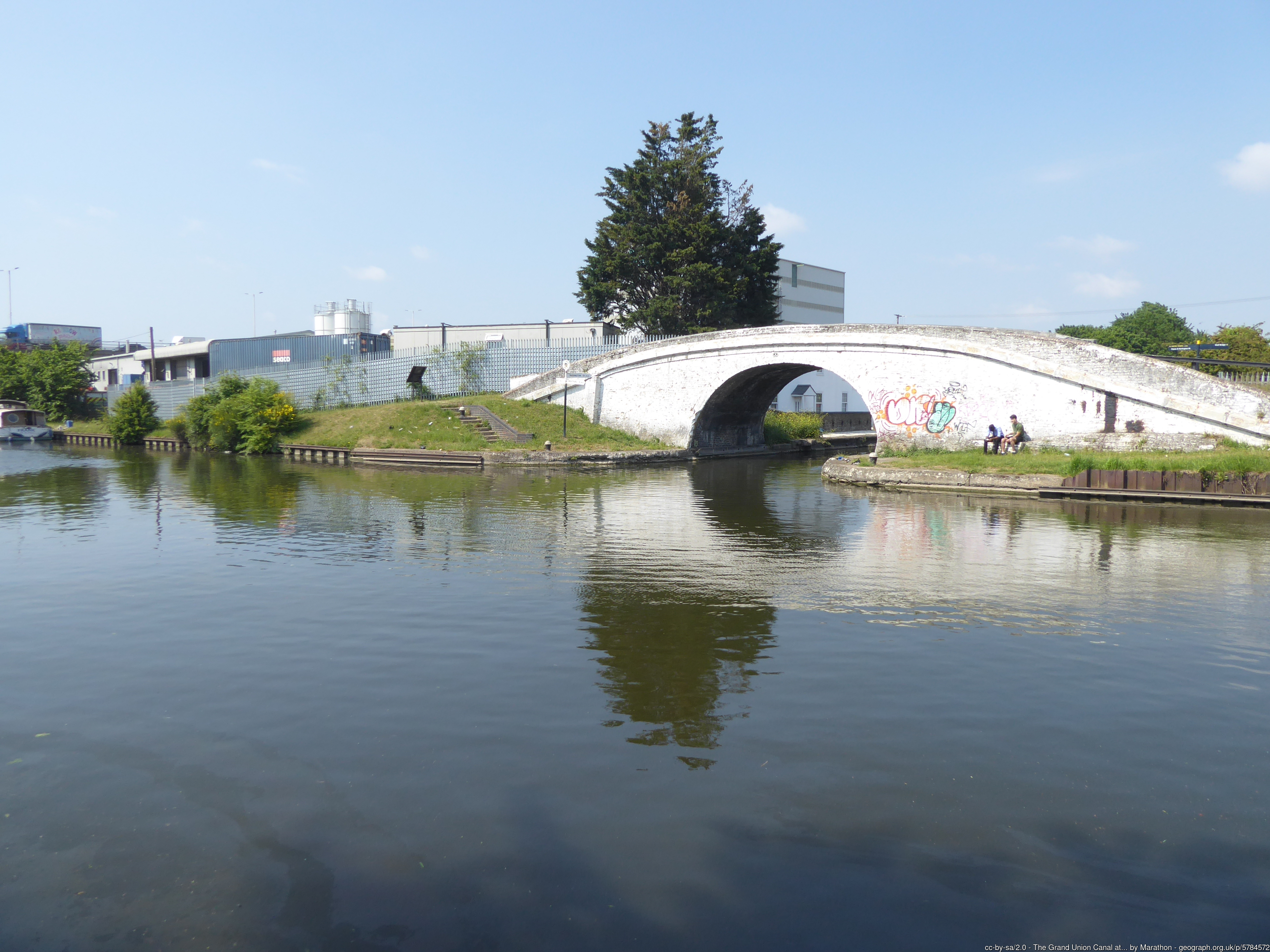
The Bull's Bridge, Hayes section of the Grand Union Canal, has been used as a filming location

Galton and Simpson-scripted comedy The Bargee (1964) stars Harry H. Corbett and Ronnie Barker as boatmen operating a canal-boat along the Bull's Bridge, Hayes section of the Grand Union Canal.

Poor Cow (1967) – a noted example of kitchen sink drama starring Carol White and Terence Stamp – was filmed partly in Hayes.

The Beatles' 1967 film Magical Mystery Tour followed the band and their entourage on a surreal musical journey. Hayes is not listed among the featured locations, but the town's name features throughout. The famous Magical Mystery Tour coach – a Plaxton-bodied Panorama 1, based on the six-wheeled Bedford VAL 14 chassis, registered URO 913E and painted yellow and blue with psychedelic logos – was chartered by EMI from Fox Coaches of Hayes, who purchased the vehicle new in March 1967. The firm's name – "Fox of Hayes" – is visible throughout the film, above the coach's licence-plate.

Parts of Chocolat (2000), starring Juliette Binoche and Johnny Depp, were filmed in Barra Hall, Hayes.

The scene in Bend It Like Beckham (2002) where Jess (Parminder Nagra) meets Juliette (Keira Knightley) was filmed in Barra Hall Park, Hayes; the Hounslow Harriers' practice pitch in the film is the nearby old Yeading Football Club pitch.

The Sheraton Hotel on Bath Road, Hayes features in four films: Otto Preminger's final film, The Human Factor (1979) starring Richard Attenborough, Michael Caine spy thriller The Whistle Blower (1986), director Ridley Scott's thriller The Counsellor (2013), and crime drama The Infiltrator (2016) starring Bryan Cranston.

Marvel superhero film Thor: The Dark World (2013) includes scenes filmed on the site of the old EMI complex on Blyth Road, Hayes.

Brad Pitt caused a stir in Hayes in November 2012 when filming scenes for horror film World War Z (2013) at locations off Hayes End Road; the actor reportedly dined at Tommy Flynn's Bar and Diner (formerly the Queen's Head & The Grange; closed 2015), on Wood End Green Road.

Keira Knightley returned to Hayes to co-star with Benedict Cumberbatch in The Imitation Game (2014), filmed at the town's West London Film Studios.

Colin Firth came to Hayes to make The Mercy (2017), studio-set scenes of which were filmed at West London Film Studios.

Judy Garland biographical film Judy (2019), with Renée Zellweger, was made at the town's West London Film Studios.

Comedians Freddie Starr (1993), Frank Carson (1993), and Mike Reid (1993 and 1998) have issued on video and DVD performances filmed at Hayes's Beck Theatre.

=== Television ===
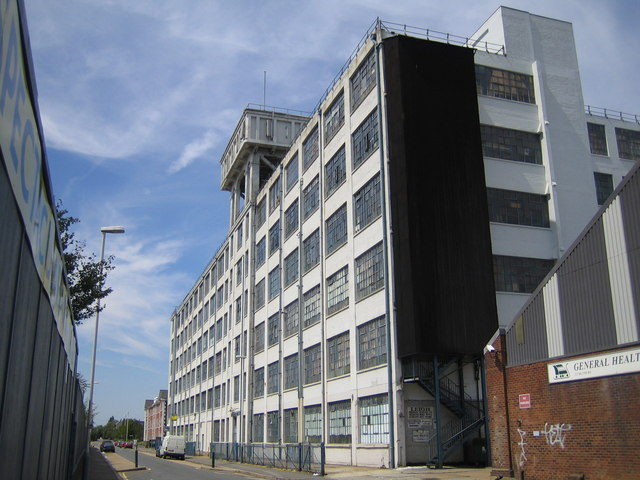
Blyth Road (Enterprise House – Grade II listed; E. O. Williams, 1912)

The BBC filmed a 1949 performance of A.G. Macdonell's stage-comedy The Fur Coat in Hayes's Regent Theatre (in existence 1948–54); the cast included Richard Bebb and silent film star Chili Bouchier.

Doctor Who, first story of Series 9 (January 1972), saw third Doctor Jon Pertwee's first encounter with the Daleks in a four-week story titled "Day of the Daleks"; filming locations included the Bull's Bridge, Hayes section of the Grand Union Canal.

Two episodes of 1970s police drama The Sweeney included scenes filmed on Blyth Road, Hayes: "Contact Breaker" (Series 1, Episode 12; broadcast 20 March 1975), and "Faces" (Series 2, Episode 2; broadcast 8 September 1975).

Rowan Atkinson filmed a swimming-pool-based episode of his popular series Mr. Bean (Series 1, Episode 3; broadcast 30 December 1990) at the (since-relocated) old swimming baths on Central Avenue, Hayes.

Channel 5 soap opera Family Affairs (1997–2005) was filmed at HDS Studios, Beaconsfield Road, Hayes, with outdoor scenes filmed at the nearby Willowtree Marina section of the Grand Union Canal.

BBC sitcom One Foot in the Grave featured the exploits of the curmudgeonly Victor Meldrew in an unnamed English suburb; Series 6, Episode 5 – "The Dawn of Man" (broadcast 13 November 2000) – included scenes filmed on Glencoe Road, Hayes.

BBC crime-drama Waking the Dead two-part episode "Multistorey" (Series 3, Parts 1 & 2; broadcast 14 & 15 September 2003) included scenes filmed around the car park above Iceland supermarket on Station Road, Hayes.

An early episode of detective drama Lewis – "Expiation" (Series 1, Episode 3; broadcast 6 July 2008) – included scenes filmed at HDS Studios, Beaconsfield Road, Hayes.

BBC crime-drama New Tricks episode "Things Can Only Get Better" (Series 10, Episode 7; broadcast 10 September 2013) included scenes filmed around Hayes & Harlington railway station.

Ricky Gervais made the 2014 Christmas special of his comedy-drama Derek at Hayes's West London Film Studios.

The final (9th) series of Peep Show (2015) was made at Hayes's West London Film Studios.

ITV television film Churchill's Secret (broadcast: 28 February 2016), starring Michael Gambon, was filmed at Hayes's West London Film Studios.

Apple TV+ comedy-drama television series Ted Lasso, starring Jason Sudeikis, is filmed at Hayes's West London Film Studios, and Hayes & Yeading United F.C.

== Notable people ==
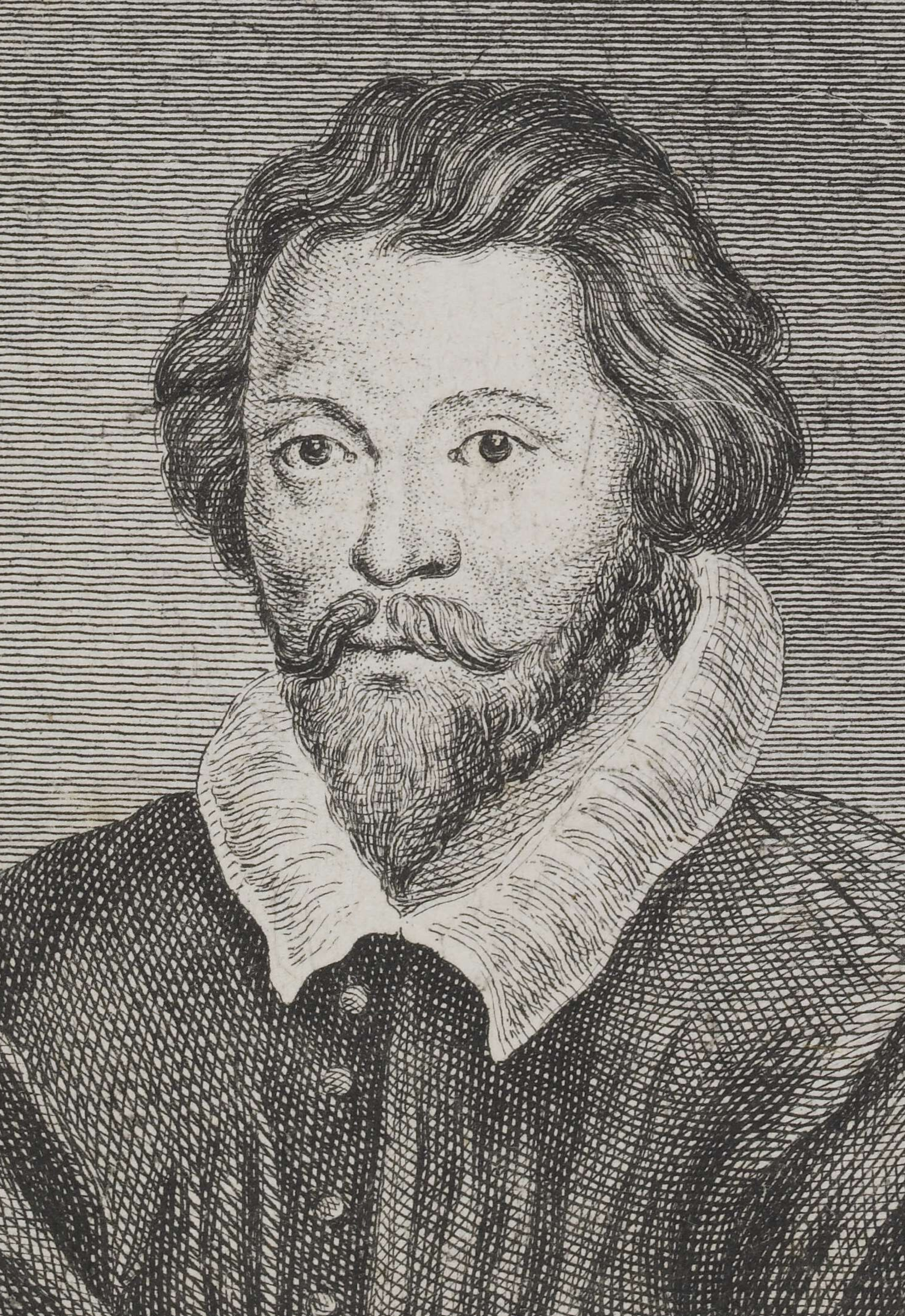
Composer William Byrd, "the father of English music", lived in Hayes and Harlington, 1578–88

- Frank Allen (1943–), bass player of sixties pop groups Cliff Bennett and the Rebel Rousers and The Searchers, was born in Hayes.
- So-called "godfather of alternative comedy" Tony Allen (1945–2023) was born in Hayes.
- Anselm of Canterbury (1033/4–1109), later Saint Anselm, was stationed in Hayes by King William II in 1095.
- Buster Bloodvessel (1958–), frontman of 1980s pop group Bad Manners, once lived on a canal houseboat in Hayes.
- Virtuoso French horn player Dennis Brain (1921–1957) – credited with producing arguably the definitive recordings of Mozart's horn concerti – lived from 1945 in a bungalow in Hayes.
- Robin Bush (1943–2010) of Channel 4's archaeological series Time Team was born in Hayes.
- Composer William Byrd (1539/40-1623), "the father of English music", lived as a Catholic recusant in Hayes and Harlington 1578–88; a primary school in the area bears his name.
- Alderman Harvey Combe (1752–1818) – Whig politician; Lord Mayor of London in 1799 – lived in Hayes and is buried in St Mary's churchyard.
- Brian Connolly (1945–1997), singer of glam rock band Sweet, lived in Hayes and Harefield.
- Disgraced disc jockey Chris Denning (1941–2022) was born in Hayes.
- Actress Anne Marie Duff (1970–) – best known for playing Fiona Gallagher in Shameless and Elizabeth I in The Virgin Queen – grew up in Hayes, attending Mellow Lane School.
- Greg Dyke (1947–), former BBC director general and former chairman of the FA, grew up in Hayes.
- Pioneer in photography B. J. Edwards (1838–1914) lived at Wistowe House (which dates from the 17th century) on Church Road.
- Chris Finnegan (1944–2009), Olympic boxing gold medalist, lived in Hayes.
- Boxer Kevin Finnegan (1948–2008), brother of Olympic gold medalist Chris, lived in Hayes.
- Bandleader Bert Firman (1906–1999) – popular in the 1920s, '30s and '40s – worked daily from 1924 to 1929 in Hayes's Zonophone recording studios.
- Actor Barry Foster (1927–2002), best known as 1970s TV detective Van der Valk, grew up in Hayes.
- Musician Paul Gardiner (1958–1984) of Gary Numan's Tubeway Army was born in Hayes.
- Major-General James Grant, C.B. (1778–1852), who served under Wellington at the Battle of Waterloo, was a lifelong Hayes resident.
- Celebrity tailor Doug Hayward (1934–2008) grew up in Hayes.
- Helch (died 2026), graffiti artist.
- Sir Peter Hendy, Baron Hendy (1953–), chairman of Network Rail and former Commissioner of Transport for London, was born in Hayes.
- England footballer Glenn Hoddle (1957–) was born in Hayes.
- Noted atomic and nuclear physicist Friedrich Georg Houtermans (1903–1966) lived between 1933 and 1935 in Hayes, where he worked for EMI.
- Golfer Barry Lane (1960–2022) was born in Hayes.
- Honey Lantree (1943–2018), drummer of sixties pop group The Honeycombs, was born in Hayes.
- Sir Francis Lee, 4th Baronet (1639–1667), politician and (from 1644) stepson of Henry Wilmot, 1st Earl of Rochester, was educated in Hayes by Dr Thomas Triplett. His son Edward Lee at age 13 married the 12-year-old Lady Charlotte Fitzroy, an illegitimate daughter of Charles II.
- Screenwriter, Audio Playwright and Graphic Novelist Tony Lee (1970–), whose work including Pride and Prejudice and Zombies, Doctor Who and Star Trek have topped the New York Times Best Seller list, was born in Hayes, attending Hayes Manor Secondary School.
- Lady Harriet Mordaunt (1848–1906), respondent in a sensational divorce case in which King Edward VII, while still Prince of Wales, was embroiled – lived for several years from 1877 in Hayes Park Private Asylum (now Barra Hall).
- Author George Orwell (1903–1950) lived and worked in Hayes, 1932–3.

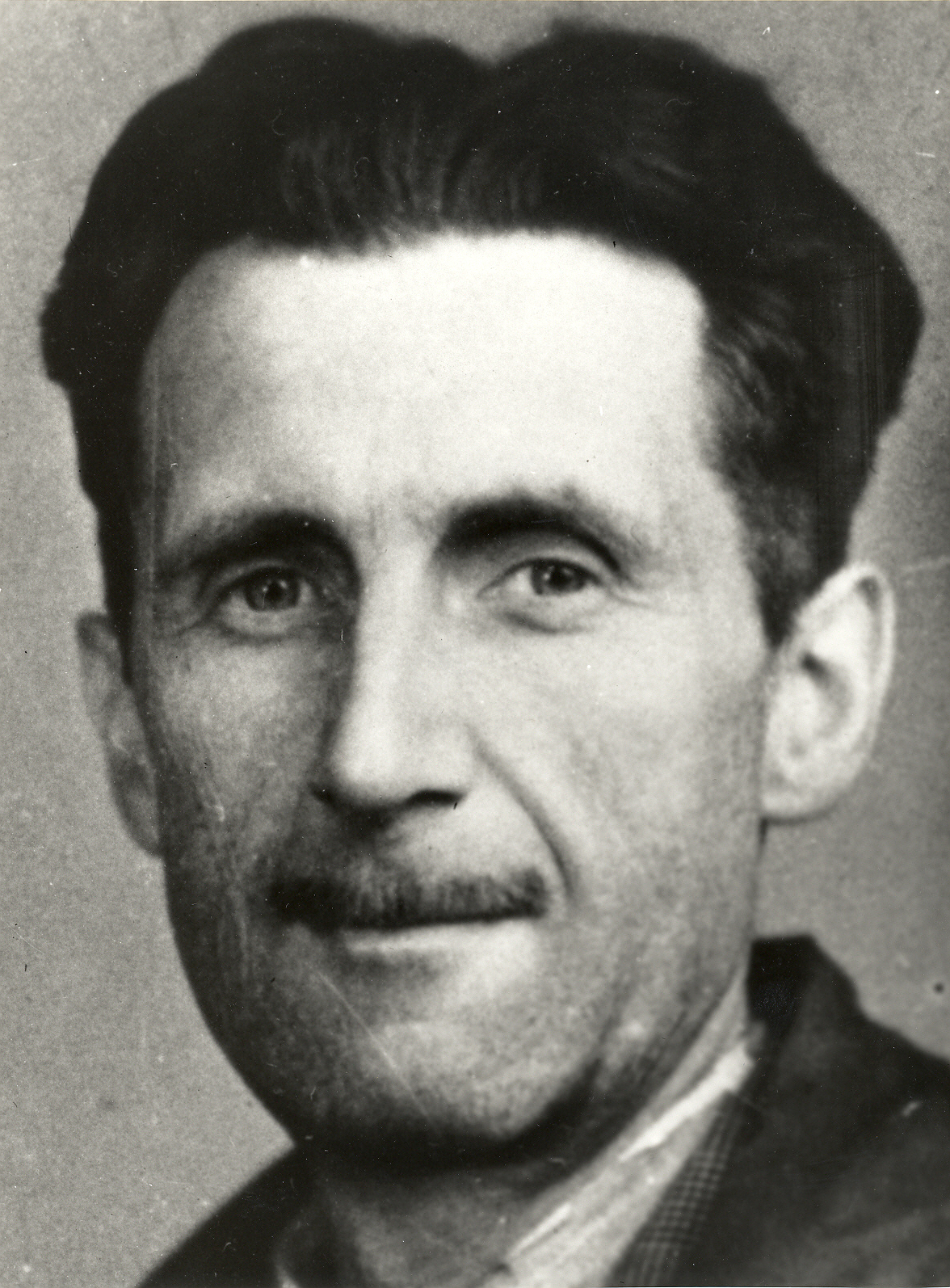
George Orwell in 1933, in which year he lived and worked in Hayes

- Malcolm Owen (1955–1980) and Paul Fox (1951–2007) of punk band The Ruts grew up in Hayes.
- Larry Page (1936–2024), 1960s manager of pop groups The Kinks and The Troggs, was born in Hayes.
- Colin Phipps (1934–2009) – geologist, Labour MP, and founding member of the SDP - was born and schooled in Hayes.
- Steve Priest (1948–2020), bass player of glam rock band Sweet, was born in Hayes.
- Jane Seymour (1951–), actress in the titular role in Dr. Quinn, Medicine Woman and Bond girl, was born in Hayes.
- Tennis player Maud Shackle (1870–1962) – twice a Wimbledon finalist, and the first ambidextrous player – was born in Hayes.
- Nick Simper (1945–), founding member of Rock band Deep Purple, lived in Hayes.
- West Ham footballer John Sissons (1945–) was born in Hayes.
- David Smart (1929–2007), co-owner of Billy Smart's Circus and Windsor Safari Park and a son of Billy Smart Sr., was born in Hayes.
- Composer Stephen Storace (1762–1796), famous in his day and a friend of Mozart, lived from the late 1780s in Wood End, Hayes. Mozart created the role of Susanna in The Marriage of Figaro (1786) for his sister, Nancy Storace (1765–1817).
- Prebendary and philanthropist Dr Thomas Triplett (1602–1670) was a schoolmaster in Hayes during the Commonwealth period (see Sir Francis Lee, above); a primary school in the area bears his name.
- David Westlake (1965–), singer/songwriter of indie band The Servants, was born in Hayes.
- Welsh international footballer Rhoys Wiggins (1987–) grew up in Hayes.
- Michael Olise (2001–), professional footballer for French national team, grew up in Hayes
- Richard Olise (2004–), professional footballer, English youth international, grew up in Hayes
- Football player/manager/pundit Ray Wilkins (1956–2018) grew up in Hayes.
- Former TUC leader Norman Willis (1933–2014) was born in Hayes.

== Royal visits ==
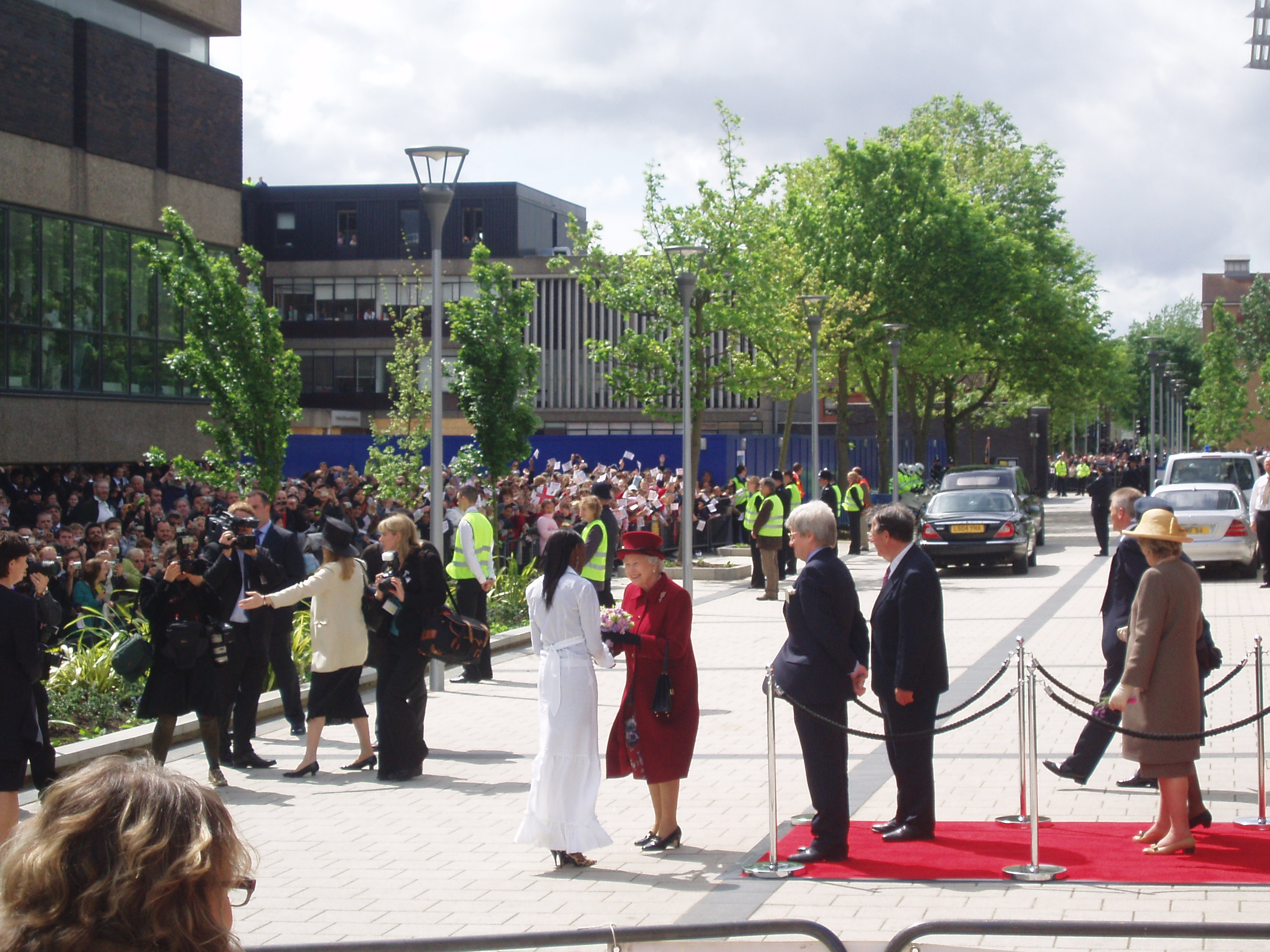
Her Majesty Queen Elizabeth II visiting nearby Brunel University before making her way to Hayes town centre, Friday 19 May 2006

In 1917, King George V and Queen Mary visited the (pre-EMI) Gramophone Company in Hayes; they were accompanied by Lord Cromer, and were received by pioneer of music-recording and cinema Alfred Clark, then managing director of the company. The Gramophone Company contributed a detailed miniature gramophone of mahogany and brass to Queen Mary's Dolls' House in 1924; it remains part of the Royal Collection.

In January 1936, the then Prince of Wales Edward visited Hayes to view the production of the Gramophone Company's radio instruments.

In 1940, King George VI and his wife Queen Elizabeth visited the EMI Factory in Hayes.

On 12 March 1965, Princess Margaret, younger sister of Queen Elizabeth II, visited the EMI factory. Her Royal Highness was accompanied by her husband Lord Snowdon. The Royal couple was received by former EMI chairman Sir Joseph Lockwood, who oversaw the company's expansion in the music industry, signing and marketing The Beatles and others.

On 19 May 2006, Queen Elizabeth II visited Hayes town centre as part of a programme of visits in celebration of her 80th birthday.

On 23 March 2011, the then Duchess of Cornwall, Camilla visited Brookside Primary School on Perth Avenue, Hayes.

On 14 February 2013, the then Prince Andrew visited TMD Technologies in Swallowfield Way, Hayes in recognition of its innovation and trade record.

On 20 April 2017, the then Duke and Duchess of Cambridge, William and Catherine and Prince Harry visited Hayes, officially opening Global Academy, whose interest in mental well-being is in accord with the Royals' Heads Together mental health charity.

On 9 March 2023, William, Prince of Wales and Catherine, Princess of Wales visited Hayes in order to thank volunteers involved in the humanitarian response to the 2023 Turkey–Syria earthquake.

== Listed buildings ==
A listed building is one that has been placed on the Statutory List of Buildings of Special Architectural or Historic Interest.

Name / location	Grade	Date listed	List entry number
Barra Hall, Wood End Green Road	II	6 September 1974	1080105
Benlow Works, Silverdale Road	II	1 February 1989	1080121
26 Park Road	II	6 September 1974	1080152
Church of St Mary, Church Road	II*	27 May 1949	1080233
Lych gate and wall to south of Church of St Mary, Church Walk	II	27 May 1949	1080234
Whitehall, 1 and 1A, Botwell Lane	II	6 September 1974	1080257
Former Manor House Stables, Church Road	II	6 September 1974	1080274
16th century walls, 30–36 (even) Church Road	II	6 September 1974	1080277
213 Church Road	II	6 September 1974	1192942
Early 16th century walls, 28 Church Road	II*	6 September 1974	1193014
Heinz Administrative Headquarters and Former Research Laboratories, Hayes Park	II*	24 November 1995	1242724
Enterprise House, Blyth Road	II	31 October 1997	1244861
Garden wall to west of Springfield House, Hayes End Road	II	6 September 1974	1285939
16th century walls, 52–58 (even) Church Road	II	6 September 1974	1286348
16th century walls, 40–50 (even) Church Road	II	6 September 1974	1358327
Botwell House, Botwell Lane	II	6 September 1974	1358357
Pringwell House and Cottage, Hayes End Road	II	6 September 1974	1358377
War Memorial, Cherry Lane Cemetery, Shepiston Lane	II	23 February 2010	1393676
The Angel PH, Uxbridge Road	II	13 February 2015	1422617
Church of St Anselm, Station Road	II	7 November 2019	1464541

=== Conservation areas ===
Hillingdon Council lists four conservation areas in Hayes. These areas are designated heritage assets of special architectural and historic interest, "the character and appearance of which is desirable to preserve or enhance.""Conservation and heritage assets". www.hillingdon.gov.uk. 22 February 2023.

- Botwell (Nestlé's), Hayes (Historic England-protected; subsequently levelled for development)
- Botwell (Thorn EMI), Hayes (Historic England-protected)
- Hayes Village
- Bulls Bridge, Hayes (Historic England-protected)

Hayes has several parks and public gardens, the character and appearance of which it may also be said to be desirable to preserve: Barra Hall Park, Minet Country Park, the Norman Leddy Memorial Gardens, and Lake Farm Country Park.

=== Related listings ===
Grade II listings are given to early 20th century electric transformer pillars bearing the town's name as part of the manufacturer's address: British Electric Transformer Company, Hayes, Middlesex. The listings are made for these reasons: "[1] Design interest: the transformer pillars produced by the British Electric Transformer Company are handsome pieces of industrial design. [2] Historic interest: . . . survives from the early period of mass electricity supply, which was to have a revolutionary effect on British domestic life."

- Historic England (14 July 1987). "Former transformer pillar at junction with Audenshaw Road, Manchester Road, Audenshaw, Tameside (1356484)". National Heritage List for England.
- Historic England (2 September 1988). "Electricity substation at junction with Sunnyside Passage, Sunnyside SW19, Merton, Greater London Authority (1358028)". National Heritage List for England.
- Historic England (12 December 1995). "Electric transformer at corner of Barnsley Road, Sheffield (1247562)". National Heritage List for England.
- Historic England (12 December 1995). "Electric transformer at corner of High Cliffe Road, Greystones Road, Sheffield (1270496)". National Heritage List for England.
- Historic England (12 December 1995). "Electric transformer at junction with Belgrave Road, Sheffield (1270888)". National Heritage List for England.
- Historic England (14 February 2006). "Cast iron electricity sub-station, Dorking Road, Reigate and Banstead, Surrey (1391489)". National Heritage List for England.
- Historic England (14 December 2010). "Electric transfomer pillar, The Glade, Reigate and Banstead, Surrey (1396381)". National Heritage List for England.

Section	Contents (click to view)
1.	Hayes: Introduction
2.	Hayes: Manors and other estates
3.	Hayes: Economic and social history
4.	Hayes: Local government
5.	Hayes: Churches
6.	Hayes: Roman Catholicism
7.	Hayes: Protestant non-conformity
8.	Hayes: Education
9.	Hayes: Charities for the poor

== Nearest places ==
Cranford, Greenford, Harlington, Hillingdon, Northolt, Southall, Uxbridge, West Drayton, Yeading, and Yiewsley.
