= Parkside Studio College =

Location
- Wood End Green Road; Hayes, Greater London, UB3 2SE; England; 51.52062°N 0.43037°W

Information
- Type: Studio school
- Established: 2012
- Department for Education URN: 138368 Tables
- Ofsted: Reports
- Gender: Coeducational
- Age: 14 to 19
- Enrolment: 116
- Website: parksidestudiocollege.co.uk

Parkside Studio College is a studio school connected with Rosedale and Hewens College in Hayes, Greater London.

Students who attend Parkside gain qualifications in key subjects such as English, Mathematics and Science. They also study Information and Communications Technology, Business Studies and one of six specialist pathways.

Parkside places emphasis on a practical approach: students work on placement in their elected pathway area and are taught to develop employability skills.

== Standards ==
In 2017 the school was judged by Ofsted as Requiring Improvement.
