= Beck Theatre =

Theatre in Hayes, London, England

The Beck Theatre
- Alfred Beck Theatre
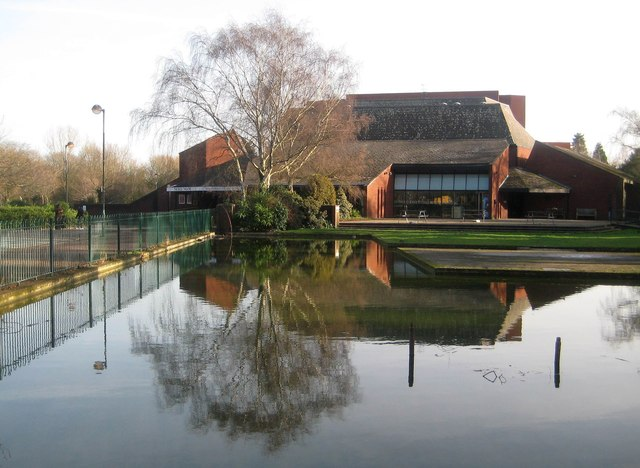
- Interactive map of The Beck Theatre
- Address: Grange Road, Hayes UB3 2UE; London; United Kingdom
- Coordinates: 51.5215°N 0.4234°W
- Owner: Trafalgar Entertainment
- Capacity: 600
- Type: Provincial
- Parking: Free on-site car park

Construction
- Opened: 1977

Website
- www.becktheatre.org.uk Hayes, The Beck Theatre.jpg

The Beck Theatre is a 600-seat theatre in Hayes, in the London Borough of Hillingdon. It was built in 1977 at a cost of £2.5 million.

== Type ==
The Beck is a community theatre, offering one-night concerts, drama, comedy, dance, musicals, children's shows, films, opera, pantomime, and a children's summer project.

== History ==
The Beck Theatre was built in 1977 by Hillingdon Borough Council, with a bequest from Councillor Alfred Beck. It was purpose-built as a community-focused theatre, and is set in a parkland aspect adjoining a botanical garden (the Norman Leddy Memorial Gardens).

The Beck was one of forty buildings considered for the Royal Institute of British Architects London region award in 1978, and in 2004 won an Access Award from Hillingdon Council for its resources for disabled and elderly people.

A fund shortage threatened the theatre's future in 1984, when it was saved by a local petition. It was taken over in 1986 by impresario Charles Vance. The management contract passed then to Hetherington Seelig, followed by Apollo Leisure in 1992 (later bought out by Clear Channel Entertainment). In 2006, the Beck reverted to Hetherington Seelig in a partnership with Qdos Entertainment called HQ Theatres, which continued to run the theatre on behalf of the local council until March 2021, when HQ Theatres was acquired by Trafalgar Entertainment, who now run the theatre.

In June 1991, the theatre was the scene of an attempted IRA bombing, before a performance by the Blues and Royals band.

In early 2024 the future of Beck came under threat of closure again after the contract between Hillingdon Council and Trafalgar Theatres ended which led to disputes and arguments between the council and Trafalgar Theatres and several protests organised by the Back The Beck team, later in 2024 Trafalgar Theatres walked away from negotiations with the council and specialist theatre consultants were brought in to find a new operator to run the Beck Theatre in early December 2024 Parkwood Theatre were appointed to run the Beck Theatre with the contract still in the negotiation phase. As of December 2025 the contract is still yet to be signed by Parkwood Theatre and Hillingdon Council.

From June 1998 until July 1999 New York Times #1 bestseller Tony Lee worked at the theatre as their Marketing Manager.

== Artists ==
The following is a selective list of artists to have performed at the Beck:

- Ian Anderson of Jethro Tull
- Colin Blunstone & Rod Argent (15 Jun 2000)
- Marcus Brigstocke
- Brotherhood of Man (7 Sep 2012)
- The Drifters
- Errol Brown of Hot Chocolate
- Jimmy Carr
- Frank Carson
- Chas & Dave
- Alan Davies
- Jack Dee
- Donovan (10 Jun 2005)
- Fairport Convention
- Georgie Fame (20 Nov 2003)
- Giovanni Pernice
- Guz Khan
- Foster & Allen
- The Fureys & Davey Arthur
- Billy Fury (who gave his final concert here in 1982)
- Hinge and Bracket (5 Apr 1999)
- The Hollies
- Roy Hudd
- Rhod Gilbert
- Jethro
- Jimmy Jones
- Danny La Rue (31 May 1999)
- Sean Lock
- Dennis Locorriere of Dr Hook (12 Mar 1999)
- Joe Longthorne
- Lee Mack
- Bernard Manning
- Les McKeown's Bay City Rollers (14 Mar 2010)
- Jacqui McShee's Pentangle (1 Nov 2000)
- Lulu
- Paul Merton
- Paul Chowdhry
- The Osmonds (22 Sep 2014)
- Ralph McTell (24 Oct 2000)
- Russell Brand
- Gilbert O'Sullivan (13 Jun 1998)
- Marti Pellow
- Mickey Rooney (26 Sep 2007)
- Sara Pascoe
- Sarah Millican
- Showaddywaddy
- Sindhu Vee
- Frank Skinner
- Freddie Starr
- Steeleye Span
- Suggs of Madness
- Bobby Vee (24 Nov 2005)
- Barbara Windsor
- Bill Wyman's Rhythm Kings (25 May 2000)
- Marshall Hain (8 October 1978)

== Transport ==
=== Buses ===
The 90, 195, 278, 427, SL8, H98 and U7 buses all stop at the Beck Theatre. Alight at the traffic lights at the junction of Uxbridge Road and Grange Road.

=== Train ===
The closest train station is Hayes & Harlington, which is approximately 1 1/4 miles (2.0 km) away. The 90, 278, 195 and H98 buses connect Hayes and Harlington Station and the Beck Theatre.

=== Tube ===
Uxbridge is the closest London Underground station. The 427, SL8 and U7 buses connect Uxbridge station and the Beck Theatre.
