= Locallife =

Locallife is an on-line directory that represents local communities in multiple countries. Locallife hosts local maps and directions, special coupon offers and hyperlinks to business websites.

== History and spread ==
Locallife began in the United Kingdom in August 1999. The company continued to expand throughout the UK both physically and on the Internet. Locallife launched the first franchise in autumn of 2004. In 2008, the first location for Locallife USA was established at SkySong in Scottsdale, Arizona. Locallife spread across the United States, France, and New Zealand. In the United States, Locallife directories represent over 12 million businesses. Locallife hosts approximately 320 local community online directories in the United Kingdom, 380 in France, and more in New Zealand. This service has since closed down, as confirmed by a local New Zealand web agency. All of the URL links now redirect to random sites that are no longer affiliated with the original intent.

== Locallife for users ==
Locallife is a network of sites that constitutes a guide for both visitors and residents of a particular area. On local sites, users browse menus of restaurants, retailers, contractors, professional services, details of schools, and much more. The individual Locallife sites are identical in design and layout. Locallife websites are organized into nine main categories, which are color-coded for clarity and ease of use.
