= Anguwar Jakada =

Jakada, Gombe, Nigeria Anguwar Jakada
- county
- Nickname: Kwanar Alheri
- Country: Nigeria
- State: Gombe State

Area
  - Total: 16 km^{2} (6.2 sq mi)

Population (2022)
  - Total: 2,520
  - Density: 160/km^{2} (410/sq mi)
- Time zone: UTC+1 (WAT)
- Postal code: 760222

Anguwar Jakada is a district in the Gombe metropolis. It is one of the fastest-growing districts in the Gombe metropolis and the seat of the 301 Artillery Regiment Headquarters Gombe.
