= Mellow Lane School =

Location
- Hewens Road; Hayes, Greater London, UB4 8JP; England; 51.5285°N 0.4395°W

Information
- Type: Comprehensive school
- Motto: Perseverando Vinces
- Established: 1938
- Status: Closed
- Closed: 2011
- Local authority: Hillingdon
- Ofsted: Reports
- Gender: Mixed
- Age: 11 to 18
- Houses: Dower, Manor, Park, Round

Mellow Lane School was a comprehensive school, located in Hayes, in the London Borough of Hillingdon, Middlesex. It closed in 2011 and reopened in August of that year, as Hewens College.

== History ==
The school was opened in 1938. It housed two departments, run as separate entities: the Mellow Lane Senior Boys' School and the Mellow Lane Senior Girls' School.

In 1948, Mellow Lane was established as a co-educational comprehensive school. It was then one of only two experimental comprehensives in the UK permitted by the UK Government. It was a grant-maintained school between 1 April 1992 and 31 August 1999, and became a foundation secondary comprehensive school on 1 September 1999.

The architects of the building were Curtis and Burchett. The building was extended in 1949 and 1963.

== Houses ==
There were four houses during much of the school's existence: Dower, which was red; Manor, which was blue; Park, which was green; and Round, which was yellow. These were named after local manor houses.

== Notable alumni ==
- Parmjit Dhanda (born 1971) — MP for Gloucester
- Anne-Marie Duff (born 1970) — British actress
- Ray Iles (born 1963) — scientist, academic, entrepreneur
- Dame Cleo Laine DBE (born 1927) — jazz and pop singer
- Steve Priest (born 1948) — bass guitarist, member of the group The Sweet
- John Sissons (born 1945) — footballer
- Rhoys Wiggins (born 1987) — Welsh international footballer
- Guy Butters (born 1969) – Professional footballer.
