= Norman Leddy Memorial Gardens =

Park in Hayes, London, England

Coordinates: 51.5205°N 0.4230°W

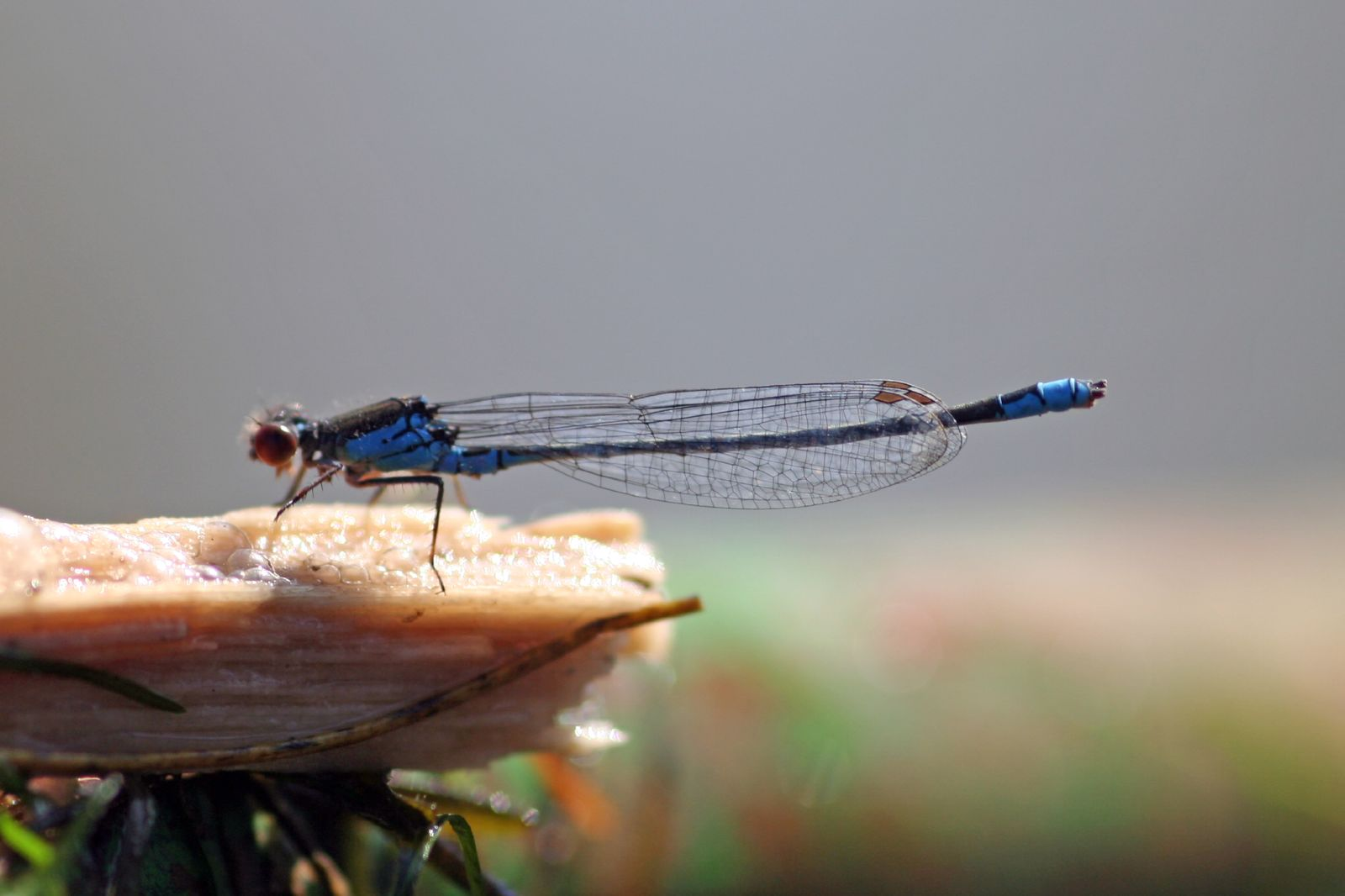
- Small red-eyed damselfly
- Interactive map of Norman Leddy Memorial Gardens
- Type: Public park
- Location: Hayes, Hillingdon, Greater London
- Created: 1993
- Operator: London Borough of Hillingdon
- Status: Open year round

The Norman Leddy Memorial Gardens in Hayes, in London, United Kingdom, is one of Hillingdon Borough's designated gardens of excellence. In September 2010, the Gardens earned a gold award for Best London Small Park in the London in Bloom competition.

The Gardens, which covers 1.5 hectares (3.7 acres), is situated about 200 metres (220 yd) south of the Uxbridge Road, at its junction with Grange Road.

There are four entrances to the Gardens. The main one is situated at the southern end of the site in Wood End, and gives access into the main part of the Gardens.

== History ==
The Norman Leddy Memorial Gardens was originally a private residence with a large ornamental garden surrounding the house. A walled vegetable and fruit garden was attached to the Gardens on the west side of the site. In the early 1900s the house and grounds became a private nursing home. When the home closed, the house and grounds were given to Hayes and Harlington Urban District Council, which became part of the London Borough of Hillingdon in 1965.

The site was used as the headquarters of the Parks Department until 1960, when the building was condemned as unsafe. The building was demolished in 1961 and the site was developed into the Hayes Botanic Gardens. The walled vegetable and fruit garden became the council's tree and shrub nursery; it was lost to the site in 1975 as part of a road improvement scheme.

In 1993, Hayes Botanic Gardens was renamed the Norman Leddy Memorial Gardens in memory of a late assistant director of parks who had done much over a period of years to develop the Gardens.

== Flora and fauna ==
The gardens are laid out in formal style, with a wide range of trees, shrubs, herbaceous perennials and bulbs, providing colour and interest throughout the year.

Areas important for wildlife are the bog and ditch, bed ponds, garden pond, shrubs and woodland areas. The ponds accommodate amphibians and insect larvae. Hillingdon Borough Council report sightings of a rare damselfly in a pond in the surrounding open space of St Marys', Wood End, of which the Gardens are a part. The council claims, too, the first sightings ever of small red-eyed damselflies in Hillingdon at the ornamental pond of the Beck Theatre.

Seasonal ditches support interesting invertebrates. Insects provide food for birds and bats. There is a variety of shelter for birds, and coots nest by an artificial pond alongside gipsywort (Lycopus europaeus) and brooklime (Veronica beccabunga). The Gardens has areas with a different cutting regime, in that they are not cut until late summer. This allows flowering plants to set seed and grow, which, in turn, provides habitat for native species including small mammals.

== Facilities and features ==
The peaceful and tranquil nature of the Gardens has made it a popular location for the planting of commemorative trees and shrubs. There is a well-used network of paths, most of which form part of Hillingdon Borough's Access Trails, which are walks for disabled people. The infrastructure of the Gardens allows circular and linear walks for people of all ages and abilities.

== Art ==
The Gardens features a tree sculpture titled Night Scene by Tom "Carver" Harvey.

== Transport ==
=== Buses ===
The 427, 607, H98 and U7 buses all use the Uxbridge Road. Alight at the traffic lights at the junction of Uxbridge Road and Grange Road, which is 200 metres from the Gardens.

=== Train ===
The closest train station is Hayes and Harlington, which is approximately 2 km away. The H98 bus connects Hayes and Harlington Station and the Gardens.

=== Car ===
Parking is available on Wood End by the main entrance.
