= Hanifan =

Hanifan is a surname. Notable people with the surname include:

- Jim Hanifan (1933–2020), American football coach and player
- L. J. Hanifan (1879–1932), American economist
