= Park Tower Knightsbridge Hotel =

Hotel in London

The Park Tower Knightsbridge Hotel
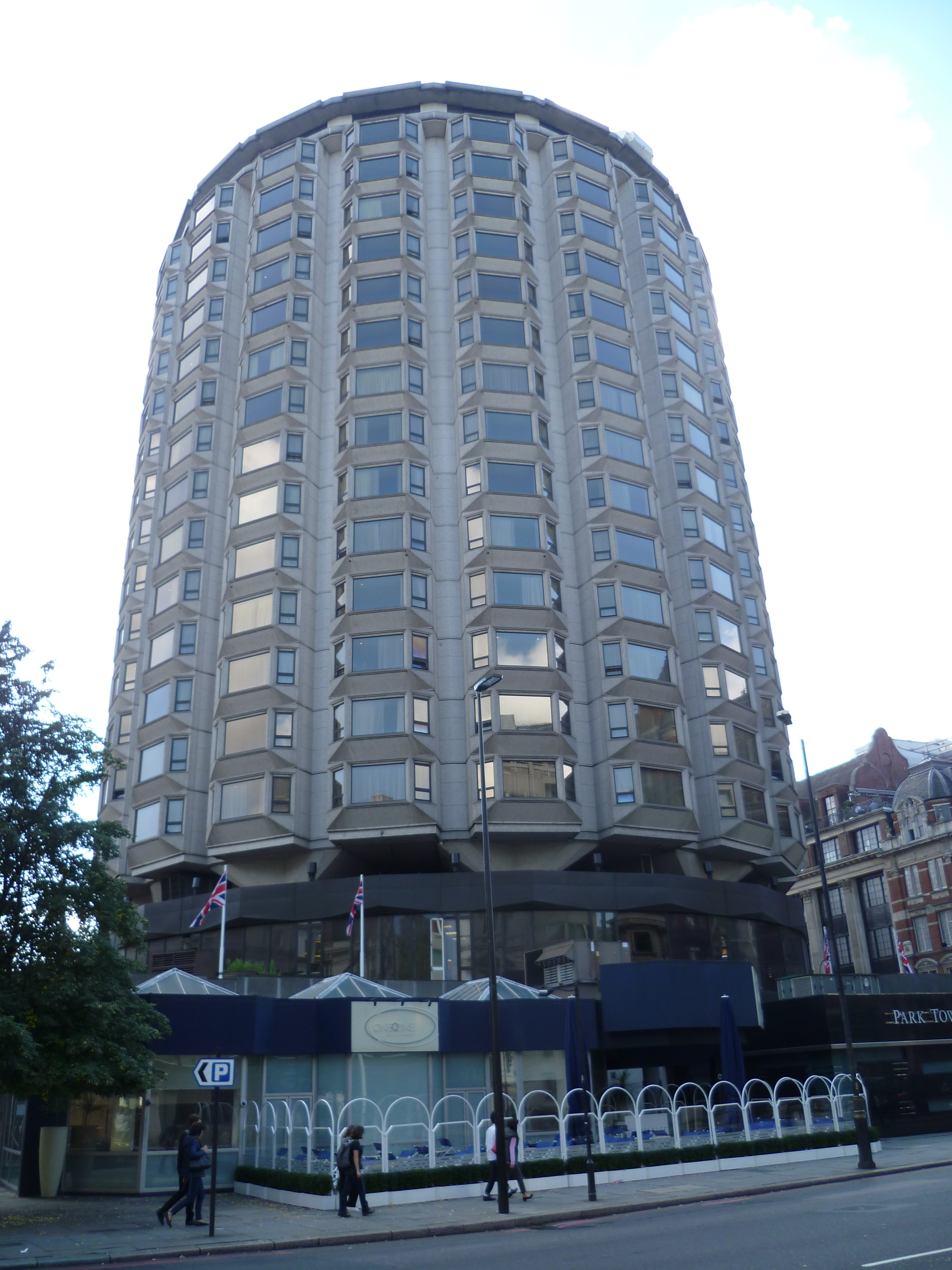

- Location within Central London

General information
- Location: 101 Knightsbridge, London, England, United Kingdom
- Coordinates: 51.5016°N 0.1588°W
- Opened: 1973
- Owner: Mahdi Al Tajir
- Operator: Marriott International

Design and construction
- Architect: Richard Seifert
- Developer: Park Tower Hotel Ltd.

Website
- www.marriott.com/hotels/travel/lonlc-the-park-tower-knightsbridge-a-luxury-collection-hotel-london/

The Park Tower Knightsbridge Hotel is a luxury 5-star hotel in London, England. It is situated at 101 Knightsbridge near Hyde Park, in the Belgravian district of the Royal Borough of Kensington and Chelsea.

== History ==
The hotel was designed by Richard Seifert and was officially opened on 21 June 1973 as the Park Tower Hotel by Prime Minister Edward Heath. It has a close similarity to the tower of Elmbank Gardens, an office block in Glasgow which Seifert's practice designed around the same period. The Park Tower, along with the Skyline Hotel at Heathrow Airport, was developed by Capital & Counties and both properties were operated by Canadian-based Skyline Hotels. Sheraton Hotels acquired the management contract for both hotels from Skyline Hotels on 14 May 1977, and the hotel was renamed the Sheraton Park Tower.

When Starwood acquired Sheraton, they moved the hotel from their Sheraton division to The Luxury Collection, but somewhat confusingly kept the Sheraton name on the hotel for many years. The hotel was finally renamed in 2013, for its 40th anniversary, becoming The Park Tower Knightsbridge. It is owned by Mahdi Al Tajir, an Emirati businessman and former diplomat.

The Grosvenor Casino is located inside The Park Tower.
