= Rosedale College =

Location
- Wood End Green Road; Hayes, Greater London, UB3 2SE; England
- 51.52031°N 0.42914°W

Information
- Type: Academy
- Department for Education URN: 137077 Tables
- Ofsted: Reports
- Head teacher: Belishia Visser
- Gender: Mixed
- Age: 11 to 19
- Enrolment: 658 as of January 2016
- Website: http://www.rosedalecollege.co.uk/

Rosedale College is a mixed secondary school and sixth form located in the Hayes area of the London Borough of Hillingdon, England. The school was first established as Hayes County Grammar School and then became Hayes Manor School before being renamed Rosedale College.

The school converted to academy status on 1 August 2011 as a partnership with Hewens College. Previously Rosedale College was a Foundation School administered by Hillingdon London Borough Council. The school continues to coordinate with Hillingdon London Borough Council for admissions.

Rosedale College specialises in technology and applied learning, and has additional resources for the specialisms including a dedicated building where technology, IT, science and mathematics are taught. Other facilities at the school include a floodlit synthetic pitch and a separate sixth form centre.

== Notable former pupils ==
- Greg Dyke, media executive and chair of the Football Association, attended Hayes Grammar School
- Tony Lee, New York Times #1 Bestseller author and graphic novelist, attended Hayes Manor between 1981 and 1987

== Notable former staff ==
- Chris Corcoran, comedian and broadcaster
