= Sheraton Skyline Hotel London Heathrow =

Hotel in London

Coordinates: 51.48153°N 0.4366°W

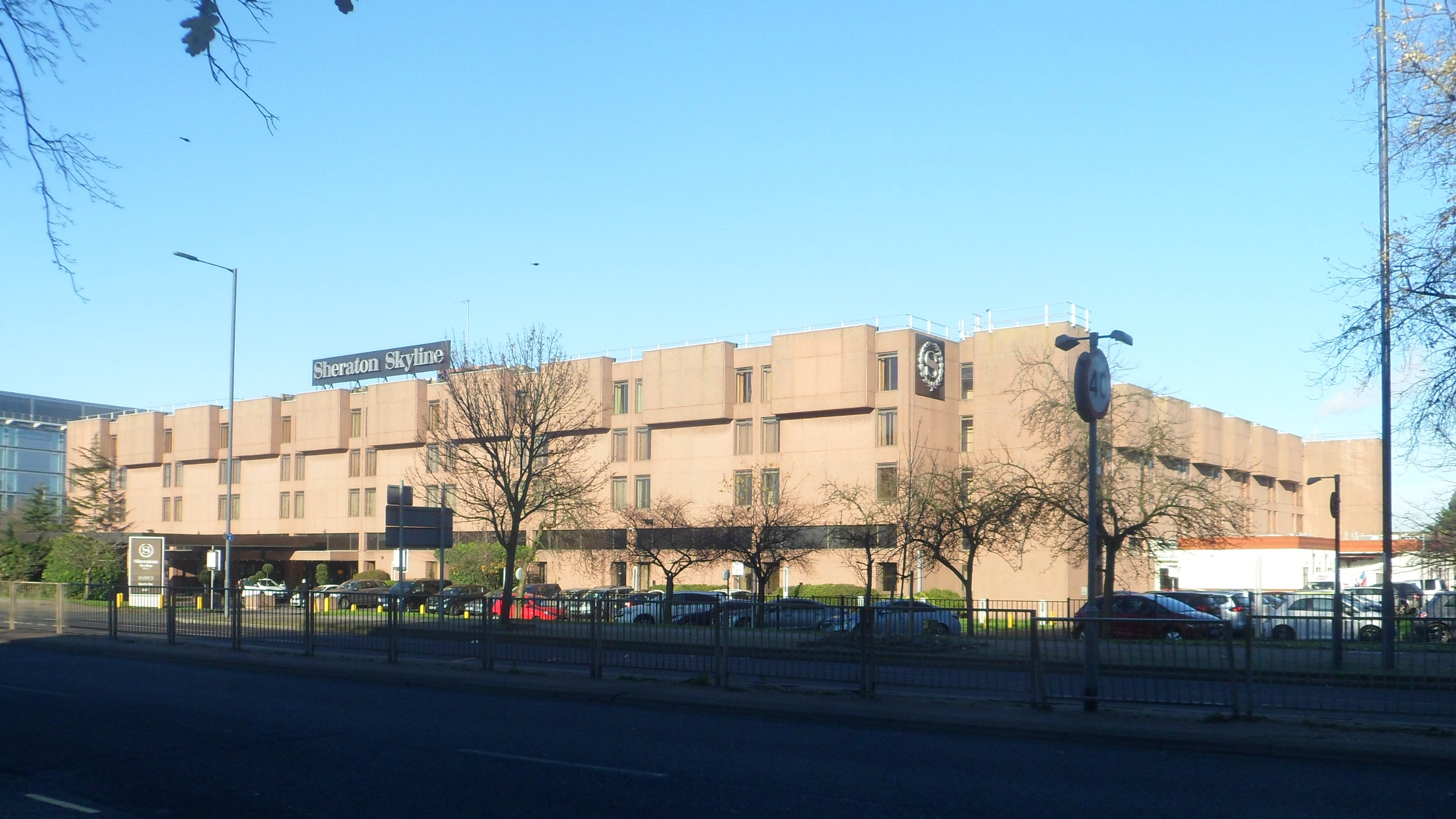
- The hotel in 2014

General information
- Location: Hayes, Hillingdon, London, United Kingdom
- Opening: 1 October 1971
- Closed: 22 May 2026
- Operator: Sheraton Hotels

Other information
- Number of rooms: 350

Website
- Official Website

The Sheraton Skyline Hotel London Heathrow is a 4-star, 350-room hotel, built in 1971, near Heathrow Airport in the town of Hayes, in the London Borough of Hillingdon, England. The hotel closed on 22 May 2026.

== History ==
The Skyline Hotel was designed in the brutalist style by the Ronald Fielding Partnership, with interiors by Canadian designer Allan W. Edwards. The Skyline Hotel, along with the Park Tower Hotel in Knightsbridge, was developed by Capital & Counties and both properties were operated by Canadian-based Skyline Hotels. The Skyline Hotel opened on 1 October 1971, with a single room price of £6 and double-rooms priced at £9. That same year the hotel formed part of a group called the London Heathrow Conference Service with most of the major hotels in the area, to specifically target business travelers and "become the business meeting centre of Europe". From the outset the hotel became known for hosting numerous international business conferences. On 9 March 1977, the "Transport of hazardous cargoes by air" conference was held at the hotel. During the 1970s, entertainment at the hotel included Diamond Lil's Wild West Cabaret, which ran up to six nights a week, and the house band The Banjo Boys.

Sheraton Hotels acquired the management contract for the Skyline Hotel and the Park Tower from Skyline Hotels for a combined £4 million on 14 May 1977, and the hotel was renamed the Sheraton Skyline Hotel. In 1980 the Turkish Cypriot business community met at the hotel to discuss trade and investment between Turkey and the UK.

In 1981, John Rotter was appointed controller of the Sheraton Management Corporation and controller of the Sheraton Skyline Hotel. In 1988, Swedish property development consortium Reinhold Int bought the hotel for nearly £40 million.

At the end of 1996, the hotel completed the Department of National Heritage's certification in the Investors in People Program, which rates the performance of employers in the hospitality industry. The certification marks employers who have high training and incentive programs for employees in one of Britain's fasted-growing employment sectors. The Sheraton Skyline was one of the venues for the first four days of the Congress in London, held between 4 and 11 July 1997. For a period it was known as the Sheraton Skyline Hotel and Conference Centre.

In May 2002, hundreds of people were evacuated from the hotel by fire services, after it was reported that guests could smell ammonia.

The hotel was purchased in 2015 by Qatar Airways. It was announced that the hotel would be renamed Oryx Sheraton Skyline London Heathrow, the first hotel to be branded under the airline's Oryx brand. However the name change was never carried out.

The hotel closed on 22 May 2026.

== Architecture and facilities ==
The Sheraton Skyline was built in 1971 by Curtis and Davies and designed by Ronald Fielding. The hotel is noted for its "atrium design". The hotel features 350 rooms.

The hotel has several restaurants including Madhu's Heathrow, Sports Bar & Grill and the Sky Bar, which serves cocktails. The menu at Madhu's Heathrow features Punjabi cuisine, based on recipes from the original Madhu Indian Restaurant, located in Southall, West London. It is the first branch of the 33-year-old establishment. It previously had a Mediterranean restaurant called The Garden, which overlooked the hotel's swimming pool. A 1983 article in The Law Society's Gazette stated: "An earthly paradise appears in the shape of the Sheraton Skyline Hotel at Heathrow, where the chef, Uwe Zander, has a fantastic number of awards".
