= Thomas Triplett =

English churchman and teacher

Thomas Triplett (1602–1670) was an English churchman and teacher, a Canon at Westminster Abbey from 1662 and by his death in 1670 Sub-Dean there. Triplett was a schoolmaster in Hayes, Middlesex during the Commonwealth period, when cathedrals and canonries were abolished; there is a school in Hayes named after him.

== Early life ==
Thomas Triplett was christened on 6 April 1602, at St Nicholas Cole Abbey, London (near St Paul's Cathedral), the son of Robert Triplett, Master of the Stationers Company of London, and Margery (Cartwright). Triplett was educated at St Paul's School, London and Christ Church, Oxford where he graduated M.A. in 1625.

== Early career ==
In the 1630s Triplett was rector of various parishes in County Durham in the north of England, including Washington (where George Washington's ancestors originated). He was appointed to a canonry at York in 1641, another at Salisbury in 1645, and yet another at Durham in 1648 or 1649.

== Commonwealth period and after ==
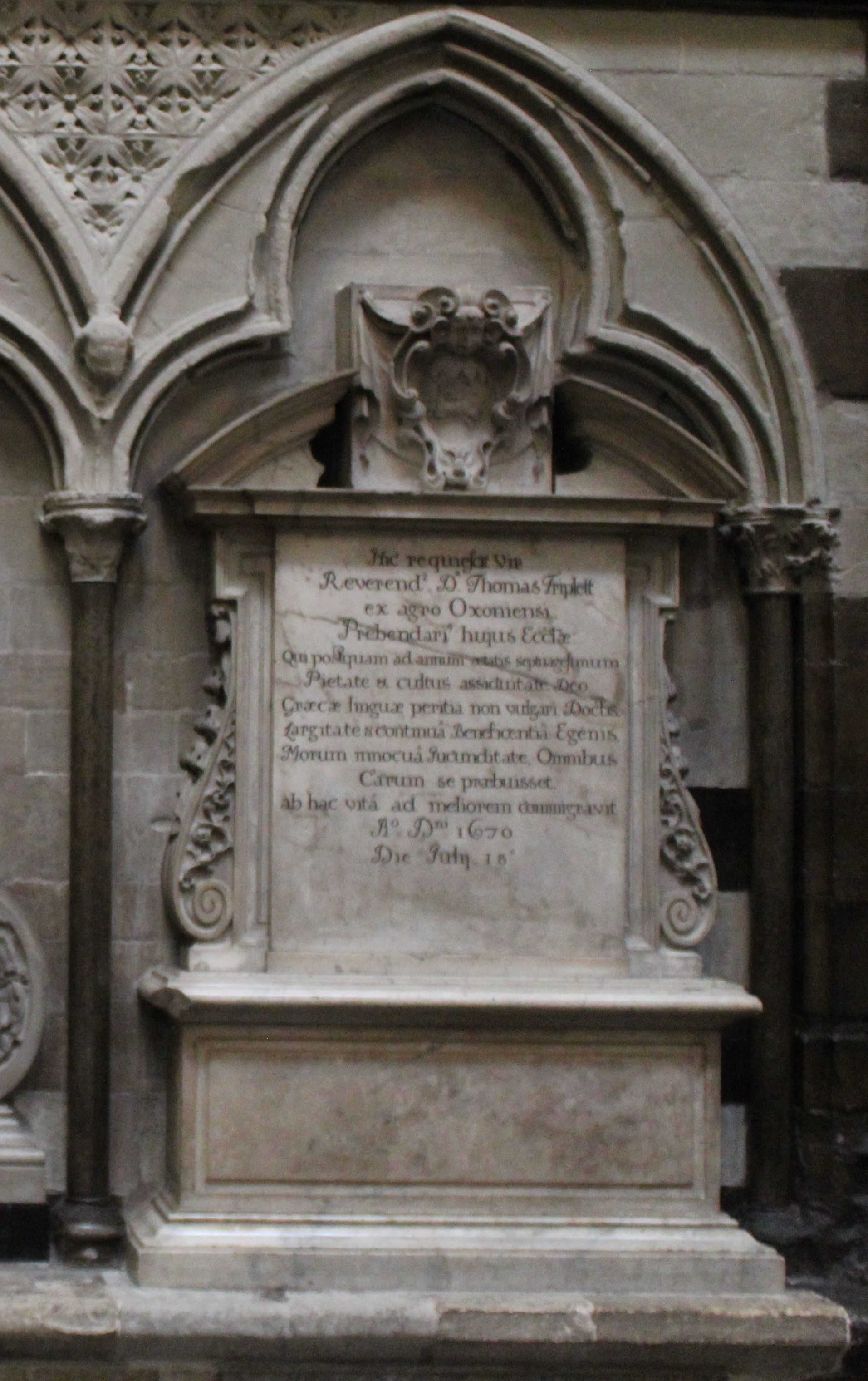
Triplett's memorial in Westminster Abbey

Triplett's career was interrupted by the English Civil War and the Commonwealth period, when cathedrals and canonries were abolished. He had to earn his living as a schoolmaster, first in Dublin, and then in Hayes, Middlesex, where there remains a school named after him, Dr Triplett's. When King Charles II was restored to the throne in 1660 cathedrals were re-established, and in 1662 Triplett was made a Canon of Westminster Abbey. By his death in 1670 he was Sub-Dean.

== Death ==
Triplett does not appear to have been married. Most of his estate at his death was left to his sister Katherine Warne and her three children, then living in Ireland. He founded two charities: one to help apprentices from Washington and nearby places in County Durham; the other to help apprentices from Hayes in Middlesex, Petersham and Richmond, and scholars at Westminster School. Both these charities still exist. In his will he mentioned his relatives in Oxfordshire: cousin Christopher and his brother Richard Triplett; Henry Triplett, son of Paul; and another cousin, Ralph Triplett. His large collection of books left to various people show he must have been a scholar, though no writings are known. Several books with his signature are in the library at Westminster Abbey - he signed his name Triplet.

Triplett is buried in Poets' Corner at Westminster Abbey. His white marble monument is on the west wall of the South Transept. At the top of the monument is a carving (uncoloured) of his coat of arms: a hind courant, pierced through the neck with an arrow, a chief indented (see Heraldry). His Latin epitaph can be translated as follows:

Here rests the Reverend Doctor Thomas Triplett, of the county of Oxford, prebendary of this church: who, right through to his seventieth year of age, made himself dear to God by his piety and constant devotion; to the Learned, by his uncommon skill in the Greek language; to the Poor, by his generosity and continual good works; and to All, by the innocent charm of his character; and finally passed from this life to a better one, on the 18th of July A.D. 1670.
