= Reid baronets of Barra =

Escutcheon of the Reid baronets of Barra

The Reid baronetcy, of Barra in the County of Aberdeen, was created in the Baronetage of Nova Scotia on 30 November 1703 for John Reid. The 2nd Baronet represented Elgin Burghs in the House of Commons between 1710 and 1713.

The title became extinct on the death of the 7th Baronet in 1885.

== Reid baronets, of Barra (1703) ==
- Sir John Reid, 1st Baronet (died after 1722)
- Sir Alexander Reid, 2nd Baronet (died 1750)
- Sir James Reid, 3rd Baronet (died c. 1772)
- Sir John Reid, 4th Baronet (1760–1829)
- Sir John Reid, 5th Baronet (1794–1844)
- Sir William Reid, 6th Baronet (1795–1845)
- Sir Alexander Reid, 7th Baronet (1798–1885)
