= Hewens College =

Location
- Hewens Road; Hayes, Greater London, UB4 8JP; England
- Coordinates: 51.5285°N 0.4395°W

Information
- Type: Academy
- Motto: Hewens SPIRIT
- Department for Education URN: 137078 Tables
- Ofsted: Reports
- Chair: Marie Ashley
- Head teacher: Marlene Littlefair
- Gender: Coeducational
- Age: 11 to 18
- Enrolment: 321
- Capacity: 400

Hewens College (formerly Mellow Lane School) is a secondary school with academy status in Hayes, Hillingdon. It is part of the Rosedale Hewens Academy Trust The school caters for years 7–13, teaching KS3, KS4 and A Level.

== Inspection judgements ==
Hewens College was inspected by Ofsted in 2012 and judged as 2 (Good). It was inspected again in 2015 and again judged Good.

== The school in the news ==
In 2017 a Guardian investigation showed that the number of children in the GCSE cohort in 2015 had fallen by 46% from the number in that year group when they entered the school in year 7. Education Datalab reported that, had the GCSE results of the children who left Hewens College been included in the Hewens College results, these would have been 16% lower for pupils achieving five GCSEs at grades A*-C including English and maths.

== Notable former pupils ==
- Atena Ghaibi, British Journalist and Presenter
- Parmjit Dhanda, MP for Gloucester
- Welsh international footballer Rhoys Wiggins
- John Sissons (footballer)
- Anne-Marie Duff, British Actress
