= Local community =

Term describing people living in a common location

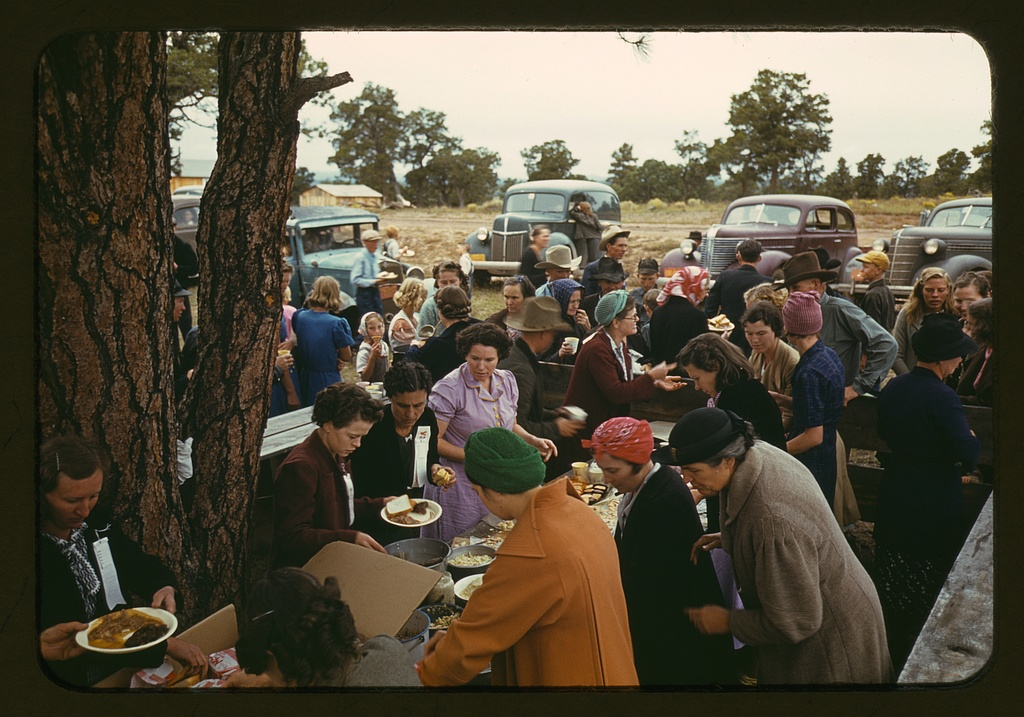
Community gathering in Pie Town, New Mexico in October 1940

A local community has been defined as a group of interacting people living in a common location. The word is often used to refer to a group that is organized around common values and is attributed with social cohesion within a shared geographical location, generally in social units larger than a household. The word can also refer to the national community or global community.

The word "community" is derived from the Old French communité which is derived from the Latin communitas (cum, "with/together" and munus, "gift"), a broad term for fellowship or organized society.

A sense of community refers to people's perception of interconnection and interdependence, shared responsibility, and common goals.

Understanding a community entails having knowledge of community needs and resources, having respect for community members, and involving key community members in programs.

== Benefits of local community ==
The author Robert Putnam refers to the value which comes from social networks as social capital in his book Bowling Alone: The Collapse and Revival of American Community. He writes that social capital "makes an enormous difference in our lives", that "a society characterized by generalized reciprocity is more efficient that a distrustful society" and that economic sociologists have shown a minimized economic wealth if social capital is lacking.

Putnam reports that the first use of the social capital theory was by L. J. Hanifan, a practical reformer during the Progressive Era in the United States of America. The following description of social capital is a quote from L.J. Hanifan in Putnam's Book:

Those tangible substances [that] count for most in the daily lives of people: namely good will, fellowship, sympathy, and social intercourse among individuals and families who make up a social unit…. The individual is helpless socially, if left to himself…. If he comes into contact with neighbor, and they with other neighbors, there will be an accumulation of social capital, which may immediately satisfy his social needs and which may bear a social potentiality sufficient to the substantial improvement of living conditions in the whole community. The community as a whole will benefit by the cooperation of all its parts, while the individual will find in his associations the advantages of the help, sympathy, and fellowship of his neighbors.

Employment

Putnam reported that many studies have shown that the highest predictor of job satisfaction is the presence of social connection in the workplace. He writes that "people with friends at work are happier at work." And that "social networks provide people with advice, a bonus, a promotion, and other strategic information, and letters of recommendation."

Community engagement has been proven to counteract the most negative attributes of poverty and a high amount of social capital has been shown to reduce crime.

Local community and health

"Social connectedness matters to our lives in the most profound way." -Robert Putnam.

Robert Putnam reports, in the chapter Health and Happiness from his book Bowling Alone, that recent public research shows social connection impacts all areas of human health, this includes psychological and physical aspects of human health. Putnam says "...beyond a doubt that social connectedness is one of the most powerful determinates of our well being." In particular it is face to face connections which have been shown to have greater impacts then non-face to face relationships.

Specific health benefits of strong social relationships are a decrease in the likelihood of: seasonal viruses, heart attacks, strokes, cancer, depression, and premature death of all sorts.

Online initiatives

There are online initiatives to improve local communities like LOCAL (www.localchange.com).

== Community sustainability ==
Sustainability in community programs is the capacity of programs (services designed to meet the needs of community members) to continuously respond to community issues.

A sustained program maintains a focus consonant with its original goals and objectives, including the individuals, families, and communities it was originally intended to serve. Programs change regarding the breadth and depth of their programming. Some become aligned with other organizations and established institutions, whereas others maintain their independence. Understanding the community context in which programs serving the community function has an important influence on program sustainability and success. See table:

Sustainability elements→	Middle-range program results→	Ultimate result
Leadership competence. Effective collaboration. Understanding the community. Demonstrating program results. Strategic funding. Staff involvement and integration. Program responsivity.	Participant needs met. Confidence in program survival. Effective sustainability planning.	Sustainability.

== Local economy ==
According to Washington state's Sustain South Sound organization, the top ten reasons to buy locally are:

1. To strengthen local economy: Studies have shown that buying from an independent, locally owned business, significantly raises the number of times your money is used to make purchases from other local businesses, service providers and farms—continuing to strengthen the economic base of the community.
2. Increase jobs: Small local businesses are the largest employer nationally in the United States of America.
3. Encourage local prosperity: A growing body of economic research shows that in an increasingly homogenized world, entrepreneurs and skilled workers are more likely to invest and settle in communities that preserve their one-of-a-kind businesses and distinctive character.
4. Reduce environmental impact: Locally owned businesses can make more local purchases requiring less transportation and generally set up shop in town or city centers as opposed to developing on the fringe. This means contributing less to greenhouse gas emissions, sprawl, congestion, habitat loss and pollution.
5. Support community groups: Non-profit organizations receive an average 250% more support from smaller business owners than they do from large businesses.
6. Keep your community unique: Where we shop, where we eat and have fun—all of it makes our community home.
7. Get better service: Local businesses often hire people with a better understanding of the products they are selling and take more time to get to know customers.
8. Invest in community: Local businesses are owned by people who live in the community, are less likely to leave, and are more invested in the community's future.
9. Put your taxes to good use: Local businesses in town centers require comparatively little infrastructure investment and make more efficient use of public services as compared to nationally owned stores entering the community.
10. Buy what you want, not what someone wants you to buy: A marketplace of tens of thousands of small businesses is the best way to ensure innovation and low prices over the long-term. A multitude of small businesses, each selecting products based not on a national sales plan but on their own interests and the needs of their local customers, guarantees a much broader range of product choices.

== Suggested reading ==
- A Guide to Community Visioning; Hands-On Information For Local Communities. Oregon Visions Project.

== See also ==
- Local history
- Local museum
- Local purchasing
