= Portsmouth War Memorial =

Memorial in Portsmouth, Hampshire, England

City of Portsmouth War Memorial
- United Kingdom
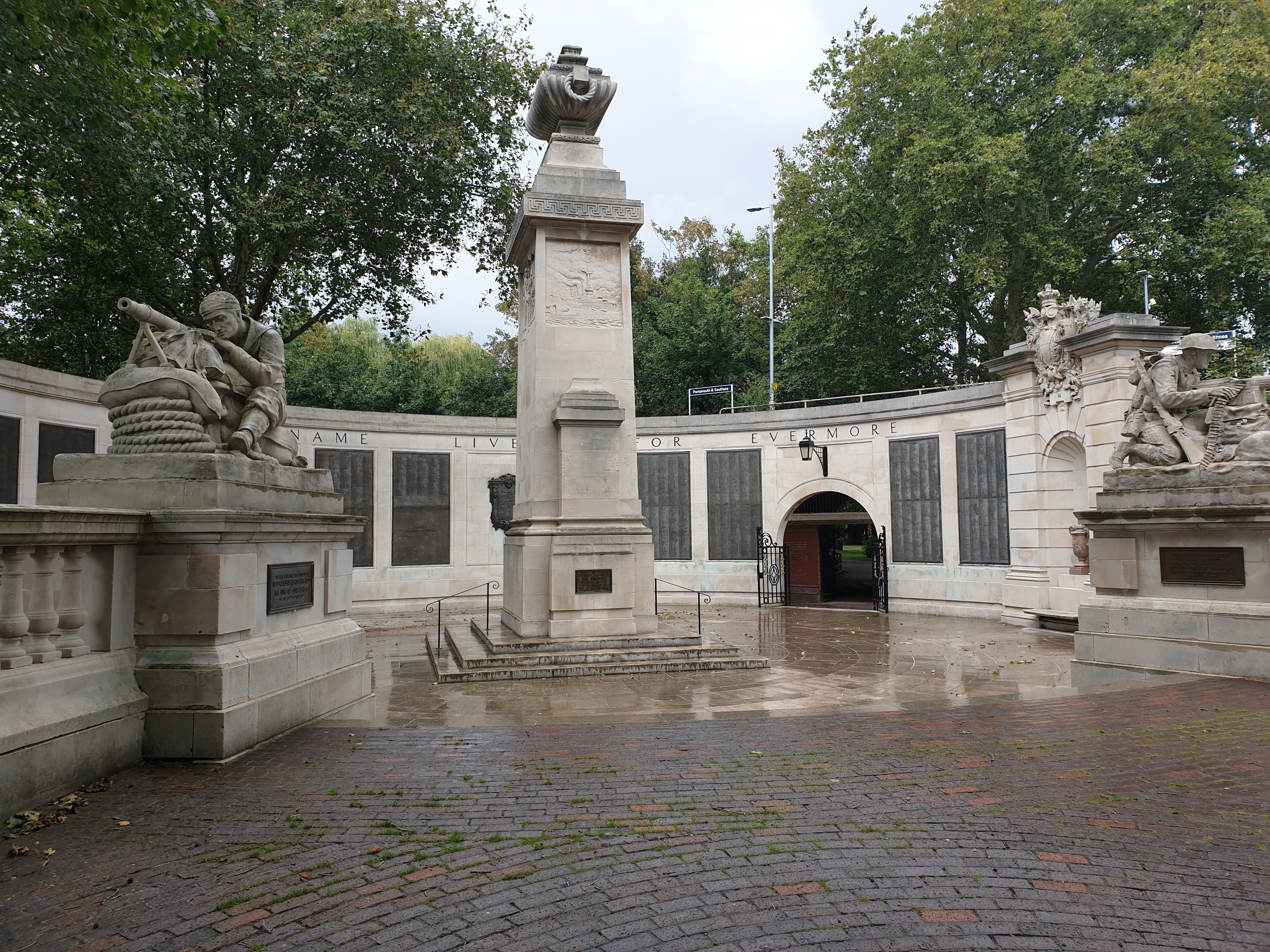
- For servicemen from Portsmouth killed in the First World War
- Unveiled: 19 October 1921; 104 years ago
- Location: 50°47′53.2″N 01°05′33.1″W; Guildhall Square, Portsmouth, Hampshire, England
- Designed by: James Gibson, Walter Gordon (architects); Charles Sargeant Jagger (sculptor)

Listed Building – Grade II*
- Official name: City of Portsmouth War Memorial
- Designated: 25 September 1972
- Reference no.: 1104318

The City of Portsmouth War Memorial, also referred to as the Guildhall Square War Memorial, is a First World War memorial in Guildhall Square in the centre of Portsmouth, Hampshire, on the south coast of England. Portsmouth was and remains a port and home to a major naval dockyard. The dockyard and the armed forces provided much of the employment in the area in the early 20th century. As such, the town suffered significant losses in the First World War. Planning for a war memorial began shortly after the end of the conflict and a committee was established for the purpose. It selected a site adjacent to a railway embankment close to the Town Hall (renamed the Guildhall in 1926 when Portsmouth was granted city status) and chose the architects James Gibson and Walter Gordon, with sculptural elements by Charles Sargeant Jagger, from an open competition.

The memorial consists of a semi-circular sunken recess (exedra) with a screen wall. Bronze panels fixed to the wall list the names of the city's dead. Archways in the wall lead out of Guildhall Square towards Victoria Park and the railway station, and balustrades lead away back into Guildhall Square, terminating in sculptures by Jagger of a life-size soldier and sailor with machine guns. In the centre is a cenotaph surmounted with an urn and decorated on the sides with relief carvings of wartime scenes. The Duke of Connaught unveiled the memorial on 19 October 1921, before its completion.

Guildhall Square was redeveloped in the 1970s and the memorial was adjusted slightly and another wall was created adjacent to the site. The names of casualties from the Second World War and a monument to that conflict were added in the 21st century. The First World War memorial is a grade II* listed building.

== Background ==
In the aftermath of the First World War and its unprecedented casualties, thousands of war memorials were built across Britain; nearly every town and city erected some sort of memorial. Portsmouth was and remains a port city and home to a major naval base. As such, many of the city's residents served in the Royal Navy or embarked on ships to fight in the British Army. Immediately before the war, over 25 per cent of Portsmouth's male working-age population served in the army or the navy and many more were employed in the dockyard. Around 6,000 Portsmouth residents were killed in the war, out of a population of around 200,000 and a workforce of around 85,000 as of the 1911 census. In 1914, 15,000 people were employed in the naval dockyard, a number which had more than doubled since the turn of the century as a result of the Anglo-German naval arms race.

The first local casualties of the war came from the sinking of HMS Amphion by a German mine within hours of Britain's entry into the war in August 1914. One of the largest groups of casualties came from the Battle of Jutland in 1916, the largest naval engagement of the conflict. Six Portsmouth-based ships were sunk at Jutland, with the loss of 4,000 lives, many of them local men.

Portsmouth was also a significant garrison town, with soldiers stationed there for the defence of the south coast and others en route to other points in the British Empire. In 1914, the 9th Infantry Brigade was barracked in Portsmouth and, at the outbreak of war, formed part of the British Expeditionary Force sent to France. Portsmouth additionally maintained a significant part-time volunteer Territorial Force unit—the Portsmouth Troop of the Hampshire Yeomanry, the officers of which included many of the town's dignitaries. With the foundation of Kitchener's Army and the call for volunteers, the town and surrounding area raised a further two pals battalions. Local historians estimate that more than one-third of the volunteers were killed.

Charles Sargeant Jagger (1885–1934) was a sculptor who joined the army at the outbreak of the First World War. He was wounded several times and awarded the Military Cross for gallantry. After the war, he largely established his artistic reputation with his designs for war memorials. His first memorial commission was the Hoylake and West Kirby War Memorial. The expressive figures he sculpted for that memorial were highly praised and were exhibited at the Royal Academy in 1921, leading to commissions for war memorials across England and several battlefield memorials abroad. Although memorialisation of the First World War was largely the preserve of architects, Jagger enjoyed more success as a designer of war memorials than any other British sculptor, receiving several high-profile commissions. After Portsmouth, he went on to design the Great Western Railway War Memorial and the highly celebrated Royal Artillery Memorial in London. All feature Jagger's characteristic "Tommy", a soldier in action, rather than a spiritual figure.

== Commissioning ==
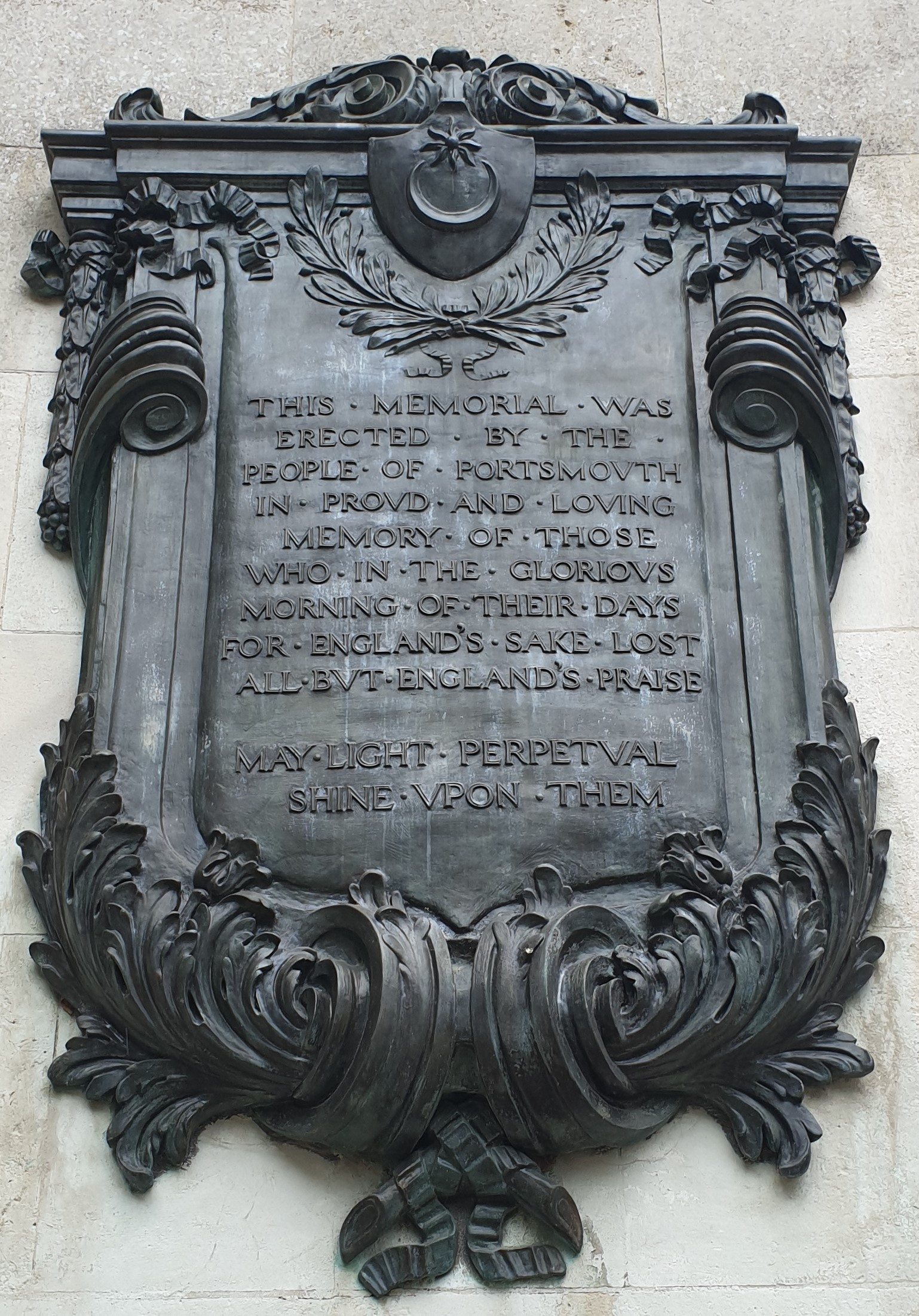
The wall plaque bearing the main dedication of the memorial

Discussions about commemorating Portsmouth's dead began almost immediately after the end of the war. The mayor, John Timpson, launched an appeal with a letter to the local newspaper, the Hampshire Telegraph and Post, on 27 December 1918, calling for both donations and suggestions as to the form of a memorial. To mark the signing of the Treaty of Versailles, which officially ended hostilities in June 1919, the Royal Navy fired a 101-gun salute off the Portsmouth coast. Several local churches proceeded with their own commemorations and each parish had kept its own roll of honour. A war memorial committee was established to organise the town's civic commemorations. The committee decided to erect a memorial at a site near the Town Hall (renamed the Guildhall in 1926 when Portsmouth was granted city status), adjacent to an embankment carrying the railway out of Portsmouth & Southsea railway station. The site was chosen as a prominent city-centre location, close to the town hall and Victoria Park.

The committee put the contract to design the memorial to a competition. Fifty designs were submitted and that of the London architectural firm of James Gibson and Walter Gordon was selected by an assessor from the Royal Institute of British Architects in early 1919. Gibson and Gordon produced a design involving several sculptural elements, for which they engaged Jagger. The contract for the construction work was won by a local firm, but the quote of just under £20,000 (approximately equivalent to £1,171,000 in 2024) exceeded the available budget and the architects were instructed to scale back their design. As a result, they removed several design elements, including an arch linking the memorial to the railway station, several statues, a fountain, and metalwork. The final cost was £15,808.

== Design ==
The memorial is built from Portland stone. It consists of a semicircular sunken recess, known as an exedra, with a screen wall 20 ft (6 m) high, creating a separate precinct. Attached to the wall are bronze panels listing the names of 4,500 dead, 500 of which were from Jutland. The names are organised by branch of service, with those from the army on the northern side, those from the navy on the southern side, and a smaller section in the middle for the fledgling Royal Air Force. Within the wall are two arched entrances with wrought iron gates. One, on the northern side, leads beneath the railway and into Victoria Park; the other, on the southern side, leads out of Guildhall Square. Above the panels is the inscription "THEIR NAME LIVETH FOR EVERMORE".

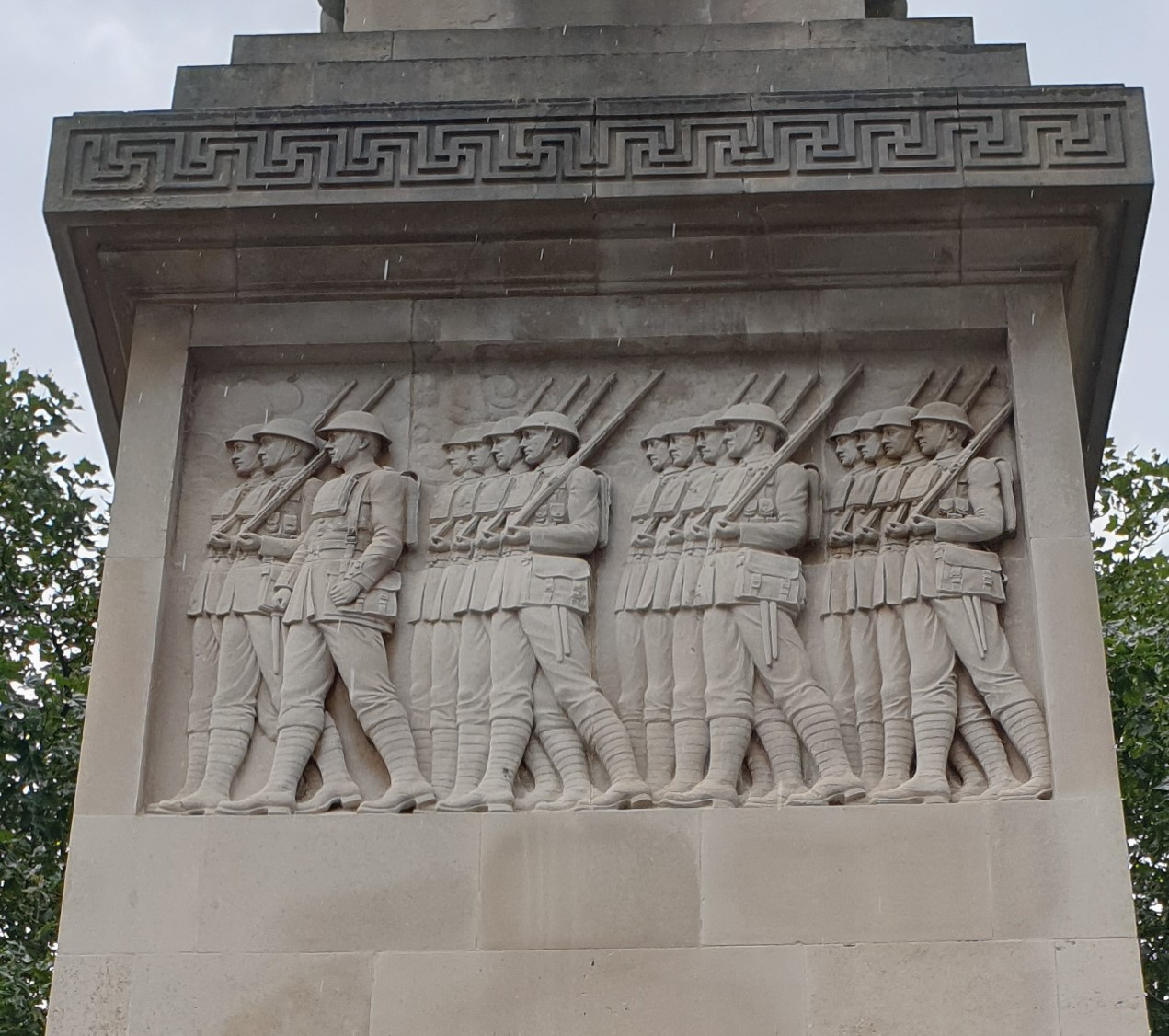
One of the relief carvings on the cenotaph, this one depicting a group of marching soldiers

The wall terminates in rusticated piers, each containing a recess with a seat supporting a bronze-coloured urn. Above the recesses is a relief carving of a trophy and a shield with a cluster of weapons behind, decorated to the front and sides with oak, laurel, and Acanthus; the whole carving is topped with a crown. Extending from the pillars are curved balustrades which terminate in stone pedestals. Mounted on these are two sculptures, flanking the entrance to the memorial. The sculpture on the south side is a sailor with a Lewis gun, representing the navy, and that on the north side is a soldier operating a Vickers machine gun, representing the army.

The centrepiece of the memorial is a cenotaph on a base of three steps. On its sides are shallow relief carvings of wartime scenes. The front relief is of two warships engaged in battle at sea and the rear shows multiple warships engaging a submarine. On the left-hand side (when viewed from the front) is a naval gun crew loading a shell, and on the right is a group of marching soldiers. Above the reliefs is a large Greek-style cornice and the structure culminates in a gadrooned sarcophagus urn.

In the centre of the screen wall is a metal plaque, which bears the dedication:

This memorial was erected by the people of Portsmouth in proud and loving memory of those who in the glorious morning of their days for England's sake lost all but England's praise. May light perpetual shine upon them.

Other plaques on the memorial commemorate its unveiling and denote that it was paid for by public subscription. A stone plinth was added in 2003, with the dedication: "TO HONOUR ALL THOSE WHO DIED SERVING THEIR COUNTRY IN TIMES OF PEACE OR CONFLICT. 'WE WILL REMEMBER' ".

Alan Borg, an art historian and museum curator, described Jagger's sculpted figures guarding the entrance to the memorial as an "interesting and effective version of the soldier in action". Another art historian, Geoff Archer, wrote that the memorial as "a particularly impressive example" of a sanctuary or precinct with a large wall used for lists of names, though described Jagger's flanking statues as "significantly his least successful" compared to his more stationary figures on other memorials, particularly his memorials for the Royal Artillery and the Great Western Railway. Historic England described the memorial as "an eloquent tribute to the servicemen and women of Portsmouth, and the sacrifices they made during the First World War" and praises its "distinguished design" and architectural interest in bringing together multiple "high-quality elements in a harmonious whole, creating a memorial of unusual dignity and power". It praises Jagger's sculptural work, describing it as "accomplished and animated sculpture" and noting the realism for which Jagger was famed and his "ability to evoke the physical reality of war", and notes its group value with other historic buildings in the area, including the Guildhall, the University of Portsmouth buildings, and the statue of Queen Victoria, as well as Victoria Park, which is a registered historic park.

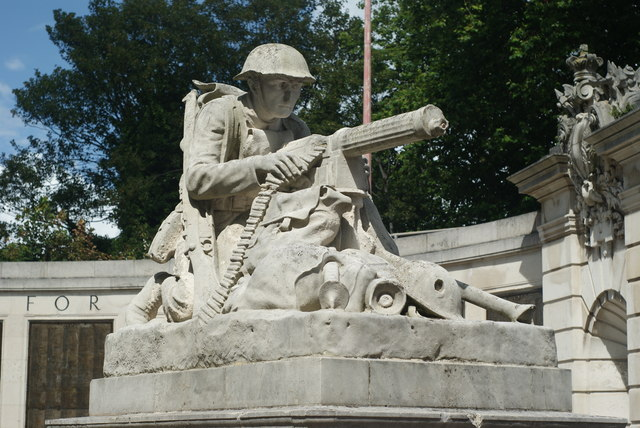
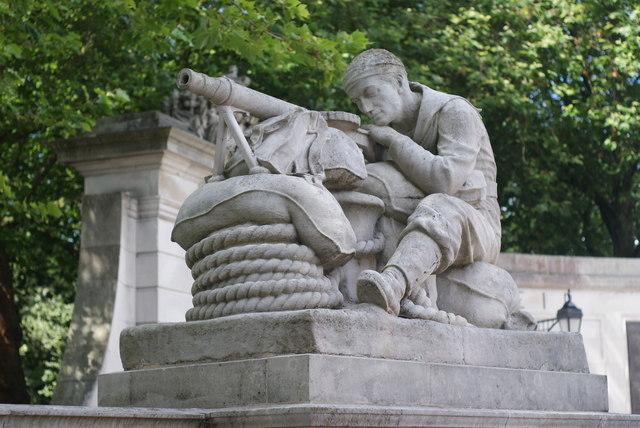
The two gunners, one from the army (left) and one from the navy (right), at the entrance to the memorial

== History ==
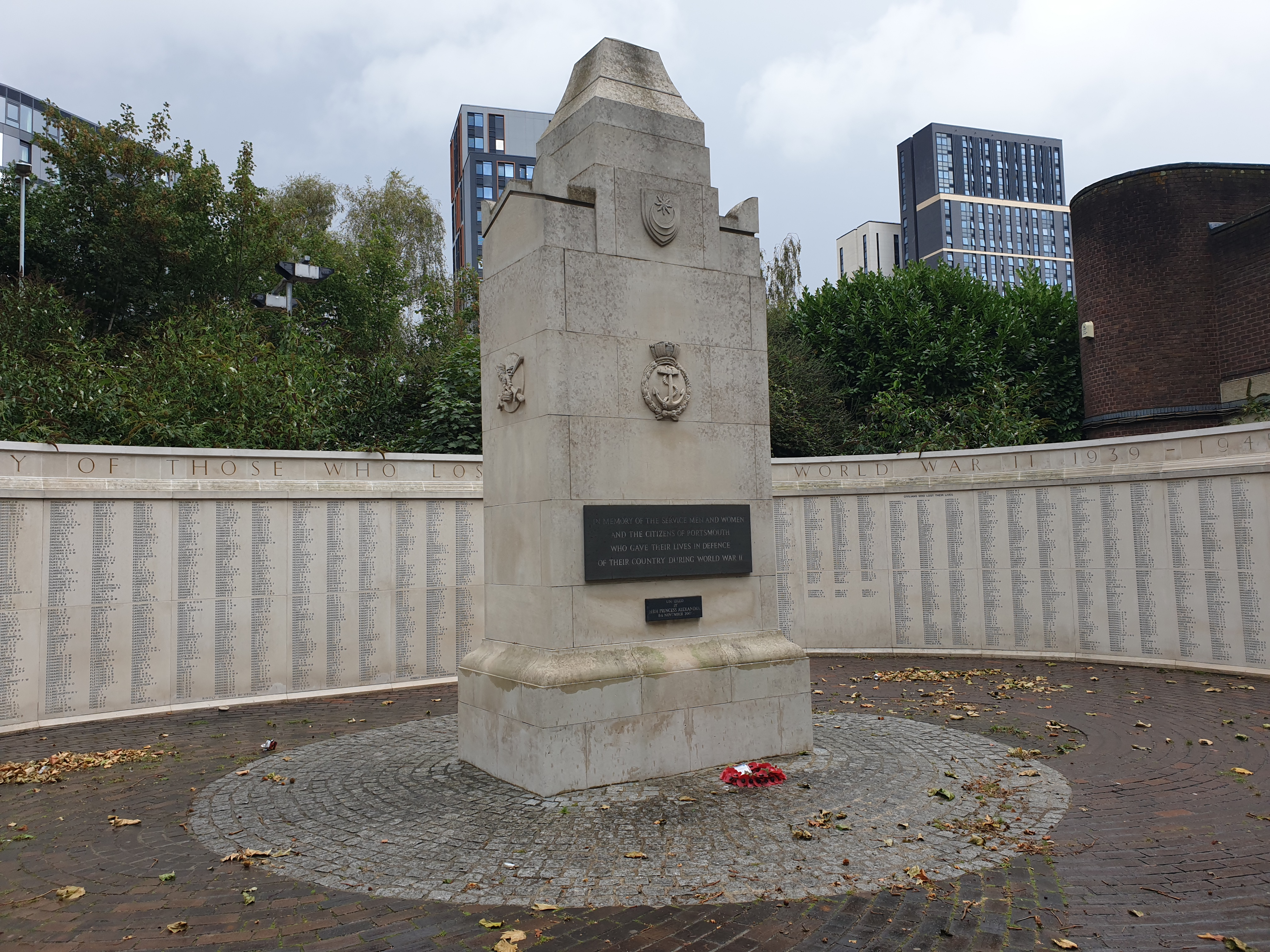
The Second World War memorial, unveiled in 2005 on a site adjacent to the First World War memorial. The wall behind dates from a redevelopment in the 1970s and the names were added in the 21st century.

The foundation stone of the memorial was laid on 25 May 1921, and the memorial was unveiled on 19 October 1921, before it was fully completed. A crowd of 30,000 people attended the ceremony, which was presided over by Prince Arthur, Duke of Connaught and Strathearn.

Funds raised by the war memorial committee were also donated to the Royal Portsmouth Hospital. Most were used to improve the services offered by the hospital, but a portion was used to build a memorial gate as an improved entrance from the city centre. The gate was opened by Princess Helena Victoria in May 1922. It was demolished, along with the hospital itself, and the area redeveloped in the late 20th century.

In the 1970s, Guildhall Square was redeveloped and the war memorial was reduced in size slightly from an oval shape to a round one and some elements were rearranged to fit. As part of the redevelopment, a wall was created to the east of the memorial. A separate cenotaph-style monument to the Second World War casualties was added to the site, in front of the wall, in 2005. The rectangular cenotaph features carvings of the badges of the armed forces and on the front, near the top, is the city's coat of arms. It was unveiled by Princess Alexandra in 2005. A wall containing 610 names was added in 2012 after a local fundraising campaign. The final names were added in 2013 after Portsmouth City Council provided a grant of £27,000.

In the 21st century, Portsmouth continues to be dominated by the Royal Navy and the dockyard, although downsized, still plays a vital part in city life. The memorial remains the focal point for the annual Remembrance Sunday services in the city, which are well attended, including by representatives of the armed forces.

The memorial was designated a grade II listed building in 1972 and upgraded to grade II* in 2016 to mark the centenary of the Battle of Jutland. Listed building status offers statutory protection from demolition or modification; grade II* is reserved for "particularly important buildings of more than special interest" and is applied to about 5.5 per cent of listings.

== See also ==
- Portsmouth Naval Memorial, Commonwealth War Graves Commission memorial on Southsea Common
- Grade II* listed buildings in Portsmouth
- Grade II* listed war memorials in England
