= Middlesex Quarter Sessions =

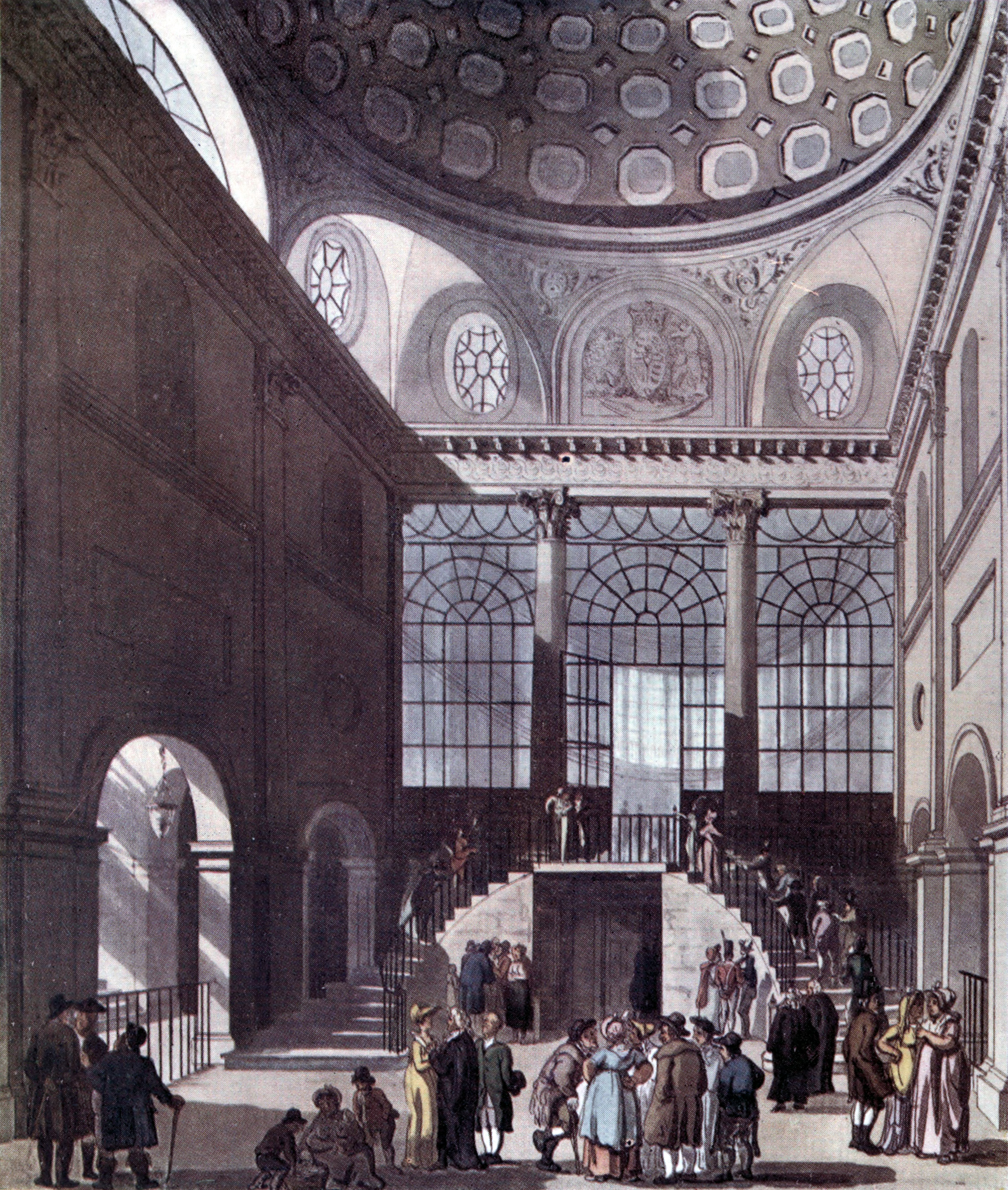
Middlesex Sessions House in 1810

The Middlesex Quarter Sessions was the quarter session court for the county of Middlesex, England. Membership was made up of the justices of the peace. The quarter sessions heard criminal cases and also had a role in the civil administration of the county. Administrative functions of the quarter sessions lasted from the 16th century to 1889 and included taxation, licensing, prisons, asylums and bridges. The Middlesex sessions area was reduced in 1889.

== Jurisdiction ==
It had overlapping jurisdiction with the Westminster Quarter Sessions within the City and Liberty of Westminster. Following the County Rates Act 1738 (12 Geo. 2. c. 29) there was a single county rate for Middlesex, including Westminster. The separate Westminster sessions ended in 1844 and were absorbed by Middlesex.

The Middlesex sessions did not have authority over the Liberty of the Tower which had separate sessions. The City of London held the City of London Quarter Sessions at the Guildhall.

== Court sessions ==
In order to accommodate the burdens of the populous metropolitan area, Middlesex sessions were unusual as they met eight times a year instead of the traditional four. The sessions were location at Hicks Hall, St John Street, Clerkenwell from 1601, with the April and October sessions taking place at Westminster Hall. A new Middlesex Sessions House was opened at Clerkenwell Green in 1780.

The area of the Middlesex sessions was reduced in 1889 when the County of London Quarter Sessions were created. The Middlesex sessions moved to Westminster Guildhall, also the location of Middlesex County Council from 1913. Middlesex Quarter Sessions were replaced by the Greater London Quarter Sessions in 1965, although the Middlesex area continued to be used as a commission area for sessions until 1971.

== Local government functions ==
From the sixteenth century, the court had a role in the local government of Middlesex, which contained many of the metropolitan parishes of London. County functions of the court included maintenance of bridges, responsibility for gaols, the regulation of weights and measures, and supervision of the Poor Law.

During the eighteenth century committees were set up to deal with specific county business.

Local government functions passed to the London County Council and the Middlesex County Council in 1889.

== Members ==
The judges of the court were the justices of the peace. There was no requirement for legal training and after 1835 the county sessions were the only remaining courts where this was permitted. From 1844 it became a requirement that the chairman of the Middlesex sessions must be legally qualified.

=== Chairmen ===
- George Jeffreys
- John Hawkins (1765–1780)
- William Mainwaring (1781–1816)
- Sir John Scott Lillie (1790-1868)
- John George Henry Pownall
- Sir Ralph Littler (?–1908)
- Montagu Sharpe (1909–1934)
- Thomas Forster (1934–1936)

== Records ==
Surviving records are held at the London Metropolitan Archives.
