= Beatrice Offor =

British painter

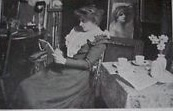
- Beatrice Offor in her studio (1902)
- Born: 21 March 1864; Sydenham, England
- Died: 8 August 1920 (aged 56); London

Beatrice Offor (1864–1920) was a British painter. She is primarily known for portraits, often of an esoteric nature.

== Life ==
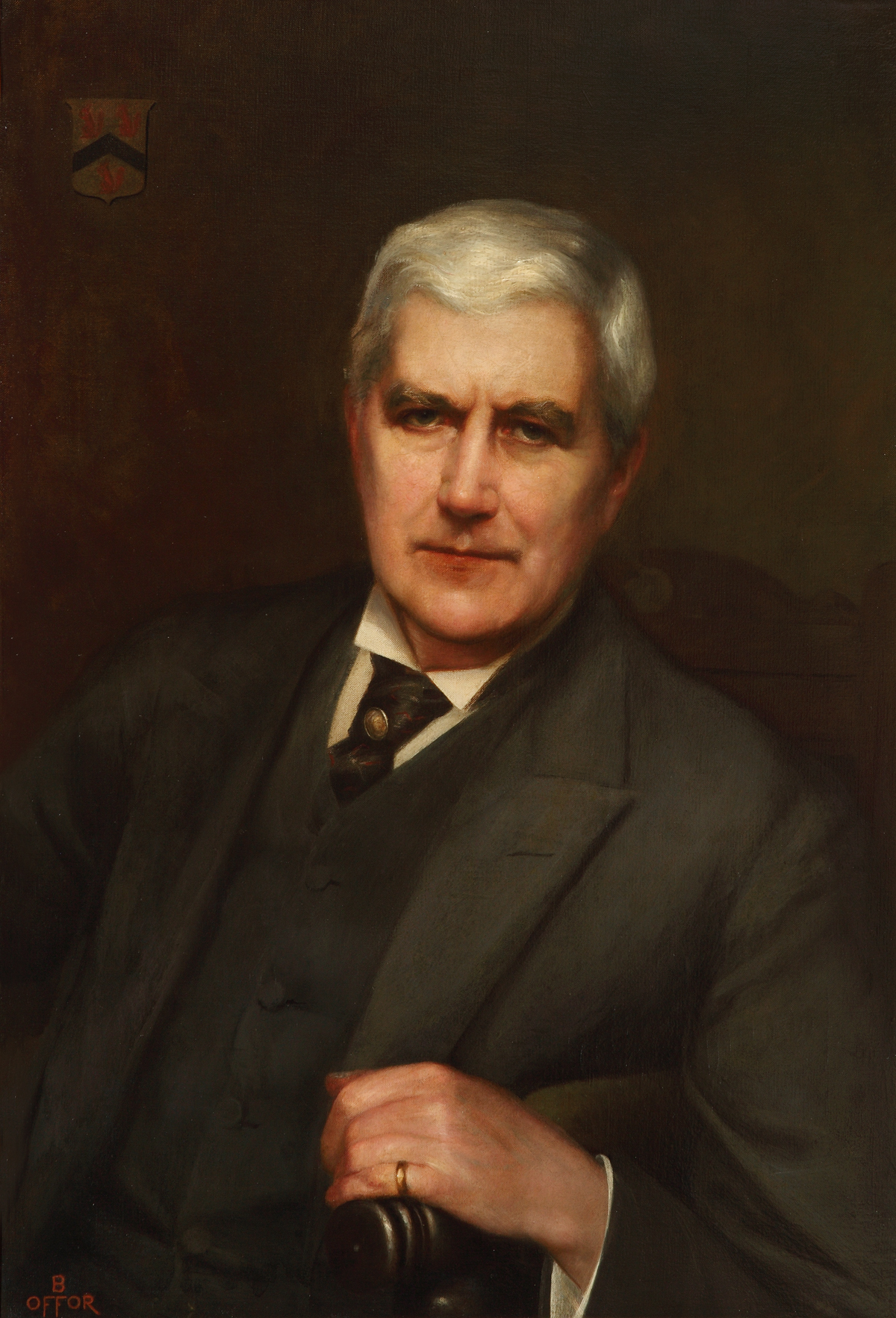
Ralph Littler by Offor, c.1903–1904

Offor was born in 1864 in Sydenham, Kent and trained at the Slade School of Art in London, where she became a close friend of Moina Mathers. In 1892 she married William Farran Littler, an artist and sculptor.

Much of her work consisted of representations of heads of young women. A report published in 1907 said that:

the famous "Offor Heads" are known the world over. Indeed, it may be said that Miss Beatrice Offor is one of the most popular artists of the day, her pictures are eagerly sought after, and publishers vie with one another for the honour of giving her works to the public.

Her paintings were shown regularly at the Royal Academy of Arts. She often used her sisters as models, often painting brides and nude women. She also painted portraits of Joseph Howard MP and Sir Ralph Littler, KC. She painted a copy of Perugino's Virgin and Child for Tottenham Parish Church. Her work Drawing from the Antique won a Third Class Fine Arts certificate from University College London.

For some time she was based in Chelsea – the Royal Academy catalogues give an address in the King's Road from 1899 – but following her second marriage to James Philip Beavan, a fruit importer, in 1907, she moved to Bruce Grove, Tottenham, in North London. She suffered a nervous breakdown in 1919, and died on 7 August 1920 from injuries sustained after falling from a window. A verdict of suicide while of unsound mind was returned at the inquest. She is buried at Brockley and Ladywell Cemeteries.

== Public collections ==
Almost 40 of her paintings are held in the collection of the Bruce Castle Museum, Tottenham; they include portraits of young women, local dignitaries, and a woman believed to be the novelist 'Ouida'. Her portrait of Sir Ralph Littler is in the Middlesex Guildhall Art Collection.

A centenary exhibition "Sisters, Sirens and Saints: Imagining the Women of Beatrice Offor" at Bruce Castle has been extended until March 2024.

== Selected paintings ==
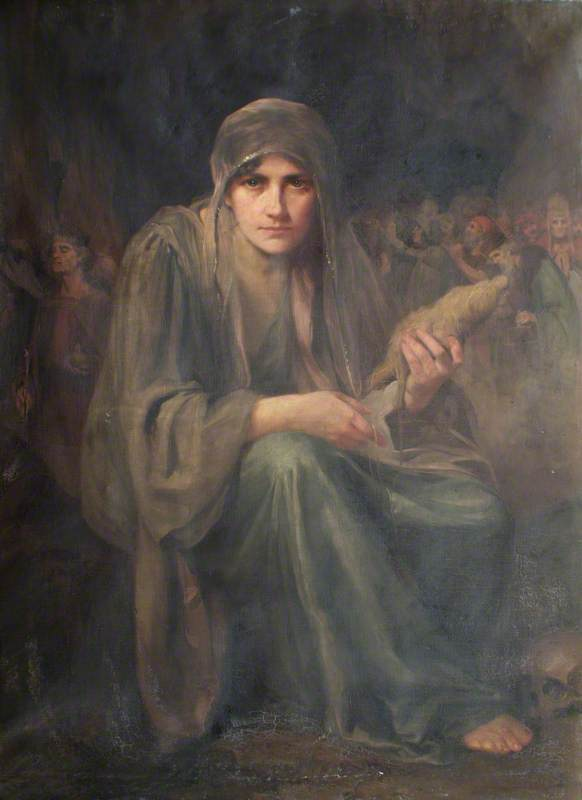
Destiny

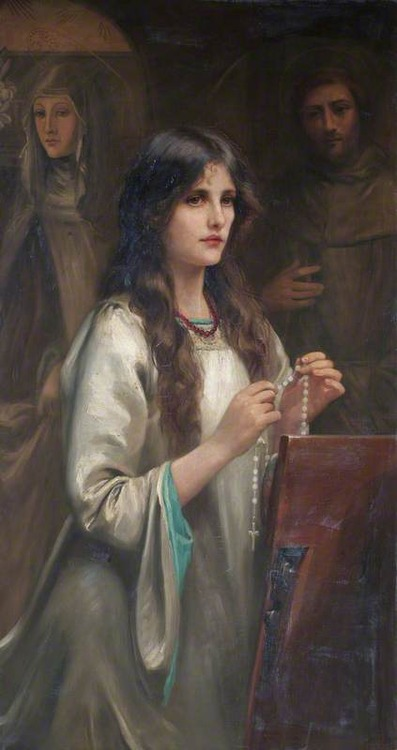
The Rosary

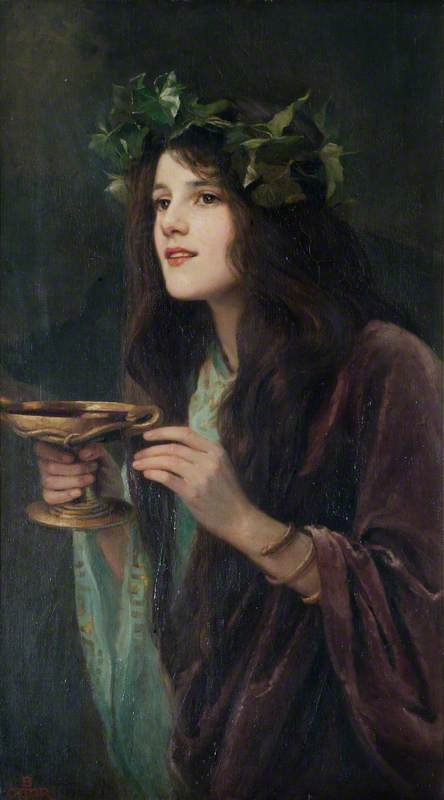
Circe

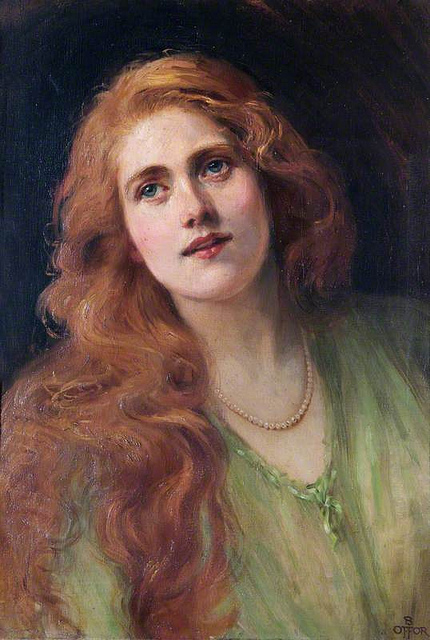
Miss B.S.

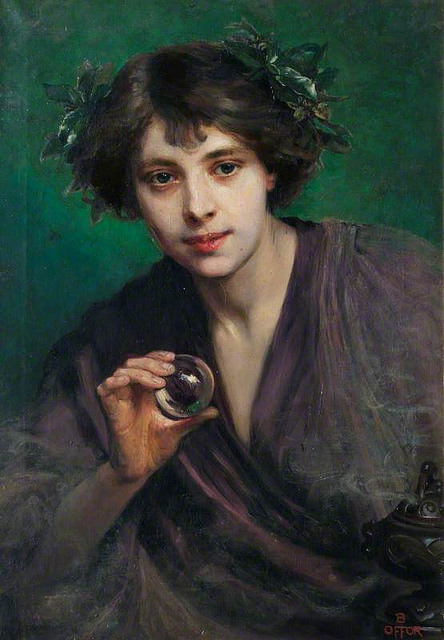
The Crystal Gazer
