= Suzanne Norwood =

English crown court judge (1926–2024)

Her Honour Suzanne Freda Norwood

Personal details
- Born: 24 March 1926
- Died: 15 April 2024 (aged 98)
- Spouse: John Stewart
- Children: David Stewart
- Education: University of St Andrews

Her Honour Suzanne Freda Norwood (24 March 1926 – 15 April 2024) was an English Crown court judge at Isleworth and the Middlesex Guildhall. She also served on the Parole Board, the Mental Health Review Tribunal and was president of the Medico-Legal Society. Norwood died on 15 April 2024, at the age of 98.

Norwood went to school at Lowther College, then studied English and history at the University of St Andrews. She was called to the bar at Gray's Inn in 1951, and married barrister John Stewart in 1954.
