= Georgina Kent =

British Circuit judge (born 1966)

Georgina Kent (born 25 June 1966) is a British Circuit judge.

Born in Malaysia, she was educated at King's College London (LLB). She was called to the bar at Gray's Inn in 1989 and served as a Recorder from 2002 to 2009. She became a Circuit Judge in 2009, first at Isleworth Crown Court, and then at Kingston Crown Court since 2011.
