= Admiral Arbuthnot =

Admiral Arbuthnot may refer to:

- Charles Ramsay Arbuthnot (1850–1913), British Royal Navy admiral
- Geoffrey Arbuthnot (1885–1957), British Royal Navy vice admiral
- Mariot Arbuthnot (1711–1794), British Royal Navy admiral
- Sir Robert Arbuthnot, 4th Baronet (1864–1916), British Royal Navy rear admiral

== See also ==
- Alexander Dundas Young Arbuthnott (c. 1789–1871), British Royal Navy rear admiral
