= Montagu Sharpe =

English politician, lawyer, amateur archaeologist, antiquarian, and ornithologist

Sir Montagu Sharpe KBE DL
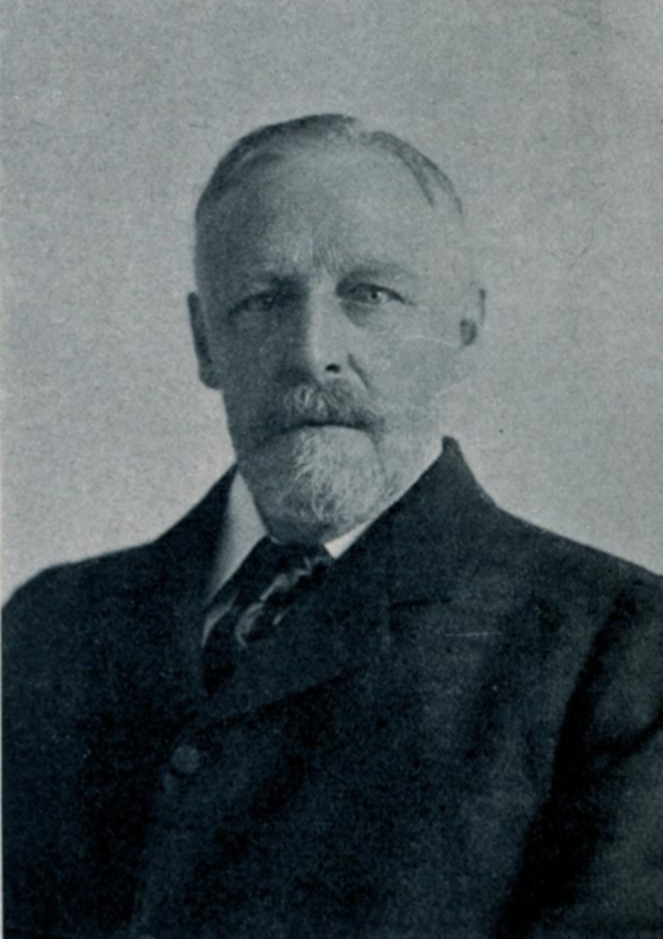
- Sir Montagu Sharpe, c. 1923

Chairman of the Royal Society for the Protection of Birds
- In office 1895–1942
- Preceded by: William Henry Hudson
- Succeeded by: Phillip Brown

Chairman of the Middlesex County Council
- In office 1908–1909
- Preceded by: Ralph Littler
- Succeeded by: William Regester

Chairman of the Middlesex Quarter Sessions
- In office 1909–1934
- Preceded by: Ralph Littler
- Succeeded by: Thomas Foster

President of the London and Middlesex Archaeological Society
- In office 1930–1940
- Preceded by: Edward Brabrook
- Succeeded by: Edmund Byng, 6th Earl of Strafford

Personal details
- Born: 28 October 1857
- Died: 23 August 1952 (aged 94)
- Occupation: Politician; lawyer; amateur archaeologist; antiquarian; ornithologist

Sir Montagu Sharpe KBE DL (28 October 1857 – 23 August 1942) was an English politician, lawyer, amateur archaeologist, antiquarian, and ornithologist.

== Family background and early life ==
Montagu Sharpe came from an old Middlesex family that owned Hanwell Park. He was born in Hanwell to Lt Cmdr Benjamin Sharpe of the Royal Navy and his wife Marianne Fanny Montagu, daughter of the Rev. Montagu of Swaffham, Norfolk. Montagu studied law, and was called to the bar at Gray's Inn in 1889.

== Career ==
Sharpe was a member of the Middlesex County Council from its founding in 1889 and a justice of the peace for Middlesex. He was knighted in 1922 and also became a Deputy Lord Lieutenant of Middlesex. Sharpe served as chairman of the Royal Society for the Protection of Birds from 1896 to 1942. He was active in the introduction of the Importation of Plumage (Prohibition) Bill and involved in framing initial drafts. An archaeologist, Sharpe served as the president of the London and Middlesex Archaeological Society from 1930–1942

He wrote a local history, Middlesex in British, Roman and Saxon Times (1919), in which he suggested that the Roman system of centuriation could be seen in the layout of old manors, but his idea was viewed sceptically by other historians of the period. Later studies have pointed out that his evidence was weak.

Sharpe was a Freemason, serving as Grand Deacon of the United Grand Lodge of England. He was the founder of Haven Lodge and Hanwell Lodge in Ealing, and Horsa Dun Lodge and Jersey Lodge in Middlesex.

== See also ==
- Plume hunting
