= Cuckoo Schools =

Educational estate

Coordinates: 51°31′16″N 0°20′8″W

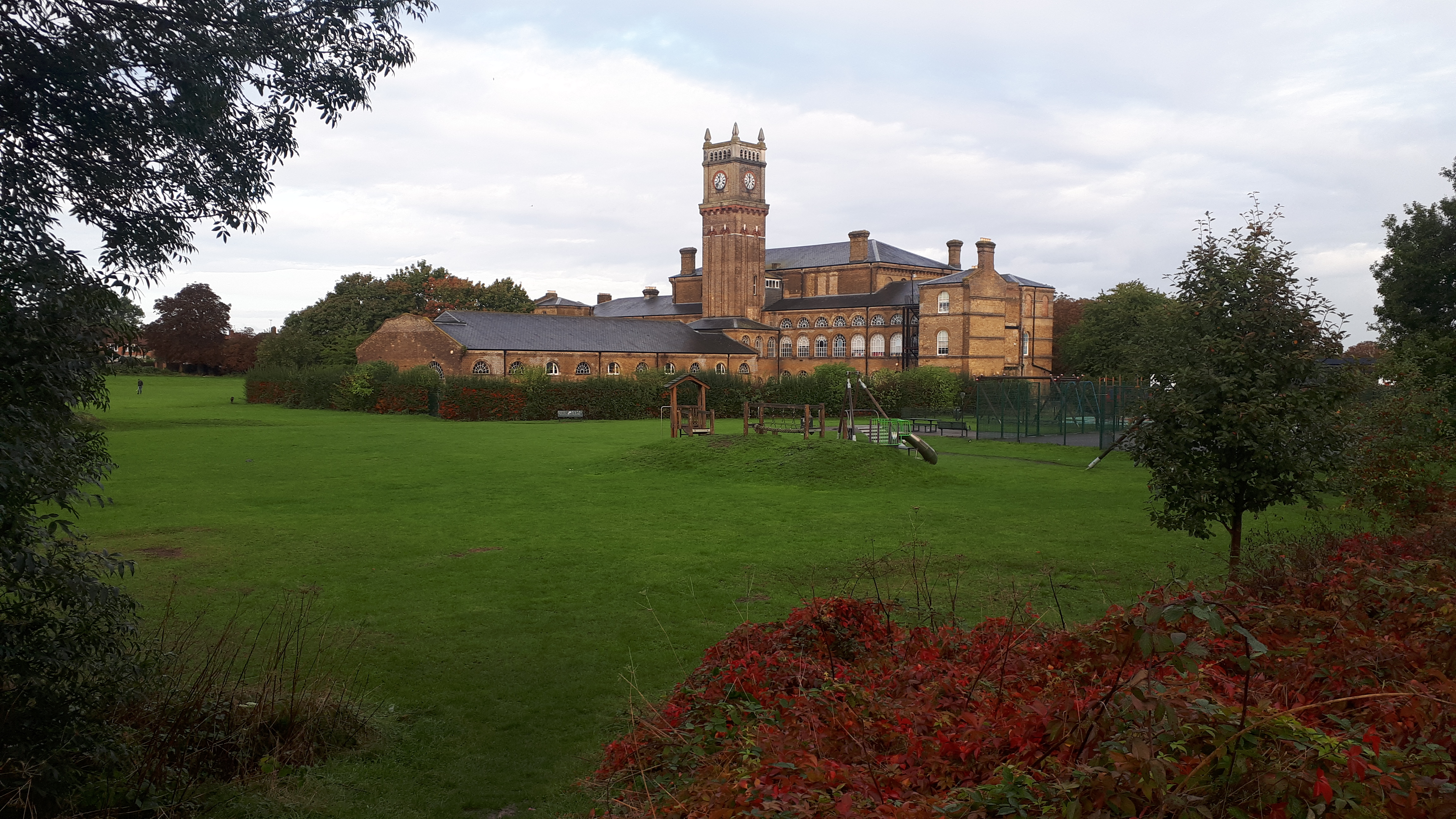
Hanwell Community Centre on Westcott Crescent (previously Cuckoo Schools)

Cuckoo Schools was a large school for children of destitute families which was created as the Central London District Poor Law School by the City of London and the East London and St. Saviour Workhouse Unions in 1857. It was built on the land of Cuckoo Farm on Cuckoo Hill in 190 acres (77 ha) of Hanwell. 20 acres (8.1 ha) were kept as a working farm to educate and feed the children.

The school was closed down in 1933. In the same year a large housing estate began to be built on the 140-acre (57 ha) site around the school. This was completed in 1939. Some damage due to a flying bomb was sustained during World War II. The estate which became known as the Cuckoo Estate is now a conservation area.

The school buildings which remain, consisting of the old administrative block, are now used as the Hanwell Community Centre on Westcott Crescent, and they have been a Grade II listed building since 19 January 1981. In 2015 the London Welsh School moved into the building.

== Notable former pupils ==
- Charlie Chaplin
- Sydney Chaplin
