= Hanwell Park =

Farming estate in west London, England

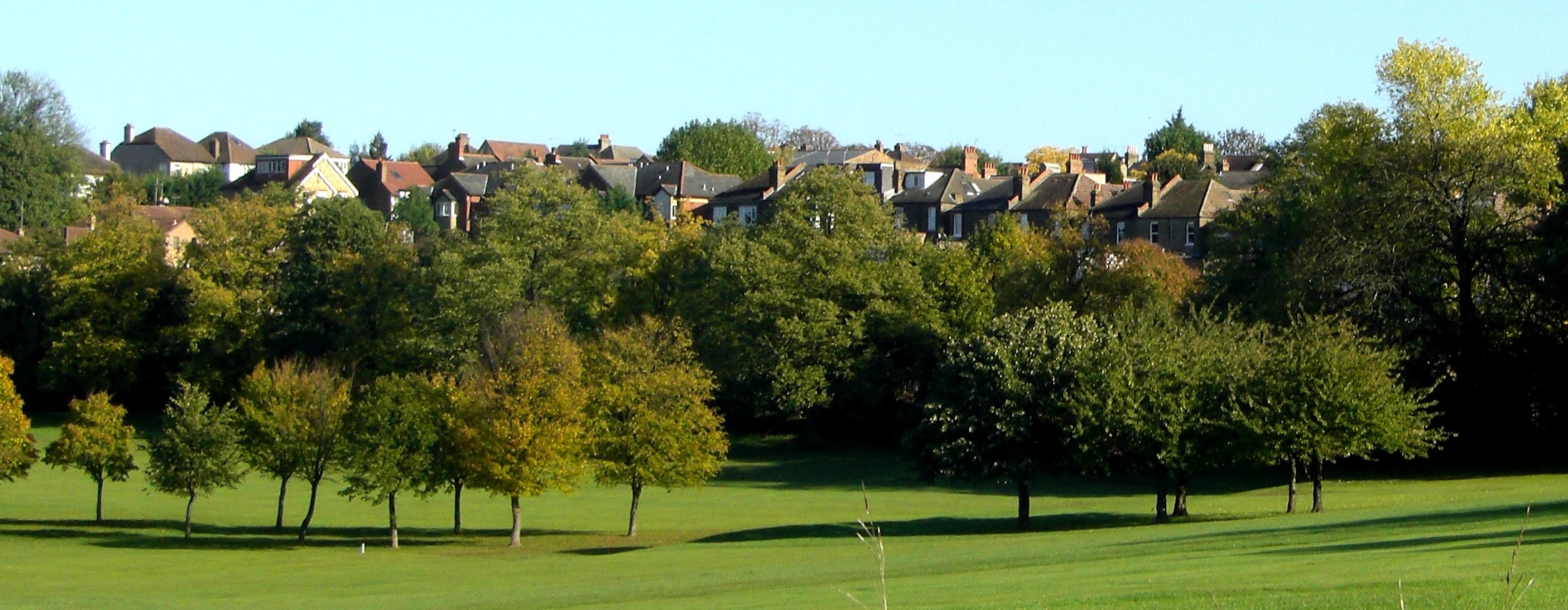
Part of Hanwell Park after its redevelopment for housing

Hanwell Park was a farming estate in west London. It was built up by Charles Gostlin in the 18th century by acquiring property from neighbouring landowners. Gostlin died in 1766 and left the estate to his cousin's sons, William and Henry Berners. The estate was finally broken up by 1886 after Sir Montagu Sharpe had sold the holding he had inherited.

Brent Valley golf club was formed from the estate of The Grove - a landed estate of 29 acres formed on the breakup of the much larger Hanwell Park estate in 1837 and enfranchised in 1860. Nearby is Cuckoo Hill, the site of a battle between Romano-British and Saxons in the sixth century known as Blood(y) Croft and this bloodshed is a suggested origin of the name Hanwell; haenwael being a slaughter on high ground. The graves of seven Saxon leaders were found on this site in 1886 along with broken spearheads. The land was then built upon with Edwardian housing in 1905 when the London United Tramways Company was at last allowed to run trams through Ealing borough in 1901, causing a further wave of housing development in the area.

== Hanwell Park house ==
Charles Gostlin built a house at Hanwell Park, shown on John Rocque's map of 1746 as a square block. Henry Berners rebuilt the house, probably in the 1770s. A set of contract drawings exists by the architect Robert Mylne for a three-bay villa for 'Mr Berners, Hanwell'. These are signed by Henry Berners and the builder, Thomas Hardwick. The drawings formed part of a lot sold at Christies in 2013. The house was extensively remodelled after 1806 producing a much larger neoclassical house. John Henry Brady, in his 1838 guide A new pocket guide to London and its environs, described the estate as an "attractive seat" whilst others noted that though not large it was situated in extensive grounds. Sir Archibald Macdonald, once Chief Baron of the Exchequer had owned the house, but it had been demolished by 1913.

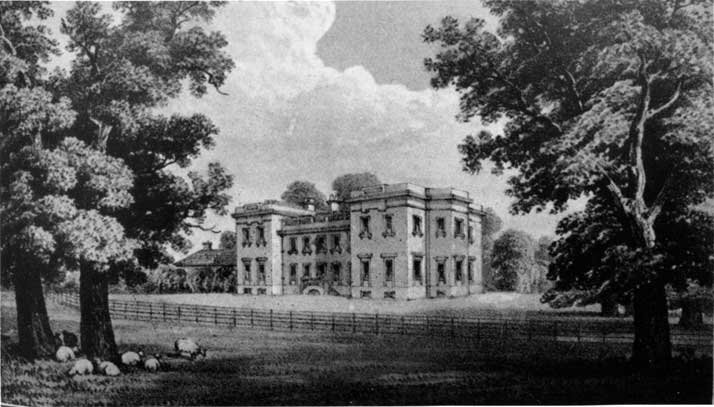
Hanwell Park: north and west fronts from an engraving published in 1855

== Maps ==
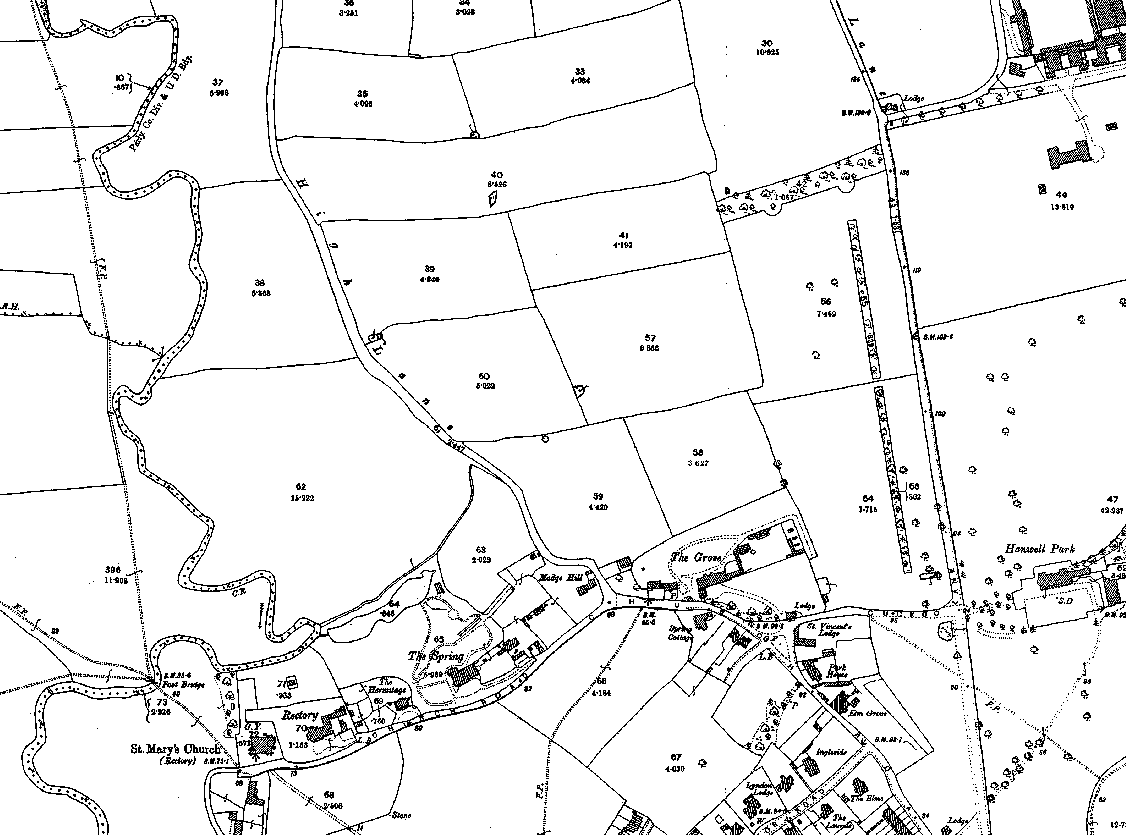
Brent valley and Cuckoo Hill in 1894. The Grove is at the bottom centre. This estate formed the golf course. To its left are other notable buildings such as The Spring and St. Mary's Church, Hanwell. The river Brent runs down the left side of the map. On the right side of the map are Hanwell Park and, above it, the substantial premises of the Central London District School which faced the northern leg of the avenue.

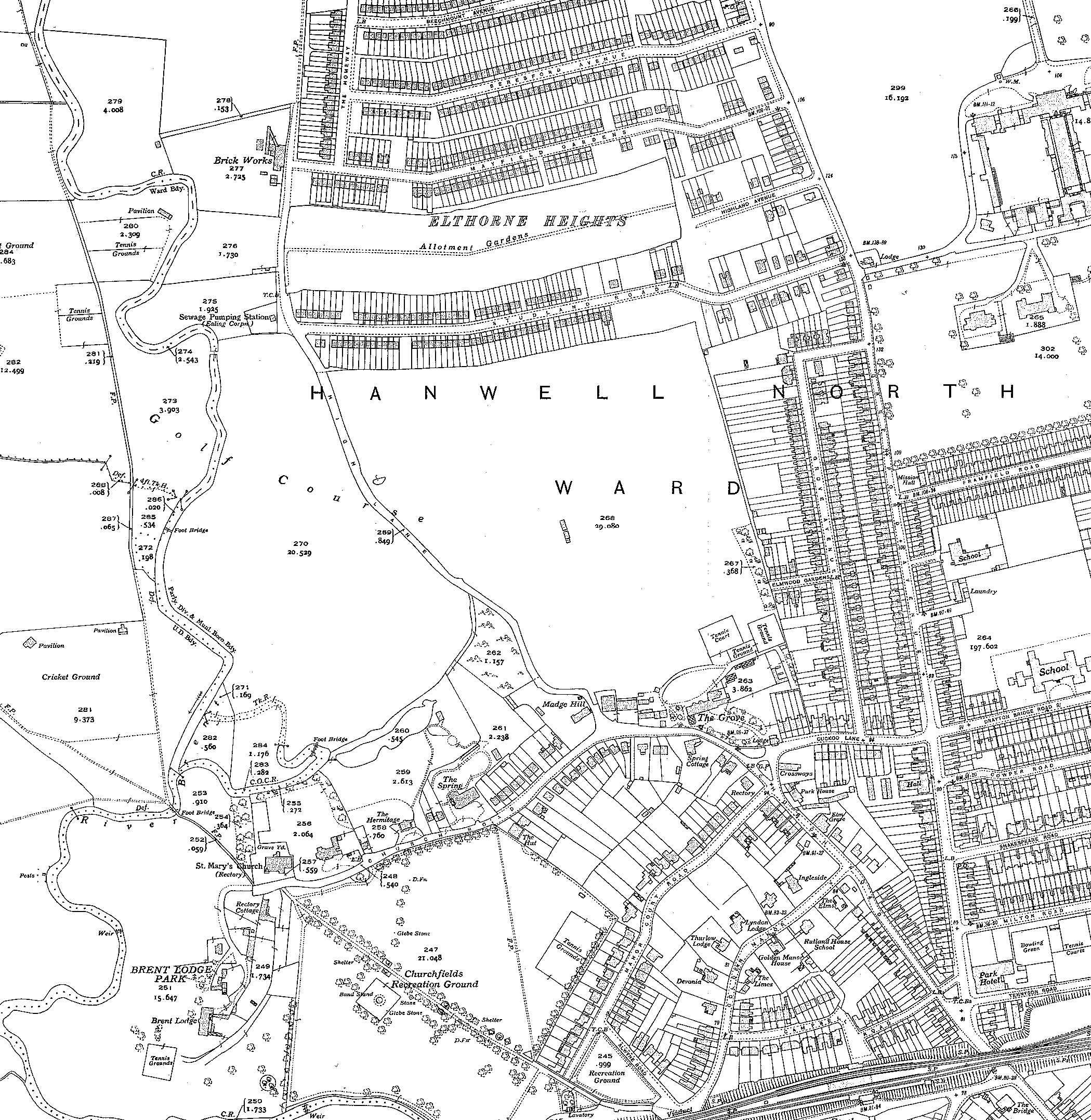
Brent valley and Cuckoo Hill in 1934. The Grove is now the clubhouse for the golf course and Grove Avenue has been built to the east. Hanwell railway station on the Great Western Railway is at the bottom of the map.
