= Middlesex County Council =

Former local authority in England

- Coat of arms of the Middlesex County Council

Type
- Type: County council of Middlesex

History
- Established: 1 April 1889
- Disbanded: 1 April 1965
- Preceded by: Middlesex Quarter Sessions
- Succeeded by: Greater London Council
- Seats: Councillors and aldermen

Elections
- Last election: 1961

Meeting place
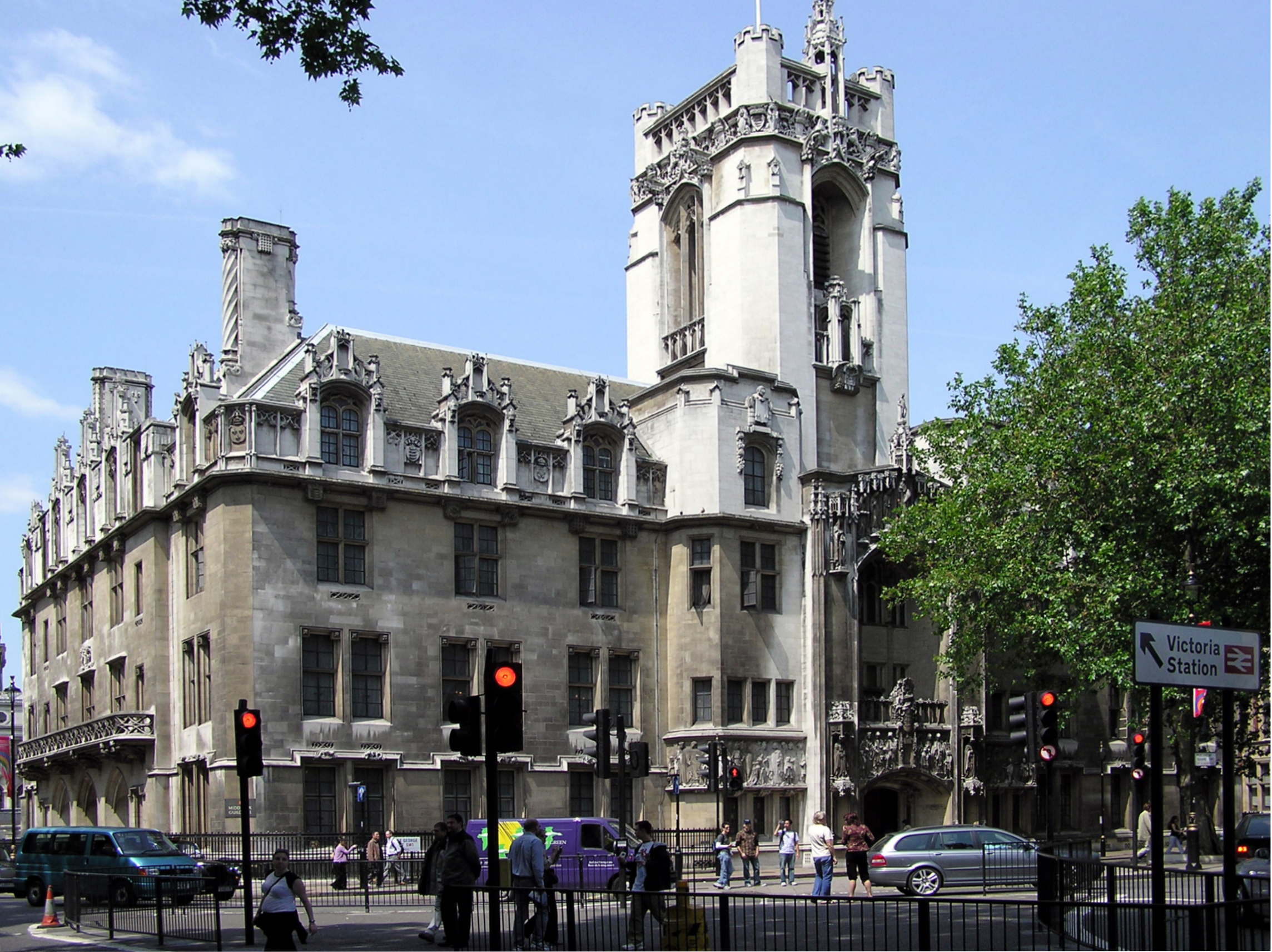
- Middlesex Guildhall, Westminster

Middlesex County Council was the principal local government body in the administrative county of Middlesex from 1889 to 1965.

The county council was created by the Local Government Act 1888, which also removed the most populous part of the county to constitute the County of London.

== Elections and political control ==
The county council consisted of elected councillors and co-opted county aldermen. The entire body of county councillors was elected every three years. Aldermen were additional members, there being a ratio of one alderman to three councillors. Aldermen had a six-year term of office, and one half of their number were elected by the councillors immediately after the triennial elections.

The first elections were held in January 1889. The first meeting of the "provisional" county council was held on 14 February 1889 at Westminster Town Hall. Although the council did not use political labels, among the aldermen elected were members of the parliamentary Conservative Party.

From 1919, the scarcely political composition of the council was challenged by the election of members of the Labour Party. The 1922 and 1925 elections were, for the most part, not run on party lines. In 1928, the majority of the council were described as "Moderate", with Labour forming an opposition. Labour continued to make advances at the 1931 election, and this led to the formation of a Middlesex Municipal Association "representative of all anti-Socialist members". The association was supported by the various Conservative Party organisations of the county although it was not officially affiliated to the party, and controlled the council until 1946.

In 1946, Labour took control of the county council for the first time. Following this, the Conservative Party contested elections to the county council, winning control in 1949 and holding it at the 1952 and 1955 elections. In 1958 Labour regained control. At the elections held in 1961, the Conservatives were returned to power. These were to be the final elections to the county council: under the London Government Act 1963 the elections due in 1964 were cancelled, with elections to the shadow Greater London Council being held instead.

== Chairmen of the Middlesex County Council ==
The chairman of the county council chaired its meetings and also represented it in a ceremonial manner, in a similar fashion to the mayor of a borough. Twenty-nine people served as chairmen over the council's existence.

Years	Chairman	Notes
1889–1908	Ralph Daniel Makinson Littler	Companion of the Bath 1890; knighted 1902
1908–1909	Montagu Sharpe	Knighted in 1922
1909–1919	William Regester	
1919–1924	Cecil Fane De Salis	Made a Knight Commander of the Bath in 1935.
1924–1927	Benjamin Todd	
1927–1930	Charles Pinkham OBE	Former MP for Willesden West 1918–1922. Knighted 1928.
1930–1933	George Marlow Reed	
1933–1936	Howard Button	Knighted 1936. Former MP for Wrekin 1922–1923
1936–1937	Sir William Prescott	Created a baronet in 1938. Former MP for Tottenham North 1918–1922
1937–1940	Forrester Clayton	
1940–1943	Sir Gilfrid Gordon Craig	
1943–1946	William Reginald Clemens	
1946–1947	Bernard Harry Rockman	
1947–1948	Frederick Messer	First Labour chairman. MP for Tottenham South 1929–1931, 1935–1950 & then Tottenham to 1959. Knighted 1953.
1948–1949	William John Irving	
1949–1951	Albert Henry Farley	
1951–1953	William Josiah Grimshaw	Knighted 1953 "for political and public services in Middlesex"
1953–1954	Sir Archer Hoare	
1954–1955	Albert Noel Hansel Baines	
1955–1956	Stanley Graham Rowlandson	Knighted 1956
1956–1957	Christopher George Armstrong Cowan	Knighted 1958
1957–1958	William Rendel Myson Chambers	
1958–1959	Thomas Henry Joyce	
1959–1960	George Albert Pargiter	MP for Spelthorne 1945–1950, Southall 1950–1966, whereupon elevated to the Lords.
1960–1961	Muriel Rose Forbes	
1961–1962	Sir Joseph Haygarth	
1962–1963	James Henry Knaggs	
1963–1964	Frances Timpson	
1964–1965	John Wilfred Barter MP	MP for Ealing North

== Functions, powers and responsibilities ==
Middlesex County Council's main responsibilities were:

- Highways and bridges: including the construction or widening of the Great West Road, Western Avenue, North Circular Road, Great Cambridge Road and the Chiswick Flyover. A joint committee with Surrey County Council had responsibility for bridges over the Thames. Among bridges constructed or reconstructed were Kew Bridge, Hampton Court Bridge, Twickenham Bridge and Chiswick Bridge.
- Education: In 1891 the county council began providing technical education. In 1902 it was given responsibility for secondary education throughout the county and for primary education in some areas. Under the Education Act 1944 it became the education authority for all purposes. At the time of its abolition, Middlesex County Council maintained 622 primary schools, 232 secondary schools, 12 nursery schools and 29 special schools. There were 14 technical colleges, colleges of art or commerce and two teacher training colleges. The technical colleges were the forerunners of the present University of Middlesex and Brunel University London.
- County Library Service
- Public Hospital Service: following the abolition of the poor law system in 1930, the county council took over a number of hospitals. Examples were Chase Farm Hospital, the North Middlesex Hospital and Edgware General Hospital. These passed to the National Health Service in 1948.
- Middlesex Fire Service from 1948.
- Middlesex Ambulance Service from 1948.
- Main drainage and sewage disposal.
- Motor taxation from 1909.
- Planning from 1948.
- Various regulatory and licensing functions includes weights and measures.
- The division of the county into coroner's districts and the appointment of coroners.

== Principal officers ==
The principal officers of the county council over its 76-year existence were:

=== Clerk of the County Council ===
- 1889-1909: Sir Richard Nicholson
- 1909-18: Walter George Austin
- 1919-35: Ernest Walter Sidney Hart (knighted 1935)
- 1935-54: Clifford Walter Radcliffe (knighted 1953)
- 1955-65: Kenneth Goodacre – became Deputy Clerk of the Greater London Council 1964.

=== County Engineer and Surveyor ===
- 1889-98: Frederick Hyde Pownall
- 1898-1920: Henry Titus Wakelam
- 1920-32: Alfred Dryland
- 1932-49: William Henry Morgan
- 1949-65: Henry Stuart Andrew

=== Chief Education Officer ===
- 1945-52: Thomas Benjamin Wheeler
- 1952-65: Cecil Ernest Gurr

=== Chief Officer of Fire and Ambulance Service / Chief Fire Officer ===
- 1948-63: Alfred Wooder
- 1963-65: Frank Stephen Mummery

== Replacement ==
The number of homes in Middlesex, an area static in size, rose from 236,266 to 665,347 in the forty years to 1961. The chart of this rise, which tapered off, shows that by 1951 Middlesex formed part of the London conurbation, and in 1965 the council was abolished on the creation of the Greater London Council. All but four electoral divisions of the council's closing 87 became part of the brand-new Greater London; the rest were transferred to Surrey as to the two parts of Staines plus Sunbury-on-Thames, or to Hertfordshire as to Potters Bar. These were three urban districts.

New creation	County council 1889–1965	Succeeded by Greater London Council; Hertfordshire County Council; Surrey County Council
