= Ralph Littler =

English barrister

Sir Ralph Daniel Makinson Littler CB KC JP DL
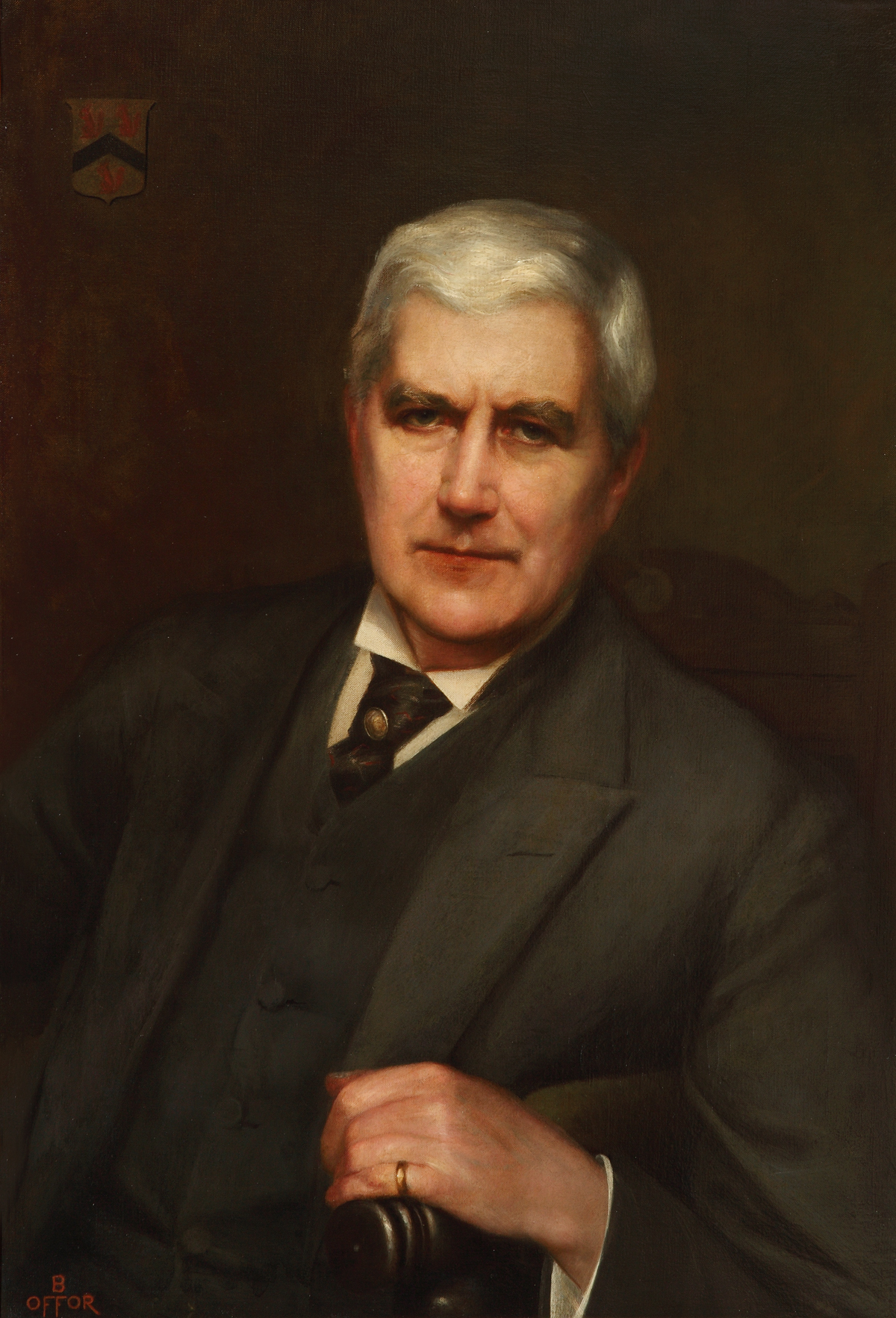
- Sir Ralph Littler, by Beatrice Offor, on display at the UK Supreme Court

Chairman of the Middlesex County Council
- In office 1889–1908
- Succeeded by: Montagu Sharpe

Chairman of the Middlesex Quarter Sessions
- In office ?–1908
- Succeeded by: Montagu Sharpe

Personal details
- Born: 2 October 1835
- Died: 23 November 1908 (aged 73)
- Education: University College School, University College London
- Occupation: Lawyer

Sir Ralph Daniel Makinson Littler (2 October 1835 – 23 November 1908), was an English barrister and magistrate who served as Chairman of the Middlesex Quarter Sessions until his death in 1908.

== Biography ==
A son of the Rev. Robert Littler and Sarah Makinson, he was educated at University College School before going up to University College London, where he was Common Law Prizeman. Called to the Bar at the Inner Temple in 1857, he joined the Middle Temple in 1870, becoming a Bencher in 1882 and Treasurer in 1901.

Littler practised on the Northern, then the North-East circuits as a junior becoming a Queen's Counsel in 1873, and then mainly practised at the Parliamentary Bar. From 1889, he was in the public eye as Chairman of the Middlesex Quarter Sessions. He was known for his severity, once sentencing a man to five years' penal servitude for the theft of a penny, though the circumstances were particularly egregious.

Appointed a Companion of the Order of the Bath in 1890, Littler was knighted in 1902 and served as Master of the Worshipful Company of Curriers for 1907/08.

== See also ==
- Curriers' Company
