= James Glen Sivewright Gibson =

British architect

James Glen Sivewright Gibson (23 November 1861 – 27 March 1951) was a British architect active in the late nineteenth and early twentieth centuries.

== Life and career ==
Gibson was born in Arbroath the son of William Gibson and Elizabeth Sivewright and the brother of Robert Gibson, civil engineer and architect, practising in Dundee. He was articled to Ireland & Maclaren, Dundee, from 1877 to 1881, and was thereafter a draughtsman with Pearce Brothers, engineers, and then with Alexander Hutcheson. He subsequently moved to London and worked for William Wallace, Harry Wilkinson Moore, and finally Thomas Edward Collcutt. At some point he travelled in France and Italy before commencing practice and passing the qualifying exam, both in 1889. He was admitted an Associate of the Royal Institute of British Architects, his proposers being the Dundee architect John Murray Robertson, Collcutt and James Brooks. In that year, he set up in independent practice.

In 1890, Gibson entered into partnership with Samuel Bridgman Russell, also from William Wallace's office. Born in 1864, Russell had been articled to Henry Hewitt Bridgman 1881–84 and had studied at the Royal Academy Schools from 1882, thereafter becoming a draughtsman in the office of Thomas Chatfield Clarke. The partnership of Gibson and Russell was dissolved in 1899, during the construction of the West Ham Technical Institute. Russell entered into partnership with Edwin Cooper a few years later and eventually becoming Chief Architect to the Ministry of Health.

Thereafter Gibson practised in partnership with William Wallace until 1909, when he took into partnership his two senior assistants, Frank Peyton Skipwith and Walter Symington Athol Gordon. Born in 1881, Skipwith was educated at Cheam School and Neuenheim College, Heidelberg, and articled to Gibson in 1903, remaining as an assistant and studying at the Architectural Association. He did not however take the qualifying exam and was admitted LRIBA on 20 March 1911. Gordon, born in 1879, had been articled to Robert Rowand Anderson 1895–1901 and had studied under Frank Worthington Simon at the Edinburgh School of Applied Art before joining Gibson. Like Skipwith, Gibson did not take the qualifying exam, being elected LRIBA on 27 February 1911.

Skipwith enlisted in the armed forces in the First World War and was killed in action in France in September 1915. The practice continued thereafter as Gibson & Gordon.

Gibson died on 27 March 1951 at the age of eighty nine.

== Buildings ==
Gibson was one of his period's "competition men" who "made his career by winning competitions." He had a remarkable record of success in competitions, beginning with the London County Council hostel in Drury Lane, London in 1891, the West Riding County Hall in Wakefield, completed in 1898, and possibly his greatest achievement, the Middlesex Guildhall, 1913. Others included the war memorial in Guildhall Square, Portsmouth, which included sculpture by Charles Sargeant Jagger.

Gibson's style was generally Gothic in conception. Where he worked with Henry Charles Fehr, as at the West Riding County Hall and the Middlesex Guildhall, the result of Gibson's architecture and Fehr's exuberant internal design was a remarkable combination of Gothic and Art Nouveau, in both of which styles Fehr excelled.
