= Victoria Park, Portsmouth =

Urban park in Portsmouth, England

Victoria Park
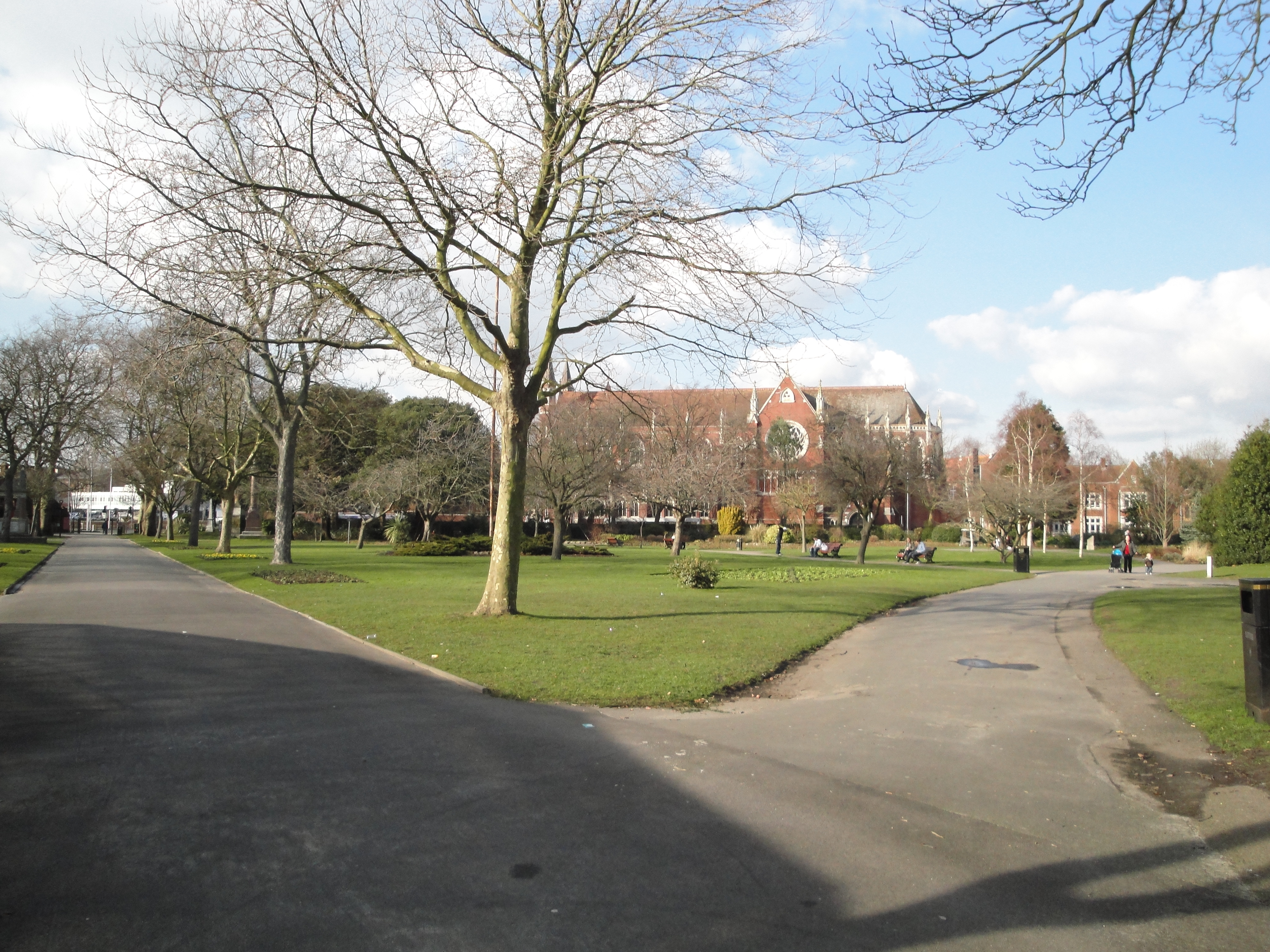
- Looking east from the centre of the park.
- Interactive map of Victoria Park
- Type: Public park
- Location: Portsmouth, Hampshire.
- Coordinates: 50.7990°N 1.0940°W
- Area: 15 acres (61,000 m^{2})
- Operator: Portsmouth City Council
- Status: Open all year

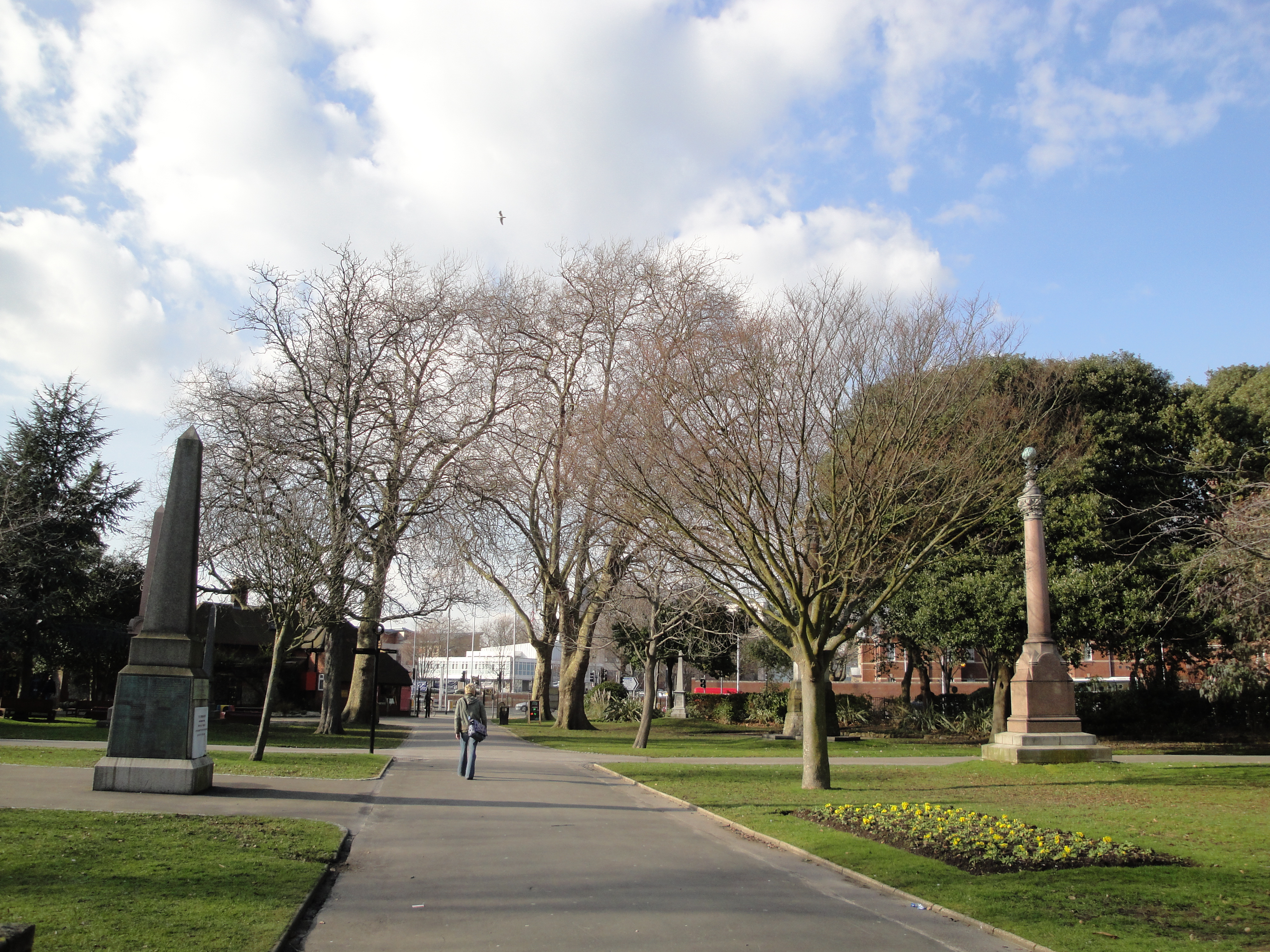
Memorials to the east of the park.

Victoria Park is a public park located just to the north of Portsmouth Guildhall, adjacent to Portsmouth and Southsea railway station and close to the city centre in Portsmouth, Hampshire. It was officially opened on 25 May 1878 and was the first public park to be opened in Portsmouth. It was designed by Alexander McKenzie. The land had previously been the site of part of Portsmouth's defensive ramparts. It has a total area of around 15 acres (61,000 m^{2}) and is planted with trees, shrubs and flowers. The centre of the park features an enclosed area which houses animals such as birds, rabbits and guinea pigs. The park has a brick and rubble lodge. A second lodge didn't survive to the present day.

The park is also home to a number of monuments, with several of them being listed buildings. These mostly consist of obelisks but there is also one in the style of a Chinese temple in memorial of HMS Orlando.

At the start of December 2022 a £3.2 million redevelopment of the park began with DM Habens as the primary contractor. It was supported by £2.4 million lottery grant.

== Memorials ==
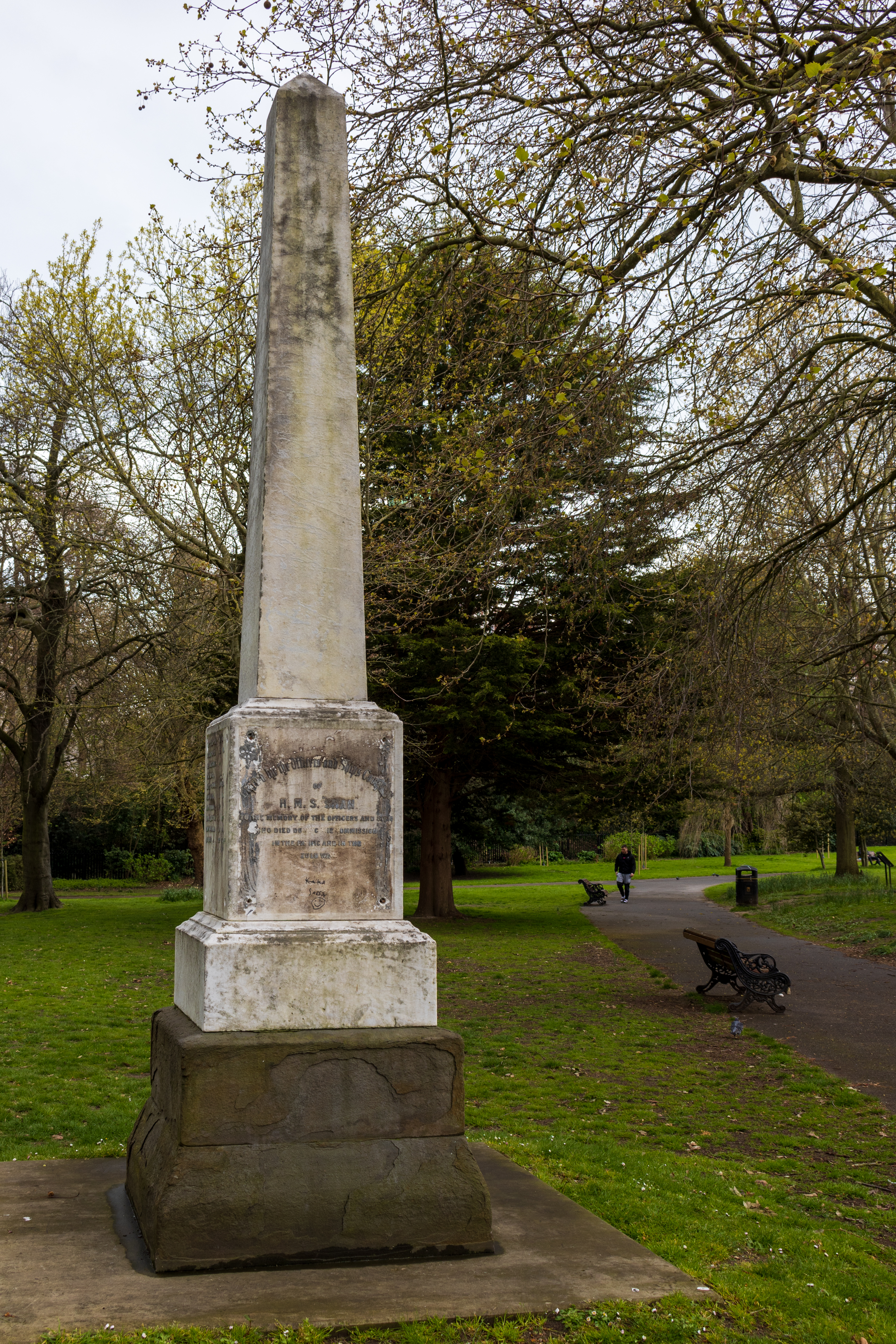
HMS Shah memorial, Grade II listed

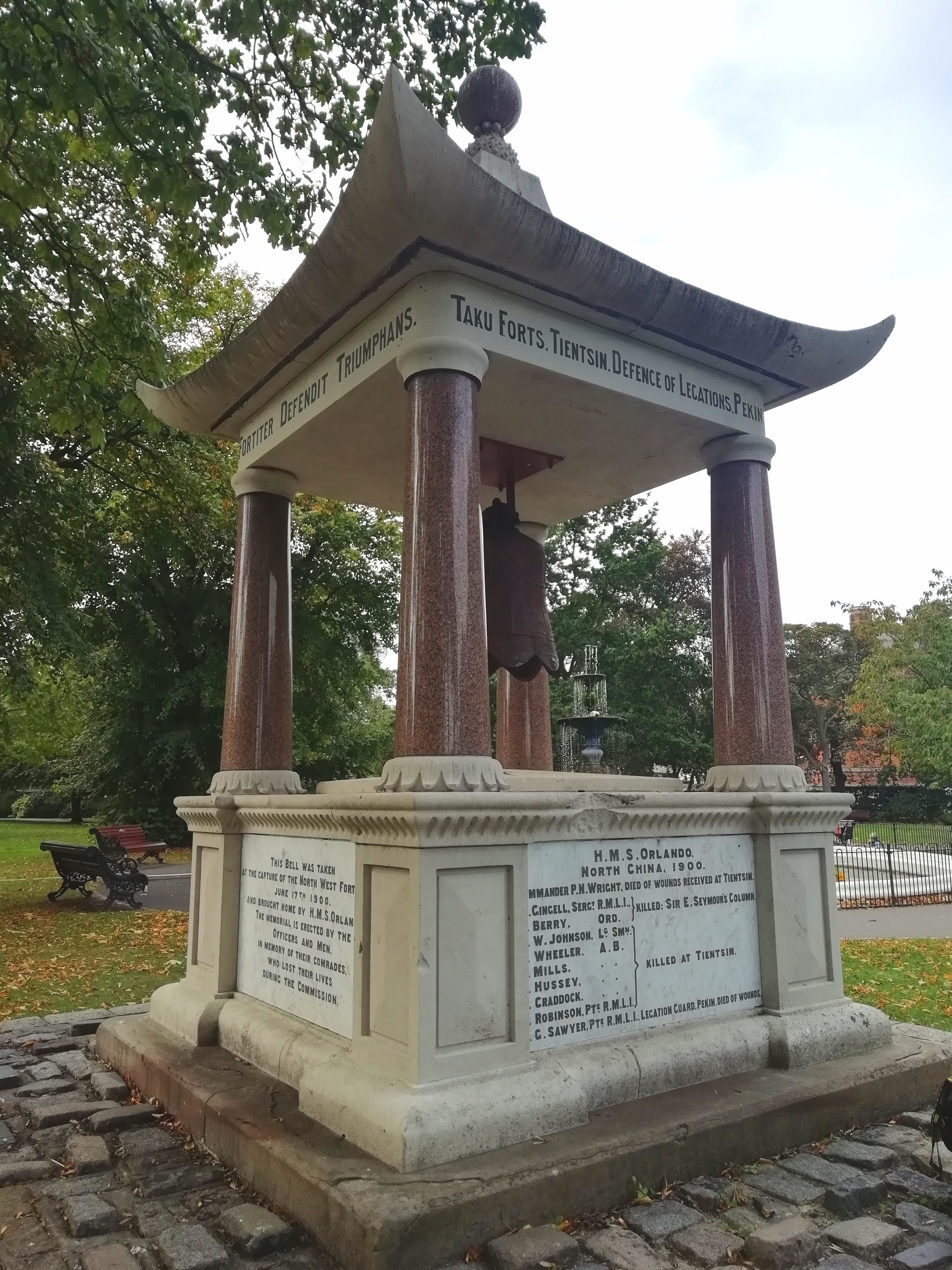
HMS Orlando memorial, Grade II listed. The bell was captured from the Taku Forts in China in 1890.

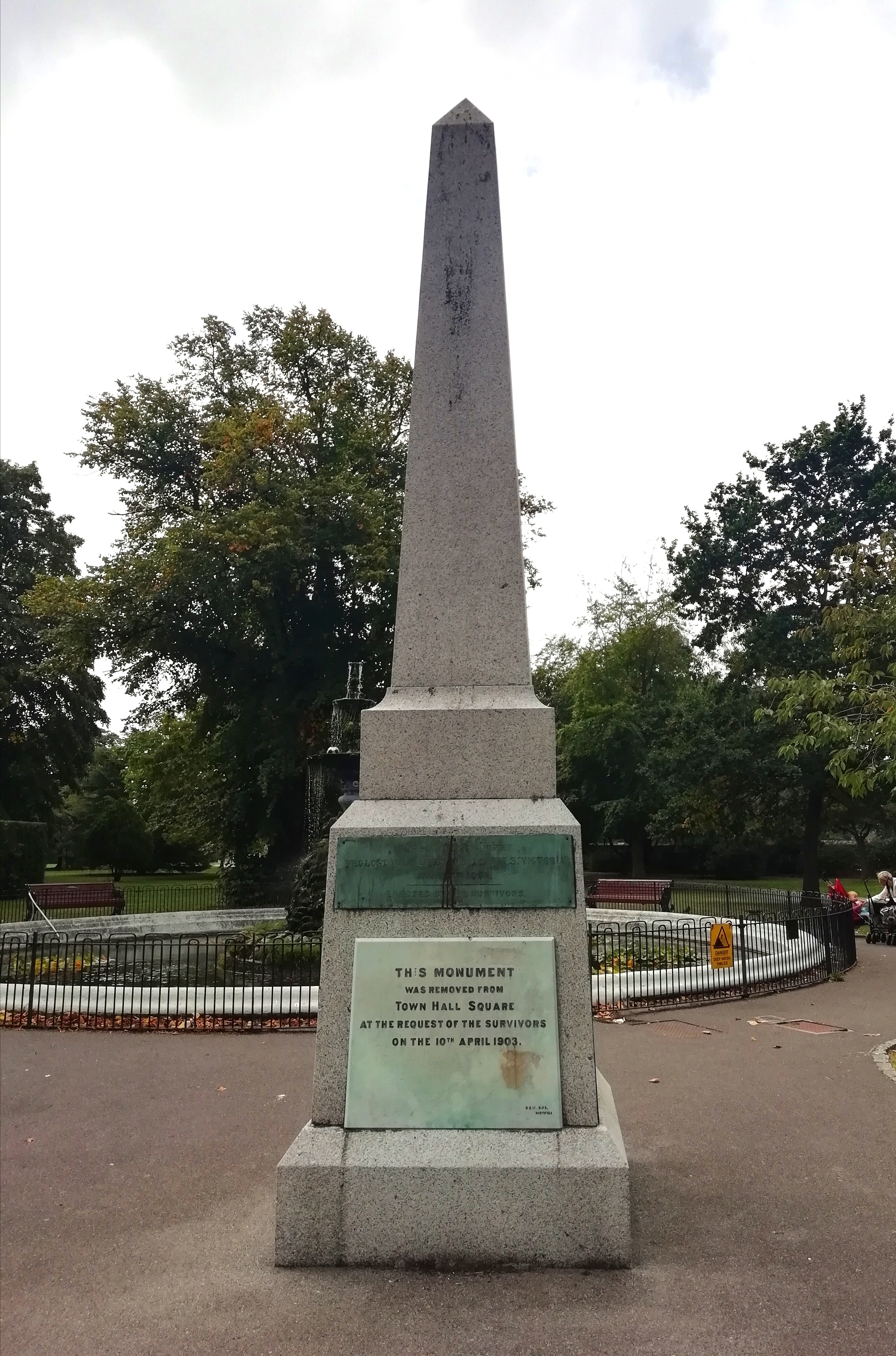
HMS Victoria memorial, Grade II listed

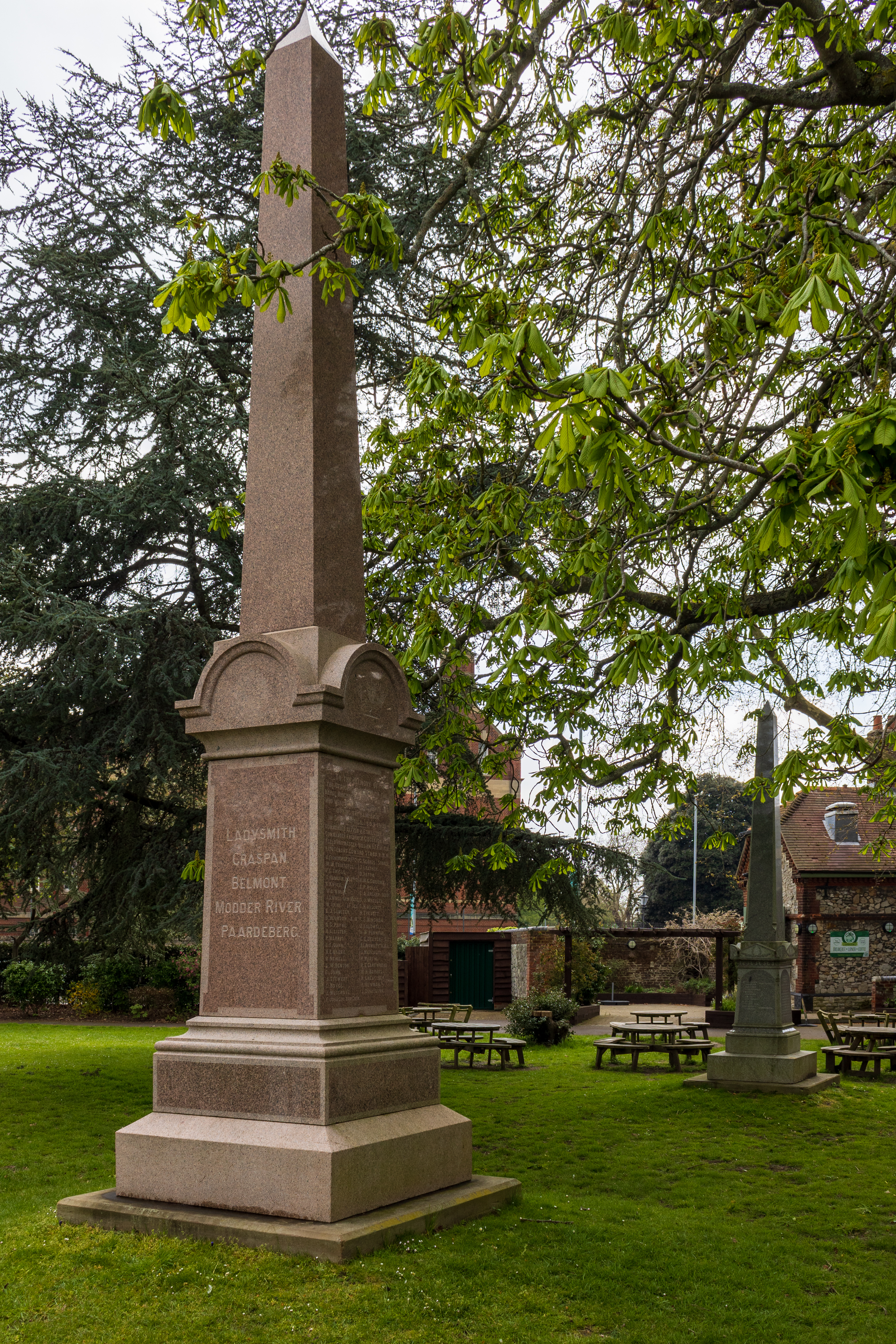
HMS Powerful memorial, Grade II listed

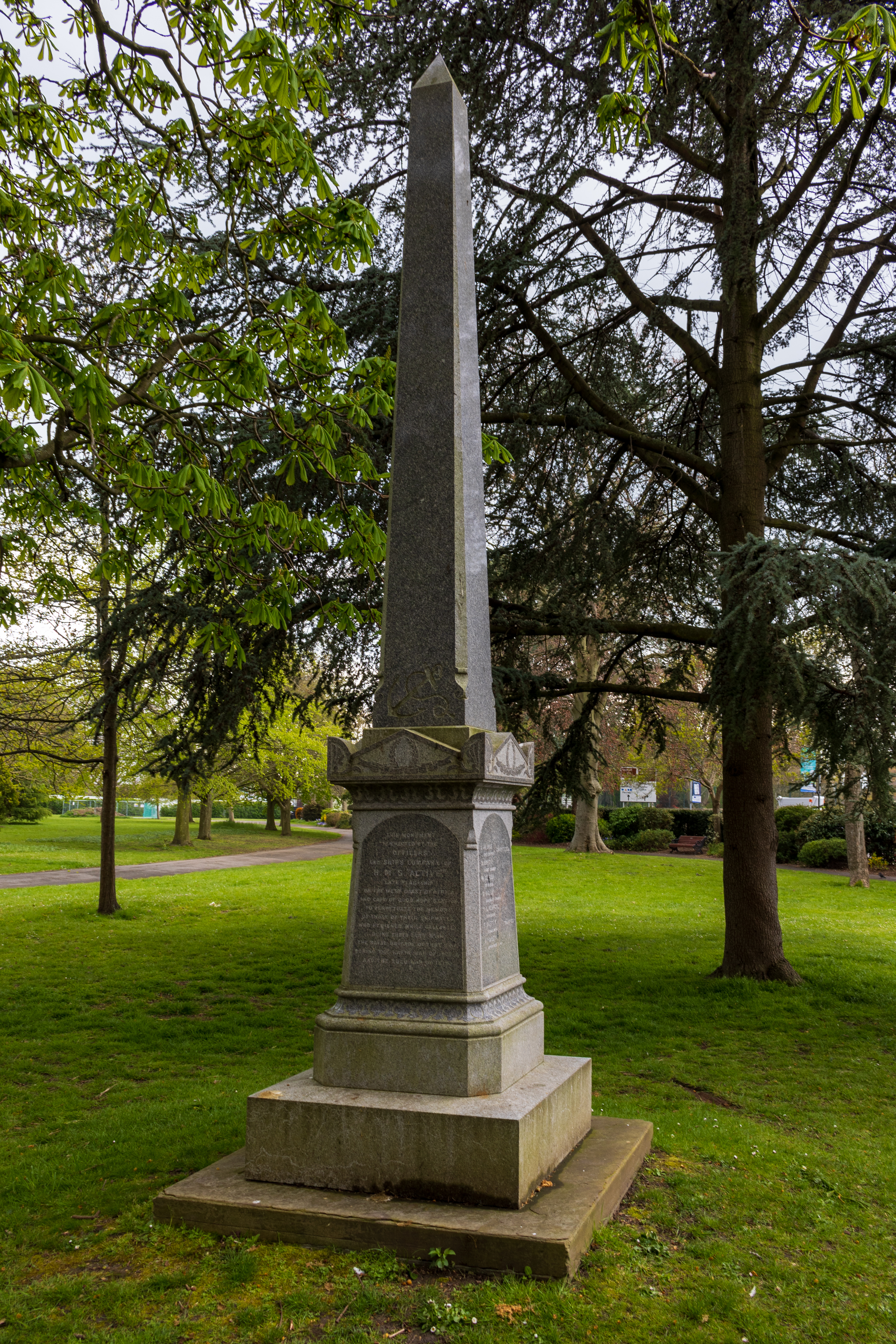
HMS Active memorial, Grade II listed

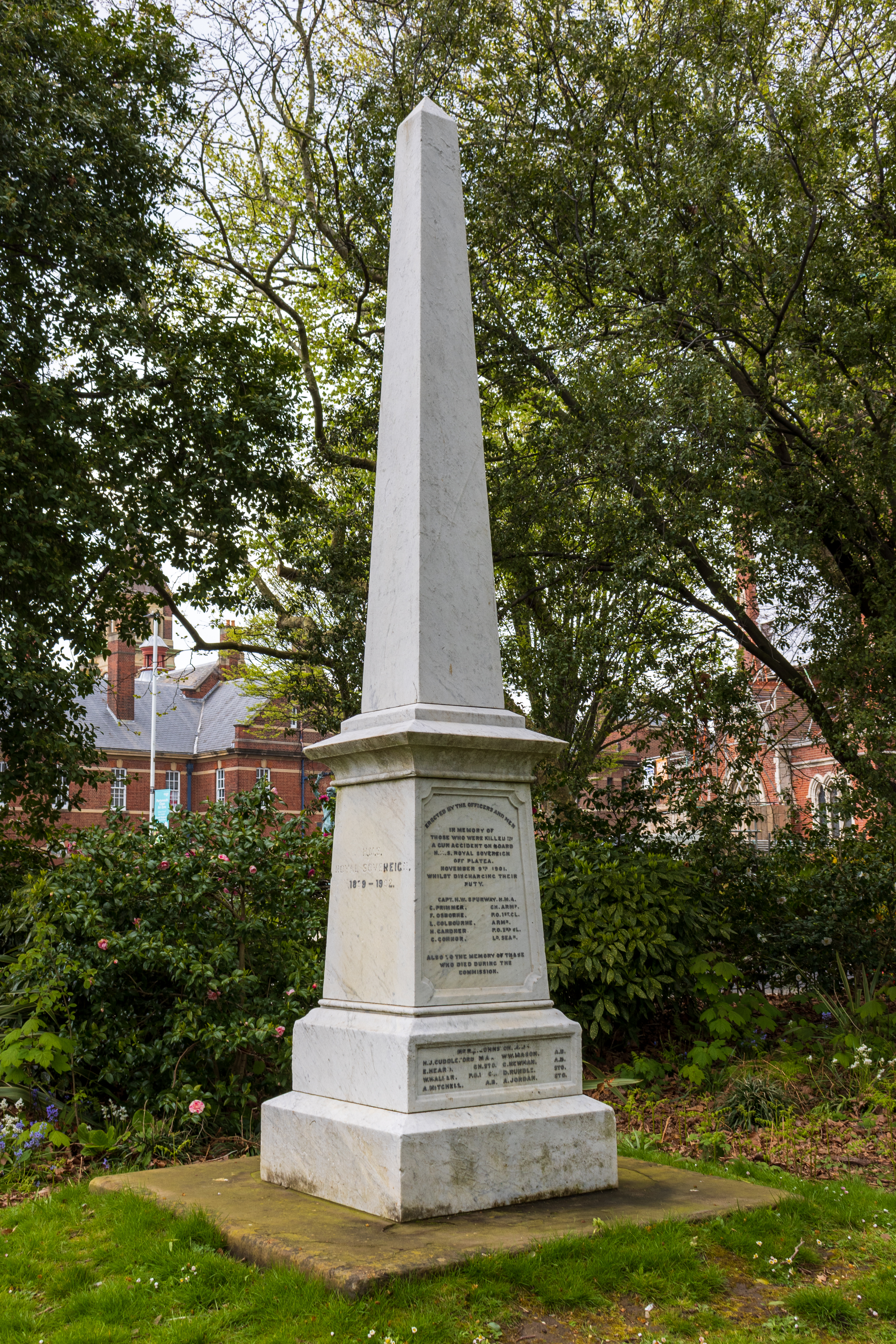
HMS Royal Sovereign memorial, Grade II listed

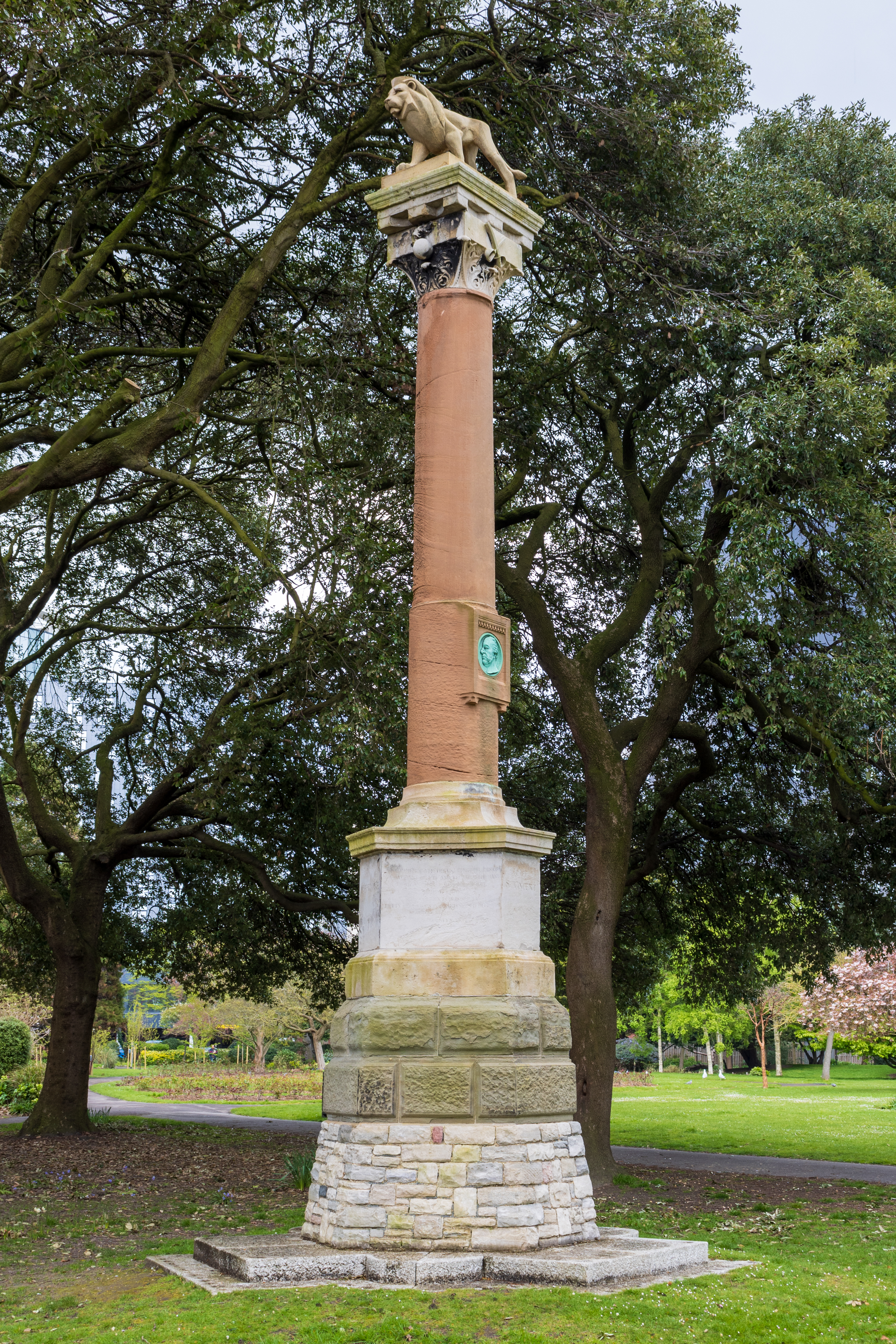
Monument to Admiral Napier, Grade II listed

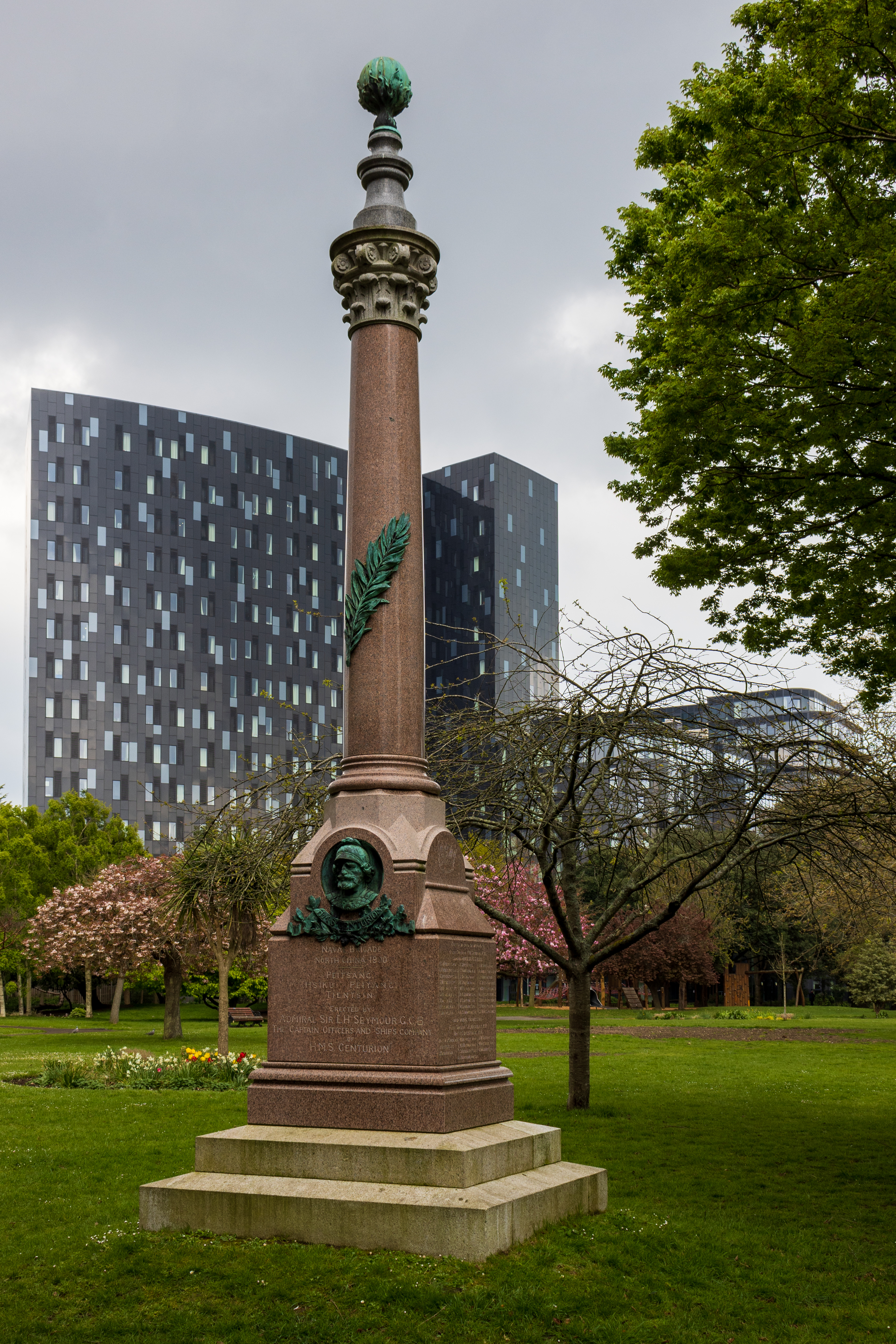
HMS Centurion memorial, Grade II listed
