= Isleworth Crown Court =

Judicial building in Isleworth, west London, England

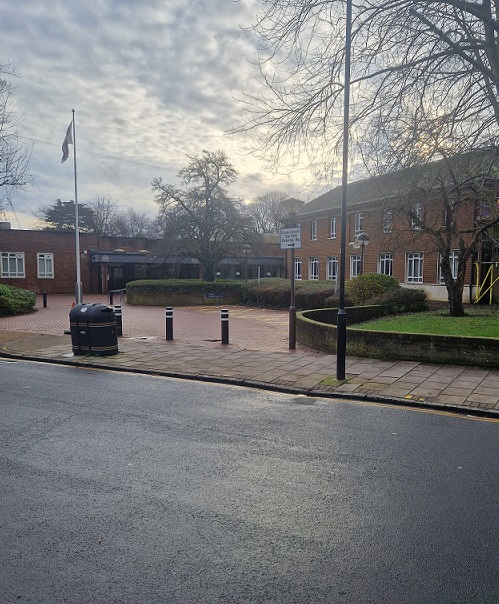
- Isleworth Crown Court

- Shown in London
- 51.4791°N 0.3400°W
- Location: Ridgeway Road, Isleworth, Greater London

History
- Built: 1949

Site notes
- Architectural style: Neo-Georgian style

Isleworth Crown Court is a Crown Court centre which deals with criminal cases at 36 Ridgeway Road, Isleworth, London.

== History ==
The site was originally occupied by three large manor houses. However, following the Second World War, the Ministry of Pensions and National Insurance acquired the site and demolished the houses with the intention of commissioning a hostel for paraplegics on the site. The main administration block was designed in the Neo-Georgian style, built in red brick and was officially opened as "Duchess of Gloucester House" by Princess Alice, Duchess of Gloucester in November 1949. The design involved a symmetrical main frontage of seven bays facing onto Ridgeway Road. The central bay featured a stone panel engraved with the Royal cypher of King George VI. The building was fenestrated with tripartite casement windows on the ground floor and bi-partite casement windows on the first floor. In the late 1970s, the UK Government decided that such specialist support was no longer required, the residents were re-housed and the hostel was closed.

Until the 1980s, the principal criminal court for north London was the Middlesex Guildhall in Parliament Square. However, as the number of criminal cases in north London grew, it became necessary to commission a dedicated courthouse for west London. The former hostel was then transferred to the ownership of the Lord Chancellor's Department and converted into a courthouse at a cost of £4.4 million. In December 2006, the department secured planning consent for an extension large enough to accommodate six extra courtrooms. The extension was built by Geoffrey Osborne and was opened in December 2009.

Notable cases heard at the court have included the trial and conviction, in 2011, of 24 members a notorious English football hooligan firm known as the Chelsea Headhunters, who were accused of taking part in violence, which resulted in several people being injured, including a police officer whose jaw was broken. Cases also included the trial and acquittal, in 2013, of sisters, Elisabetta and Francesca Grillo, former personal assistants to Nigella Lawson and her ex-husband Charles Saatchi, who were accused of using their credit cards, specifically without special authorisation, on the account of Saatchi's private company.

== Judges ==
- Suzanne Norwood, resident from 1986
