= Alexander Dundas Young Arbuthnott =

Royal Navy Admiral (1789–1871)

Admiral Sir Alexander Arbuthnott
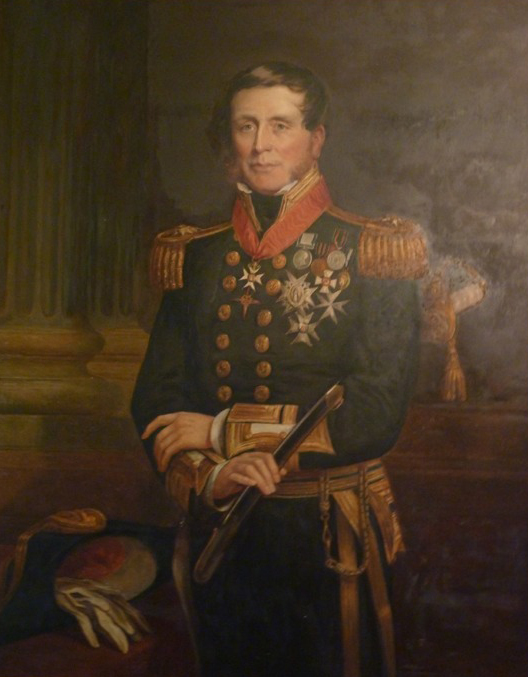
- Born: 1789; Forton, Hampshire, England
- Died: 8 May 1871; Leicester
- Military career
- Allegiance: United Kingdom
- Branch: Royal Navy
- Service years: 1803–1846
- Rank: Admiral
- Conflicts: Napoleonic Wars; Battle of Trafalgar; Battle of Copenhagen
- Awards: Naval General Service Medal, clasp Trafalgar; Knight Commander of the Russian Order of Saint George, 1823; Knight Commander of the Spanish Order of Charles III, 1837; Turkish gold medal and Order of Medjidie, 1842; Knight Bachelor, 1859

Admiral Sir Alexander Dundas Young Arbuthnott (bapt. 5 March 1789 – 8 May 1871) was a British Royal Navy officer of the Victorian era.

== Background ==
Born in Forton, Hampshire, he was the son of Robert Arbuthnott, grandson of Robert Arbuthnot, 1st Viscount of Arbuthnott, and his wife Cordelia, daughter of Hon. James Murray.

== Career ==
Arbuthnott entered the Royal Navy in 1803 and served as a midshipman aboard the warship HMS Mars at the Battle of Trafalgar in 1805. He was present at the capture of Le Rhin in 1806 and that of four French frigates off Rochefort by Sir Samuel Hood, 1st Baronet's Squadron in the same year. Arbuthnott was with the expedition to Copenhagen in 1807, was at the capture of Antwerp, and escorted the Emperor of Russia and the King of Prussia to England in 1814.

He was commander of the Jasper, a 10-gun sloop-of-war, on a mission to Saint Petersburg in 1823. In the following year, Arbuthnott was in the Redwing and was appointed a Gentleman of the Privy Chamber. He then commanded HMS Terror and served in the Syrian Campaign of 1840. Arbuthnott was promoted to vice-admiral in 1858 and was created a Knight Bachelor a year later.

Sir Alexander was Grand Prior of the Sovereign and Illustrious Order of St John of Jerusalem, Anglia 1860–61. He was invested as a Knight Commander of the Royal and Distinguished Spanish Order of Carlos III and held the same rank in the Russian Military Order of the Saint Grand Martyr and the Triumphant George.

He was ultimately promoted to full admiral on the Retired List in 1863 before his death in 1871.

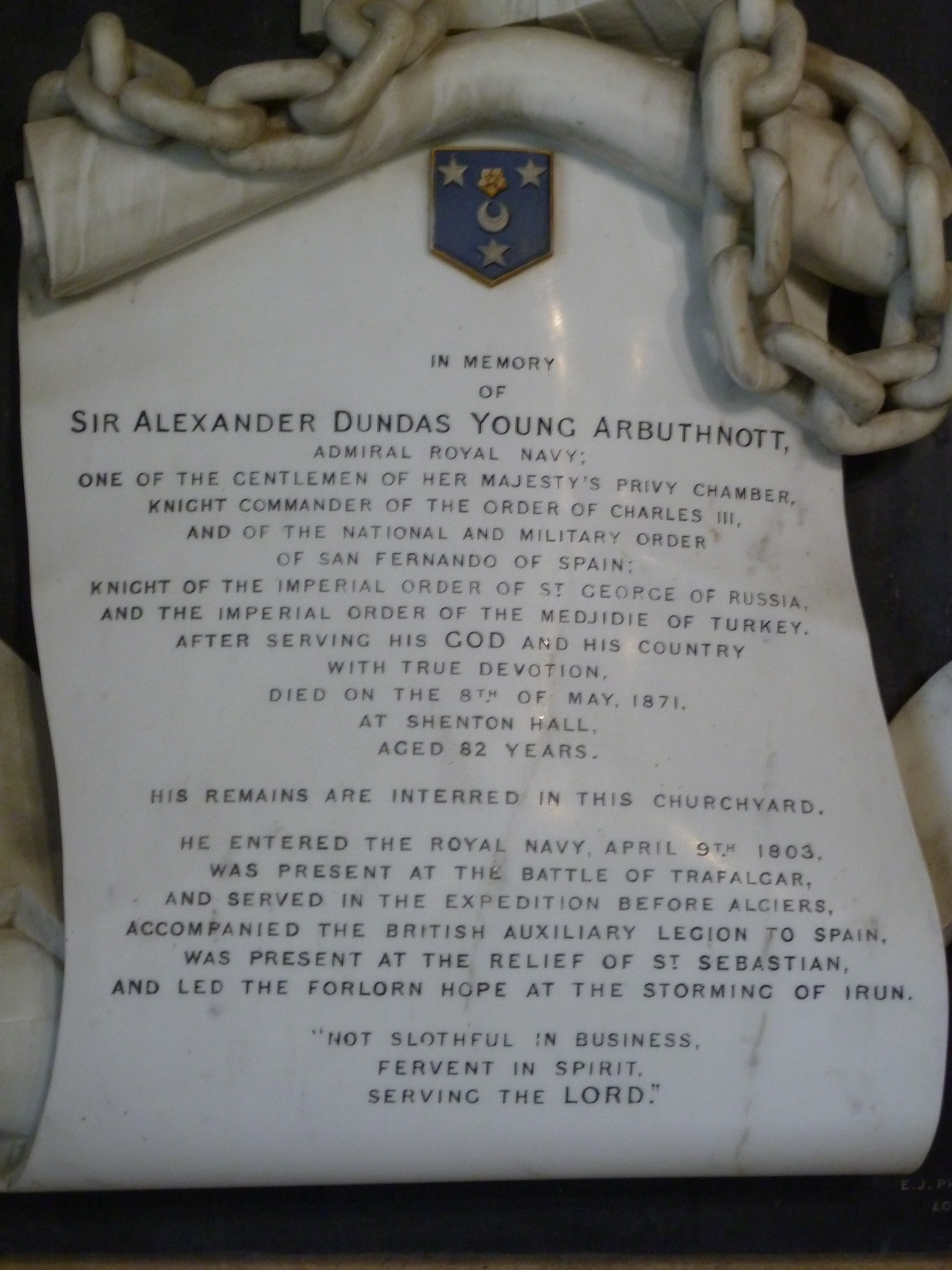

== Family ==
In 1827, Arbuthnott married in Kildare Catherine Maria ("Mary") Eustace (born about 1806 in Ireland; still alive in 1891 living in Sheepy Magna, Leicestershire), third daughter of Rev. Charles Eustace and descendant of the Viscounts Baltinglass. They had a daughter, Josette Eliza Jane Arbuthnot (born about 1829 in France; died 12 January 1909; married Major Frederick Wollaston).

Arbuthnott died in 1871 in Leicester. He is buried in Shenton, Leicestershire.
