= Middlesex Guildhall =

Building of the Supreme Court of the United Kingdom in London

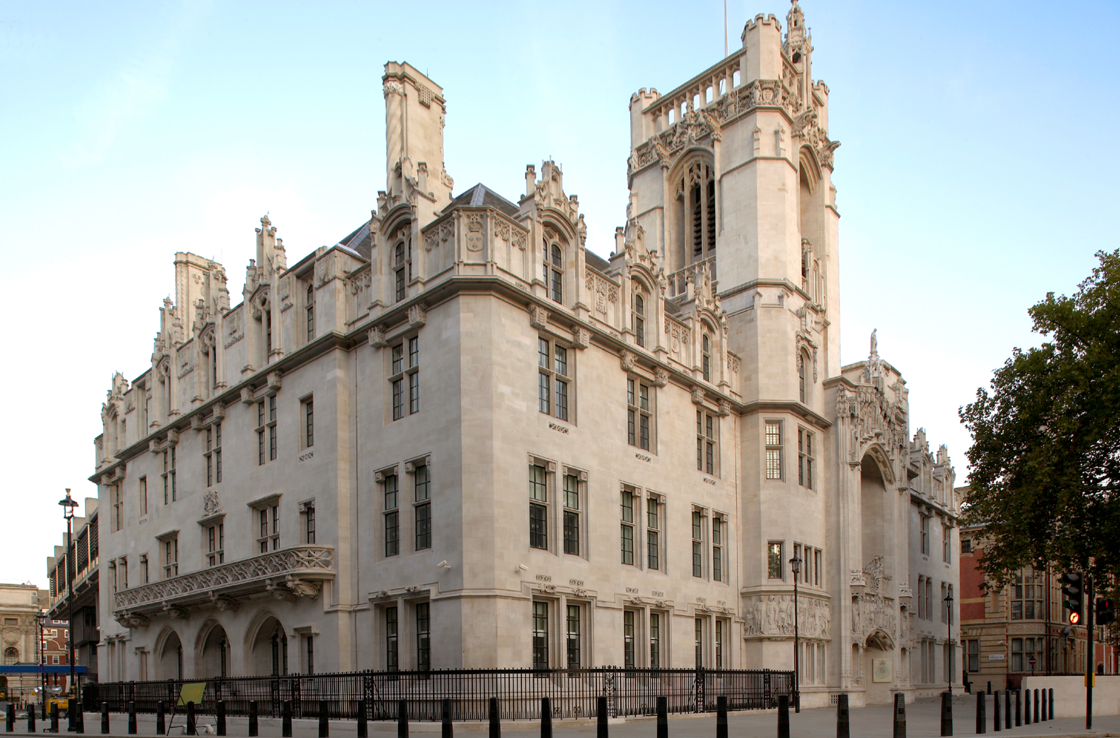
- The exterior of Middlesex Guildhall seen from Broad Sanctuary

General information
- Status: Completed
- Type: Court
- Architectural style: Gothic revival with Flemish-Burgundian references
- Location: Parliament Square, London, SW1
- Coordinates: 51°30′01.5″N 00°07′40.8″W
- Current tenants: Supreme Court of the UK; Judicial Committee of the Privy Council
- Construction started: 1906
- Opened: 1913; 113 years ago
- Owner: Ministry of Justice

Technical details
- Material: Portland stone with slate roofing

Design and construction
- Architect: James Glen Sivewright Gibson
- Other designers: Henry Charles Fehr (Sculptor)

Renovating team
- Architect: Feilden + Mawson supported by Foster and Partners (2007–2009)

Other information
- Public transit: Westminster

Website
- Official website

Listed Building – Grade II*
- Official name: Middlesex Guildhall
- Designated: 5 February 1970
- Reference no.: 1226369

The Middlesex Guildhall is a historic court building in Westminster which now houses the Supreme Court of the United Kingdom and the Judicial Committee of the Privy Council. The building stands on the south-western corner of Parliament Square, near the Palace of Westminster. In 1970, the building was listed Grade II*.

Constructed in the early 20th century, the building was designed by Scottish architect J. S. Gibson and sculpted by British artist Henry Fehr. The guildhall is described by Historic England as Neo-Gothic with Flemish-Burgundian references.

Initially serving as an administrative centre for Middlesex County Council and as a court of quarter session, it has undergone several iterations. The building later served as a Crown Court centre, until the establishment of the Supreme Court in the early 21st century.

== History ==
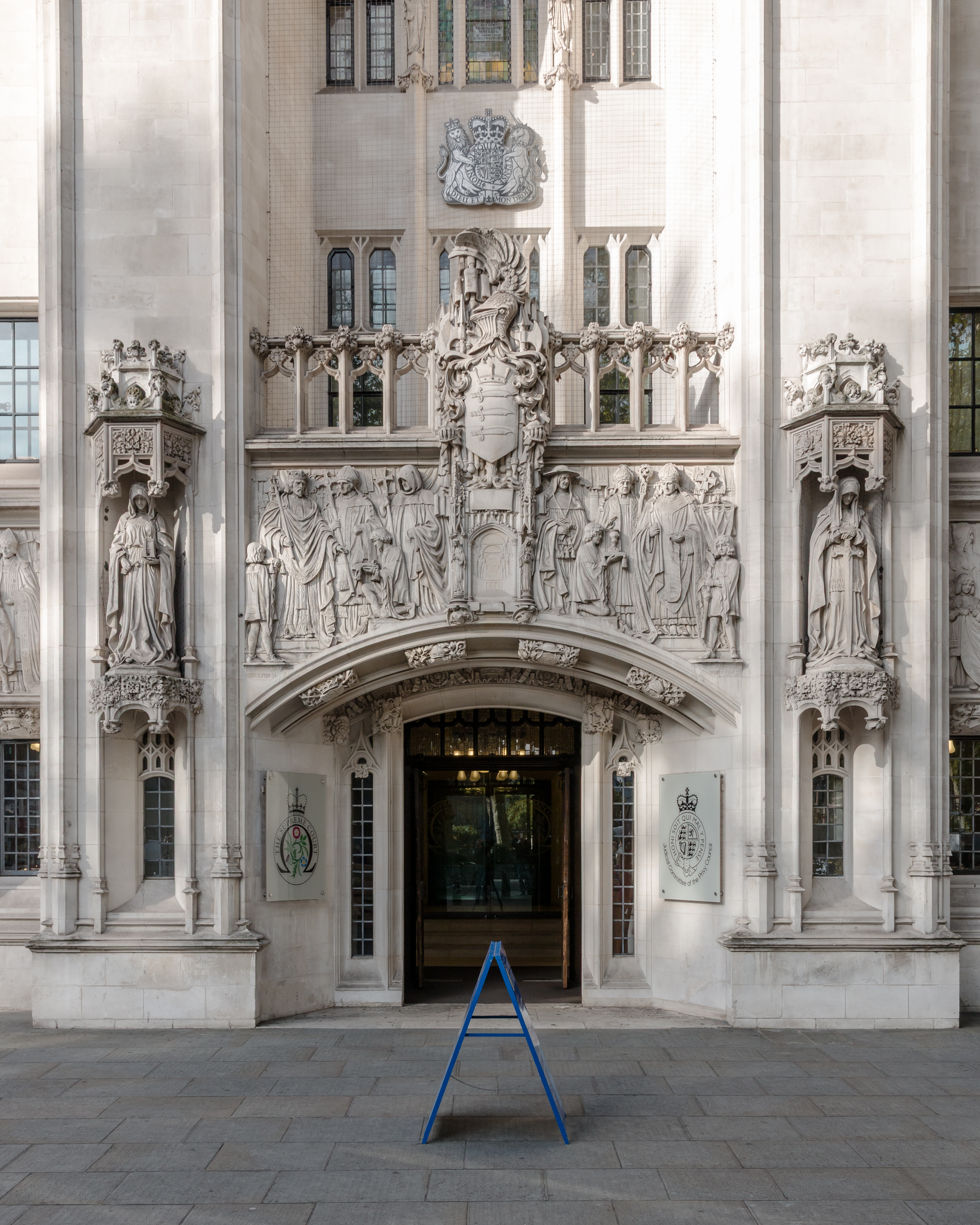
Detail of the façade

The site on the south-western corner of Parliament Square was originally the belfry of Westminster Abbey. The first guildhall, designed as an octagon with a Doric portico by Samuel Pepys Cockerell, was built for the justices of the City and Liberty of Westminster and opened as the "Westminster Sessions House" or "Westminster Guildhall" in 1805.

In 1889 Westminster became part of the County of London, outside of the jurisdiction of the county of Middlesex. In the division of property between the Middlesex and London county councils, the guildhall at Westminster went to Middlesex in exchange for the Sessions House in Clerkenwell which went to London. In addition to being a facility for dispensing justice, following the implementation of the Local Government Act 1888, which established county councils in every county, the Guildhall also became the administrative headquarters and meeting place for Middlesex County Council.

Middlesex county leaders decided, in the context of their increased responsibilities, that the first Guildhall was inadequate for their purposes, and a second Guildhall, designed by F. H. Pownall in the neo-Tudor style, was constructed on the site in 1893.

After the county leaders found that the second Guildhall was actually too small, the current and third Guildhall, designed by J. S. Gibson, was built between 1906 and 1913. The architectural historian, Nikolaus Pevsner, described the design as "art nouveau gothic style". The design involved a symmetrical main frontage of nine bays facing Parliament Square; the central section of three bays which slightly projected forwards, featured an ornate arched doorway with a segmental arched window spanning the first and second floors and a tower above. A 17th century door, which had originally been part of the Tothill Fields Bridewell prison, was installed in the basement of the building. The building was decorated with medieval-style gargoyles and other architectural sculptures by Henry Charles Fehr.

Following the implementation of the London Government Act 1963, Middlesex County Council and the Middlesex sessions were abolished in 1965, but the Guildhall continued to be used by the Greater London Quarter Sessions. After the abolition of the Quarter Sessions in 1972, it was used as a venue of the Crown Court. The Guildhall ceased to be operate as a Crown Court following the completion of new courthouses in London such as Harrow Crown Court, Isleworth Crown Court and Knightsbridge Crown Court in the 1980s and 1990s.

== Renovation ==
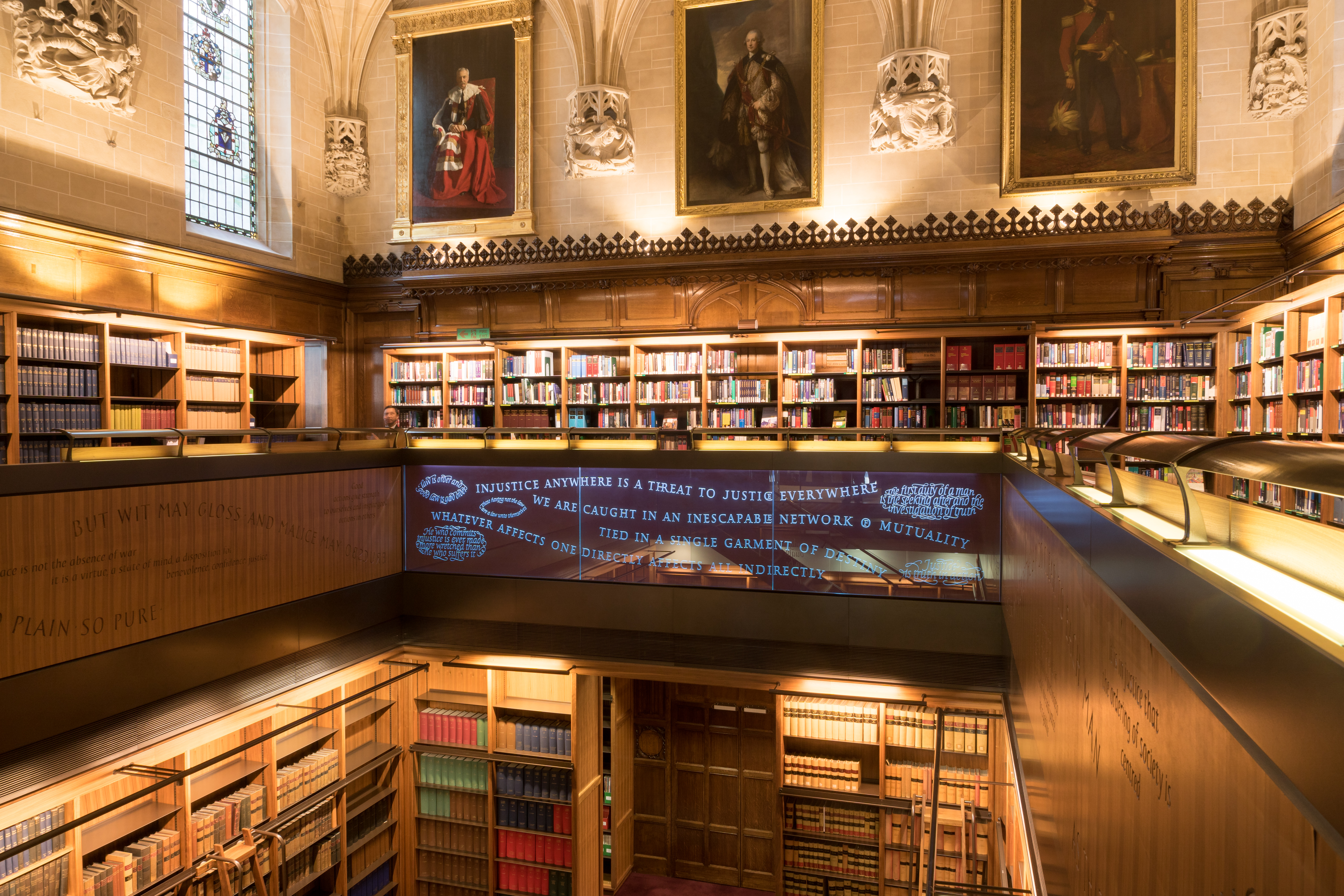
Justices' library in the Supreme Court building

The Middlesex Guildhall was closed for refurbishment in 2007 to convert it for use as the site of the new Supreme Court of the United Kingdom and the Judicial Committee of the Privy Council. The Supreme Court, established in law by the Constitutional Reform Act 2005, started operations on 1 October 2009.

Save Britain's Heritage opposed the conversion, unsuccessfully challenged it in court, and subsequently claimed the renovation had resulted in the destruction of original interiors and unique fittings. The Middlesex Guildhall is a Grade II* listed building, and in 2004, prior to renovation, the statement of importance by English Heritage had classed the three main Court interiors as "unsurpassed by any other courtroom of the period in terms of the quality and completeness of their fittings".

The renovation plans were developed by architecture firm Feilden and Mawson. As part of the refurbishment, new carpets designed by Sir Peter Blake, featuring a reinterpretation of the Supreme Court's official badge, were laid in the building.

== See also ==
- Guild
