= George Glasse =

English scholar

George Henry Glasse
- Born: 1761; Hanwell, London, England
- Died: 30 October 1809 (aged 47–48)
- Occupations: Chaplain, writer, classicist

George Henry Glasse (1761 – 30 October 1809) was an Oxford Greek and Latin scholar, domestic chaplain to the Duke of Cambridge.

== Biography ==
Glasse was the son of Dr. Samuel Glasse, rector of St. Mary's in Hanwell, London and grew up in the rectory. He attended Christ Church, Oxford, receiving degrees in 1779 and in 1782, and succeeded his father as rector of St Mary's, Hanwell in 1785, having "distinguished himself very early in life by his uncommon proficiency in Hebrew literature."

Glasse served as the domestic chaplain to Adolphus Frederick, Duke of Cambridge, the seventh son of George III. Involved in Poor Law reform, he was described as a man "whose learning, abilities, and good principles, have already entitled him to the thanks of his country, and will secure his fame with posterity".

He acquired recognition as a classical scholar with his translation of William Mason's Caractacus, and John Milton's Samson Agonistes into ancient Greek. In a different vein he published a novel entitled The Affecting History of Louisa: The Wandering Maniac, or, Lady of the Hay-Stack; so called, from having taken up her residence under that shelter, in the village of Bourton, near Bristol, in a state of melancholy derangement; and supposed to be a natural daughter of Francis I, emperor of Germany, a real tale of woe. Partly translated from an anonymous French work, L'inconnue, histoire véritable it was an attempt to prove that a mysterious refugee at Bristol was identical with Félix-Julienne de Schonau, otherwise Freulen, who claimed to be the natural daughter of the emperor Francis I. The work was popular enough to go into three editions. He also frequently contributed to The Gentleman's Magazine, which in 1805 published an amusing Latin translation by him of a popular comic song, Unfortunate Miss Bailey, composed to be sung by Thomas Moore at a fashionable masquerade. A version of this work found posthumously among the papers of James Joyce was briefly ascribed to him as an original composition.

Glasse built himself a new home called The Hermitage in 1809 on Church Road in Hanwell, London. It survives still, and is executed in the rustic style of cottage orné and has a grade II English Heritage listing. It is described by Nikolaus Pevsner's Buildings of England as "a peach of an early C19th Gothic thatched cottage with two pointed windows, a quatrefoil, and an ogee arched door, all on a minute scale. Inside, an octagonal hall and reception room". The style is influenced by the Brighton Pavilion, where Glasse had permission to use the royal pew of the chapel.

Glasse built The Hermitage on borrowed funds. As he had extensive correspondence with Prince Edward, Duke of Kent and Strathearn, Glasse most likely planned for the cottage to be acquired by a member of the royal family or the literati of the time, many of whom spent time in the nearby mansions of Chiswick, Richmond and Twickenham. When this enterprise failed to materialise Glasse faced financial ruin and, as described by Hester Thrale in her memoirs, went to the city to obtain one last loan to cover his debts. On stopping for sustenance at the Bull and Mouth Inn in St Martin's Le Grand, he realised that he had left the entire sum in the hackney cab that had brought him there, and hanged himself at the Inn on 30 October 1809, predeceasing his father by 3 years. Ironically, the driver returned the money to the hostel the following day.

Glasse has a memorial in the churchyard of St. Mary's Hanwell, the church where he was rector from 1785 to 1809, commemorated by a neo-classical tomb.

== Family ==
In November 1783, Glasse married his cousin Anne Fletcher, and they had seven children. A year after her death in 1802, he was engaged briefly to Elizabeth de Blaquiere, who broke off the engagement. In 1804 he pursued Lady Anastasia Jessey Gascoigne of St. Petersburg, who had separated from her industrialist husband Charles Gascoigne. In October 1805, he married Harriet Wheeler, by whom he had one more child.
