= Hanwell =

Town in London, England

Coordinates: 51.509°N 0.338°W

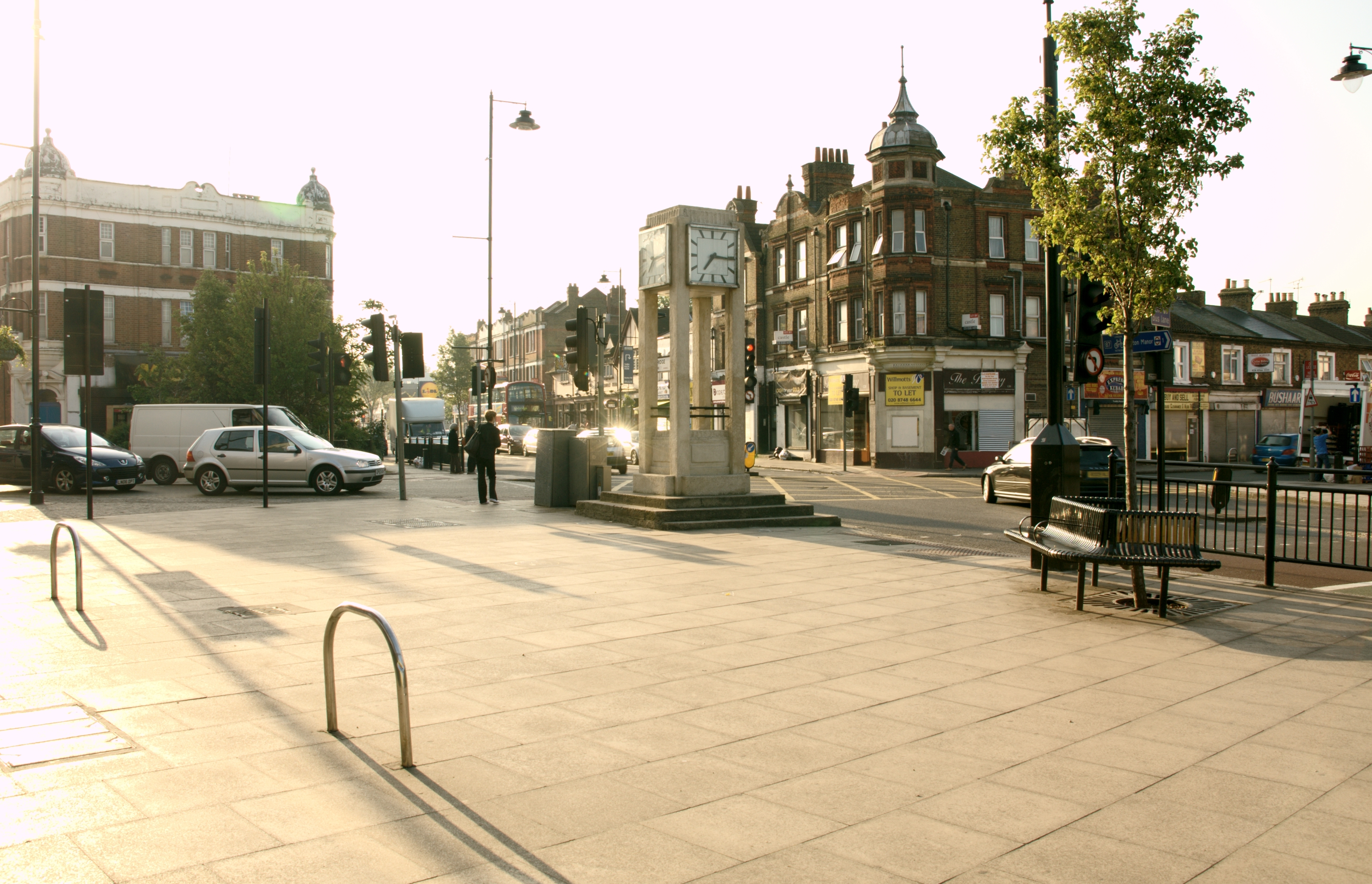
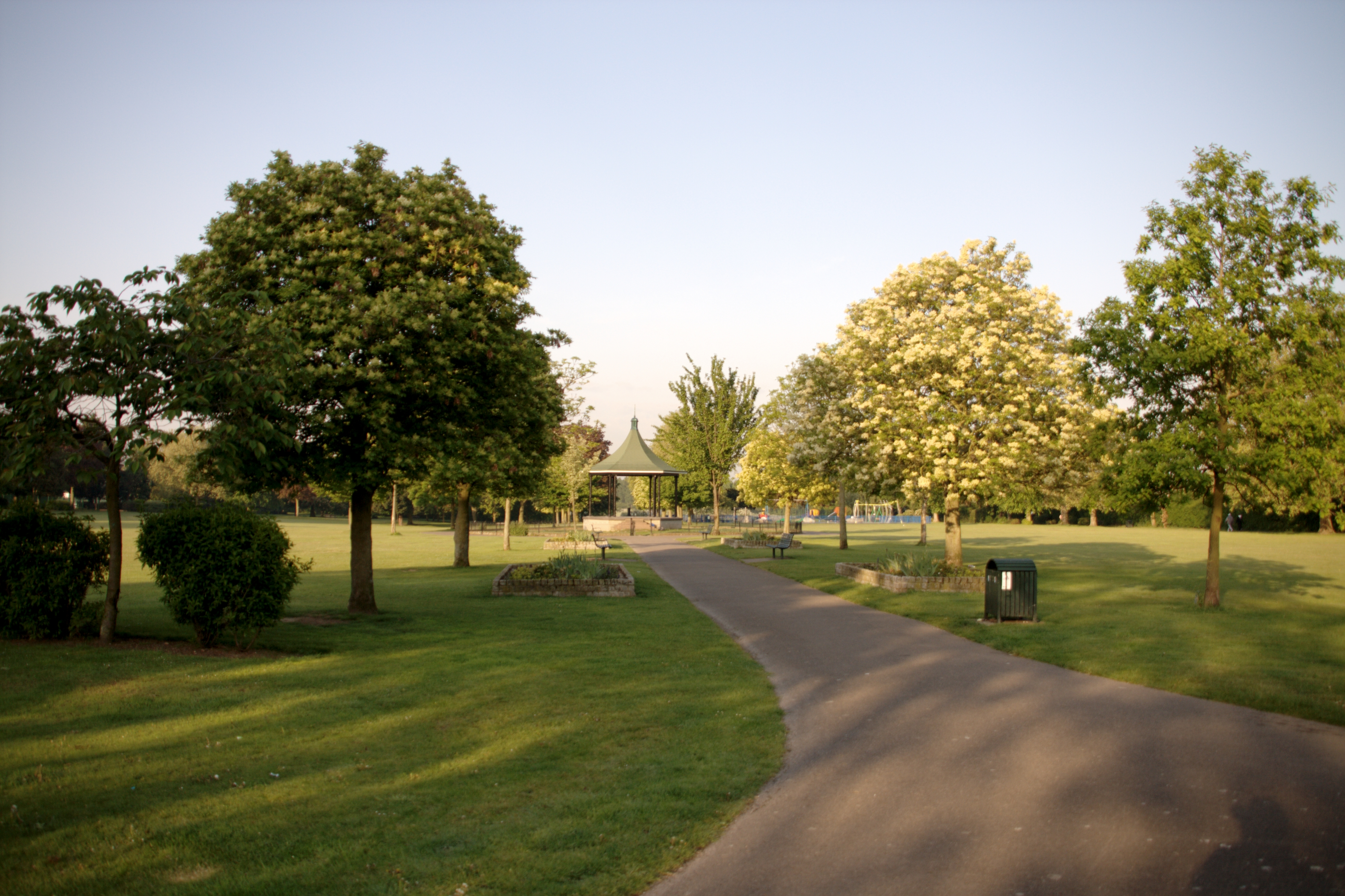
- From top to bottom: Hanwell Broadway looking east-south-east; Elthorne Park

- Location within Greater London
- Population: 28,768 (2011 Census
- OS grid reference: TQ153802
- London borough: Ealing
- Ceremonial county: Greater London
- Region: London
- Country: England
- Sovereign state: United Kingdom
- Post town: LONDON
- Postcode district: W7
- Dialling code: 020
- Police: Metropolitan
- Fire: London
- Ambulance: London
- UK Parliament: Ealing North; Ealing Southall
- London Assembly: Ealing and Hillingdon

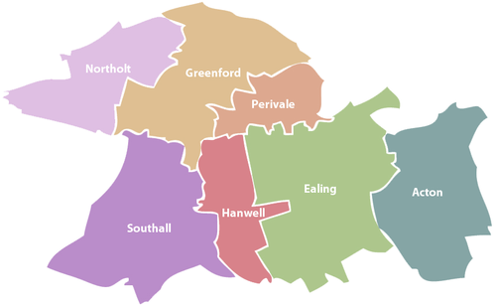
Map of the London Borough of Ealing, showing Hanwell and the other seven "towns" which make up the borough.

Hanwell (/ˈhænwɛl/) is a town in the London Borough of Ealing. It is about 1.5 miles (2.4 km) west of Ealing Broadway and had a population of 28,768 as of 2011. It is the westernmost location of the London post town.

Hanwell is mentioned in the Domesday Book of 1086. St Mary's Church was established in the tenth century and has been rebuilt three times since, the present church dating to 1842. Schools were established around this time in Hanwell; notably Central London District School which Charlie Chaplin attended. By the end of the 19th century there were over one thousand houses in Hanwell. The Great Western Railway came in 1838 and Hanwell railway station opened. Later the trams of London United Tramways came on the Uxbridge Road in 1904, running from Chiswick to Southall. From 1894 it was its own urban district of Middlesex until being absorbed into Ealing Urban District in 1926.

To its west flows the River Brent, which marks Hanwell's boundary with Southall. There are several green spaces including Brent Valley Park, Elthorne Park and Cuckoo Park; meanwhile, the Hanwell Zoo is a popular local attraction featuring small mammals, birds and other wildlife. Its elevation is approximately 49 feet (15 m). The town holds its own annual Hanwell Carnival, London's oldest carnival.

== History ==
On 1 October 1926 the civil parish was abolished and merged with Ealing. At the 1921 census (the last before the abolition of the parish), Hanwell St Mary had a population of 20,481.

=== Etymology ===
The name probably means 'spring/stream frequented by cocks'.

The earliest surviving reference is AD 959 when it is recorded as Hanewelle in pledge, when Alfwyn (a Saxon) pawned his land for money to go on a pilgrimage. The origin of the name is uncertain; various suggestions have been put forward.

Near to the old Rectory and close to Hanwell spring is a large stone of about a ton in weight. In Anglo-Saxon the word Han denoted a boundary stone. This juxtaposition of these two natural features could have given rise to the name Han-well, which dates back to before the Domesday Book.

The original borders of the parish stretched from the bend of the River Brent at Greenford and followed the river down to the River Thames. Its geography, before the draining of the marshes, formed a natural boundary between the different tribes of the south east of England. This gives some support to the suggestion that Han came from the Saxon han for cockerel. If so, the name is derived from Han-créd-welle. Han-créd or cock-crow meant the border between night and day, and is neither one nor the other. So Hanwell would mean well upon the boundary. For more see: River Brent: Hydronymy.

The only other Hanwell in Britain is a small parish in Oxfordshire on the boundary with Warwickshire.

=== Short history of the inns and public houses ===
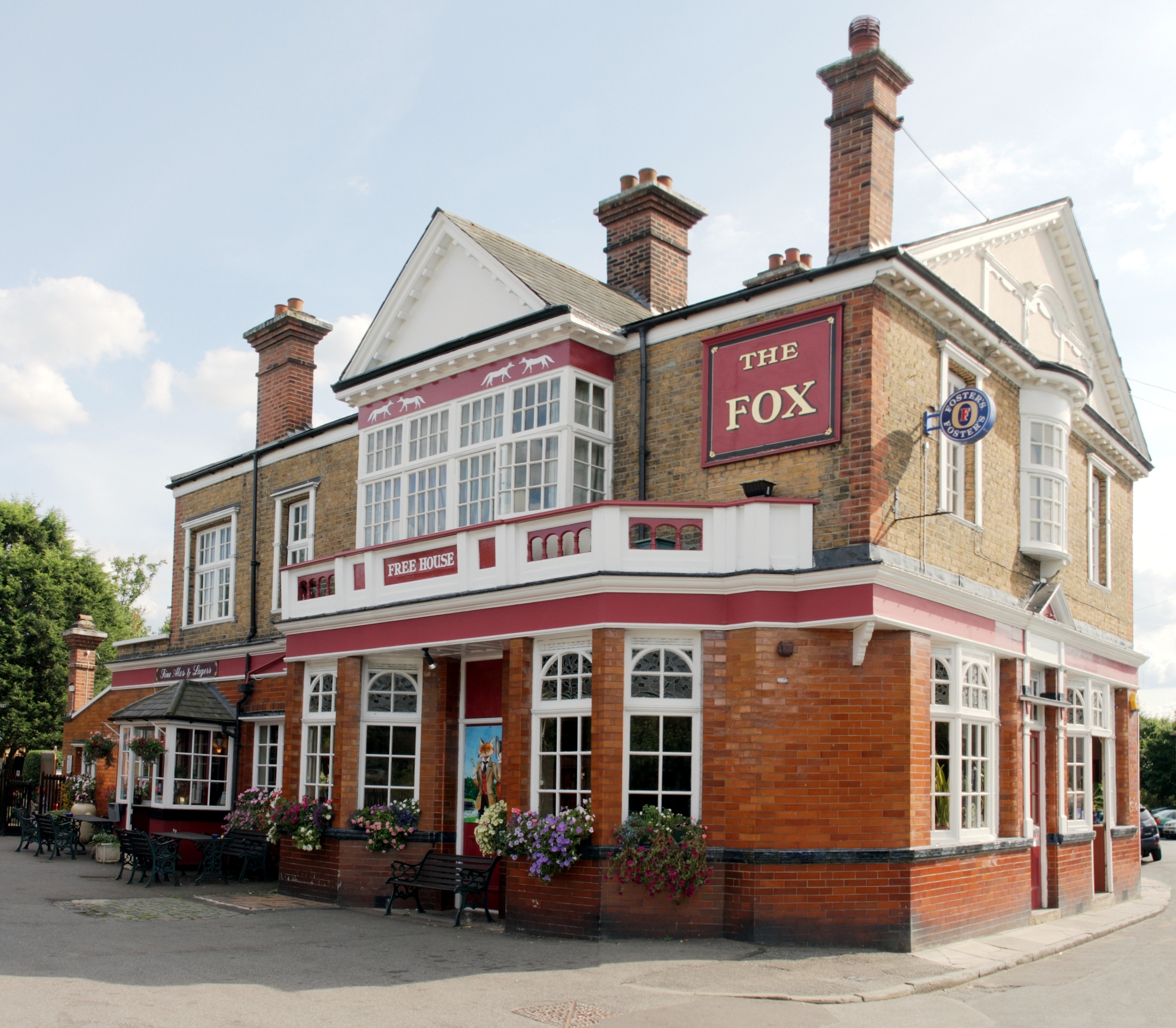
The Fox, built in 1848

The Uxbridge Road (then known as the Oxford Road) was turnpiked between Uxbridge and Tyburn in 1714. The revenue from tolls enabled an all-weather metaled road surface of compacted gravel to be laid down.

This constant movement of people along the road, brought about the establishment of coaching inns along the road as it crossed the River Brent and passed through the parish of Hanwell. In these inns, travellers could stable their horses, place their carts or goods in safe storage and secure board and lodgings for themselves overnight.

The first inn on crossing the River Brent is "The Viaduct", which is on the north side. Named after the Wharncliffe Viaduct, its original name was the "Coach and Horses". At the back of the pub, some of the original stable building can be seen, dating to about 1730. Early in the 20th century, The Viaduct received a new faïence façade, which Nikolaus Pevsner succinctly described as "a jolly tiled Edwardian pub".

Next was the "Duke of Wellington", which lay approximately 400 m closer to London on the southern side of the road, roughly opposite the old Hanwell Police Station. However, this had been demolished by the 1920s and was not rebuilt.

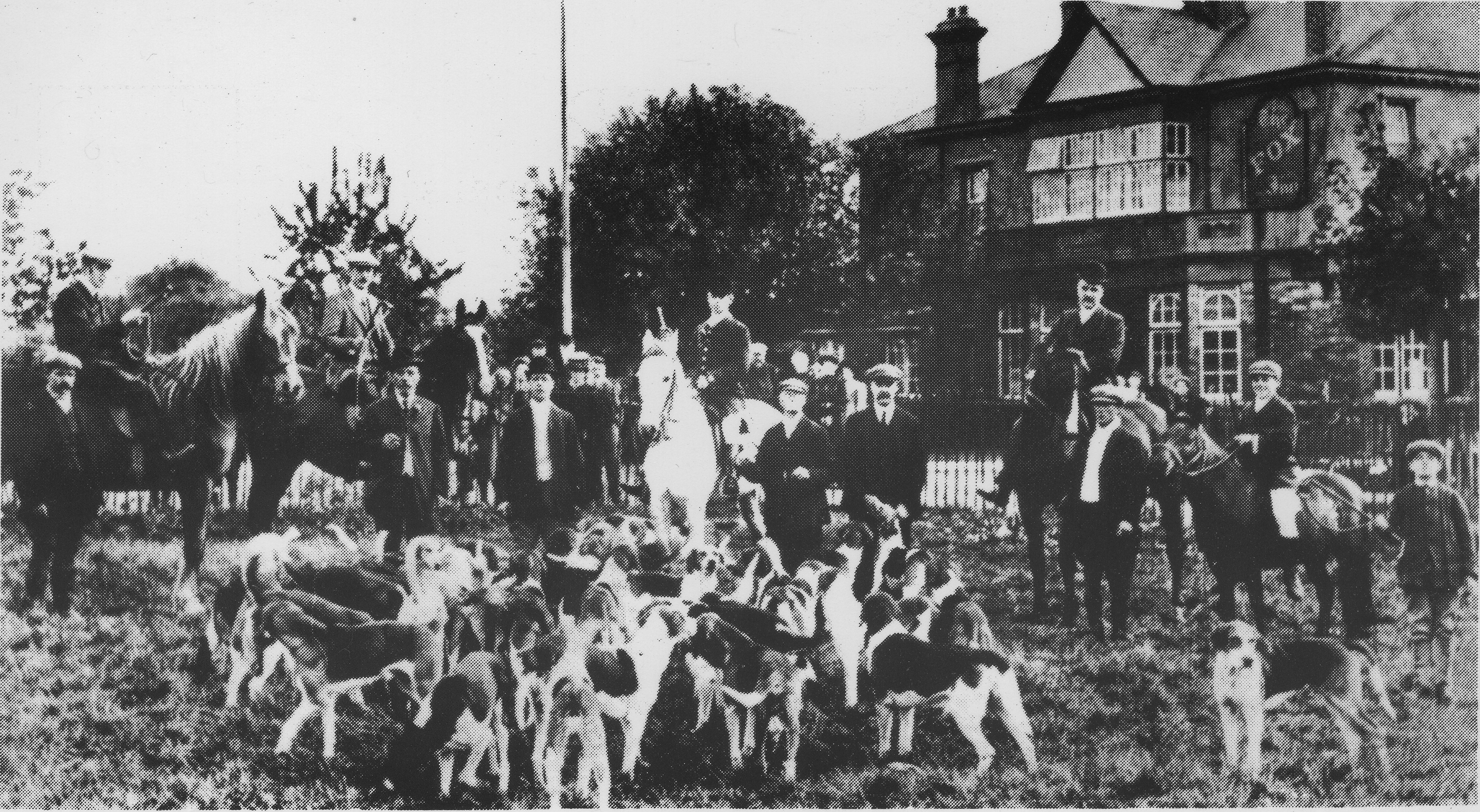
The hunt assembled. c.1910

Further east still and back across on the north side of the Uxbridge Road at the junction of Hanwell Broadway is the "Duke of York". This became an important staging point for stagecoaches on their way between Oxford and London. Established in the 18th century, it has been subsequently rebuilt in the Tudorbethan style.

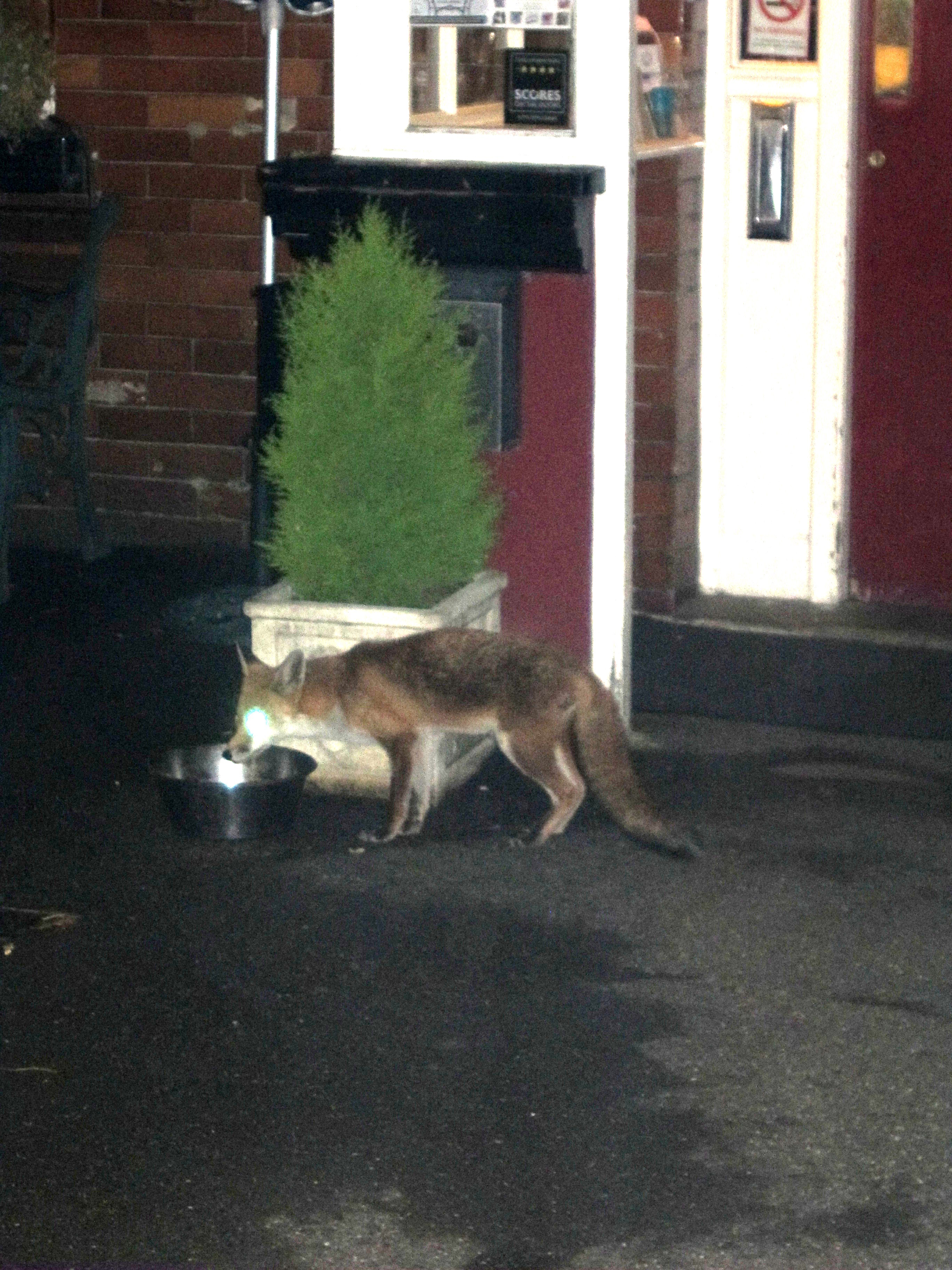
Now foxes come to drink from the dog bowls, outside The Fox's saloon bar

The next pub occupies the site of what was probably the very first inn to be established on the Oxford Road as it ran through Hanwell; it is known today as the Kings Arms. It lies on the south side of the road. It was original called the "Spencer Arms" after Edward Spencer, who was Lord of the manor of Boston during the Civil War. In the 18th century, the Manor Courts hearings were transferred here from Greenford, then later transferred to the Viaduct Inn. However, the present building dates back to 1930 when it was rebuilt by brewers Mann, Crossman & Paulin in the Arts & Crafts style. Though unexciting on the outside, its interior is still today, a fine example of this type of architecture, and CAMRA has placed it in its National Inventory of Pub Interiors of Outstanding Historic Interest.

Gradually, retail stores and shops started to fill the gaps between these inns to take advantage of the passing trade brought by this important route into and out of the city. During the Victorian period, the village to the north of the Uxbridge Road began to slowly expand to the south of the road. Toward the southern end of Green Lane (the old toll-free drovers route into the city) is The Fox public house. The Fox has been named West Middlesex Pub of the Year in 2005, 2007, 2010 and 2011. Built in 1848 it is a largely unspoiled and original mid-Victorian pub. It has received a 'local listing' from Ealing Council as a building of local interest. It is constructed out of local golden yellow brick with more expensive red bricks used for detailing on corners and chimneys. Rich brown glazed tiles are used for the ground floor exterior walls with coloured stained glass in the fan lights. The upper story has Mock Tudor detailing, including dentils on the two outward-facing gables. Most of the interior is also original, although the dividing walls between bars and off-license sales have been taken out to create one large bar area. The present day eating area retains its original wooden wall panelling. On the east of the building itself is a sheltered beer garden. The Fox was the meeting place for the local fox hunt until the 1920s. The hunt would set off across Hanwell Heath, much of which still existed at that time.

Present-day clientele can still see foxes drinking, quite unfazed, from the dog bowls of water, put outside the Fox's saloon bar.

=== Healthcare ===
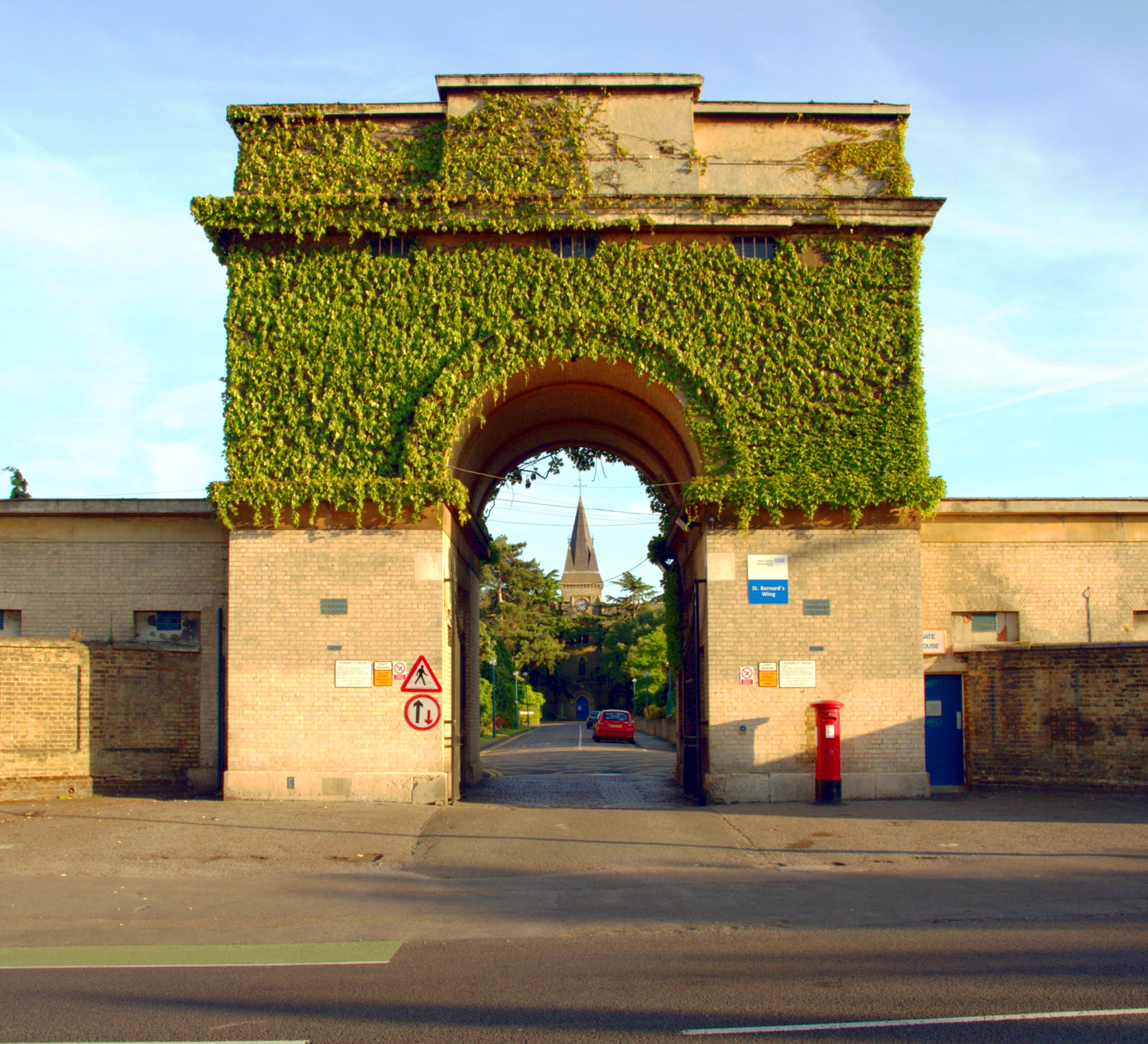
St Bernard's Gate House (Grade II)

Lying to the west of the River Brent and so actually in the precinct of Norwood Green, the Middlesex County Lunatic Asylum was commonly referred to as the Hanwell Asylum because it was closer to the centre of Hanwell than either Norwood or Southall. The asylum was opened in 1831 to house pauper lunatics. In 1937 it was renamed St Bernard's Hospital by which it is still known today. Built on some of its former grounds to the east is Ealing Hospital. Most of the original asylum still remains, with over half having been turned into the St Bernard's Gate housing development and the rest remaining as a psychiatric hospital. The most interesting parts are the chapel and an entrance arch, visible from the Uxbridge Road. Within the grounds of Hanwell Asylum, on the west side of the main block, was a small isolation hospital.

The hospital was remarkable as one of its physicians, John Conolly, 1794–1866, was progressive in the treatment of patients and avoided the use of restraints. A memorial garden dedicated to him is at the junction of Station Road with Connolly Road. The hospital did have a museum housed in its chapel, but this collection has now been broken up and relocated. It included many items ranging from patient registers, reports and a large assortment of medical equipment, including a padded cell, consisting of a wooden framework with padded door, walls and floor, but no ceiling.

Within the boundary of Hanwell proper, there were three more asylums. These were all private. The first one recorded, was "Popes House", which admitted its first patient (it is thought) in 1804.

Later, "Elm Grove House" in Church Road was turned into an asylum by Susan Wood. Her husband was the brother of Mrs Ellis, the wife of William Ellis, the first superintendent of Hanwell Asylum. (This is not to be confused with the similarly named Elm Grove in Ealing which the East India Company took over in 1870 and created the "Royal India Asylum", which closed in 1892.)

Another local asylum was "Lawn House", the home and privately run asylum of Dr John Conolly, which he opened after retiring as superintendent of Hanwell Asylum. After his death in 1866, it was taken over by his son-in-law Henry Maudsley who ran it until 1874.

Down Green Lane and on the west side was the old "Hanwell Cottage Hospital", which was named "The Queen Victoria and War Memorial Hospital". This was built in 1900 and paid for by public subscription and run on voluntary contributions until the creation of the NHS in 1948. In 1979 it was replaced by "Ealing District General Hospital", on the other side of the River Brent. The southern Portland stone and brick pier of the cottage hospital's entrance, bearing the inscription HANWELL was preserved as a permanent reminder of Hanwell's first hospital. The two original Edwardian street lamps outside the entrance were also preserved, but then mysteriously disappeared, causing enquiries to be made.

=== Transport ===
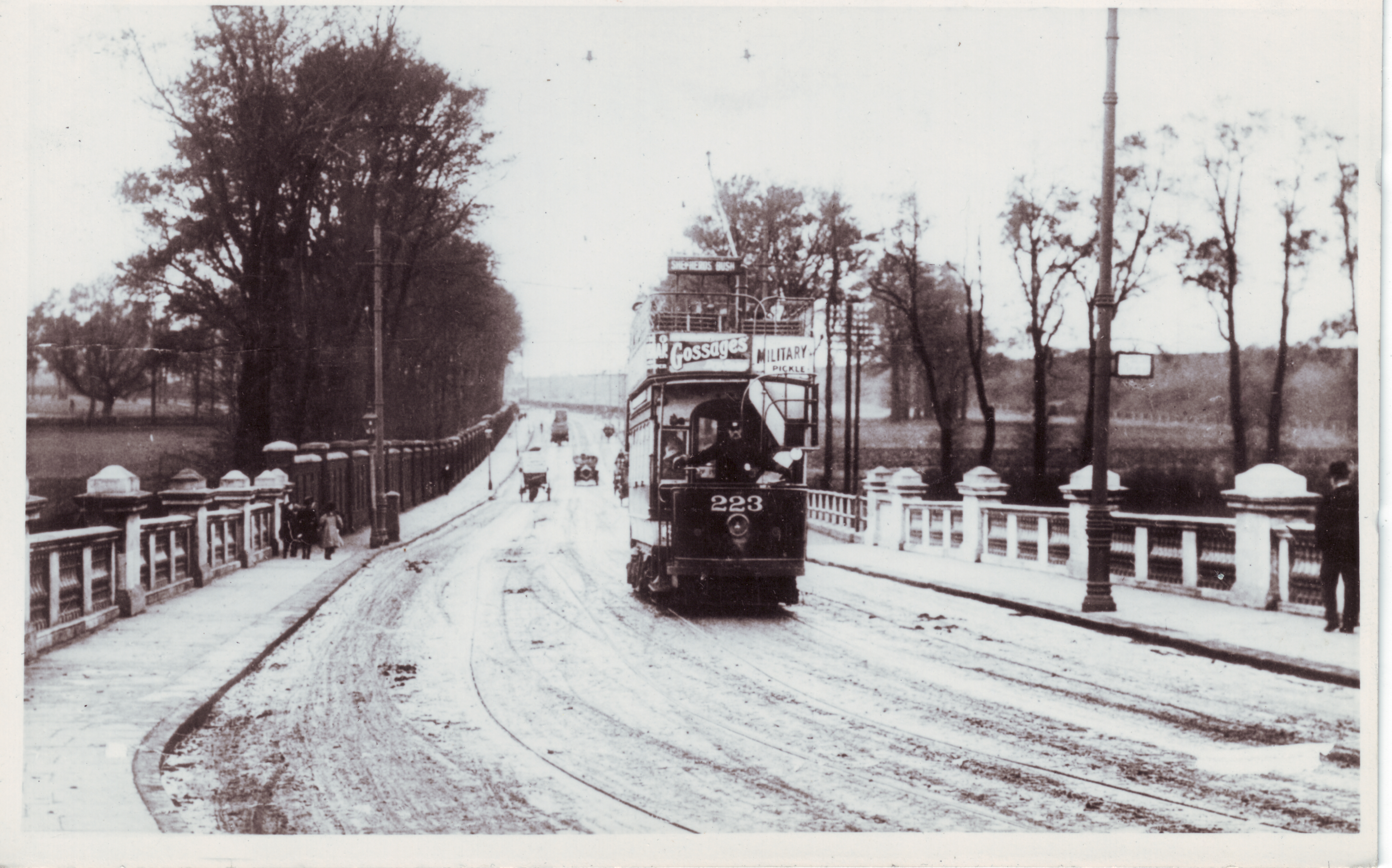
Tram crossing Hanwell Bridge

In 1901 the first electric trams began to run along the Uxbridge Road, causing the population of the village to expand faster than with the arrival of the trains half a century before. First however, the tram company had to strengthen Hanwell Bridge, as well as widen it on its north side. A balustrade, which survives to this day, lines each side. Another stipulation placed upon the company was that the standards to support the catenary also had to be able to double as street lampposts. The cars cost £1,000 each yet the ordinary fare from Shepherd's Bush to Uxbridge was only 8^{d}.

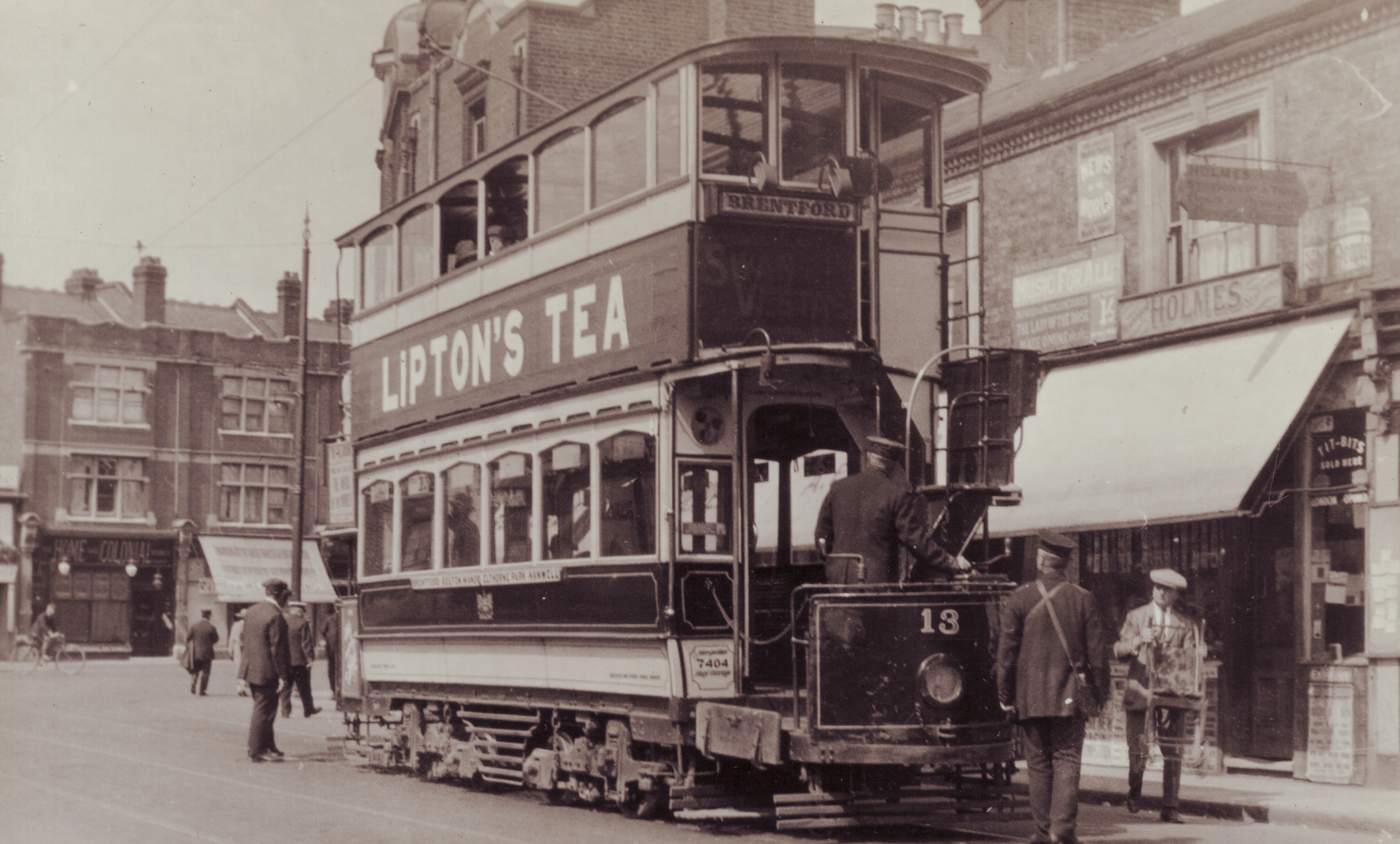
Tram in Boston Road, Uxbridge Road is behind

A route from Brentford to Hanwell was introduced on 26 May 1906.

A tram depot (later converted into a trolleybus depot and then into a bus garage) was located on the Uxbridge Road. It was closed down in 1993 and the land has been converted into a retail park.

AEC Routemaster buses were built at the AEC factory in Windmill Lane and much of the fuel injection equipment and electrical systems were manufactured by CAV Ltd who had a factory in Acton Vale. The large Routemaster tyres were moulded and cured, just to the south on the Great West Road in Brentford by the Firestone Tire and Rubber Company whose factory was opened there in 1928.

Trolley buses were introduced in 1936 and ran until the early 1960s.

Plans to reintroduce trams in the form of the West London Tram scheme were suggested, but then abandoned by Transport for London in 2007 in the face of local opposition.

== Hanwell Estate ==
LCC cottage estates 1918–1939
Estate name	Area	No of dwellings	Population 1938	Population density
Pre-1914
Norbury	11	218	867	19.8 per acre (49/ha)
Old Oak	32	736	3519	23 per acre (57/ha)
Totterdown Fields	39	1262	—	32.4 per acre (80/ha)
Tower Gardens; White Hart Lane	98	783	5936	8 per acre (20/ha)
1919–1923
Becontree	2770	25769 (Note: Source says 2589 – transcription error)	115652	9.3 per acre (23/ha)
Bellingham	252	2673	12004	10.6 per acre (26/ha)
Castelnau	51	644	2851	12.6 per acre (31/ha)
Dover House Estate; Roehampton Estate	147	1212	5383	8.2 per acre (20/ha)
1924–1933
Downham	600	7096	30032	11.8 per acre (29/ha)
Mottingham	202	2337	9009	11.6 per acre (29/ha)
St Helier	825	9068	39877	11 per acre (27/ha)
Watling	386	4034	19110	10.5 per acre (26/ha)
Wormholt	68	783	4078	11.5 per acre (28/ha)
1934–1939
Chingford (Note: Part of a larger PRC estate around Huntsman Road)	217	1540	—	7.1 per acre (18/ha)
Hanwell (Ealing)	140	1587	6732	11.3 per acre (28/ha)
Headstone Lane	142	n.a	5000	
Kenmore Park	58	654	2078	11.3 per acre (28/ha)
Thornhill (Royal Borough of Greenwich)	21	380	1598	18.1 per acre (45/ha)
Whitefoot Lane (Downham)	49	n.a	n.a.	
Source: Yelling, J. A. (1995). "Banishing London's slums: The interwar cottage estates" (PDF). Transactions. 46. London and Middlesex Archeological Society: 167–173. Quotes: Rubinstein, 1991, Just like the country.

The 140 acres (57 ha) Hanwell estate is a London County Council cottage estate built between the wars. It provides 1586 houses and flats.

== Places of interest and recreation ==
=== The parish church ===
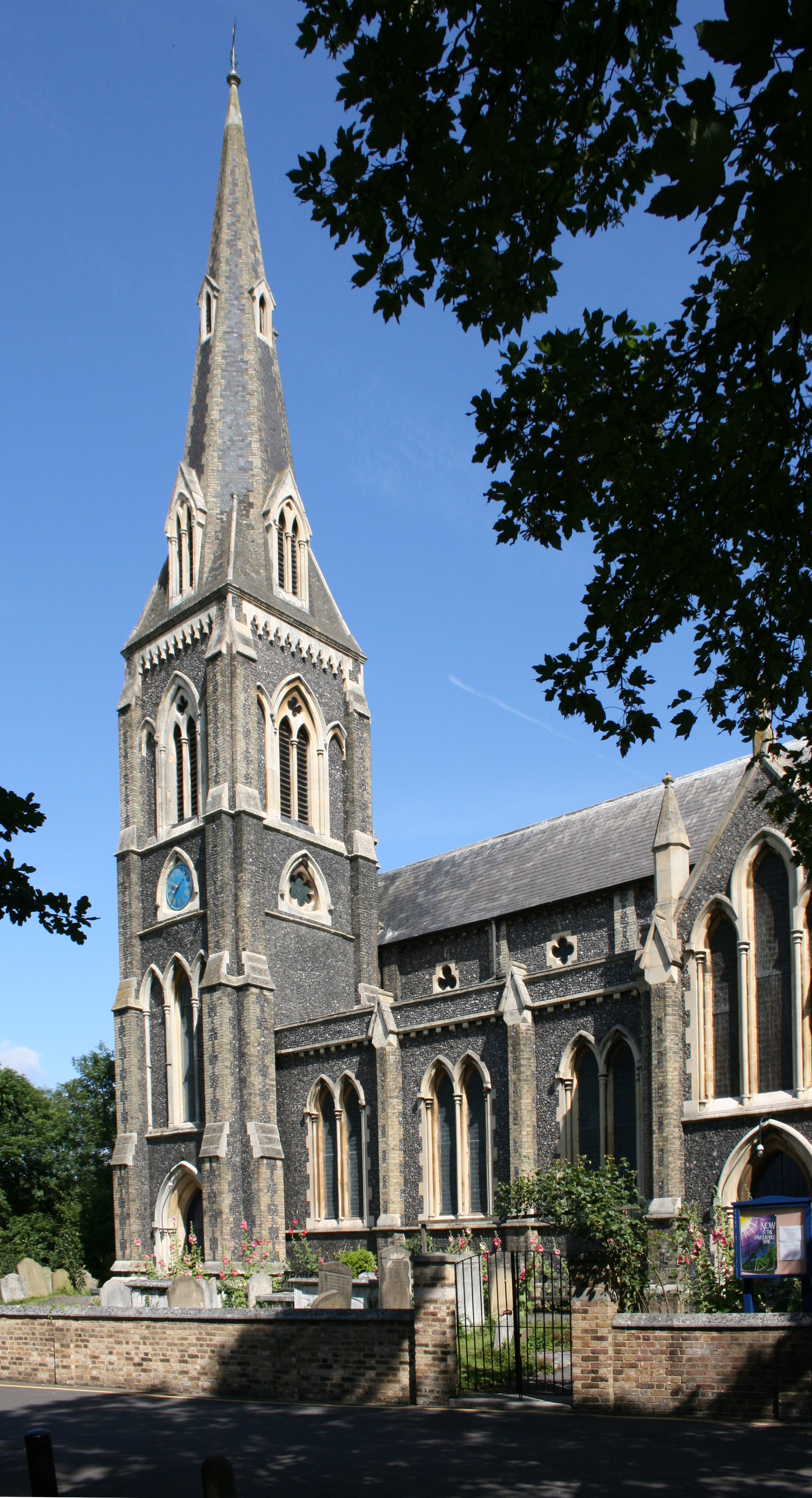
St Mary, Hanwell, built in 1841

St Mary's Church is the original ancient parish church. The present church structure was built in 1841 and consecrated in 1842. As such, it stands as one of George Gilbert Scott's very early churches, executed in the style of Gothic Revival, and consists of masoned white limestone and gault brickwork, with flint-rubble and mortar panels. Scott himself later condemned his work of this period as "a mass of horrors". However, the famous painter William Frederick Yeames, who at one time was its churchwarden, is thought to have done the wall paintings in the chancel.

Perhaps the most famous rector was Dr. George H. Glasse; he has a memorial place in his memory in St. Mary's Churchyard (Grade II). Still surviving is the home he had built for him nearby in 1809. It is executed in the style of cottage orné and named The Hermitage (Grade II). Nikolaus Pevsner described it thus: "a peach of an early c19 Gothic thatched cottage with two pointed windows, a quatrefoil, and an ogee arched door, all on a minute scale. Inside, an octagonal hall and reception room".

In latter years another well-known rector was Fred Secombe (brother of Harry Secombe). After leaving and moving back to Wales, he became a prolific author.

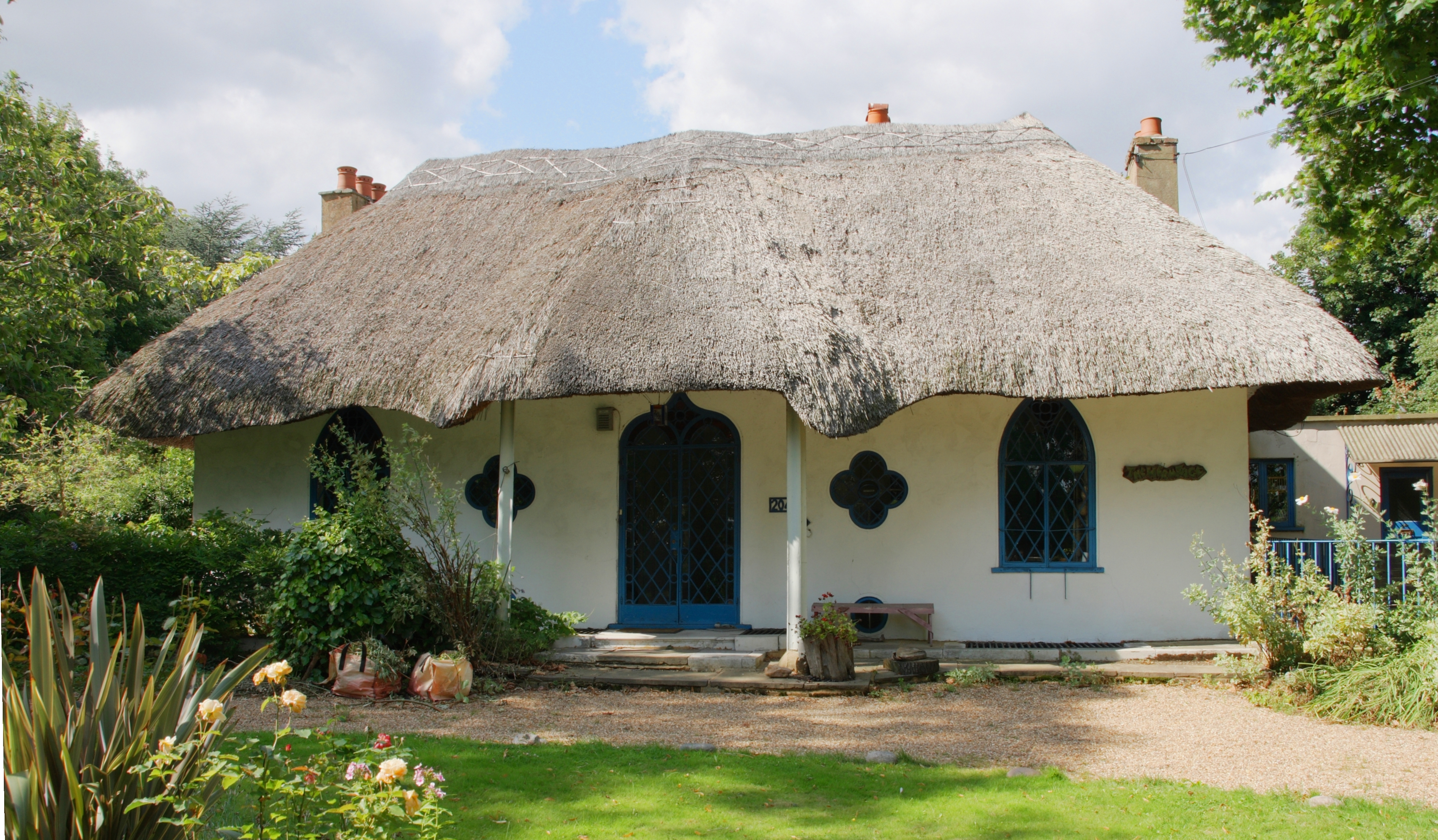
The Hermitage built 1809 (Grade II)

No archaeological evidence has been found so far, to show that any church existed here earlier than shown in written records. However, due to its commanding topographical position, which enables the distinctive broach spire to be seen from many miles away, it has been suggested that this may have been a pagan place of worship long before Christianity reached this part of the world. There is however, no evidence to support this theory. An early supporter of this hypothesis was Sir Montagu Sharpe KC DL, a local historian and a member of the Society of Antiquaries. (In nearby Northolt, the parish church, which is also on high ground, has had much evidence found around it of past occupation by the Beaker People.)

=== St Thomas the Apostle ===
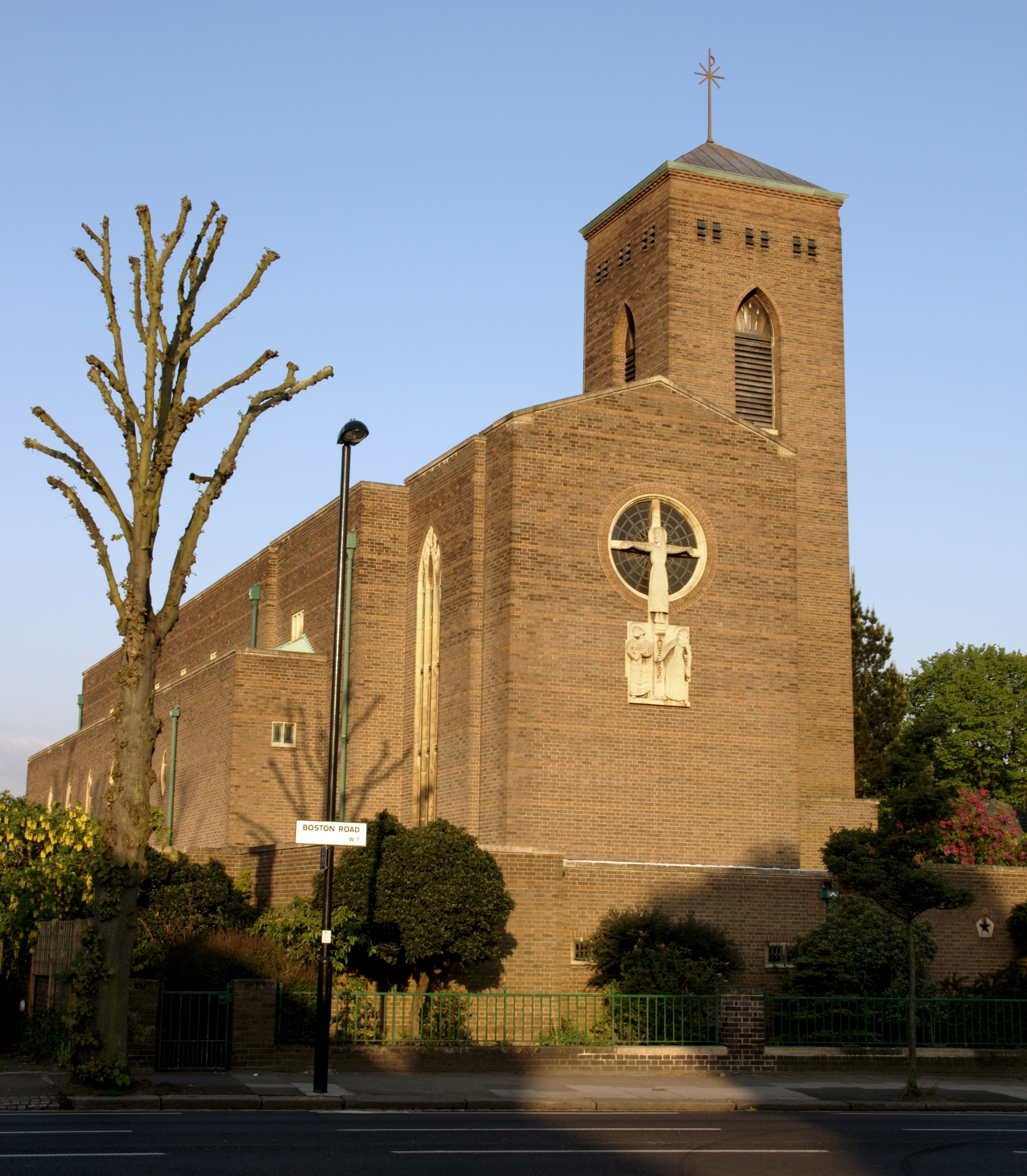
The east face of St. Thomas the Apostle, Boston Road

St Thomas's is a Grade II* listed building. Edward Maufe won the competition for Guildford Cathedral in 1932. His reputation as a church architect had hitherto rested on restoration work at AIl Saints, Southampton and St Martin's in the Fields; and on two churches for the Royal Association for the Deaf at East Acton and Clapham, and – most notable – a well respected 'Clubland' Methodist chapel in Walworth, which was bombed in the war.

Work on Guildford Cathedral did not begin until 1936. In the meantime Maufe designed St Thomas's, for which the foundation stone was laid in July 1933. Completed in 1934, the materials used were an experiment with the form of construction proposed for Guildford. They were the load-bearing silver grey Tondu brick from South Wales and particularly the reinforced concrete vault lined with acoustic plaster. Many of the interior details are also similar to Guildford Cathedral: most notably the tall lancets and narrow aisle passages with the acutely pointed arches, but also the style of some of the fittings and the employment of Eric Gill as one of the sculptors.

==== Exterior ====
The large Calvary that arrests attention from the road is by Eric Gill, its cross forming the tracery of the East Window. This was carved "in situ" from a single Weldon stone block. The carving over the north door is the work of Vernon Hill, depicting a dove with the girdle of Our Lady that was sent to St Thomas. To the left of the door, almost at ground level, the seal of Edward Maufe can be seen.

The wave pattern to the brass kicking plates on the doors represents the sea. Inside the north porch is a carving of St Matthew by John Skelton (nephew of Eric Gill).

The carving over the west door is also by Vernon Hill and represents two birds pecking from the same bunch of grapes symbolic of all Christians sharing the one cup at Communion.

==== Edward Maufe's 'finest church' ====
In her listing report to English Heritage Elain Harwood described St Thomas' as Maufe's 'finest church'. She writes:

'Inside the feeling is of a great church exquisitely miniaturised. Indeed, it has frequently been said that Maufe's distinctive and austere style was better suited to the small scale than to a cathedral. Moreover, St Thomas's substantiates Pevsner's admission that Maufe was "a man with genuine spatial gifts". The initial impression is of a nave and chancel of equal height given semblance of religious presence by narrow passage aisles cut into the thick piers of the vault, Alibi style. The east end is more complicated, however, One becomes aware of a cross axis along the front of the chancel, and another in front of the sanctuary itself On the south side there are vestries and a kitchen: on the north side another door, a Morning Chapel, now called the Lady Chapel, and between them a little Children's Corner or chapel set within the thick walls of the tower. There is a small space behind the sanctuary, reached through the arches.'

==== Font and nave ====
At the west end of the church is the font, which was also carved by Vernon Hill in Weldon stone. It depicts a fish and anchor and the ICQUS cypher, which are all signs for Christ. The stained glass behind the font, depicting 'Christ and the children', is by Moira Forsyth. The War Memorial came from the 'tin church', which used to stand where the Parish Hall now stands.

In the Nave, the light fittings are plated with silver and bear the arms of the twelve apostles. The original foot-long candle bulbs are now unobtainable and have been replaced with a modern energy saving equivalent.

The flooring is linoleum and was originally buff in colour and marked out with blue lines. The sign of St. Thomas the Apostle – a builder's square and three spears – can be seen on the churchwardens' staves and various other places in the church. The square indicates that Thomas was a builder and that spears were the instruments of his martyrdom.

==== Sanctuary ====
The Sanctuary is dominated by the reredos that came from St Thomas's Portman Square. It was made to the design of Cecil Greenwood Hare, Bodley's last partner and successor to his practice. The three manual organ also came from St Thomas', Portman Square and was reconditioned and electrified by Walker and Sons Ltd.

=== St Mellitus Church ===
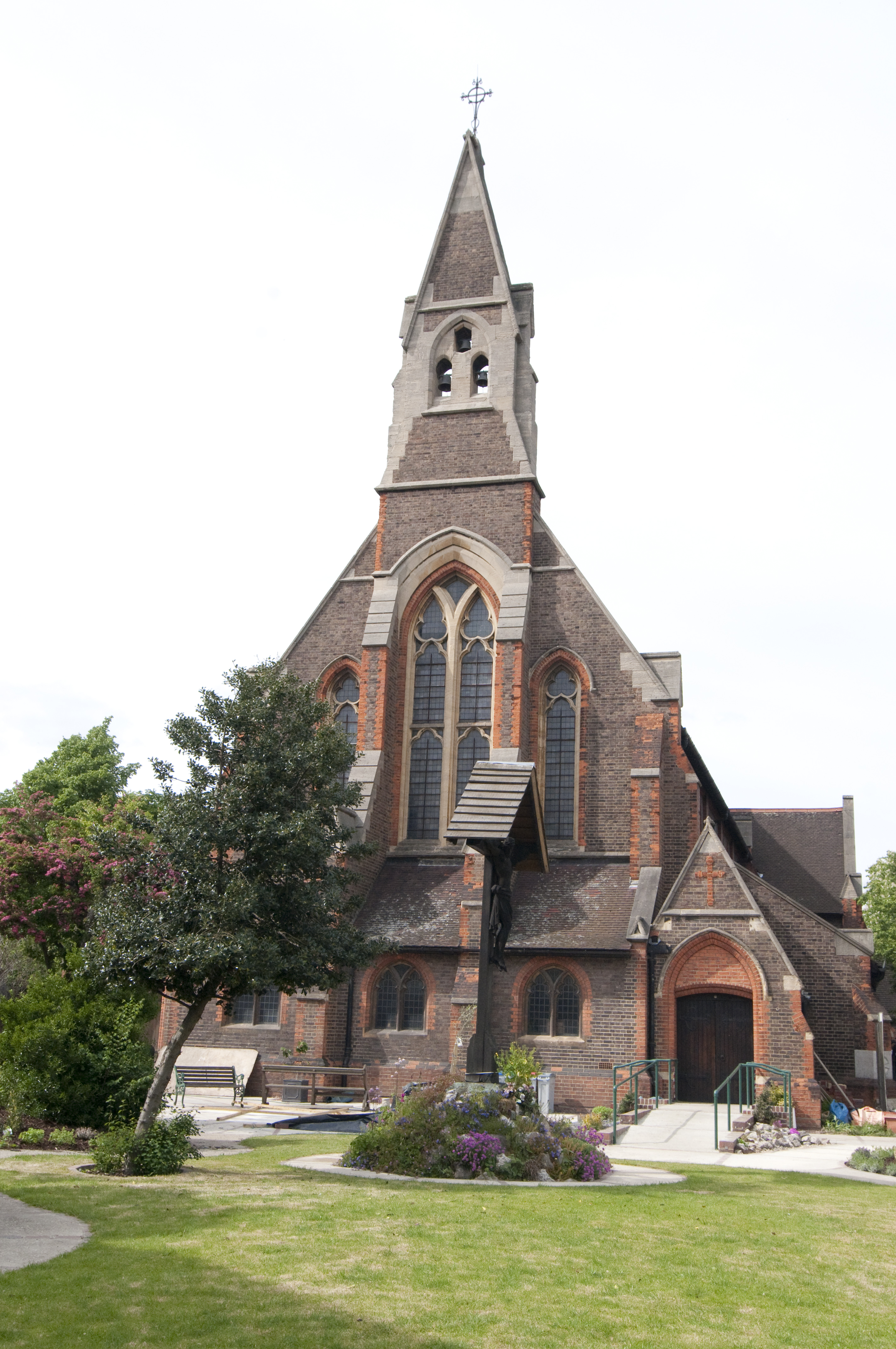
St Mellitus, Hanwell

Until the early years of the 20th century all of Hanwell had been one parish, St Mary's. The inadequacy of one church to serve a growing population is indicated by the rebuilding of St Mary's church in 1842 to cater for the increased number of church goers and then by the building in 1877 of St Mark's as an additional church serving the south of the parish. By the turn of the century this was no longer sufficient and it was decided to create an additional parish, St Mellitus, the first in the Anglican Communion to bear that name.

The church building is an imposing Gothic style building of the Edwardian period situated on a busy cross roads in the heart of Hanwell. It was designed by the office of Sir Arthur Blomfield in 1909, built by Messrs J Dorey & Co of Brentford and consecrated by the Bishop of London, Rt Rev Arthur Winnington-Ingram in March 1910. It is a landmark building with a distinctive gable end housing three recently restored bells.

The parish was formed in 1908 and lay between the railway and Elthorne Park, thus including St Mark's as a chapel of ease. While St Mark's would continue in this fashion as a subsidiary church for the parish, it was clear that a new, bigger parish church was needed and so Sir Arthur Blomfield was commissioned to design it. With a capacity of 800 people it was designated St Mellitus, the name probably derived from the legend, propagated by Sir Montagu Sharpe, the Middlesex historian, that Mellitus, Bishop of the East Saxons, was instrumental in the conversion of the Anglo-Saxons of Hanwell. Funds for the new church were raised from the sale of Holy Trinity in Gough Square in the city of London.

In 1980, with the retirement of the then vicar of St Mark's, the two parishes were merged, now known as St Mellitus with St Mark's.

=== The Wharncliffe Viaduct ===
Brunel's first major structural design and the first contract to be let on his Great Western Railway. The viaduct carries trains across the Brent valley at an elevation of 65 feet (20 m).

Constructed of brick, the 900-foot-long (270 m) bridge has 8 arches, each spanning 70 feet (21 m) and rising 17 feet 6 inches (5.33 m). The supporting piers are hollow and tapered, rising to projecting stone cornices that held up the arch centring during construction.

Originally, the piers were 30 feet (9.1 m) wide at ground level and 33 feet (10 m) at deck level. The deck was designed to accommodate two tracks of Brunel's broad gauge railway.

However, Railway Regulation (Gauge) Act 1846 (9 & 10 Vict. c. 57) was passed that made Stephenson's narrower gauge standard across the country and so the viaduct was widened in 1847 by the addition of an extra row of piers and arches on the north side. The new width is 55 feet (17 m). In 1892 the broad gauge track was converted to standard gauge, and this allowed enough width for four standard gauge tracks. Overhead electrification, at 25,000 volts AC, of the London to Bristol main line is in progress (2017).

The viaduct is still used today for trains running from Paddington to Bristol. Lord Wharncliffe's coat of arms can be seen on the central pier on the south side. He was chairman of the Great Western Railway.

=== Hanwell Flight of Locks ===
Windmill and Lock, painting by J. M. W. Turner

The Hanwell flight of six locks raises the Grand Union Canal by just over 53 feet (16.2 m) and has been designated a scheduled monument by English Heritage. At the top of the flight of locks towards Norwood Green is the Three Bridges designed by Isambard Kingdom Brunel. It is still often referred to on maps by the original canal crossing name of Windmill Bridge and is very close to the spot where the eponymous windmill once stood. It was painted by Brentford artist, J. M. W. Turner. However, there was also a windmill on the grounds where the Hanwell asylum once stood and the original name was Watermill Lane; hence the name appears to originate with the watermill that stood near to the club house of the local golf club house. This canal and flight of locks are actually within the boundary of Southall but are named after the local village of Hanwell, which is much closer than either of the villages of Norwood or Southall.

=== The Central London District Poor School/Hanwell Community Centre ===
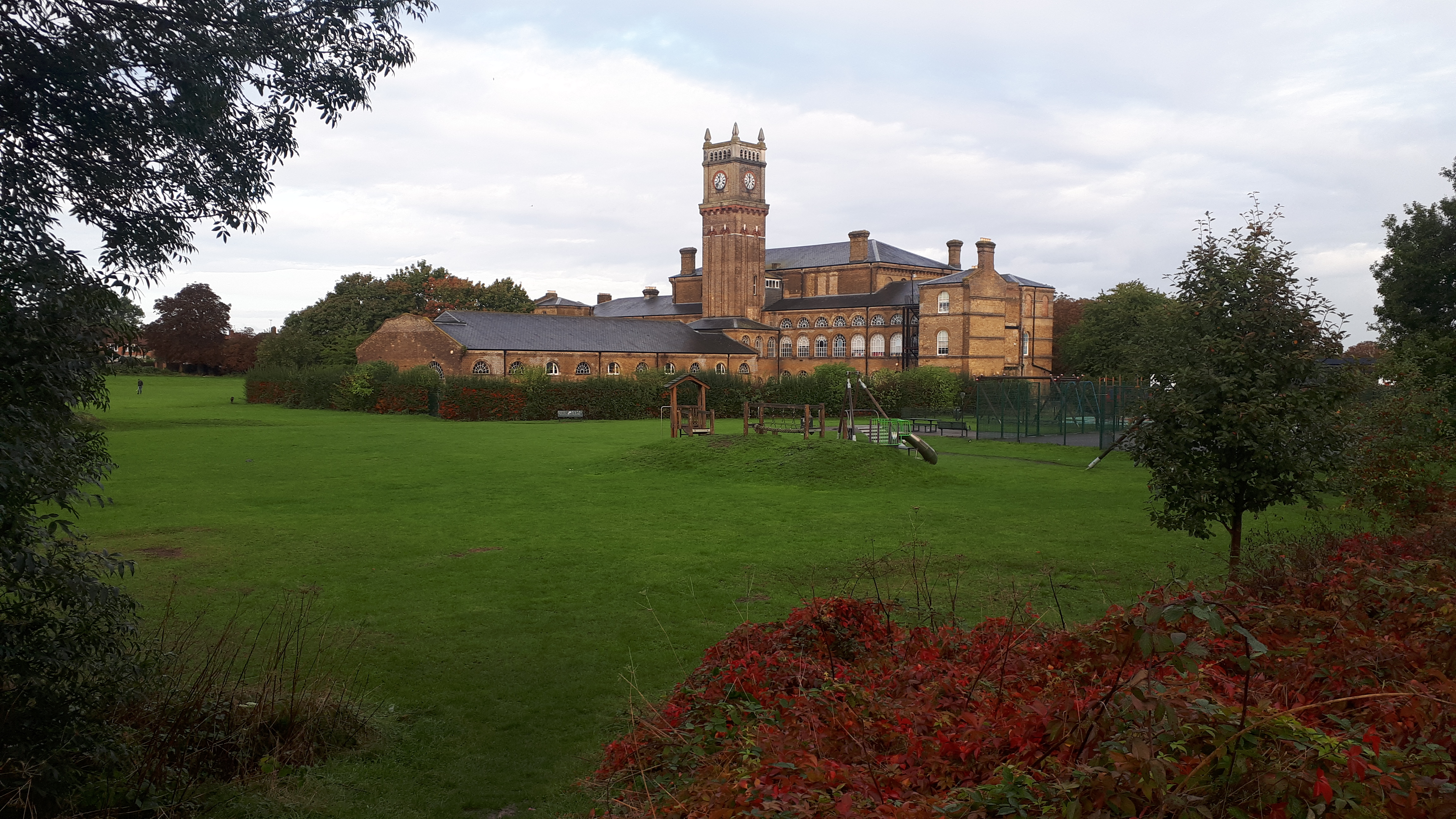
Hanwell Community Centre

The Central London District Poor School, aka the Cuckoo Schools at Hanwell was built between 1856 and 1861 by a group of central London poor law unions to house and educate pauper children away from the workhouse; the original site at Norwood having proved to be too small and unsuitable for extension. By far its most famous resident was Charlie Chaplin who was at the school from June 1896 until January 1898.

The school was closed in 1933 but parts of it remain standing, and it is in use as the Hanwell Community Centre. The Community Centre was used as a location in the film Billy Elliot. It has been declared a Grade II listed building by English Heritage. In 2015 the London Welsh School moved into the building.

=== Brent Lodge Park and Animal Centre ===
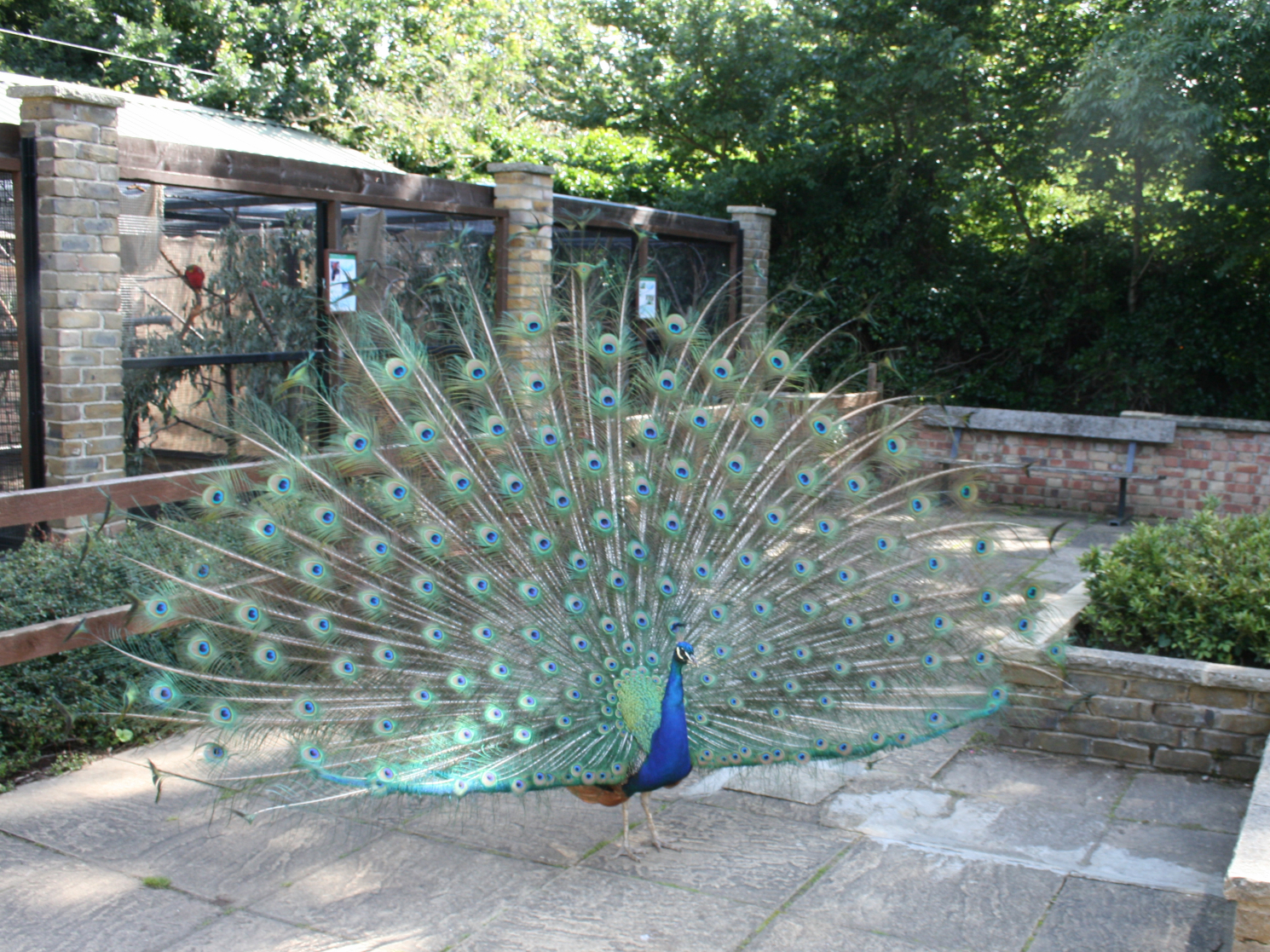
Peacock at the Brent Lodge Park Animal Centre

This park was acquired by Ealing Borough Council as a recreation ground in 1931 from Sir Montagu Sharpe (1856–1942), who had lived in Brent Lodge since 1884. The lodge itself, by then dilapidated, was demolished. The original stable block remains and is Grade II listed. For many years the park served as a 9-hole golf course requiring no more than a small driver and a putt, which could be hired together with a ball from a kiosk. Small boys would supplement their pocket money by retrieving lost balls from the river.

Another attraction was a large wired enclosure, within which unwanted pet rabbits (and tortoises, guinea pigs etc.) were given a new home. This inevitably led to it acquiring the nickname 'Bunny Park', which is still how most locals refer to it today. Later, the animal collection became more exotic as it began to receive and house imported animals that remained unclaimed after their period of compulsory quarantine had expired. Better enclosures were built and it has now become a small zoo and is a recognized member of the British and Irish Association of Zoos and Aquariums (BIAZA). As of April 2016, the animal centre has been renamed Hanwell Zoo, and is home to such animals as Mara, Capybara, Meerkats, Caribbean Flamingo and Crested Porcupine, Emperor Tamarin monkeys and Ring-tailed Lemurs.

The park has a modern and well-equipped children's playground. Clearly visible on Google Earth are the 2,000 yew trees that were planted to create the Millennium Maze. The entrance to the park is at the south-west side of St Mary's Church at the end of Church Road.

The park also has a coffee shop and a children's play area.

=== Brent River Park and Brent Valley Golf Club ===
The Lodge Park is part of the larger Brent River Park, which follows the river from Perivale down to Hanwell. In this river valley, there is also the Brent Valley Golf Club

=== Hanwell Clock Tower ===
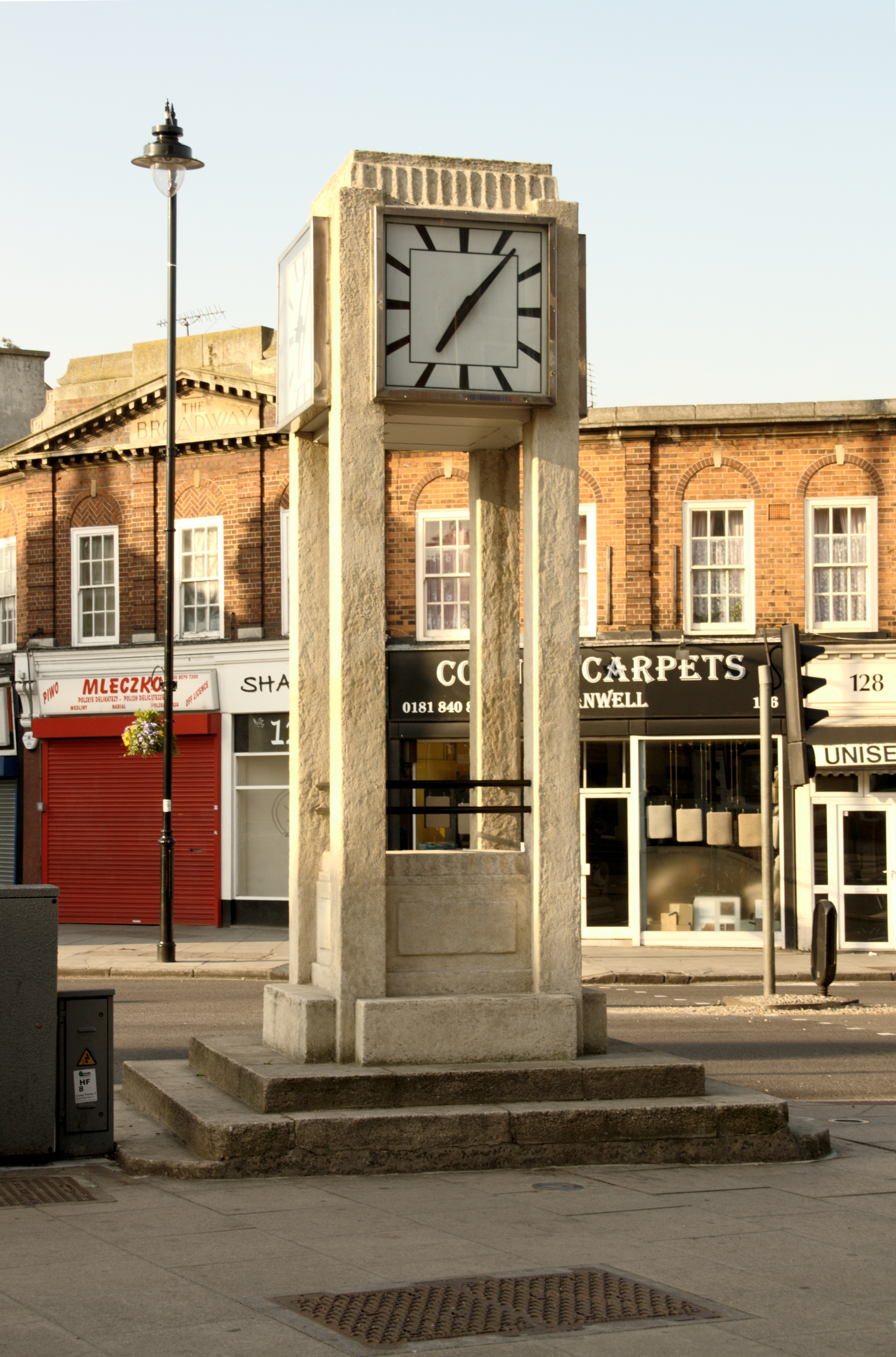
Hanwell's Coronation (1937) clock tower

This was unveiled on Hanwell Broadway at midday on 7 May 1937, as part of Ealing's celebration of the coronation of King George VI and Queen Elizabeth (later known as the Queen Mother) by Alderman Alfred Bradford, chairman of the Highways Committee. The Mayor, Frederick Woodward, was also present, as were members of the Hanwell Chamber of Commerce and 'a large concourse of the general public'.

Amongst other remarks, the Mayor said: "I consider Hanwell one of the finest gateways to the city of London, and I cannot think of a more fitting place for the clock". It had been Timothy King, a councillor from Hanwell, who had first suggested the idea and had fought for it in the Highways Committee. Alderman Bradford was proud that the Hanwell Clock had been the result of a Hanwell man's work. It was also noted that the Mayor was born in Hanwell (he also attended Hanwell National School and was married there).

However, the clock tower became the centre of controversy in the early 70s. This started because a Hanwell estate agent, one Mr Parish, objected to it and wanted to raise £5,000 to demolish it and replace it with something more pleasing. According to him, the clock tower was a "dreadful concrete eyesore" and "aesthetically pleasing neither in its location nor design". He added that it was "downright ugly…built in the thirties, one of the worst periods for design". He also commented "the motive behind it was largely self-congratulatory on the part of a small village community". The latter statement was certainly open to question, since Mr Parish seemed to have had no evidence to back it up, and nor was Hanwell "a small village community" in 1937 with a population of over 20,000.

This caused much annoyance to both residents of Hanwell and commuters who passed the tower on their way to work. Parish's views were seen as 'arrogant' and 'insulting'. Some thought it was a useful reminder of the time (Mr Parish later doubted the clock's accuracy) or a good meeting place. Others defended it as being in the style of the time "if the clock tower is typical of the thirties, that is how it should be". The Elthorne Ward Labour Group also defended the tower, some members feeling that its removal might herald the construction of an office block.

On the whole, Parish's arguments were countered. The general thrust was that the clock tower needed restoration, not demolition. In the following year, such work was carried out and the tower properly cleaned up. Its appearance even had the effect of converting Mr Parish, who commented "I admit having said some harsh things about its architectural inadequacies", but he liked the new, clean, clock tower, "Come back, all is forgiven".

The problem of cleaning and restoration was a common one over future years. Sometimes the edifice had to be boarded up. However, in 2002, as part of the celebrations of the Queen's Golden Jubilee, the clock tower was again restored. The clock put in operation again and a new plaque displayed to celebrate this renovation.

=== Elthorne Park ===
The name Elthorne goes back at least one thousand years. It was mentioned in the Domesday survey as being one of the six Hundreds of the shire of Middlesex along with Edmonton, Gore, Hounslow, Ossulstone and Spelthorne.

The origin of the park goes back to the 1500s. The original much larger estate, called La Bromeland, was named after the wild yellow flowering Broom shrub, which still grows on the steep embankment of the river Brent.

In the 16th century Thomas Gresham's widow bought the freehold of 'Broomland', which later passed down through Osterley to the Earls of Jersey.

Fifteen years after the Inclosure (Consolidation) Act 1801 the estate was reduced to 90 acres and then became known as Park Farm. At one time, with Cuckoo Farm it was one of the last two existing farms in Hanwell.

In 1908 Lord Jersey started negotiations with the council and Middlesex County Council about the use of the land. Whilst negotiations were going on he allowed a section of the land to be used as a temporary recreation ground.

The farmland was finally broken up c. 1910 and some of the land is now open space and playing fields but seven and a half acres of the site were used to form Elthorne Park.

Lord Villiers and his mother, the Countess of Jersey, officially opened the Park at 3 pm on 11 June 1910. The opening, which had been postponed because of the death of King Edward VII on 6 May 1910, was said to be a grand affair, held in a large marquee with tea being served in the nearby mission church of St Thomas's.

In July 1910 the first event to be held in the park was a show by the Hanwell and Greenford Horticultural Society, which later became an annual event. The following year in April a two-day celebration of George V's coronation took place, which included music from the local Hanwell Band and a march by children from St Ann's school to Elthorne Park.

Although toilets for men were installed in the park from the outset, a toilet for women was not installed until 1912.

The Hanwell 'Sarsen' Stone can be seen just inside the main entrance to the park. This stone, a glacial erratic which was deposited in the Ice Age, was excavated from a gravel pit on a site now occupied by Townholm Crescent.

=== Cemeteries ===
There are three burial grounds in Hanwell. The one at the parish church of St Mary is full. The remaining two are for the deceased residents of other boroughs.

For the local people today, the London Borough of Ealing offers interments in Hortus Cemetery, Southall, and Greenford Park Cemetery, Greenford.

==== St. Mary's church graveyard ====
The graveyard of St. Mary's is the oldest burial ground. To the east side of the church yard is a large square stone monument to the Glasses family, which English Heritage has given a Grade II listing, although it is in a poor state of repair.

==== Westminster City Council Cemetery, Hanwell ====
Built on the former common land of South Field, Westminster City Cemetery, Hanwell is an extramural cemetery run by Westminster City Council.

In 1987 Shirley Porter's controlled Westminster City Council controversially sold to land developers for 15p. It possesses some fine mausoleums and family vaults.

==== Royal Borough of Kensington and Chelsea Cemetery, Hanwell ====
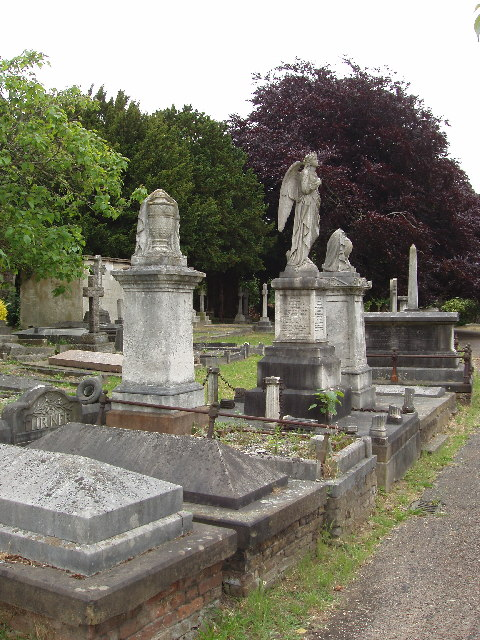
Royal Borough of Kensington and Chelsea Cemetery

Royal Borough of Kensington and Chelsea Cemetery, Hanwell is an extramural Victorian cemetery run by Royal Borough of Kensington and Chelsea. It is situated on the north side of the Uxbridge Road on the former common land of East Field. On the grounds stands a disused chapel. The chapel, gatehouse and entrance arch were designed by Thomas Allom and executed in Kentish ragstone. There are many Victorian and Edwardian graves here.

==== Ancient Saxon burials ====
Middlesex as a whole has a dearth of early Saxon archaeology. However, the nearby place names of Ealing, Yeading and Harrow are of the early Saxon period, even though there are no surviving records of their presence in the Brent valley and its tributaries at this time.

In 1886, during excavation of gravel on Hanwell Common, seven Saxon graves were discovered. They were found approximately where Oaklands Primary School stands today. Of these burials, it is thought that at least three were men with iron spears. Gold-plated copper alloy brooches were also found and may be seen in the Museum of London. They have been dated to between the fifth and the mid sixth century and attest to the age of this Saxon settlement in Hanwell.

However, when they were first uncovered, it led some historians to suppose that these were warriors slain in battle. Especially since some 50 iron spears were found close by. In Victorian times they only had the written records to go on, and, as no mention of Saxon occupation in Middlesex appear for this period, it was a reasonable hypothesis to consider, even though there was no evidence for this fanciful idea that any had died in battle. Archaeological evidence has since shown that Saxons were already present in small numbers along the River Thames generations earlier. Yet the colourful tale of the Battle of Bloody Croft (given as circa AD 572) circulates locally to this day.

Bloody Croft alludes to a small former common field called Blood Croft. This used to lie between the present-day golf links to the west, Greenford Avenue to the east, and is partly covered by the northern half of the present-day Grove Avenue, which itself is 1.5 km to the nor-nor west of the burial site. Since ancient times, pigs were let loose into the woods that once stood upon Cuckoo Hill, to feed upon the acorns and roots therein. This practice was even recorded in the Domesday Book entry for Hanwell. Therefore, the name may just allude to the place, where they were then slaughtered during the Saxon lunar blood month, which falls around November. Blotmonað: blot blood or a sacrifice, monað month. The English Place-Name Society found in its search of the Hanwell records an earlier name for the field, which was Blood Cut Meadow. Their only comment is "possibly 'land on which veterinary phlebotomy was practised.'"

== Schools ==
Schools in Hanwell include:

- Brentside High School,
- Drayton Manor High School (which later adopted as its own the motto the Hanwell Council's motto of nec aspera terrent ("Hardships do not deter us")),
- Elthorne Park High School,
- Hobbayne Primary School,
- Brentside Primary Academy,
- London Welsh School,
- Mayfield Primary School,
- Ealing Fields High School,
- Oaklands Primary School,
- Oaklands Junior School,
- St Josephs RC Primary School,
- St Mark's Primary School.,
- Lycée Français Malraux School (part of the Lycée Français Charles de Gaulle independent French co-education schools)

== Hanwell Hootie ==
In 2013 a plaque was unveiled near the Hanwell Clock Tower to honour Jim Marshall, the founder of Marshall Amplification, who opened his first store in Hanwell in 1962. To commemorate the unveiling the nearby pubs hosted a live music festival with local bands and musicians dubbed the Hanwell Hootie. The event was so successful that it was repeated the following year with more pubs taking part, and in 2015 every pub in Hanwell was included, with even some coffee shops and delicatessens joining in. The festival has now become an annual event, with the 2019 edition taking place on 11 May.

== Sport, leisure and media ==
Hanwell is represented by Non-League football club Hanwell Town F.C., which plays at the Reynolds Field, in Perivale. Nicknamed 'The Geordies' the club was formed in 1920 by a group of natives of Newcastle upon Tyne who were working in the Hanwell area, who adopted the famous black and white stripes of Newcastle United as their colours. They play in the Isthmian League South Central Division. There is also an amateur rugby team, Hanwell RFC (Middlesex Merit Table Division 2), who play at Gunnersbury Park.

A community radio station, Westside 89.6FM serves the local area from studios based at Clocktower Mews.

== In popular culture ==
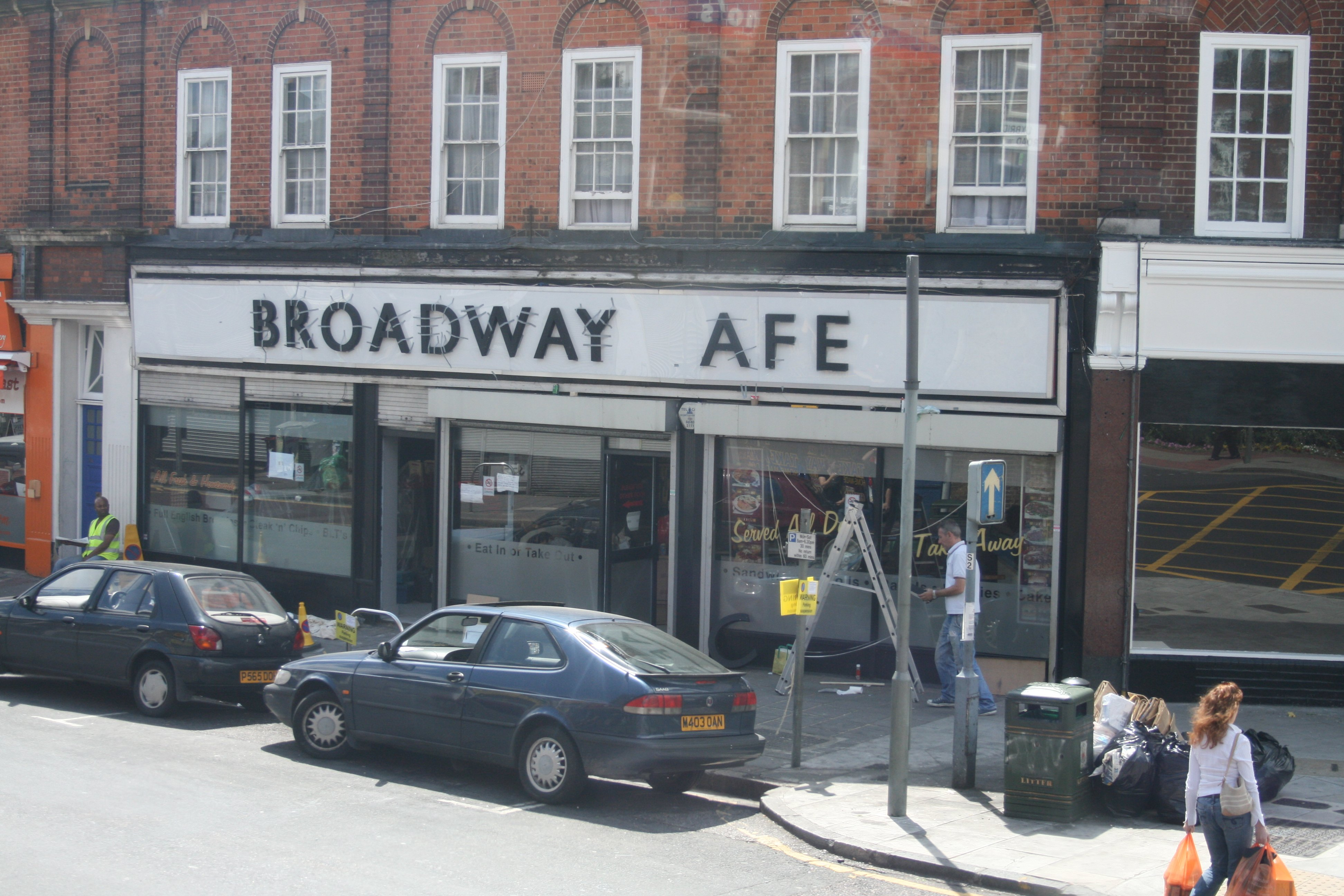
"The Broadway Cafe" in Broken Lines

Hanwell has been the filming location for a number of films and television programmes:

- Broken Lines (2008): From 7–14 July 2007 the Hanwell's First Choice Cafe on the corner of Hanwell Broadway was converted into the Broadway Café for this film, starring Paul Bettany and Olivia Williams.
- Bridget Jones's Diary (2001): Used City of Westminster Cemetery, Hanwell as one of its many London locations.
- Staggered (1994): Starred Martin Clunes as a man late for his own wedding. St Mary's was used for most of the church shots.
- Shine on Harvey Moon (1993) for ITV television: This was a period drama series set in the 1940s. The funeral sequences were also filmed at St Mary's.
- Peep Show: The Dolphin pub (series three, episode four, now The Green W7) and the exterior and interior of St Mary's church for Sophie and Mark's wedding (series four, episode six).
- Billy Elliot (2000): the top floor of the Hanwell Community Centre was used for filming the interior shots of the Everington Boys' Club, where Billy attends boxing and dance practices.
- Extras: The Dolphin pub (now The Green W7). Internal shots twice during an episode starring David Bowie.
- Brush Strokes: This 1980's TV series filmed in St Margarets Road and surrounding streets.
- Carry On Constable (1960): Used many locations around Ealing, with Hanwell Library serving for the exterior shots of their police station. St. Mary's was also used for exterior shots. Scenes were also filmed in York Road close to St Joseph's Primary school resulting in a cast visit to deter curious pupils from interrupting the filming schedule. A disused factory some 200 metres North of the school was the location of the crooks' hideout.
- Carry On Teacher (1959): The Maudlin Street School exterior scenes were shot at Drayton School, Drayton Grove, West Ealing.
- Birth of the Beatles (1979) The upstairs reception room in the Park Hotel in Greenford Avenue (now demolished) was used as the scene for The Beatles audition where they met Rory Storm and Ringo Starr. The disused Variety Theatre adjoining the pub was adapted to depict the Kaiserkeller in Hamburg. German graffiti added for the film remained until the pub was demolished in the mid-1980s.

=== In literature ===
"Hanwell" is often used instead of "Hanwell Asylum". Otherwise Hanwell may be referred to as a point of reference in the space.

So, setting about it as methodically as men might smoke out a wasps' nest, the Martians spread this strange stifling vapour over the Londonward country. The horns of the crescent slowly moved apart, until at last they formed a line from Hanwell to Coombe and Malden.

— from The War of the Worlds by H. G. Wells (1898)

And I remember that as I lifted my head to listen, my eye caught an omnibus on which was written "Hanwell" ... Believing utterly in one's self is a hysterical and superstitious belief like believing in Joanna Southcote: the man who has it has 'Hanwell' written on his face as plain as it is written on that omnibus ... But though moderns deny the existence of sin, I do not think that they have yet denied the existence of a lunatic asylum. We all agree still that there is a collapse of the intellect as unmistakable as a falling house. Men deny hell, but not, as yet, Hanwell.

— from Orthodoxy by G. K. Chesterton (1908).

THE FLOWER GIRL [still preoccupied with her wounded feelings] He's no right to take away my character. My character is the same to me as any lady's.

THE NOTE TAKER. I don't know whether you've noticed it; but the rain stopped about two minutes ago.
THE BYSTANDER. So it has. Why didn't you say so before? and us losing our time listening to your silliness. [He walks off towards the Strand].
THE SARCASTIC BYSTANDER. I can tell where you come from. You come from Anwell. Go back there.
THE NOTE TAKER [helpfully] Hanwell.

THE SARCASTIC BYSTANDER [affecting great distinction of speech] Thenk you, teacher. Haw haw! So long [he touches his hat with mock respect and strolls off].

— from Pygmalion by George Bernard Shaw, 1912

A traveller describes his passage through the Lands of Dream:

I hurried down ... to the edge of the wood. Black though the darkness was in that ancient wood, the beasts that moved in it were blacker still. It is very seldom that any dreamer travelling in Lands of Dream is ever seized by these beasts, and yet I ran; for if a man's spirit is seized in the Lands of Dream his body may survive it for many years and well know the beasts that mouthed him far away and the look in their little eyes and the smell of their breath; that is why the recreation field at Hanwell is so dreadfully trodden into restless paths.

— from "A Shop in Go-By Street" in the short story collection Tales of Three Hemispheres, by Lord Dunsany

Hanwell is depicted in the opening story of An Unreliable Guide to London, published in 2016 by Influx Press:

All these goings-on in Hanwell buzz around the Clock Tower. Walk past it and you'll hear the town giving up its secrets in a tumble that sounds like a rush of water. Careful, you know you can catch rumour like a cold.

— from "Beating the Bounds" by Aki Schilz

=== In video games ===
"Welcome to Hanwell" is a 2017 survival horror game.

== Political representation ==
Hanwell is divided between two parliamentary constituencies: Ealing North (which covers Hanwell north of the railway line to Paddington), represented since 2019 by James Murray of the Labour Party and Ealing Southall (south of the railway line), represented since 2024 by Deirdre Costigan of the Labour Party.

Hanwell consists of two electoral wards for local council elections: North Hanwell and Hanwell Broadway, which both elect councillors to Ealing Council.

Hanwell is in the London Assembly constituency of Ealing and Hillingdon, represented since 2024 by Bassam Mahfouz of the Labour Party. Hanwell was formerly part of the London region for European Parliament elections. The London region elected eight MEPs to the European Parliament.

== Transport ==
=== Nearest railway stations ===
- Hanwell railway station, built c. 1875–77, has been declared a Grade II listed building by English Heritage. This station is approximately 300 metres north of the main Hanwell shops on the Uxbridge Road. It is currently served by four Elizabeth line trains per hour serving all stations to Heathrow to the west and Abbey Wood via central London to the East. Hanwell railway station has undergone a refurbishment of its Grade II listed building, including newly installed lifts for step-free access from platform to station.
- Castle Bar Park and Drayton Green railway stations also serve the town with twice-hourly trains from Monday-Saturday.
- Greenford railway station First Great Western trains to Paddington known by elderly locals as the Push Pull because when steam trains were used on this line they did not turn around for the return journey but went backwards PUSH.

=== Nearest Underground stations ===
- Boston Manor (Piccadilly line).
- Ealing Broadway (Central line, District line).
- Northfields (Piccadilly line)
- Perivale (Central line)

=== Nearest bus services ===
Hanwell is served by bus routes 195, 207, 483, E1, E3, E8 and E11 and night bus routes N83 and N207. In addition the limited stop express service from Uxbridge to Shepherd's Bush SL8 also stops in Hanwell.

== Hanwell residents past and present ==
Jonas with his brolly

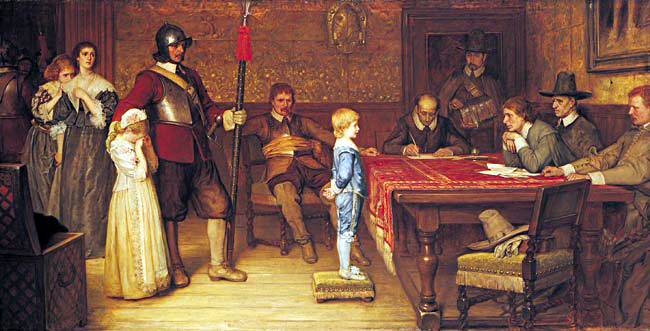
And When Did You Last See Your Father? by William Frederick Yeames

- Thomas Baillie (1796-1863), commissioner of Crown lands and Surveyor General of New Brunswick. Named the settlement of Hanwell, New Brunswick, Canada after his hometown in England.
- Steve Benbow (1931–2006), folk guitar player, singer and music director
- Edward Augustus Bond (1815–1898), born in Hanwell; librarian and palaeographer; co-founded the Palaeographical Society
- Al Bowlly, singer; buried with other WW2 bombing victims in a mass grave in the City of Westminster Cemetery, Uxbridge Road, Hanwell
- The Brand New Heavies, acid jazz band, members attended Drayton Manor High School
- Charlie Chaplin, actor; was boarded at and attended the Central London District School (Cuckoo Schools), Hanwell, June 1896 – January 1898
- Derwent Coleridge, distinguished scholar, author; rector at Hanwell
- John Conolly, superintendent at the Hanwell Asylum, 1839–1844; ran a private asylum at Lawn House, Hanwell
- Henry Corby, businessman and politician; born in 1806 at Hanwell; died 25 October 1881 at Belleville, Ontario, Canada
- Peter Crouch, footballer; attended Drayton Manor High School
- Deep Purple, rock band, rehearsed for their 1970 album Deep Purple in Rock in the Hanwell Community Centre; promotional photographs for the album were taken in the grounds
- Declan Donnellan, theatre director and founder of Cheek by Jowl; lived in Cowper Road
- Ella Eyre (McMahon), singer of "Waiting all Night" by Rudimental
- Freddie Frinton, comedian; buried in Westminster Cemetery.
- Jack Good, pioneering music TV producer with links to artists including the Beatles and the Monkees, was born in Greenford.
- Jonas Hanway, writer, philanthropist and the first man to carry an umbrella in London; buried in the crypt of St Mary's Church
- Jimi Hendrix, owned a house in Hanwell, but never lived in it
- Philip Jackson, actor
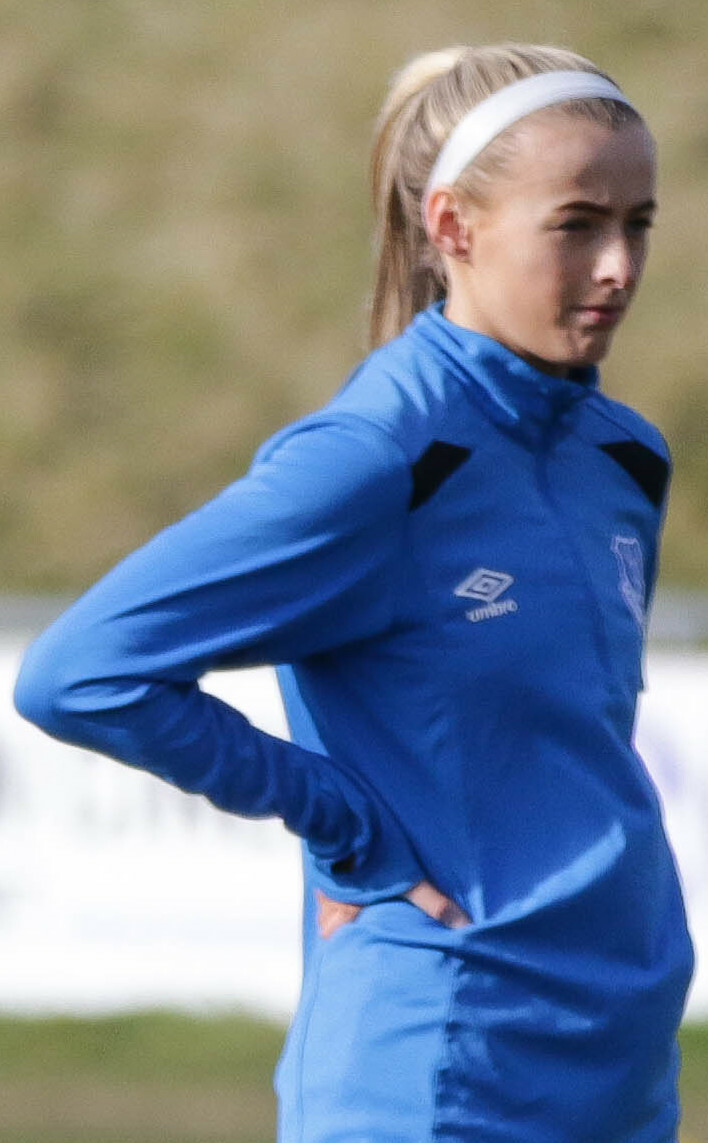
- Chloe Kelly
  Anna Brownell Jameson, writer and feminist
- Chloe Kelly, footballer; attended Elthorne Park High School
- The Magic Numbers, indie-pop band
- Jim Marshall (1923–2012), had a small shop in Hanwell where he started manufacturing and selling his world-famous amplifiers; in an interview for Musicians Hotline, said "So many players came to my Hanwell shop, it was almost like a rock and roll labour exchange because a lot of groups were formed there."
- Henry Maudsley (1835–1918), pioneering English psychiatrist; ran John Conolly's private asylum at Lawn House, Hanwell, 1866–1874
- Sir Steve McQueen, artist and film director; attended Drayton Manor High School
- Philip "Swill" Odgers, vocalist and acoustic guitarist with British folk punk group The Men They Couldn't Hang (TMTCH); long time Hanwell resident
- Fred Secombe (1918–2016), one-time vicar of St. Mary's Church, Hanwell; born in Swansea; elder brother of the late Sir Harry Secombe; since retiring, has written seven books, in a style that has had him referred to as 'the ecclesiastical James Herriott'
- Sir Montagu Sharpe, lived at Brent Lodge; historian and one time president of the London and Middlesex Archaeological Society; on local history he wrote the books Bygone Hanwell; The Great Ford of the lower Thames; Middlesex in Roman and Saxon Times and Middlesex in the Domesday Book
- Daniel Hack Tuke: distinguished mental doctor; related to the line of Tukes who founded the York Retreat
- Henry Scott Tuke, RA, son of Daniel Tuke; painter; both lived at Golden Manor
- Rick Wakeman, keyboardist for the band Yes; never lived in Hanwell, but attended Drayton Manor Grammar School on Drayton Bridge Road, leaving in 1966
- Brian Whelan, painter, author and filmmaker; lived in two locations in Hanwell while growing up
- William Frederick Yeames RA, artist known for having painted And When Did You Last See Your Father?; lived at 8 Campbell Road, where there is a blue plaque to commemorate the fact; one-time churchwarden of St Mary's church
More views of Hanwell and its environs
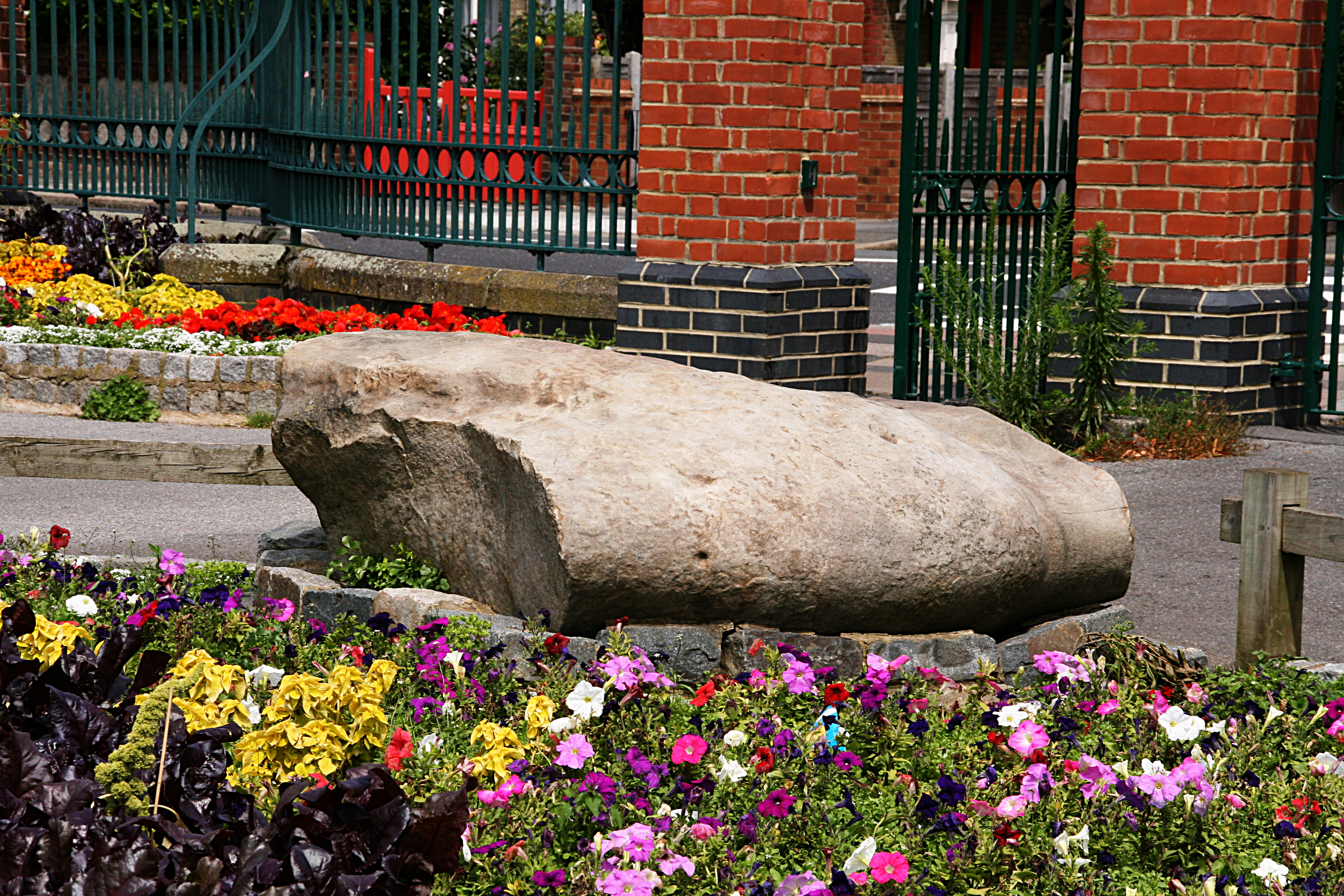
The glacial erratic in Elthorne Park

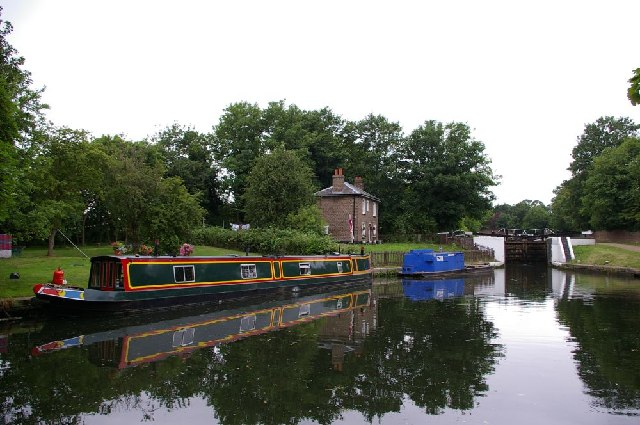
Hanwell Flight – The Southerly Lock Keeper's Cottage

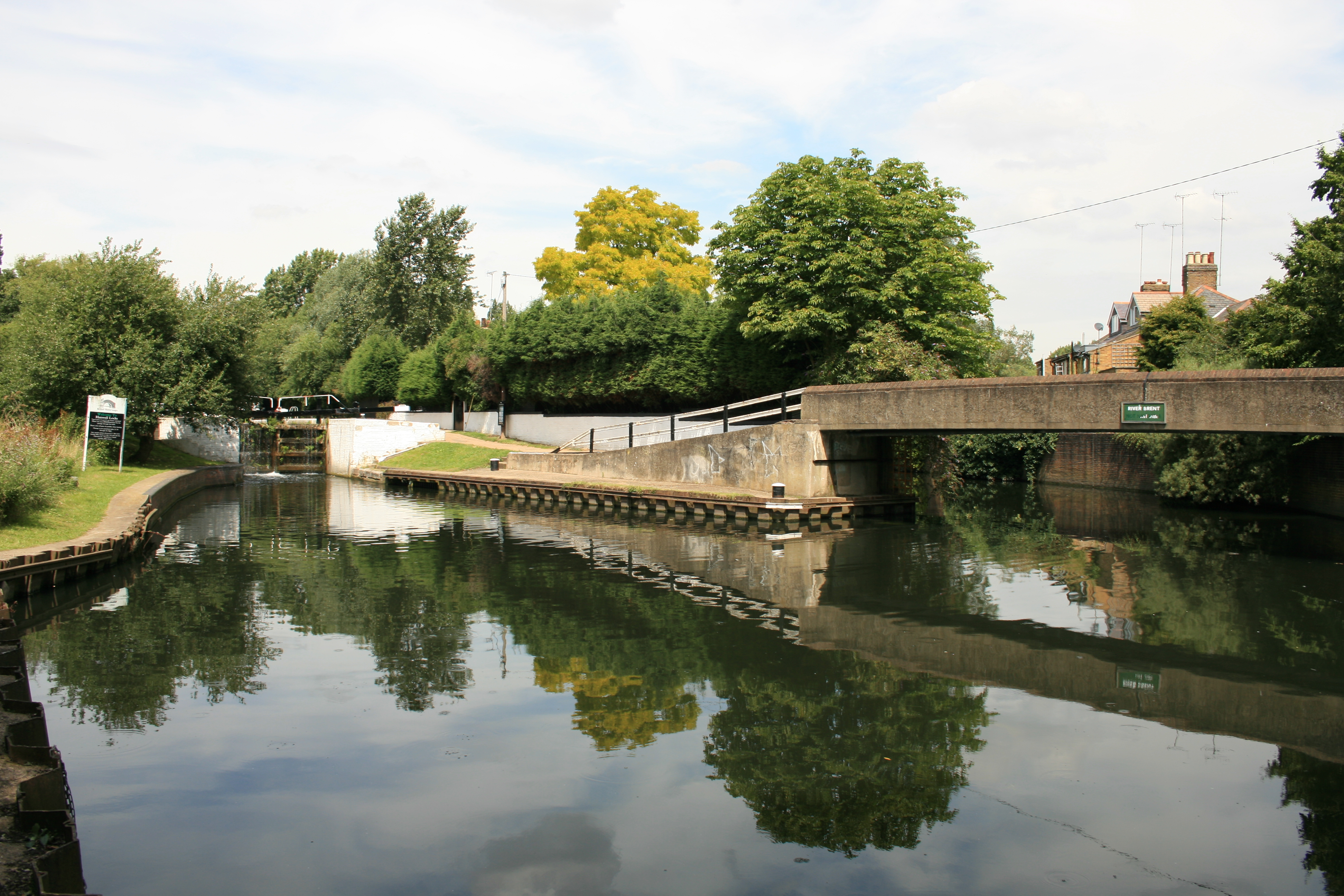
Confluence of the Grand Union Canal and River Brent

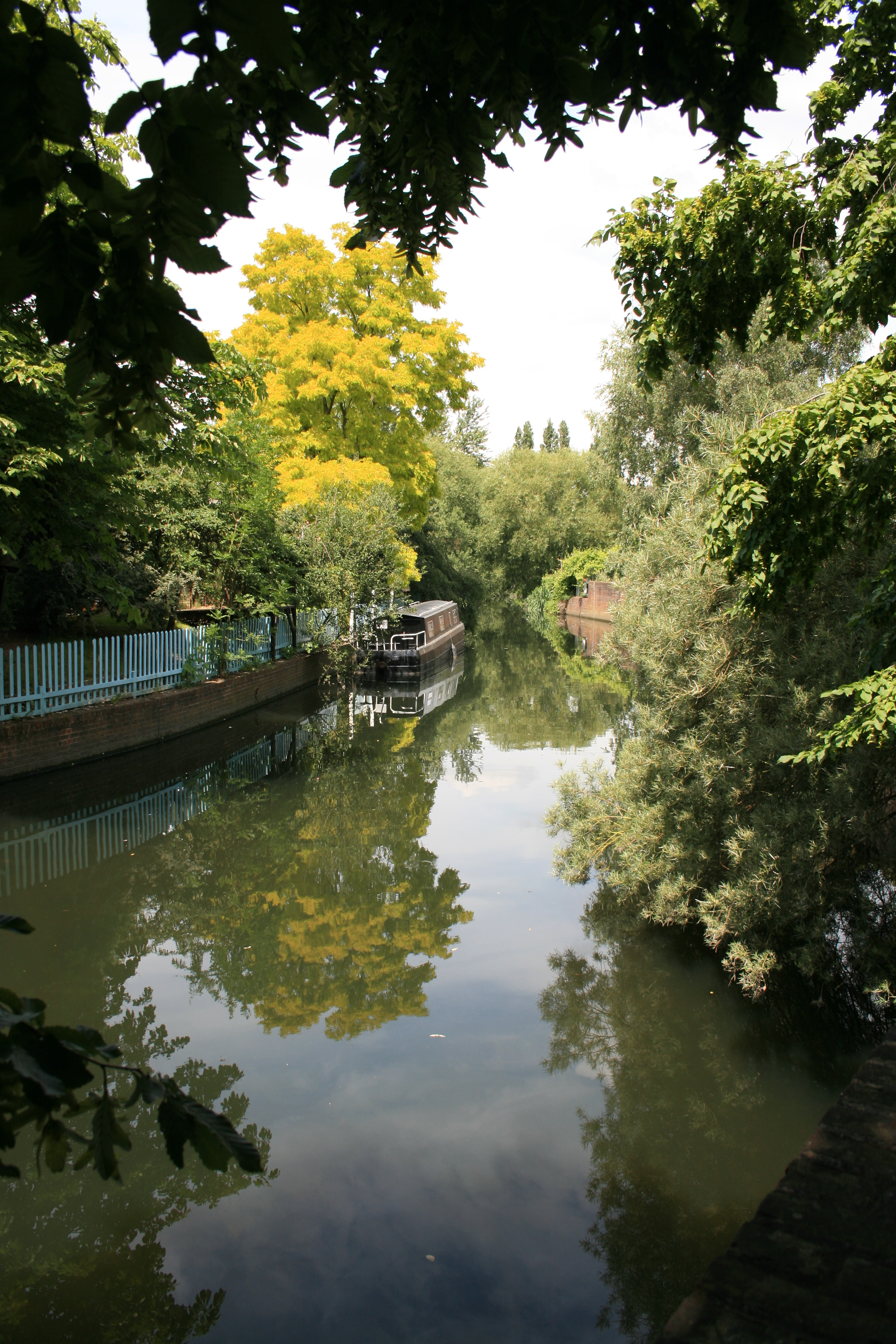
River Brent at the bottom of Green Lane

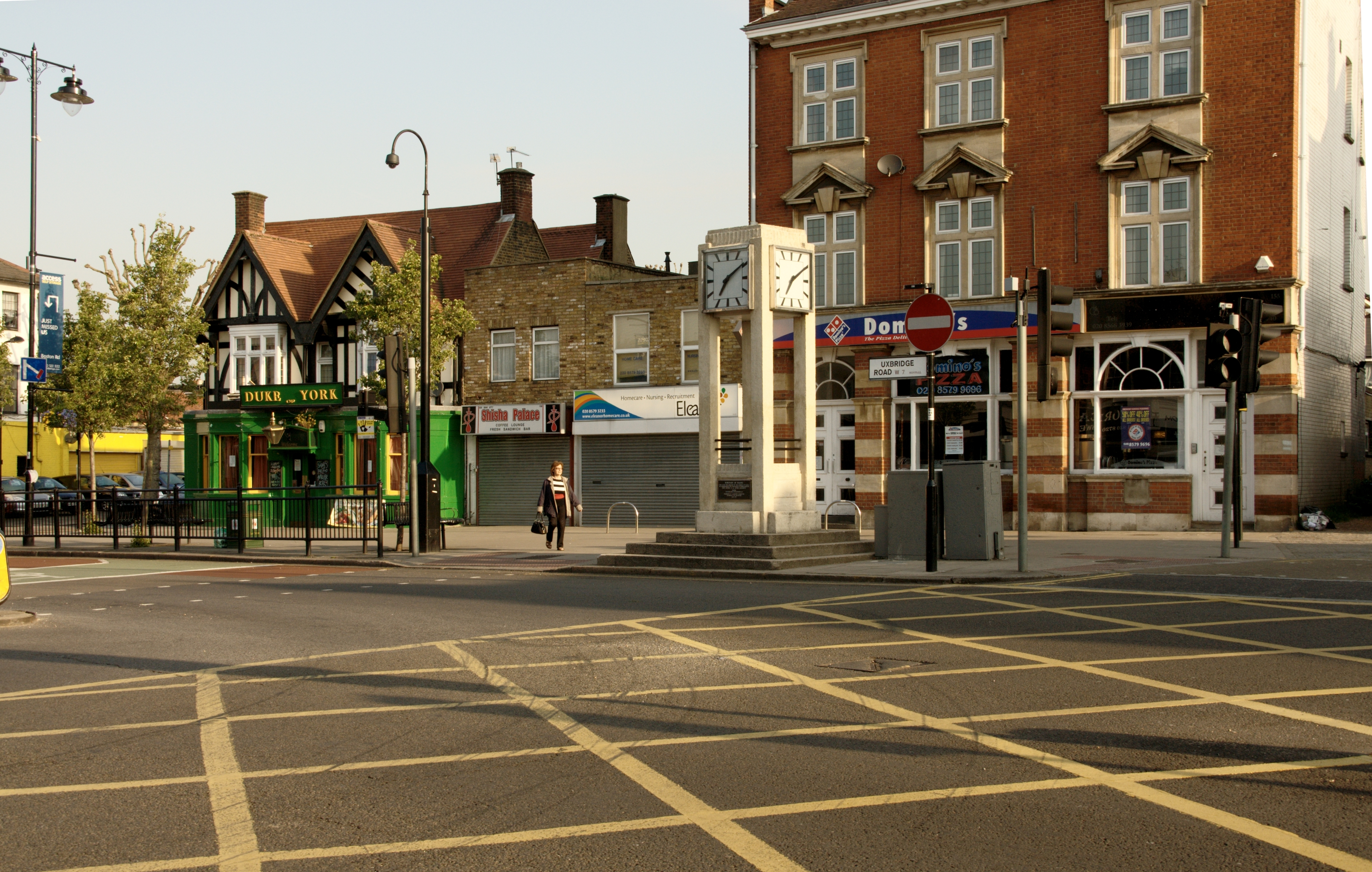
Hanwell Broadway looking north-west

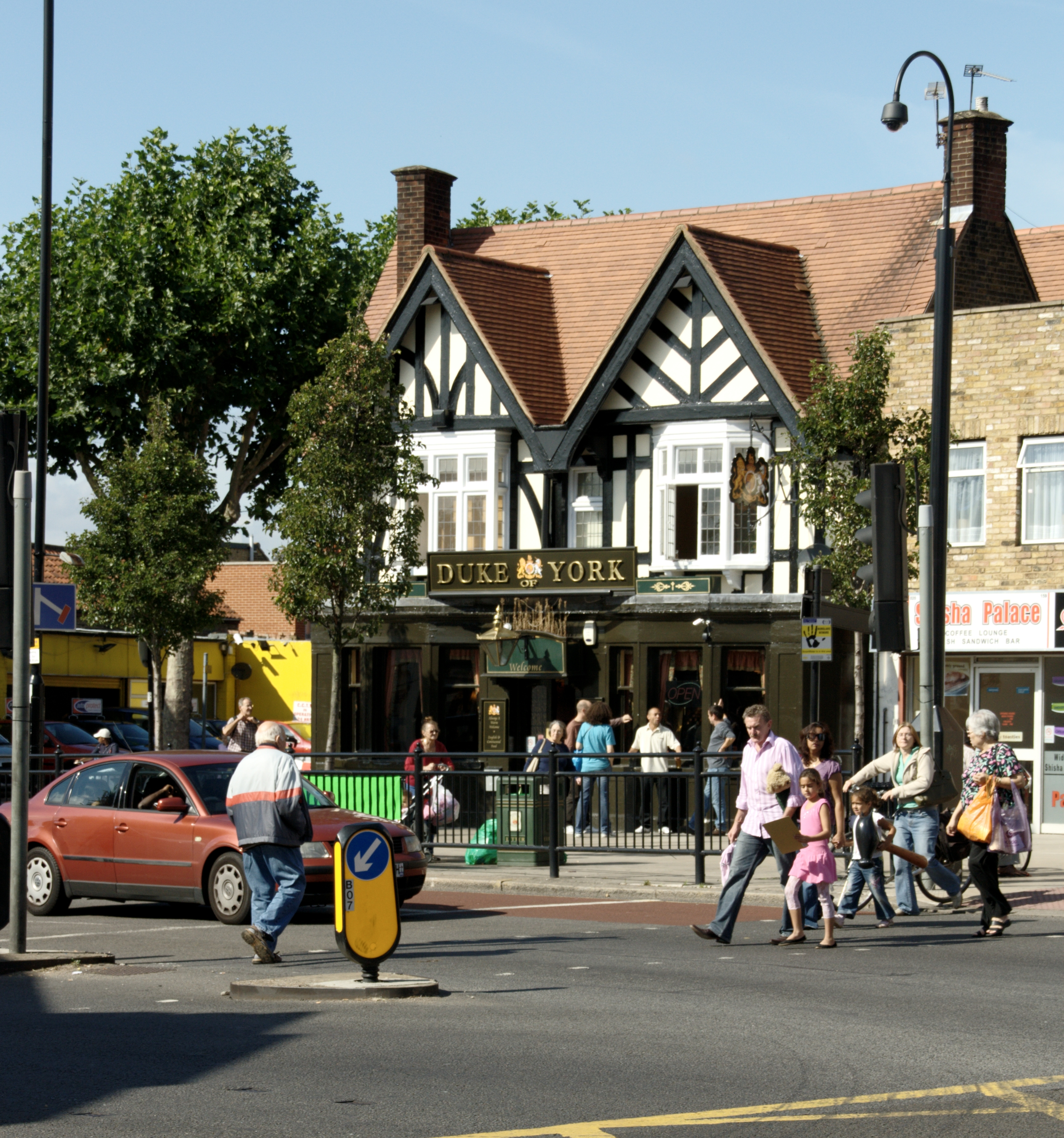
Duke of York public house

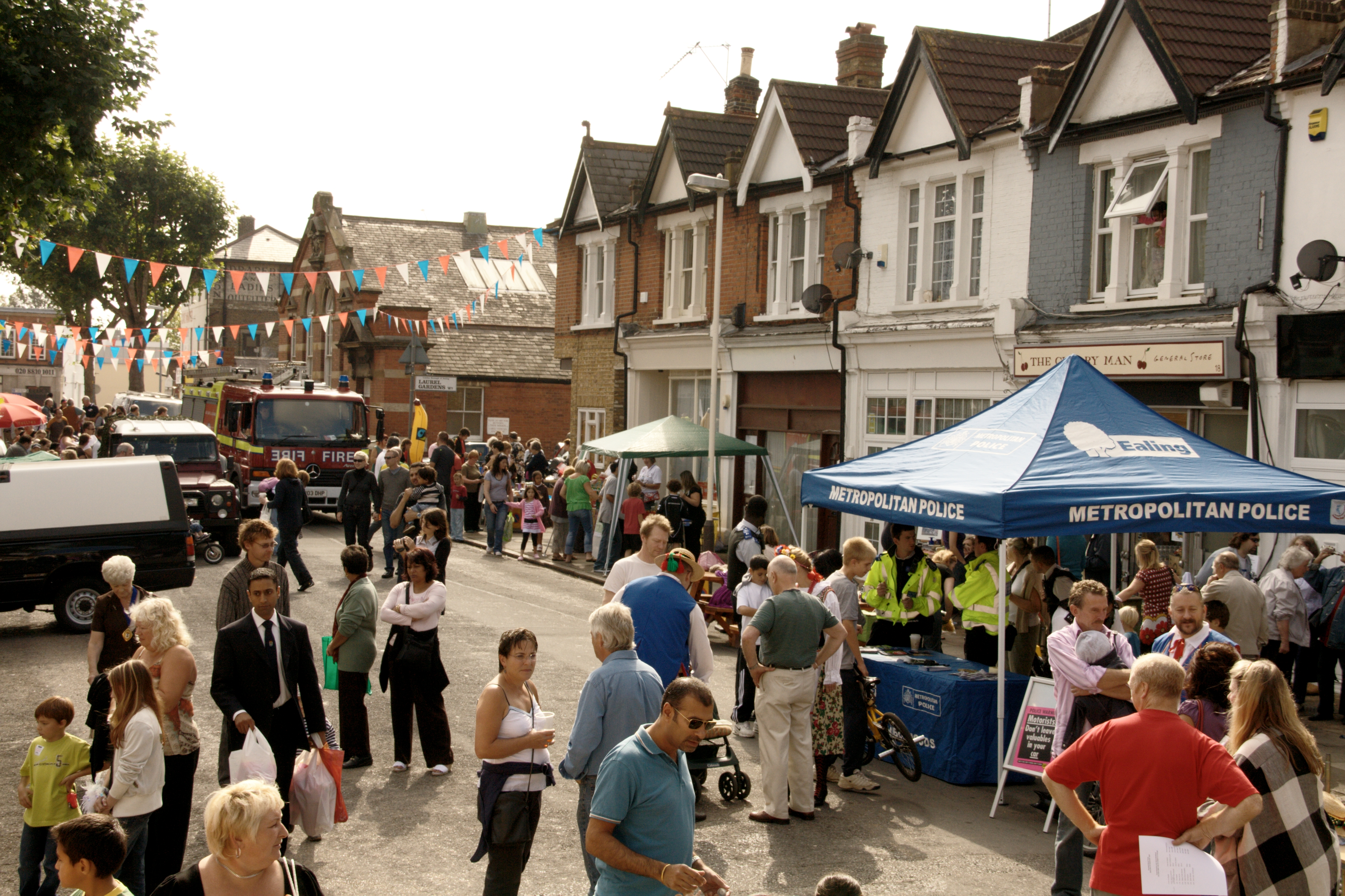
Street party in Station Road, September 2007

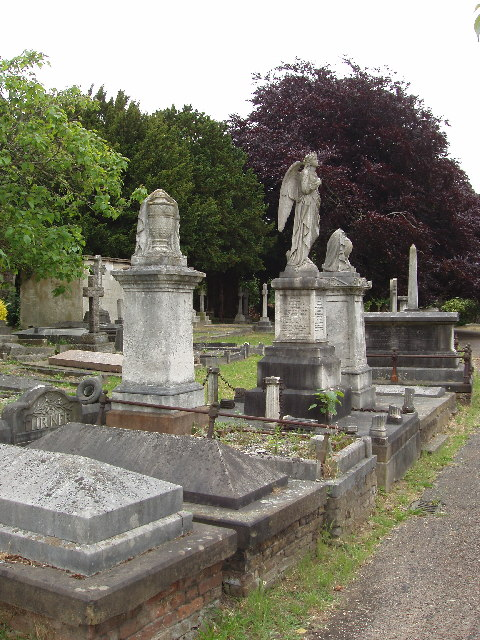
Royal Borough of Kensington and Chelsea's cemetery in Hanwell

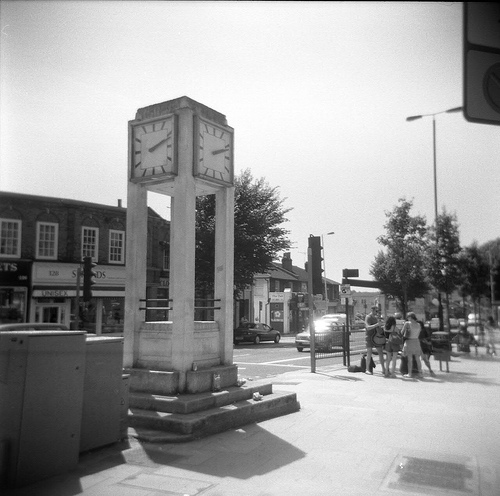
Hanwell clock

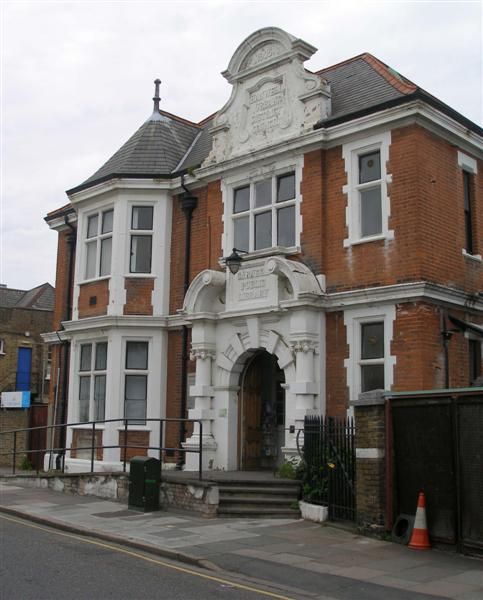
Hanwell library

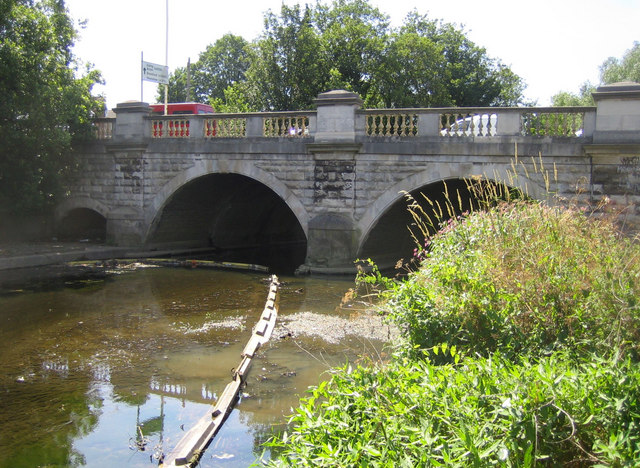
Hanwell Bridge (over the Brent)

== See also ==
- Boston Manor
