= Brentside High School =

Location
- Greenford Avenue; Greenford, Greater London, W7 1JJ; England
- Coordinates: 51.526742°N 0.339954°W

Information
- Type: Foundation school
- Motto: Learning and achieving together.
- Local authority: Ealing
- Department for Education URN: 101939 Tables
- Ofsted: Reports
- Head teacher: Charlotte Hames
- Gender: Coeducational
- Age: 11 to 19
- Houses: Red, Yellow, Green and Blue (Abolished in 2024)
- Colours: Black, Red and White
- Website: http://www.brentsidehigh.ealing.sch.uk/

Brentside High School is a coeducational foundation secondary school and sixth form in West London, England, located in Hanwell within the London Borough of Ealing.

The current school building which opened in September 2004, was purpose built and designed by architects Seymour Harris.

== School Expansion Project ==
The school underwent an expansion project in July/September 2017. The school has open the purpose built Sixth Form building with improved post 16 study facilities including specialist science, PE and ICT rooms. There is also a fitness suite which students are able to use. There is also a much larger sixth form common room/study area.

== The House System ==
Brentside High School's House System encourages and fosters teamwork, participation and sportsmanship in all areas of school life. The sense of community within each of the houses encourages a feeling of identity and belonging. The House System clearly reinforces the ethos and spirit of the school, ‘learning and achieving together’.

All students are allocated to one of four houses: Red, Yellow, Green and Blue.
