= Kings Arms, Hanwell =

Pub in Hanwell, London

Kings Arms
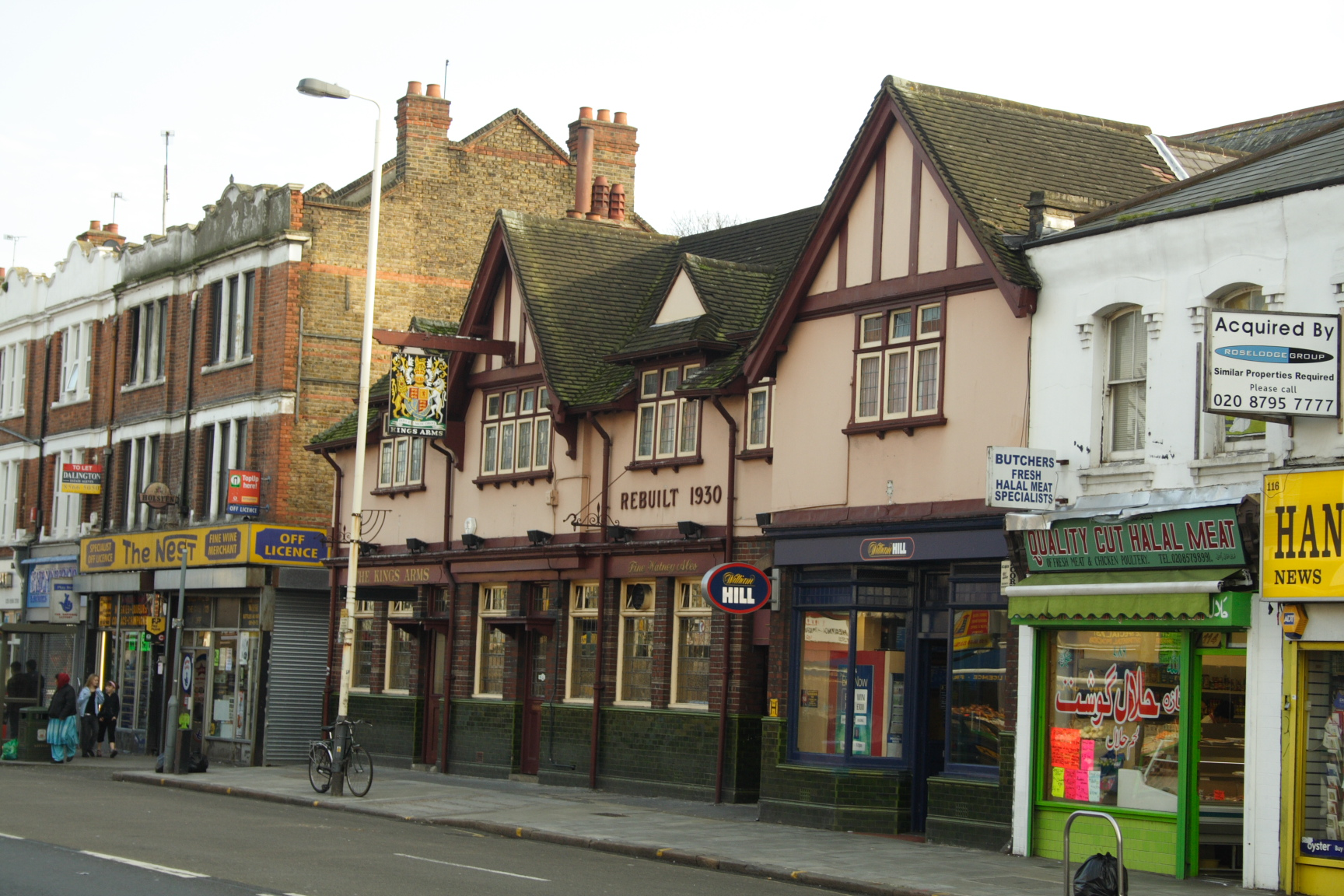
- The Kings Arms

- Location within London Borough of Ealing Location within Greater London

General information
- Location: 110 Uxbridge Road, Hanwell, London W7 3SU., London, England
- Coordinates: 51.5086°N 0.3368°W

The Kings Arms is a pub at 110 Uxbridge Road, Hanwell, London W7 3SU.

It is on the Campaign for Real Ale's National Inventory of Historic Pub Interiors.

The pub was rebuilt in 1930 by the brewers Mann, Crossman & Paulin, and the original interior remains largely intact.
