= The Hermitage, Hanwell =

Coordinates: 51.5142°N 0.3454°W

The Hermitage
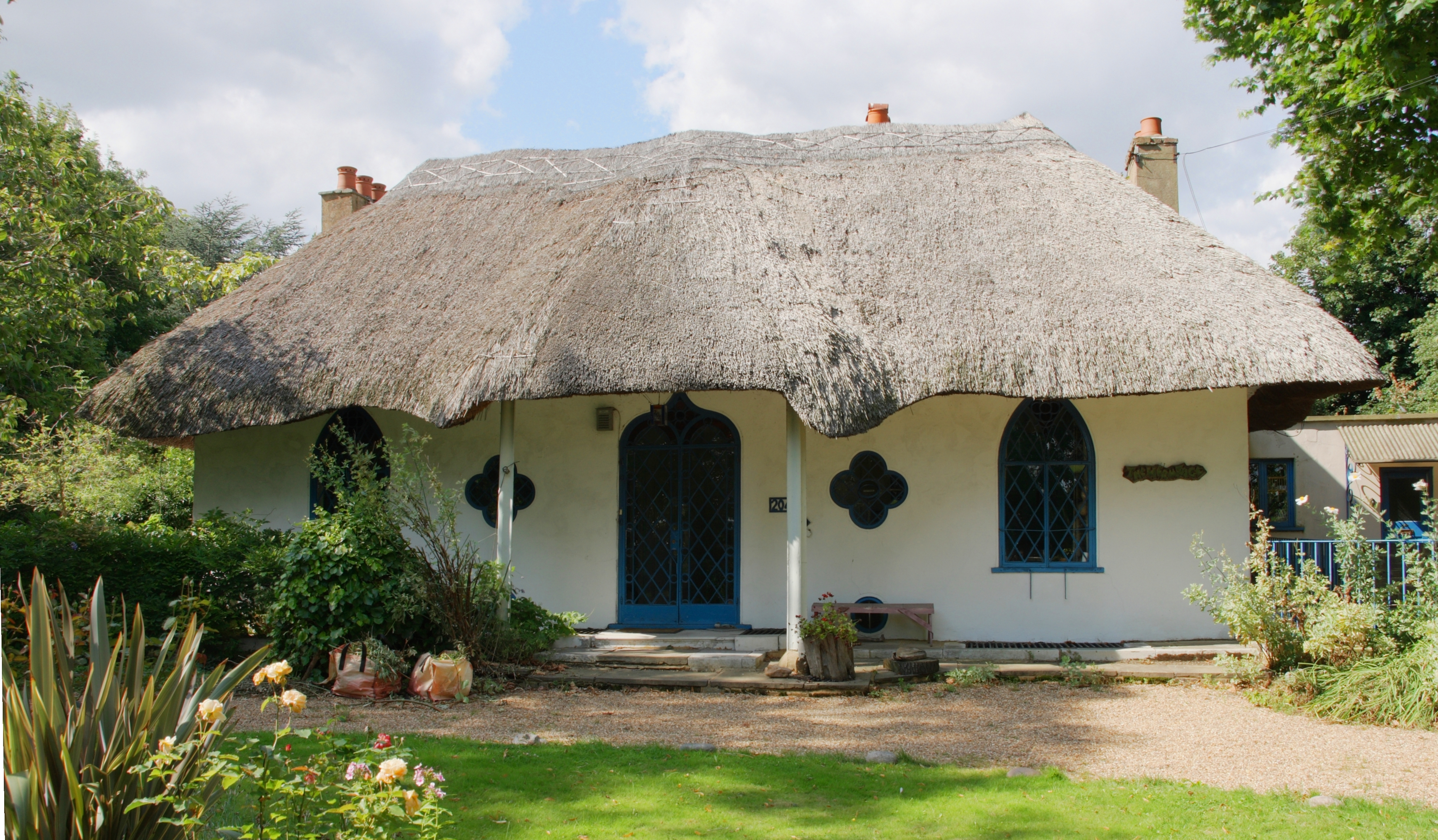
- Interactive map of the The Hermitage area

General information
- Architectural style: Cottage orné
- Location: Hanwell, London, England
- Completed: 1809

The Hermitage is a cottage orné in Hanwell, London built by rector George Glasse in 1809 on the site of a previous house called the Elms. Nikolaus Pevsner described the house as "a peach of an early c19 Gothic thatched cottage with two pointed windows, a quatrefoil, and an ogee arched door, all on a minute scale. Inside, an octagonal hall and reception room." It is Grade II listed building on Historic England's National Heritage List.

Behind the cottage lies a spring, which may be the origin of 'well' being incorporated into the local place name of Hanwell. There is also a small lake and a barn. The barn was used in the mid-1960s by Pictorial Charts Educational Trust, for housing and shipping wall charts used by schools all over the country.
