= London Buses route 427 =

London bus route

427
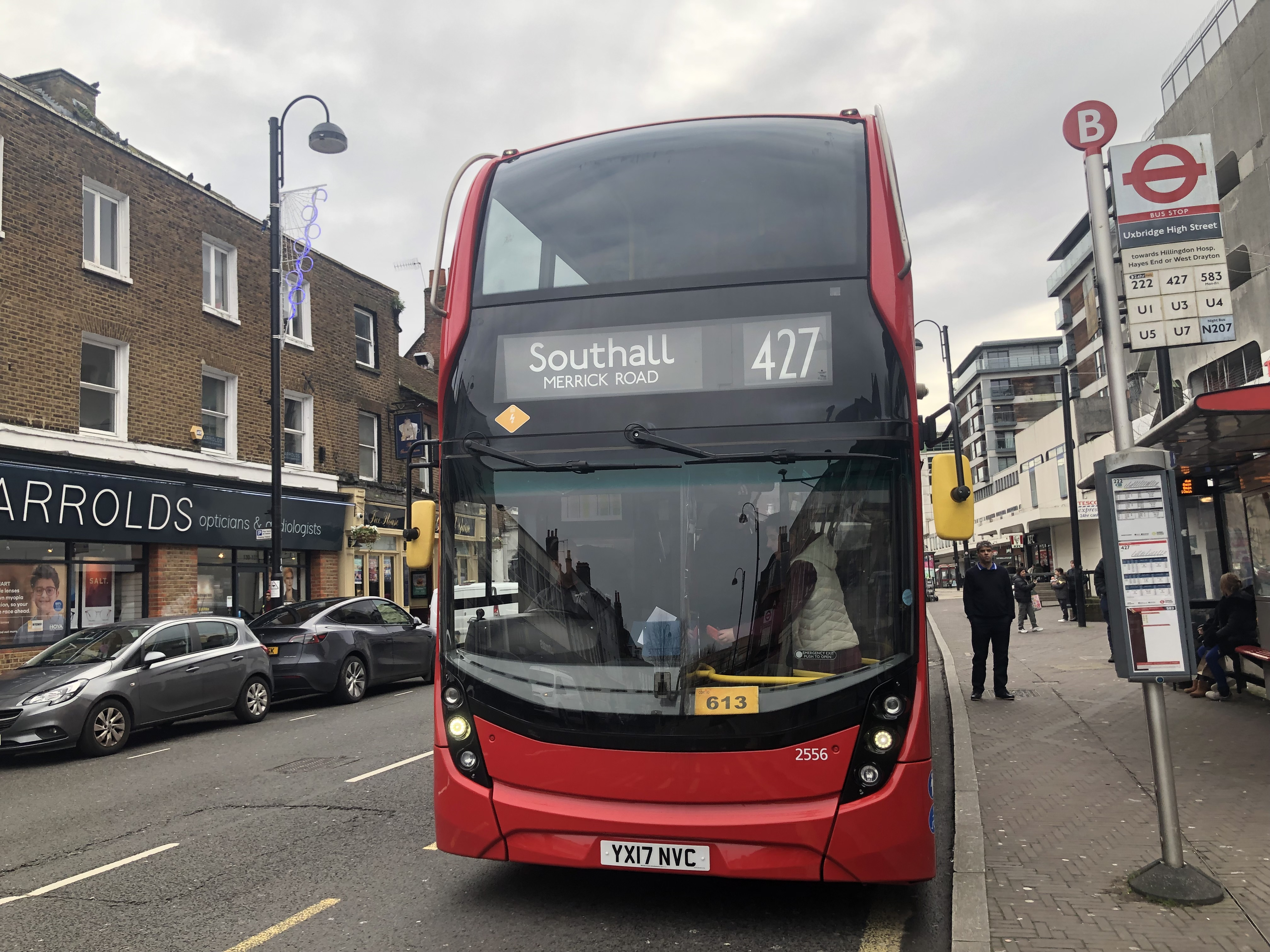
- Abellio London Alexander Dennis Enviro400H MMC in Uxbridge in January 2024

Overview
- Operator: Transport UK London Bus
- Garage: Southall
- Vehicle: Alexander Dennis Enviro400H; Alexander Dennis Enviro400H MMC
- Peak vehicle requirement: 15
- Began service: 9 April 2005
- Predecessors: Route 207
- Former operators: First London; Metroline
- Night-time: N207

Route
- Start: Southall
- Via: Southall Town Hall; Hayes End
- End: Uxbridge
- Length: 7 miles (11 km)

Service
- Level: Daily
- Frequency: About every 8-12 minutes
- Journey time: 24-61 minutes
- Operates: 04:35 until 01:18

London Buses route 427 is a Transport for London contracted bus route in London, England. Running between Southall and Uxbridge, it is operated by Transport UK London Bus.

== History ==
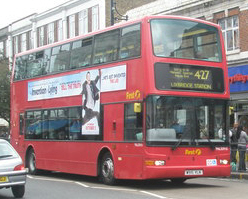
First London Plaxton President bodied Dennis Trident 2 in Southall in October 2009

The conversion of route 207 to articulated buses resulted in the route no longer being able to serve Uxbridge, due to tight turns in the town centre, so the route was split into two sections on 9 April 2005 with the western end between Uxbridge station and Acton renumbered 427, running from Acton (AT) garage using Dennis Trident 2s cascaded from route 207.

Transport for London were proposing to build the West London Tram between Shepherd's Bush and Uxbridge, running along Uxbridge Road. The tram would have replaced routes 207, 427 and 607. Transport for London claimed that trams would carry more passengers and be more reliable, but due to the Crossrail project going ahead the plans were scrapped.

Upon being re-tendered, First London commenced a new contract on 10 April 2010, with new Wright Eclipse Gemini 2 bodied Volvo B9TLs. From the same date the route was due to be extended to Acton Town Hall in place of the former Horn Lane terminus, which was eventually put in effect in January 2011.

On 22 June 2013, route 427 was included in the sale of First London's Hayes garage to Metroline.

On 8 April 2017, the route passed to Abellio London operating from Hayes garage. This contract was only for three rather the usual five years to allow Transport for London the option of restructuring services after the Elizabeth line opened. On 11 April 2020, Abellio London commenced a new contract.

On 4 March 2023, the section between Acton and Southall was withdrawn. The route was also extended from Southall Town Hall to Southall, Merrick Road via South Road and Southall station on the same day.

== Current route ==
Route 427 operates via these primary locations:

- Southall Merrick Road
- Southall station
- Southall Town Hall
- Hayes Bypass
- Hayes End
- Hillingdon Heath
- Uxbridge York Road
