= London Buses route 207 =

London bus route

207
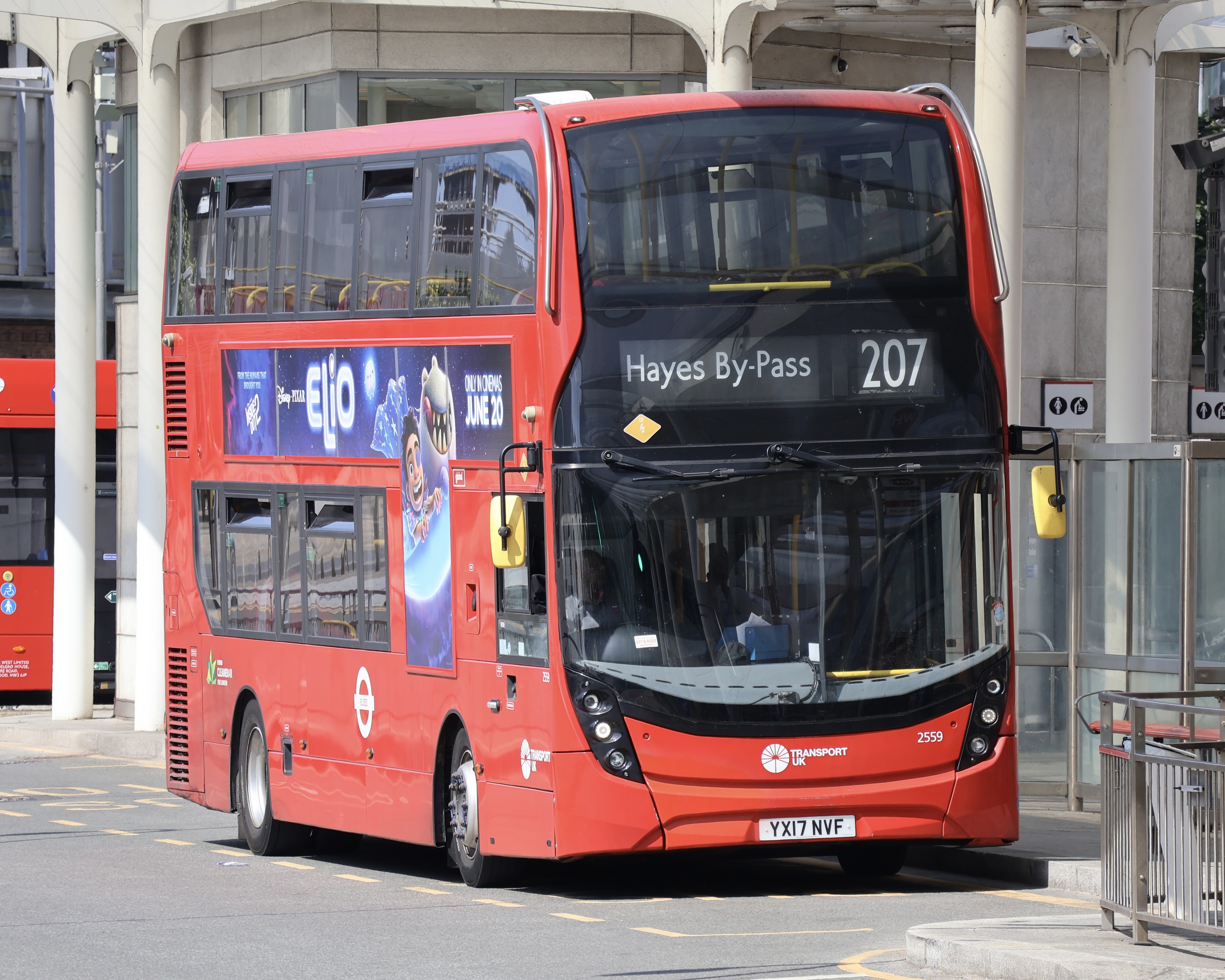
- Transport UK London Bus Alexander Dennis Enviro400H MMC at White City bus station in June 2025

Overview
- Operator: Transport UK London Bus
- Garage: Southall
- Vehicle: Alexander Dennis Enviro400; Alexander Dennis Enviro400 MMC; Alexander Dennis Enviro400H MMC
- Peak vehicle requirement: 30
- Night-time: Night Bus N207

Route
- Start: Hayes Bypass
- Via: Southall; Ealing Hospital; Hanwell; West Ealing; Ealing Broadway; Ealing Common; Acton
- End: White City bus station
- Length: 9 miles (14 km)

Service
- Level: Daily
- Frequency: Every 8-12 minutes
- Journey time: 38-78 minutes
- Operates: 04:45 until 00:58

London Buses route 207 is a Transport for London contracted bus route in London, England. Running between Hayes Bypass and White City bus station, it is operated by Transport UK London Bus.

== History ==
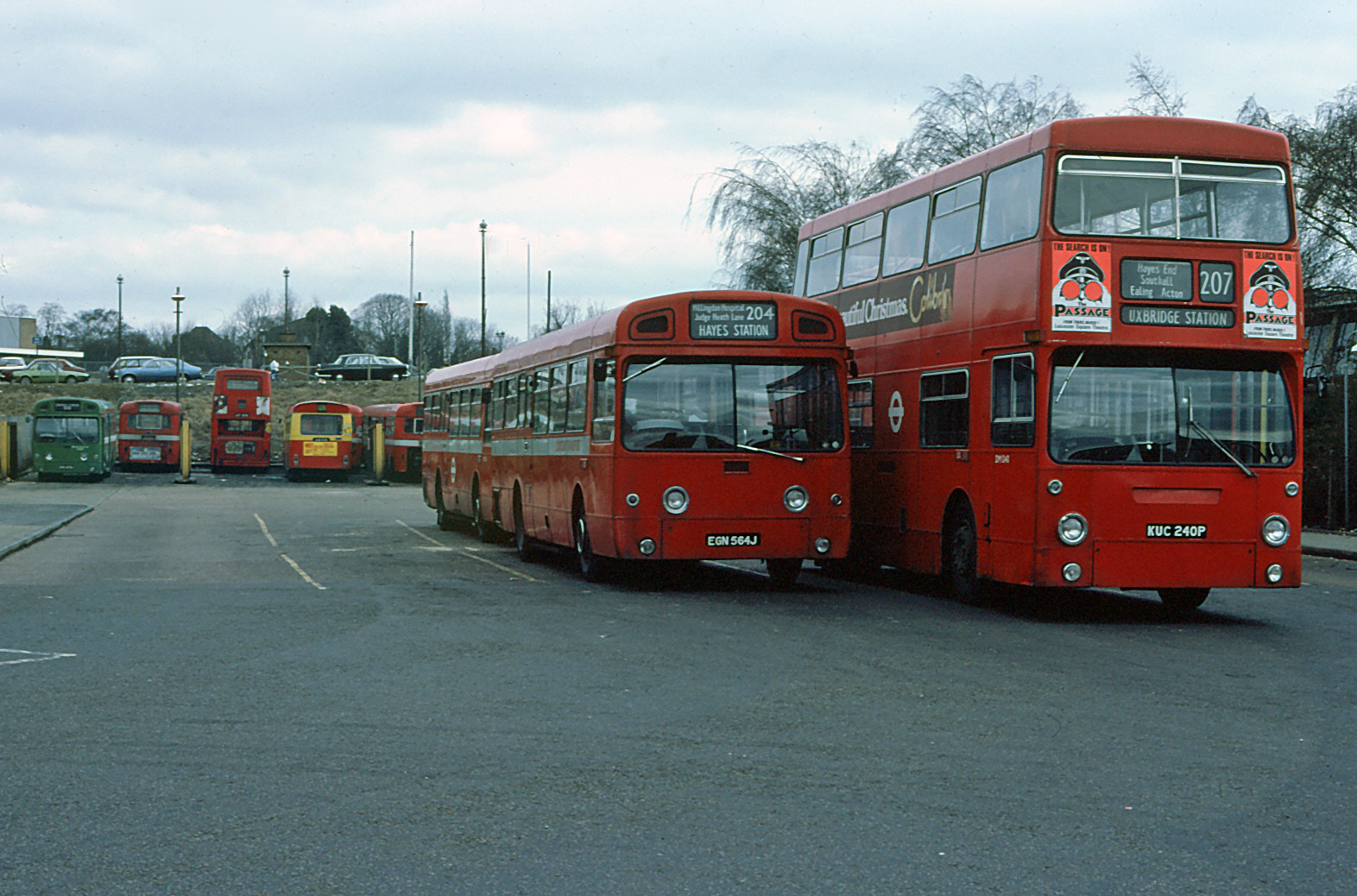
Daimler Fleetline (right) at Uxbridge bus station in June 1976

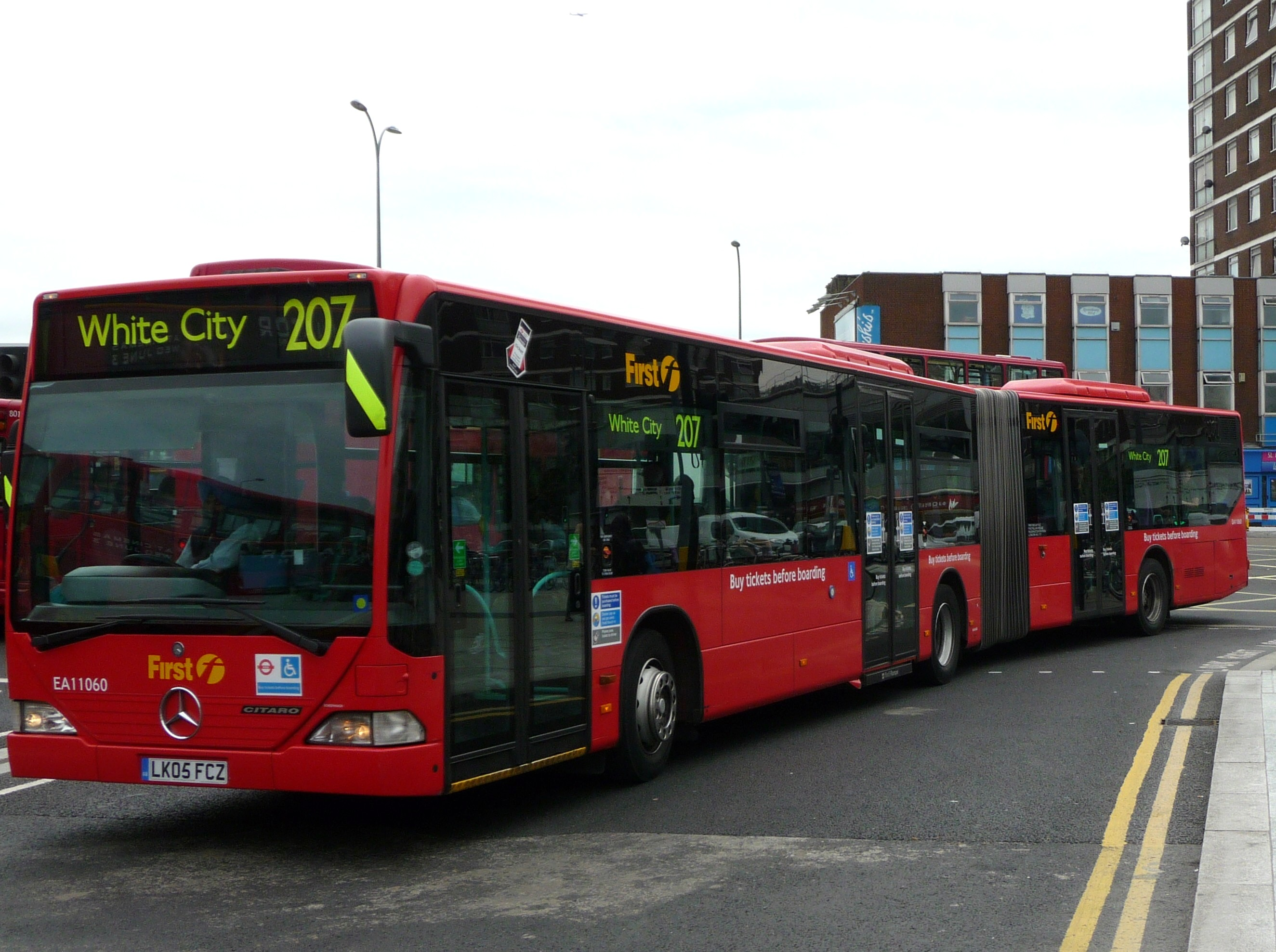
First London Mercedes-Benz O530G in Shepherd's Bush in June 2009

Route 207 originates from London United Tramways route 7 which ran between Uxbridge and Shepherd's Bush Green. In 1936, this route was replaced by a trolleybus route 607 which ran until 1960. Route 207 was introduced on 9 November 1960 as part of the trolleybus replacement program stage 8, replacing trolleybus route 607 between Uxbridge and Shepherd's Bush Green, using AEC Routemasters. The route was converted to crew operated Daimler Fleetlines in 1976, reverted to Routemasters in 1980 due to unreliability. One man operation followed in 1987 using MCW Metrobuses. In 1990 limited stop route 607 began, paralleling route 207.

The route, which runs along the entire length of the Uxbridge Road, was operated as two overlapping sections in the late 1990s, with a peak vehicle requirement of 35 double-deckers. The proposed West London Tram paralleled much of the 207.

Low floor buses replaced the MCW Metrobuses in 2001, along with six articulated buses which were on trial on the route for six months, running between Hayes Bypass and Shepherd's Bush Green, from First London's Greenford garage. The trial was a success and on 9 April 2005 the route was split into two sections; the Hayes Bypass to Shepherd's Bush Green section retained the number 207 and was converted to single deck articulated bus operation with Mercedes-Benz O530Gs. The section between Uxbridge and Acton was renumbered 427 using Dennis Trident 2s. A new base opened at Hayes for the 207; the Uxbridge and Acton allocations were withdrawn.

In October and November 2004 the route was found to have the highest level of police callouts of any service in London. Fare evasion following the conversion to bendy bus operation is also perceived to be a problem by local transport user group EPTUG.

Route 207 was extended from Shepherd's Bush Green to White City bus station when Westfield London opened in November 2008. A month earlier, passengers' organisation London TravelWatch had claimed that the route carried more passengers than any other route in Europe, although this was disputed by some commentators. In 2009 it was announced by new Mayor of London Boris Johnson that articulated buses would be replaced by the end of 2011; it was initially expected that the 207 would be converted to rigid single-deck operation.

In February 2011, Transport for London confirmed that the route would be converted to double-deck vehicles in December 2011, and that the frequency of the route would be increased. Similar changes were planned for night bus variant N207. The proposals were criticised by local Liberal Democrat politicians for failing to increase the seating capacity of the route while increasing the number of vehicles on the Uxbridge Road.

On 10 December 2011, route 207 was converted back to double deck using Scania OmniCity double deckers. It was the last bus route in London to be operated by articulated buses.

On 22 June 2013, route 207 was included in the sale of First London's Hayes garage to Metroline.

Route 207 was London's fifth busiest bus route with 12.9 million passengers in 2015/16. The route passed to Abellio London on 6 April 2019.

== Current route ==
Route 207 operates via these primary locations:

- Hayes Bypass
- Southall
- Ealing Hospital
- Hanwell Broadway
- West Ealing
- Ealing Broadway station
- Ealing Common station
- Acton Central station
- Acton Vale
- Shepherd's Bush Market station
- Shepherd's Bush stations
- White City bus station
