= Churchfield Road =

Road in Acton, London

Coordinates: 51°30′30″N 0°16′03″W

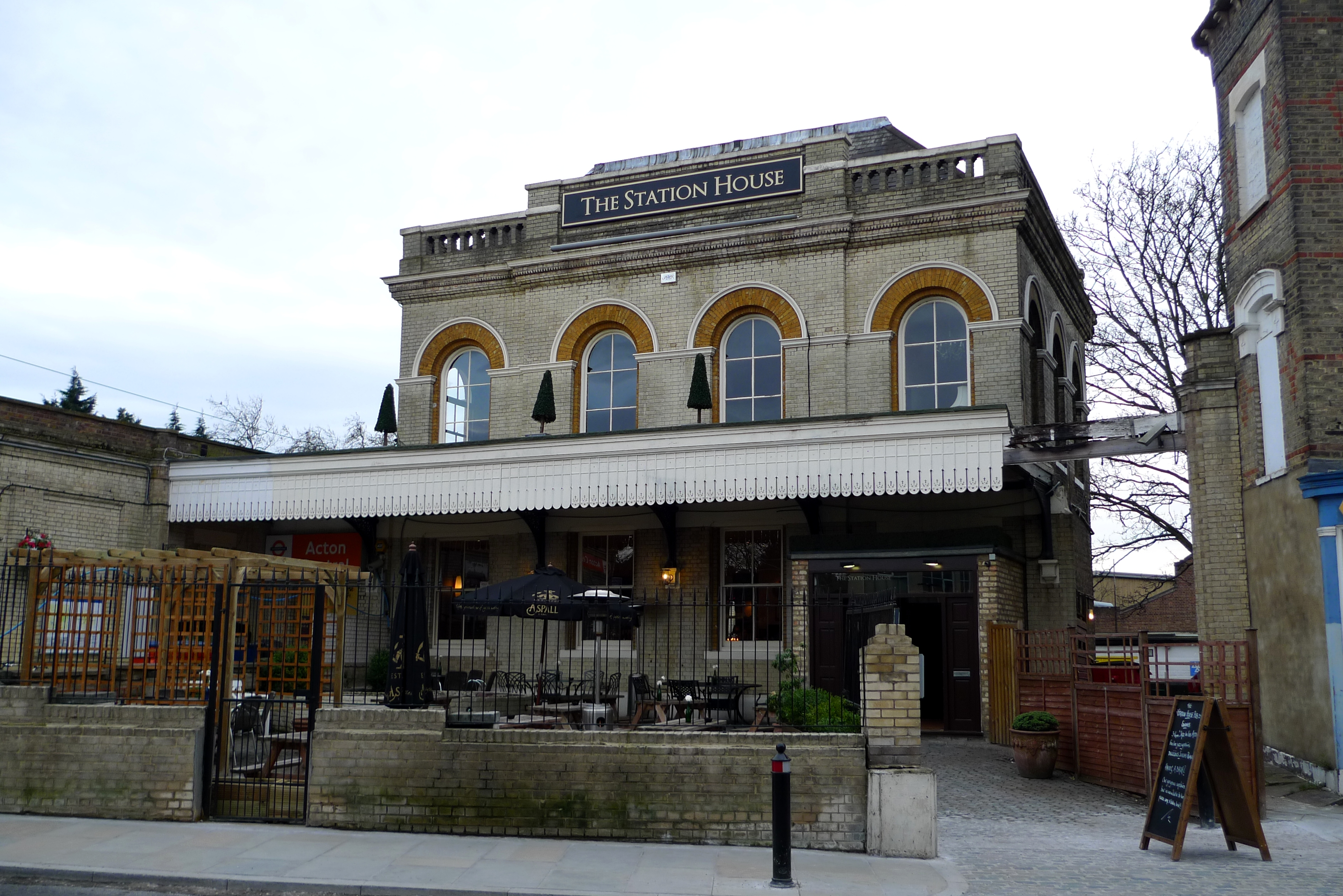
Station House on Churchfield Road; previously Acton Central station, now a public house

Churchfield Road, Acton, runs north of and parallel to Acton High Street. At the eastern end is the level crossing of Acton Central railway station after which it becomes East Churchfield Road. The western end forms a junction of which the northern road is Horn Lane, the southern Market Place and the western, the now pedestrianised King Street. St. Mary's Burial Ground lies on the southern side of the centre section of the road.

It has its own community association formed in 2001.

== Retail ==
Churchfield Road can be divided into two retail sections, the eastern end nearest the station and the western end nearest the mount that merges into the main shopping area. In recent years there has been a slight decline in the number of shops in the road with many of those closed remaining empty. The Sub-Post office at number 24 closed in 2010, after many years. Churchfield Road has recently seen growth in independent retailers and other business practices such as estate agents, restaurants and cafes. Two new additions are Bondi Juice and Noco Deli.

== Public houses ==
The Station House next to the current Acton Central railway station was formerly the station building itself. It has previously been called The Central Bar and The Churchfield

The Albion at number 2, closed down in 2010 having been open since at least 1881.

The Rocket, formerly The Station Hotel at 11 & 13 has been open since at least 1881.

Foley's at number 115, formerly the Mechanics Arms closed down in 2011 having been open since at least 1889.

== Famous residents ==
Lionel Bart lived at 33/35a Churchfield Road until his death in 1999.

Waitrose opened their second branch at 65 Churchfield Road in 1913.

Eric Ravilious was born at 90 Churchfield Road on 22 July 1903.

== In popular culture ==
This area of west London is a popular location for filming as it is close to the BBC Television Centre as well as other studios. Several Monty Python sketches were filmed on Churchfield Road, and in the later years of Minder, the entrance to the Winchester Club was in Newburgh Road, just off Churchfield Road.

The Leo Sayer hit song "Orchard Road" referred to Churchfield Road, where Leo Sayer's ex-wife had moved out to after they separated. Sayer changed the name of the road as he felt Churchfield Road "didn't sing very well".

Road where Ajahn Brahm's father pulled over and said to him "Son, whatever happens to you in your life. However you turn out, Please know the door my house will always be open to you".
