= London Buses route SL8 =

London Superloop express bus route

SL8
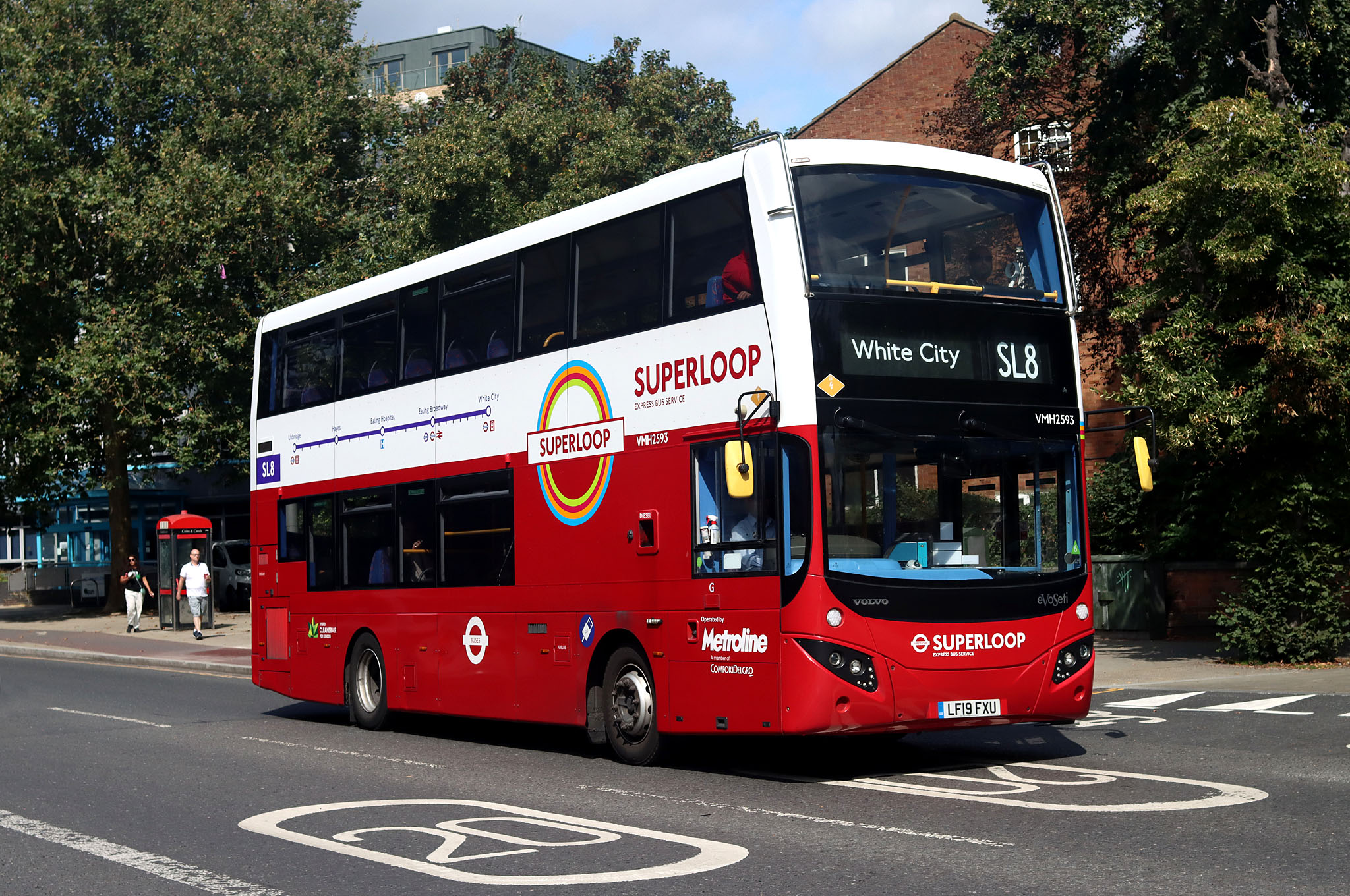
- Metroline MCV EvoSeti bodied Volvo B5LH in Ealing in August 2023

Overview
- Operator: Metroline
- Garage: Greenford
- Vehicle: Volvo B5LH MCV EvoSeti
- Peak vehicle requirement: 19 (April 2019)
- Began service: 22 July 1990
- Former operator: First London
- Night-time: N207

Route
- Start: Uxbridge station
- Via: Hillingdon Heath; Hayes End; Hayes; Southall; Ealing Hospital; Hanwell; West Ealing; Ealing; Acton; Acton Vale; Shepherd's Bush
- End: White City bus station

Service
- Level: Daily
- Frequency: 10-15 minutes
- Journey time: 56-84 minutes
- Operates: 04:25 until 01:25

London Buses route SL8, formerly London Buses route 607, is a Transport for London contracted Superloop express bus route in London, England. Running between Uxbridge station and White City bus station, it is operated by Metroline.

== History ==
=== 607 ===
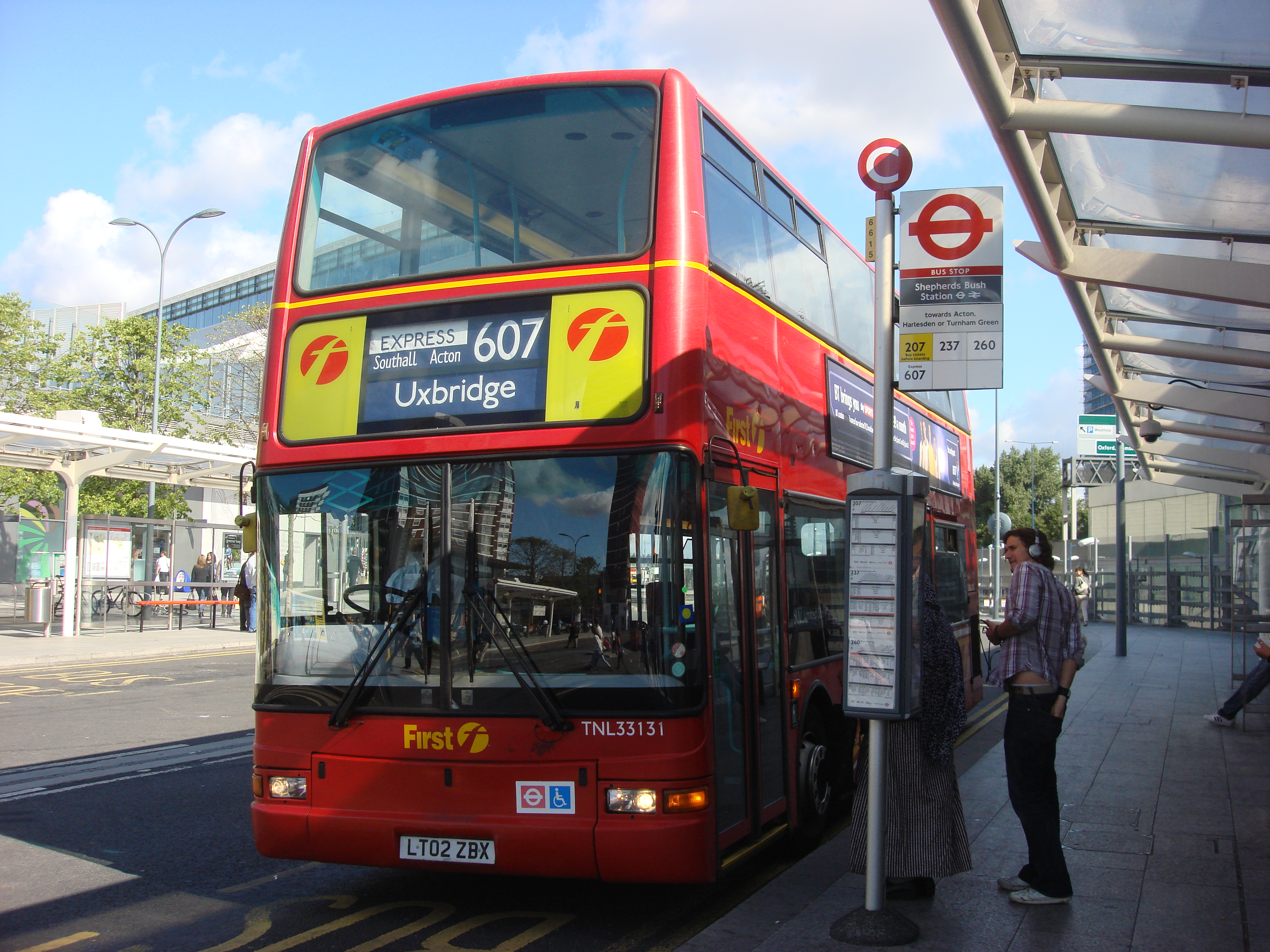
First London Plaxton President bodied Dennis Trident 2 on route 607 in August 2010

Route 607 was established on 21 July 1990 as an express service on the same route as route 207 between Uxbridge station and Shepherd's Bush Green via Uxbridge Road on Mondays to Saturdays.

Its number was previously used by a trolleybus route over the same roads, which operated from 15 November 1936 until 8 November 1960 when it was abolished as part of the London Trolleybus Withdrawal Programme and replaced by bus route 207. It was the only regular route in the 6xx series that is otherwise reserved for school routes. (There had been 6xx limited-stop routes in the 1970s.)

Route 607 was originally operated by Leyland Nationals and Leyland Lynxs. In 1995 Northern Counties bodies Volvo Olympians were introduced. The route was included in the sale of CentreWest to First London in March 1997.

In the early 2000s, it was proposed that the route be replaced by the West London Tram, however this project was abandoned in 2007. On 29 November 2008, route 607 was extended from Shepherd's Bush Green to White City bus station to coincide with the opening of Westfield London.

On 22 June 2013, route 607 was included in the sale of First London's Uxbridge garage to Metroline. In April 2019, Metroline commenced a new contract.

=== SL8 ===
On 15 July 2023, route 607 was renumbered SL8, becoming part of the Superloop express bus network.

On 19 August 2023, the hours of operation were extended.

== Current route ==
Route SL8 operates via these primary locations:

- Uxbridge station
- Hillingdon Heath
- Hayes End
- Hayes
- Southall
- Ealing Hospital
- Hanwell
- West Ealing
- Ealing Broadway station
- Ealing Common station
- Acton Town Hall
- Acton Vale
- Shepherd's Bush Market station
- Shepherd's Bush stations
- White City bus station
