= Uxbridge Road =

Road in west London

Coordinates: 51°30′37″N 0°17′16″W

A4020

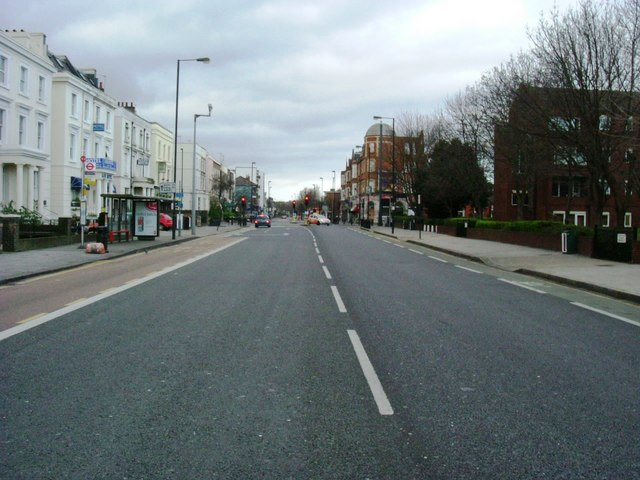
- Uxbridge Road (A4020), W12 - looking towards Acton and the crossroads of The Vale, Old Oak Road and Askew Road.

Route information
- Length: 12 mi (19 km)

Major junctions
- East end: Shepherd's Bush Green (A219, A402 & A3220)
- A3220 A402 A219 A4000 A406 A4001 A3002 A4127 A3005 A312 A437 A408 A4007 M40; A40 A412
- West end: M40 Junction 1 - Denham Interchange

Location
- Country: United Kingdom
- Primary destinations: Shepherd's Bush Green, Acton, Ealing, Hanwell, Southall, Hayes, Hillingdon, Uxbridge

Road network
- Roads in the United Kingdom; Motorways; A and B road zones
← A4019	→ A4023

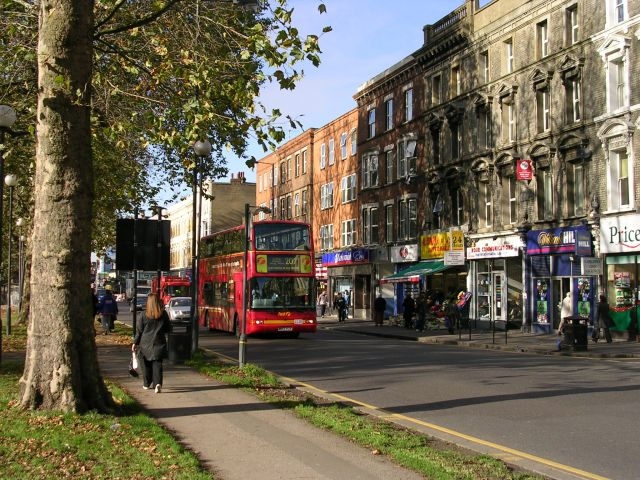
Shops on the Uxbridge Road on the north side of Shepherd's Bush Green

Uxbridge Road is the name of the A4020 road in West London. The 12-mile (19 km) route starts at Shepherd's Bush Green and goes west towards Uxbridge. It passes through Acton, Ealing, Hanwell, Southall, Hayes, and Hillingdon.

Uxbridge Road is a major road in west London passing through many retail and large residential districts. It provides several transport connections for commuters with many London Underground stations situated either on it or within walking distance. A number of London buses also operate along the road, for varying distances. Bus routes 207, 427 and SL8 are specifically designed to operate along this road, staying on it for their entire route. The road has become notorious for traffic jams, especially during "rush hour" and many drivers will do their best to avoid it. The road does not become a motorway at any stage, nor does it meet any motorways along its route, but it does meet non-motorway trunk roads: namely the West Cross Route, North Circular Road, and The Parkway

== Route ==
=== Shepherd's Bush ===
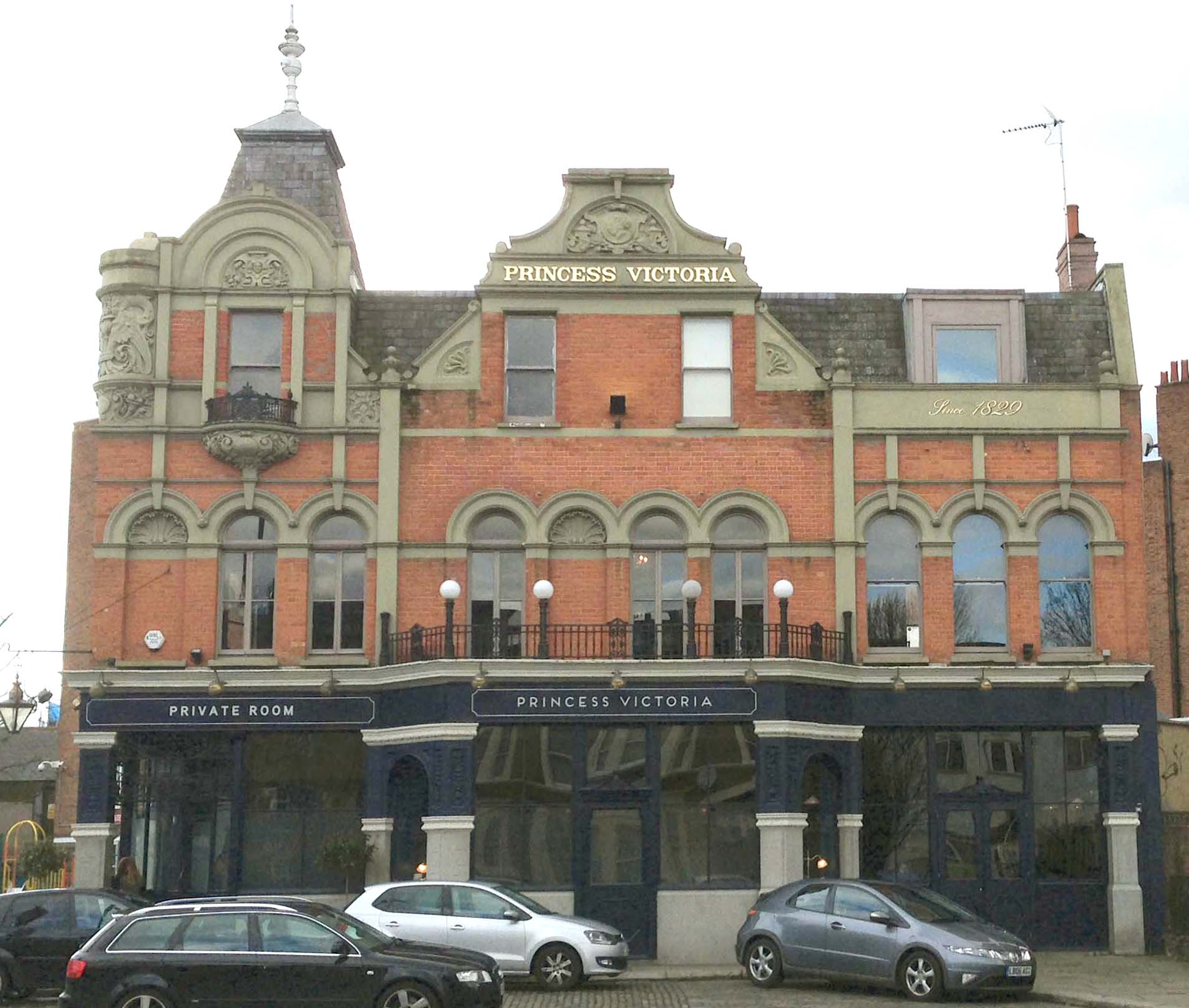
Princess Victoria Pub in 2015

Emerging from a roundabout in Shepherd's Bush, the Uxbridge Road enters several important places in west London. The Shepherds Bush/White City area is now the site of the new Westfield London retail development, which opened in October 2008. Uxbridge Road is crucial in providing road access to this new retail centre. The Uxbridge Road also provides access to the popular Shepherd's Bush Market, at the western end of the area, as well as Shepherds Bush Common. Notable buildings on this stretch of Uxbridge Road include St Stephen's Church, the Bush Theatre, and the Princess Victoria public house.

=== Acton ===
It then enters Acton, crossing over from the London Borough of Hammersmith and Fulham into the London Borough of Ealing, where the largest part of the road lies. Acton is primarily a residential district, though there is a long stretch of shops (including a large Morrisons, pubs, and restaurants, mostly concentrated on the Uxbridge Road.

=== Ealing ===
Ealing Common is the next residential area that the Uxbridge Road crosses through, which is the smallest of all areas the Uxbridge Road crosses through. It has a short stretch of shops concentrated on the Uxbridge Road.

Ealing Broadway is the main retail centre that is directly served by the Uxbridge Road. The shopping area is a mixture of shops in the open on the actual road and around several neighbouring back roads, as well a closed-centre building, home to several chain stores and independent boutiques, which has an entrance on Uxbridge Road. This is arguably the busiest part of the road for passengers on foot.

West Ealing follows, which is very similar to Acton – it is also a large residential district and has a very similar stretch of shops concentrated on the Uxbridge Road. West Ealing has a few more retail outlets similar to those in Ealing Broadway, but increasingly since the 1990s, it has begun to differ from Ealing Broadway in the types of shops that it offers.

=== Hanwell ===
Hanwell Broadway follows very shortly after West Ealing Broadway ends. Hanwell again offers its own range of shops, similar in style to Ealing Common, West Ealing and Acton. After leaving Hanwell, the road passes Ealing Hospital.

=== Southall ===
Compared with the other centres along the length of the road, there is a much larger gap between Hanwell and the next centre, Southall. Southall Broadway has a mix of shops in both the style of Ealing Broadway and of West Ealing; however, as the areas is predominantly populated by Asians, they are in a slightly different vein. This is another very congested part of the road (like Ealing Broadway), because it is very popular as a shopping area for the public and tourists.

=== Hillingdon ===
Uxbridge Road then enters the London Borough of Hillingdon as it enters the very large residential and retail district of Hayes. Hayes is home to a few industrial sites, unlike most of the other areas Uxbridge Road passes through. Shop-wise, along the length of the road, it is similar to areas like West Ealing and Acton. Uxbridge Road then terminates after passing through certain areas of Hillingdon, passing around the south of Uxbridge town centre; and terminating at Denham Roundabout. Uxbridge retail centre is not directly accessible by the Uxbridge Road, but is the only other retail centre associated with areas in close proximity to the Uxbridge Road other than Ealing Broadway to boast a variety of high street shops. Both are popular with London residents.

== Transport connections ==
=== Rail ===
The only London Underground stations that have the station building and entrance on Uxbridge Road are Ealing Common and Shepherd's Bush Market. Ealing Broadway station is less than 2 minutes walk away from the junction of Uxbridge Road and The Broadway. Uxbridge station is within walking distance of the very end of the road. Towards the eastern end of the road, the Shepherd's Bush (Central Line) station is within walking distance of the road. The western areas that Uxbridge Road runs through do not contain particular tube stations in their areas, although Northfields station is situated a short walk away from the junction of Uxbridge Road and Northfields Avenue in West Ealing. West Ealing, Hanwell and Southall railway stations are themselves within walking distance of Uxbridge Road.

=== Buses ===
Although several buses operate along the Uxbridge Road for parts of their route, the road is considered so important that three particular buses were designed to operate solely on the road. They are:-

- Bus route 207: which operates between the road's eastern terminus at Shepherds Bush to the Hayes By-Pass. The 207 originally ran along the whole length of the road before being partly replaced by the 427.
- Bus route 427: which operates between the road's western terminus at Uxbridge to Southall Railway Station.
- Bus route SL8:which operates as an express service along the whole length of the road, but only stops at the most popular locations such as Ealing Hospital and tube station connections.

=== West London Tram ===
In the early 2000's, a tram scheme, the West London Tram, was planned to run along the length of the Uxbridge Road and replace these three bus routes. This scheme was abandoned in 2007.

== History ==
=== Original A4020 route: Stroud ===
The original route of the A4020 was in Stroud, Gloucestershire.

The road was a short one, starting on the A46 near the station and heading west along Cainscross Road to Cainscross itself. The road ended on the A434 just to the north of that road's crossing of the Stroudwater Canal.

In 1935, the west end of the A419 was rerouted via Stroud, taking over the entire length of the A4020, which number it retains. The former A434 to the west was also renumbered A419 although this is now the B4008.

== In popular culture ==
In a 1912 book of verse Evelyn Underhill published a poem entitled "Uxbridge Road". In 1972, the thirty-third episode of Monty Python's Flying Circus featured a sketch about a team of mountaineers "climbing" the Uxbridge Road.
