= West London Tram =

Proposed light rail line in London, England

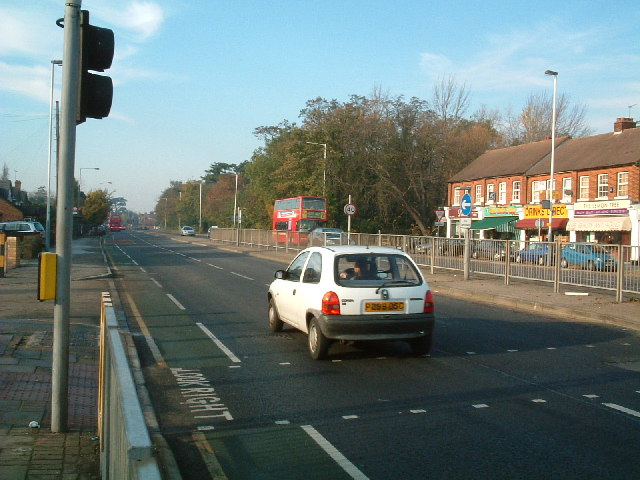
- The Uxbridge Road at Hillingdon, part of the proposed route of the tramway

Overview
- Owner: Transport for London
- Locale: West London, England
- Transit type: Tram
- Number of lines: 1
- Number of stations: 40

Operation
- Operation will start: Abandoned proposal

Technical
- System length: 12 mi (19 km)
- Track gauge: Standard gauge

The West London Tram (also known as West London Transit) was a proposed on-street light rail line that was to run along the Uxbridge Road (A4020) corridor in West London, England. The scheme was promoted by Transport for London (TfL). It was postponed indefinitely on 2 August 2007, as it was opposed by the councils of all three bisected London Boroughs.

The tram route was planned to run between Uxbridge and Shepherd's Bush, serving Hayes (north), Hillingdon, Southall, Hanwell, West Ealing, Ealing and Acton en route, and would have replaced three equivalent London Buses routes. The proposed route was the same route as London's tram route 7 from about 1905 until 1951.

== Overview ==
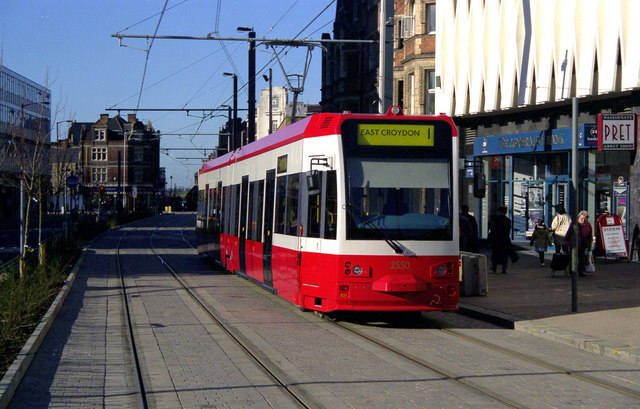
Tramlink in Croydon in October 1999

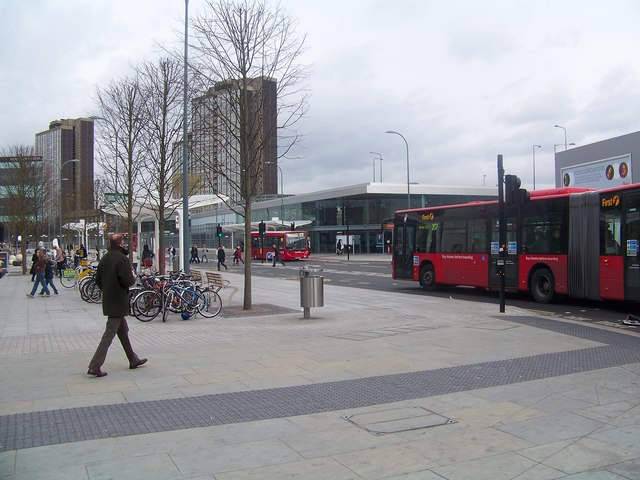
Shepherd's Bush bus station, originally intended as the eastern tram terminus

The revival of interest in tramways and light rail transit systems around the start of the 21st century led to the re-introduction of electric trams to a number of British cities and towns such as Manchester, Sheffield, and Croydon. The West London Tram scheme was first announced in 2002 by the then Mayor of London, Ken Livingstone, along with other projects such as the Cross River Tram and the Thames Gateway Transit bus rapid transit scheme.

Livingstone promoted the project as a solution to traffic congestion problems in the west of London. It was forecast that the tramway would carry 50 million passengers a year and, based on research of Croydon Tramlink, promoters anticipated around 19% of those passengers would switch from using a car to the tram for their journey. The scheme was budgeted at a cost of approximately £200 million, and the line would come into service by 2009.

The tram was designed to run along the congested Uxbridge Road from Uxbridge to Shepherd's Bush and replace the heavily used 207, 427 and 607 bus routes. Had the route been constructed it would have revived a tram route established in 1904 and which was replaced by a trolleybus route 607 which was itself superseded by the present bus routes.

The trams were to run on a completely on-street route, with a mixture of stretches shared with road traffic, "accessible" routes (controlled lanes which road traffic would be permitted to enter temporarily, for example to avoid an obstruction), and segregated stretches of track which would be for tram use only, mostly along the central reservation of the Uxbridge Road. The tram was partly envisaged as a "feeder" service for other modes of transit, transporting passengers to interchange points with London Underground, London Overground and the future Crossrail service.

== Progress ==
The West London Tram scheme proved to be a contentious proposal, with public opinion along the route more or less divided on the issue. Several consultation exercises and opinion polls reported contradictory results of narrow majorities both for and against the tram.

=== Opposition ===
The scheme was opposed by the local councils of the boroughs along the intended tramway route: Ealing, Hammersmith & Fulham and Hillingdon. Ealing council had initially supported the project, but following a change of council after the local elections, the new ruling Conservative Party council voted against the tramway.

Ealing was also a focus of public campaigning against the tram, where opposition was strongest. A local pressure group, Save Ealing's Streets, launched a campaign in 2004 against the construction of the tramway through Ealing and along the A40 corridor. The group voiced concerns that there were a number of "pinch points" (sections of road not wide enough to accommodate two lanes of traffic and two tram lanes) along the Uxbridge Road which would create major congestion problems and divert a significant amount of traffic through residential areas. They also took the view that the reduction in traffic resulting from the tram would not be as high as that claimed by TfL, citing TfL's own impact studies of Croydon Tramlink. The Croydon system, the group noted, runs mostly on converted railway lines with only a short section of on-street track, and traffic displacement was managed by the construction of a new bypass; the West London Tram, by contrast, would run entirely along a highway which is hemmed in by narrow residential streets, with no scope for additional road construction.

=== 2004/05 consultation ===
The Mayor of London commissioned a public consultation in 2004 to gauge public opinion about the project and make revisions to the plans. 440,000 consultation brochures were circulated and nearly 17,000 questionnaires completed. The results of the exercise, published in March 2005, showed that, while 54% of respondents felt there was need to reduce congestion improve public transport and on the Uxbridge Road, 59 per cent were opposed to the tramway scheme. Opponents expressed concerns about the cost of the project and an anticipated increase in traffic congestion, particularly on residential side roads.

The consultation - the largest ever held by Transport for London - was reportedly dismissed by Mayor Ken Livingstone as "unscientific", who instead cited a separate poll of 1,100 west Londoners which claimed a 54% backing for the tram. Another 2004 poll of 1,800 people, commissioned from ORC by the Greater London Authority, claimed 56% support for the tram.

=== 2006 survey results ===
TfL commissioned market a research programme from Ipsos MORI, who conducted 1,860 telephone interviews with residents of west London during June 2006. The results found that opinion was divided, with 40% supporting the tram scheme while 44% were opposed. A further 14% were impartial. Supporters of the scheme saw the trams as an environmentally friendly and more rapid transport solution than buses, and thought that it would reduce traffic congestion. Opponents mostly expressed the view that the tram line would increase traffic congestion as the roads were not wide enough to accommodate existing traffic and trams, and that traffic would be displaced into side roads, as well as concerns over the disruption caused by tramway construction. While a majority of residents thought that trams were environmentally friendly, a majority believed that trams take up too much space on the road. Most interviewees felt that reducing congestion on the Uxbridge Road was important, an improved bus service was favoured by many.

=== Indefinite postponement ===
The West London Tram project was postponed indefinitely by TfL in August 2007. The decision followed the announcement that central government was to go ahead with the Crossrail project. Opponents of the tramway were critical of the fact that £30 million had already been spent on the project before its cancellation.

TfL have pledged to work with the local boroughs to increase bus provision instead, including interchanges with the future Crossrail stations. TfL have said the tram scheme may be revisited however if further public transport capacity is needed after Crossrail is up and running.

== Alternative proposals ==
Although there was strong opposition to the West London Tram scheme, most subjects expressed the view that congestion on the Uxbridge Road corridor was a major problem and thought that improvements to the existing bus services would be desirable.

Various transport systems have been proposed as an alternative.

- Campaigning group Trolley Buses for West London advocated the introduction of trolleybuses (cabled buses); while such a system would deliver the environmental benefits of electric traction vehicles running on rubber tyres would be quieter, more flexible in congestion, and not entail the maintenance of track nor its laying.
- Alternative thinkers suggest a monorail. For comparison, in 2003, a proposal was considered by Hounslow London Borough Council to construct a 21-kilometre (13 mi) elevated monorail strong-piered above the A4 route from Hammersmith to Heathrow Airport. This was rejected by TfL.
