= Acton, London =

Town in Greater London, England

Coordinates: 51.513519°N 0.270661°W

Acton
- Suburb
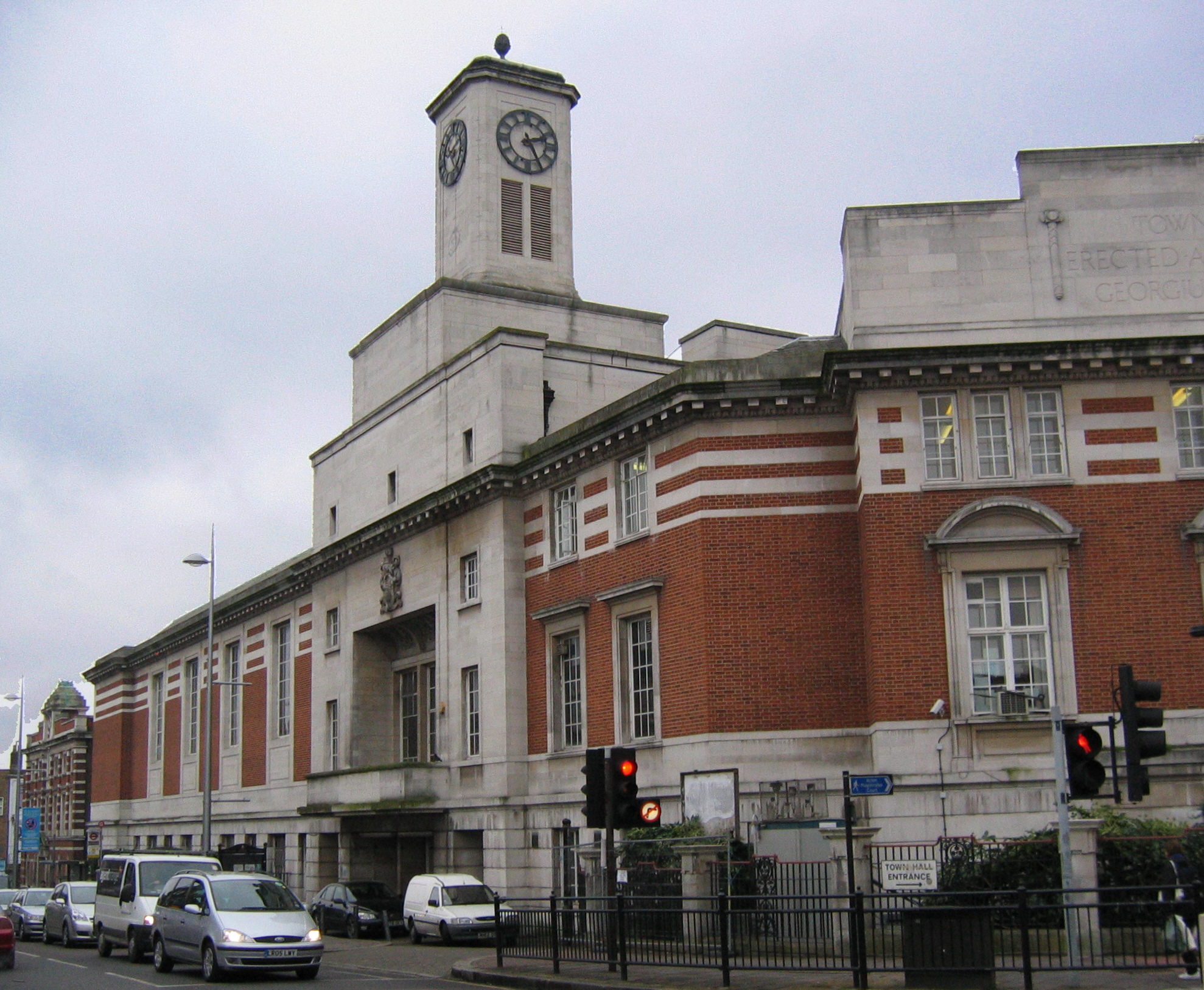
- Acton Town Hall, built for Acton Urban District and opened 10 March 1910

- Location within Greater London
- Area: 9.20 km^{2} (3.55 sq mi)
- Population: 62,480
  - Density: 6,791/km^{2} (17,590/sq mi)
- OS grid reference: TQ205805
  - Charing Cross: 6.1 mi (9.8 km) W
- London borough: Ealing; Hammersmith & Fulham
- Ceremonial county: Greater London
- Region: London
- Country: England
- Sovereign state: United Kingdom
- Post town: LONDON
- Postcode district: W3, W4, W12
- Postcode district: NW10
- Dialling code: 020
- Police: Metropolitan
- Fire: London
- Ambulance: London
- UK Parliament: Ealing Central and Acton
- London Assembly: Ealing and Hillingdon; West Central

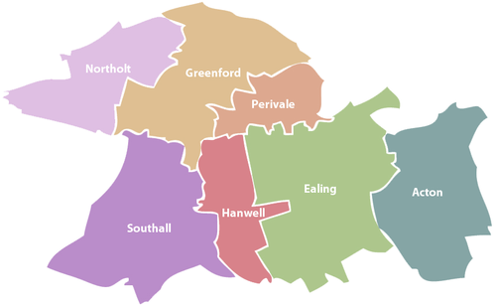
Map of the London Borough of Ealing, showing the location of Acton, one of Ealing's seven major towns.

Acton is a town in West London, England, within the London Borough of Ealing. It is 6.1 miles (10 km) west of Charing Cross.

At the 2011 census, its four wards, East Acton, Acton Central, South Acton and Southfield, had a population of 62,480, a ten-year increase of 8,791 people. North Acton, West Acton, East Acton, South Acton, Acton Green, Acton Town, Acton Vale and Acton Central are all parts of Acton.

Acton means "oak farm" or "farm by oak trees", and is derived from the Old English āc (oak) and tūn (farm). Originally an ancient village, as London expanded, Acton was absorbed into the city. Since 1965, Acton equates to the east of the London Borough of Ealing, though some of East Acton is in the London Borough of Hammersmith and Fulham and a small portion of South Acton is in the London Borough of Hounslow.

Central Acton is synonymous with the hub of commerce and retail on the former main road between London and Oxford (the Uxbridge Road); a reminder of its history is in its inns, which in some cases date back to the late Tudor period as stopping places for travellers. Nowadays, the principal route linking London and Oxford (the A40 dual carriageway) bypasses central Acton, but passes through East Acton and North Acton.

== Toponymy ==
Acton's name derives from the Old English words āc (oak) and tūn (enclosed garden, enclosure), meaning "a garden or a field enclosed by oaks". Later, in the Middle Ages tūn became a synonym for "farm" or "farm by oak trees". For several centuries, its name bore the prefix Church (hence Chirche Acton, Churche Acton, etc.) to distinguish it from the separate hamlet of East Acton.

== History ==
=== Origins ===
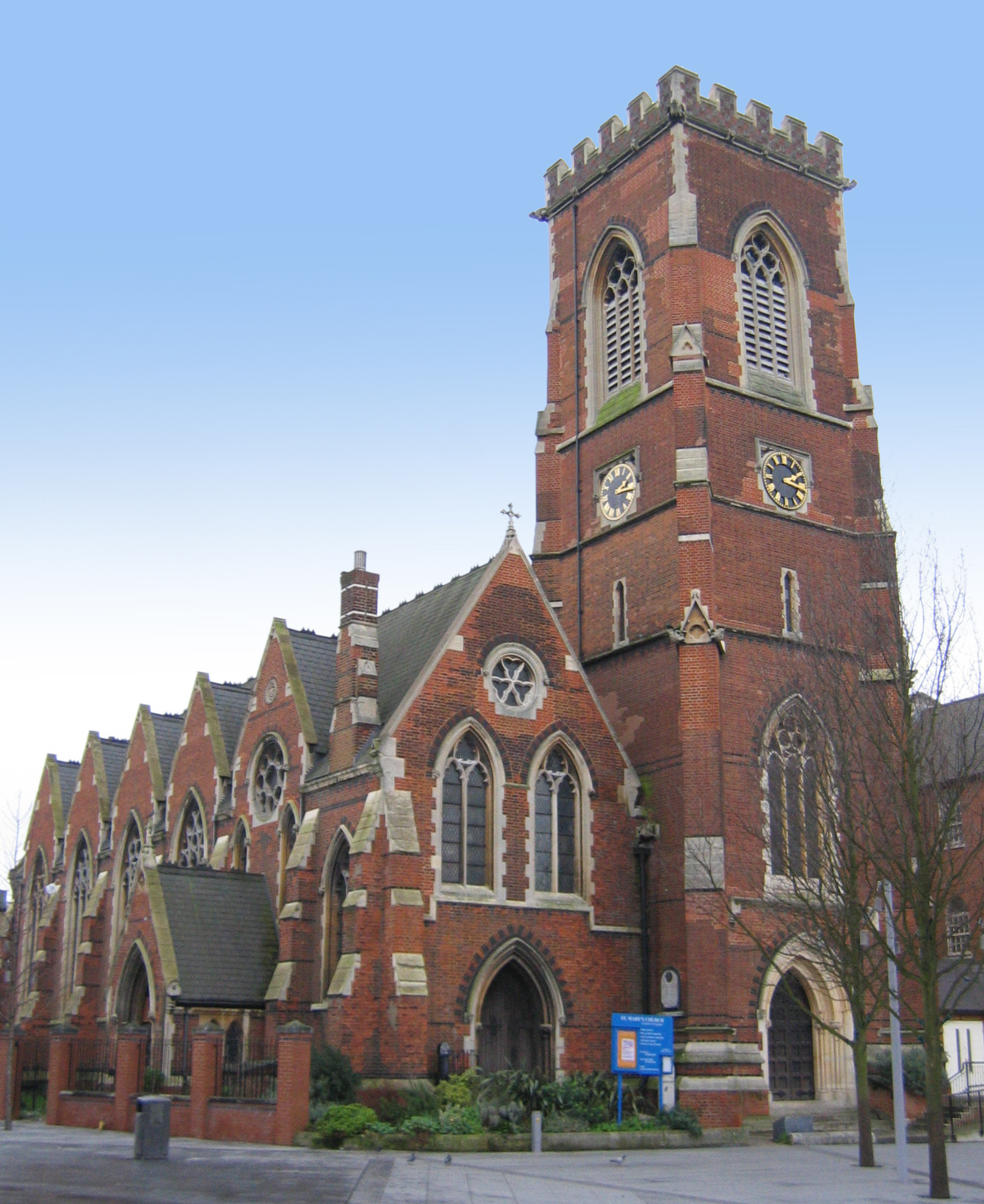
St Mary's Church, King Street, Acton Central

A number of finds indicate prehistoric settlement in Acton. The earliest are a cluster of Upper Palaeolithic and Mesolithic flint cores, flakes and artefacts found mainly to the north of Churchfield Road. Around the Mill Hill Park area, a Neolithic axe, and a group of Bronze Age Deverel-Rimbury urns and cremated bone were found, along with an Iron Age pot shard. Iron Age coins were also found near Bollo Lane. The Roman period is represented by a ditch in the same area, and a hoard north of Springfield Gardens. In the Middle Ages the northern half of the parish was heavily wooded. Oaks and elms still stood along roads and hedgerows and in private grounds in the early 20th century, but most of the woodland had been cleared by the 17th century, even on the extensive Old Oak common.

=== Medieval era ===
Landholders figuring in county records were resident by 1222 and houses were recorded from the late 13th century. The main settlement, Church Acton or Acton town, lay slightly west of the centre of the parish along the highway to Oxford (Uxbridge Road) at the 5-mile post out of London. By 1380 some of the tenements, such as The Tabard and The Cock, along the south side of the road, were inns. The hamlet of East Acton, mentioned in 1294, consisted of farmhouses and cottages north and south of common land known as East Acton green by 1474.

Medieval settlement was mainly around the two hamlets. At Church Acton most of the farmhouses lay along the Oxford road or Horn Lane, with only a few outlying farms. Friars Place Farm at the north end of Horn Lane and the moated site to the west, occupied until the 15th century, were early farms. East of Friars Place farm were commons: Worton or Watton Green and Rush green in the 16th and 17th centuries, and Friars Place in the 18th century, where there was some settlement by 1664. To the north-west were Acton or Old Oak wells, known by 1613. In the parish's extreme south, a few farmhouses on the northern side of Acton common or Acton Green were mentioned as in Turnham Green until the 19th century and were linked more closely with that village than with Acton. Gregories, mentioned in 1551 as a copyhold tenement with 30 a. near Bollo Lane and the Brentford high road, probably lay in Acton.

Londoners were increasingly involved in land sales from the early 14th century but apparently did not live in Acton until the late 15th. The manor, part of Fulham, had no resident (demesne) lord, and apart from a brief period before c. 1735, when a branch of the landed Somerset (Duke of Beaufort's) family lived in Acton, there were no large resident landowners. Many of the tenements without land, including most of the inns, frequently changed hands.

=== Early modern period ===
The parish had 158 communicants in 1548. In 1664 it had 72 chargeable households and 59 exempt, with 6 empty houses. Six houses had 10 or more hearths, 16 had from 5 to 9, 33 had 3 or 4, 23 had 2, and 53 had 1. Acton had about 160 families resident in the mid 18th century.

By the 17th century Acton's proximity to London had made it a summer retreat for courtiers and lawyers. Sir Richard Sutton bought the seat at East Acton known later as Manor House in 1610 and Sir Henry Garraway probably rebuilt Acton House in 1638. Sir John Trevor MP bought several Acton properties in the mid 17th century, including Berrymead/Berrymede, improving it with a lake and stream, home of George Savile, 1st Marquess of Halifax and his second son after him, and afterwards of the Duke of Kingston-upon-Hull, with a much-praised landscape.

Acton was lauded as "blessed with very sweet air" in 1706 by rector urging a friend in verse to move there. The fashion for medicinal waters brought a brief period of fame, with the exploitation of the wells at Old Oak common, when East Acton and Friars Place were said to be thronged with summer visitors, who had brought about improvement in the houses there. Although high society had left Acton by the mid 18th century, many professional and military men bought houses there, sometimes including a small park, until well into the 19th century. The break-up of the 800 acres (3.2 km^{2}) Fetherstonhaugh estate, which had had no resident owner, produced four or five small estates whose owners, professional men such as Samuel Wegg, John Winter, and Richard White, were active in parish affairs. Grand early homes included: Heathfield Lodge, West Lodge, and East Lodge by Winter c. 1800, Mill Hill House by White, and Woodlands at Acton Hill soon afterwards. Acton Green also became increasingly popular, being near Chiswick High Road (the Great West Road). Fairlawn, substantial, on west side of the green, was the home of the botanist John Lindley (1797–1865) as was the house to the north and Bedford House, another home of Lindley, and Melbourne House further east. A short row of houses had been built on the south side of the green by 1800.

In 1804, Derwentwater House was built in the grounds of Acton House by the Selby family.

=== 19th century development ===
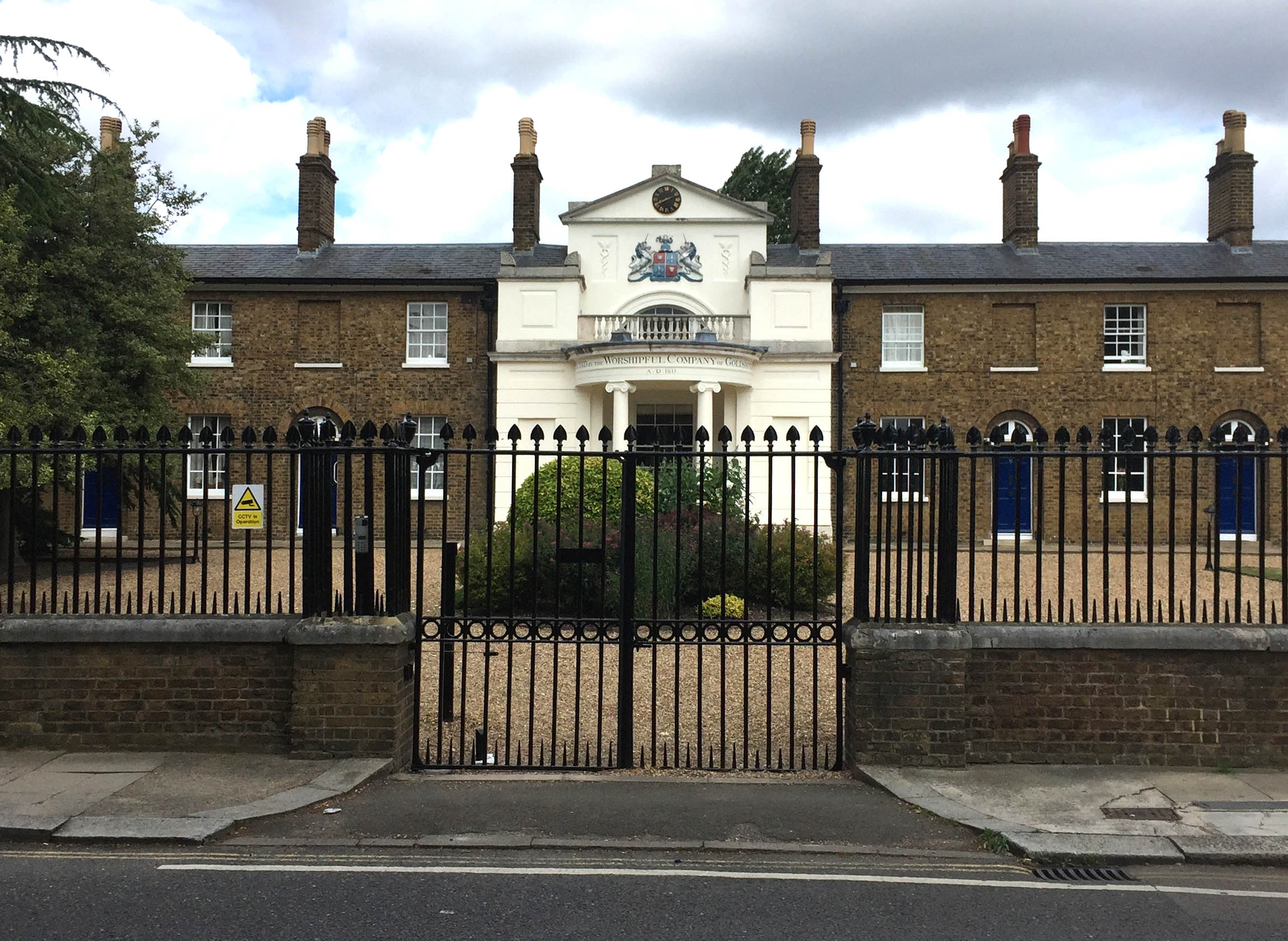
Worshipful Company of Goldsmiths' Alms Houses, Acton, 1812.

In 1812, twenty almshouses were built by the Worshipful Company of Goldsmiths on the former Perryn estate, on land which had been left to the company by John Perryn in 1657.

There were 241 inhabited houses in 1801 and 426 by 1831. Growth took place mainly in the established residential neighbourhoods of Acton town and East Acton, but Acton Green also had acquired a cluster of cottages and houses at the bottom of Acton Lane by 1842. Acton was mostly rural in 1831. The few mansions contrasted sharply with most of the houses, which were described as 'beneath mediocrity of character'. Despite an overall rise in the number of houses, poor rates had to be increased in the 1820s because of a growing number of empty dwellings.

More widespread building was planned and took place in the 1850s. As a result of its soft water sources, Acton became famous for its laundries and at the end of the 19th century there were around 170 establishments in South Acton. These laundries would serve hotels and the rich in London's West End, leading to the nickname "Soapsuds Island" or "Soap Sud City". At least 600 different laundries operated within South Acton, the last laundry closed in the late 1970s and is now a low redbrick block of flats.

The parish of Acton formed a local board of health in 1865 and became an urban district in 1894.

In 1895, Acton Cemetery was opened on farmland near to what is now North Acton Station.

=== 20th century ===
The town was incorporated as the Municipal Borough of Acton in 1921. This authority combined with the municipal boroughs of Ealing and Southall to form the London Borough of Ealing, within Greater London, in 1965. An Acton Golf Club was founded in 1896, which closed in 1920 and the area was redeveloped for housing.

Acton formed an urban district and, later, municipal borough of Middlesex from 1894 to 1965. Its former area was used to form part of the London Borough of Ealing in 1965. The industries of North Acton merged with the great industrial concentrations of Park Royal and Harlesden. During the 20th century Acton was a major industrial centre employing tens of thousands of people, particularly in the motor vehicles and components industries. These included car manufacturer Renault, that built the 4CV and Dauphine, at a factory in North Acton from 1926 until 1960. Renault has remained on the site continuously since the 1920s and still has its main London showroom on the Park Royal site. Alfred Mond built a nickel carbonyl refinery here that was able to produce platinum as a by-product of the matte from Inco's Sudbury Basin operations.

Further south Acton Vale had manufacturers including Napier & Son (engines), H. Bronnley & Co (Soaps), Evershed & Vignoles (electrical equipment), Lucas CAV (automotive electrical), Vandervell Products (bearings), and Wilkinson Sword (swords and razors).

== Acton today ==
Acton is now principally residential, with some light industry, particularly in the northeast Park Royal area, and the south near the border with Chiswick. Waitrose was founded on Acton High Street near the police station, as Waite, Rose and Taylor, with its second shop opening in Churchfield Road in 1913.

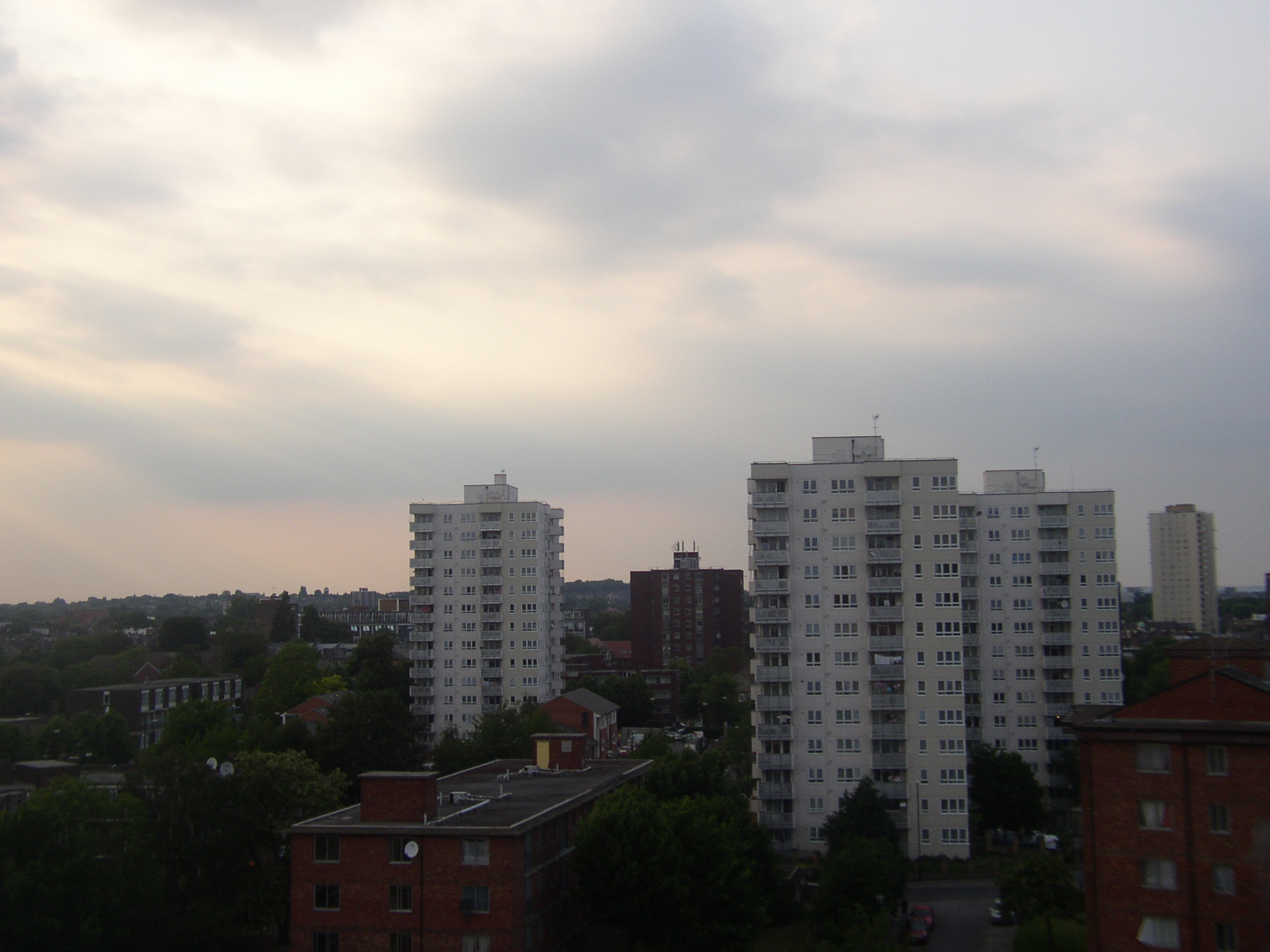
The South Acton estate

Acton has the largest housing estate in west London, the South Acton estate, with approximately 2,000 homes and 5,800 residents.

This area is currently in the Phase 2 of a major 15-year phased regeneration which includes near-total demolition of the existing residential units, and the construction of new and more numerous residential units. Since World War II, Acton has had a small but notable population of Polish immigrants. In recent years, a number of Antipodean immigrants have settled there; there are several Australian and South African pubs concentrated in a small area. The Japanese School in London has also attracted a Japanese community to West Acton. East Acton's King Fahd Academy also attracted Arab and mainly Saudi immigrants to the area. The Somali community is concentrated around Church Road, and there are two mosques near the High Street. The Irish community has diminished somewhat in recent years, but there are still a number of Irish pubs in the area.

Acton has the starting point of the 25 kilometre Thames Tideway Tunnel (also known as the "Super Sewer") at the Acton Storm Tanks in Canham Road. This will be built to avoid the discharge of sewage from Combined Sewer Overflow into the River Thames.

== Leisure ==
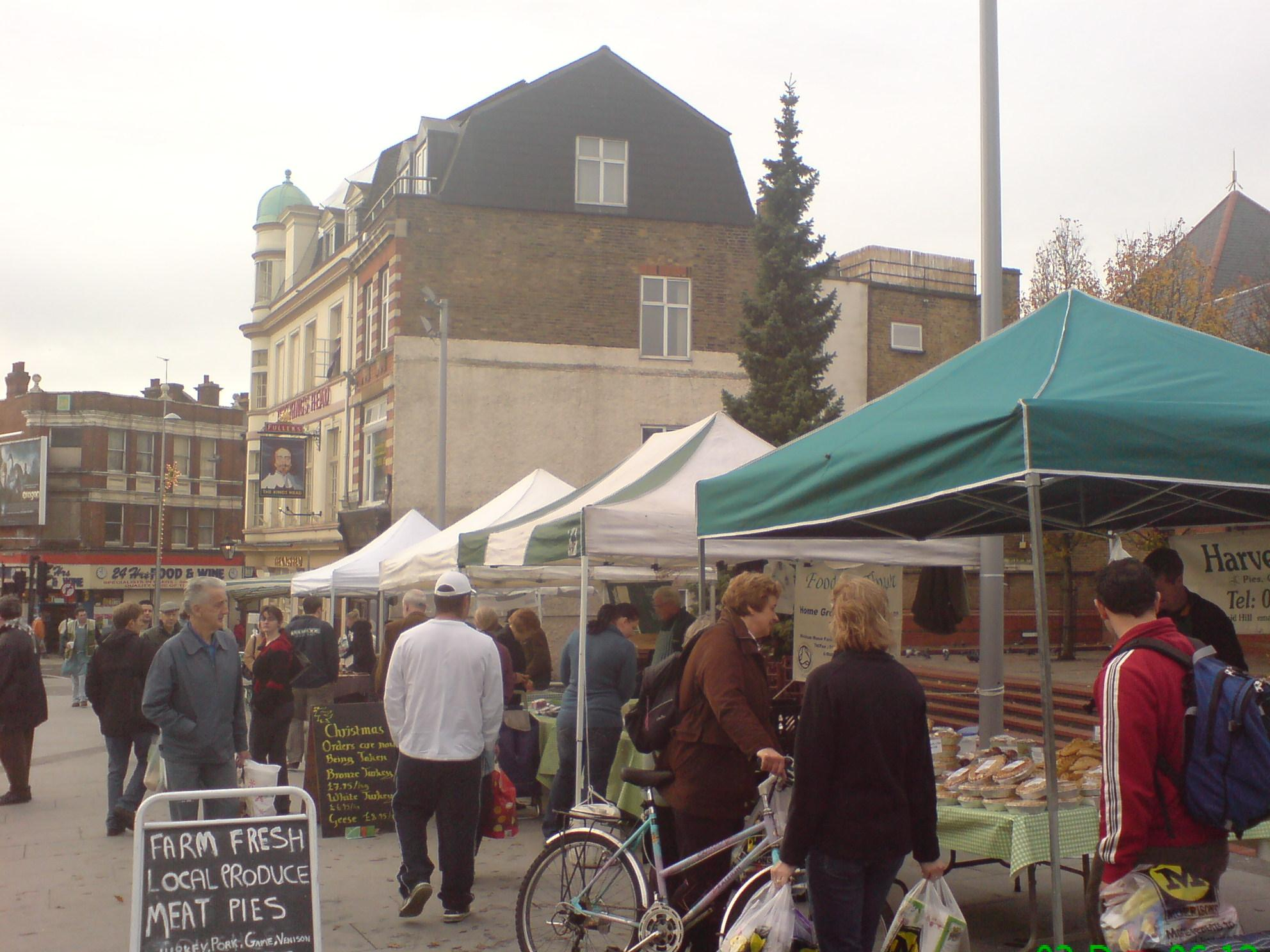
Pilot of Acton Farmers' Market, December 2006

The Mount on Acton High Street hosts a market on Thursday, Friday and Saturday. Visitors can shop at stalls selling a range of produce. Acton's library, swimming baths (built in 1904) and Town Hall are examples of tall Victorian municipal buildings that can be found along the High Street. The Swimming Baths closed in December 2011 for a three-year development project, replacing the existing pools with a 25m 8-lane pool and a smaller teaching pool. The site reopened in April 2014. An indoor climbing wall opened on the high street, housed in a building constructed in the 1920s as an Art Deco cinema. The building was later used as a bingo hall before being refurbished into a bouldering centre.

On the east end of Acton High Street is Acton Park, which features mini golf, bar and pizza restaurant operated by Putt in the Park. The southeastern bcorner of the park includes tennis courts, outdoor fitness equipment and a multi-purpose basketball and 5-a-side football court. The park also features a large children's play area including, an adventure playground partially created from local trees felled during a storm, a pond, an art block and a skate park, run by the Ealing Skatepark Association, which opened in April 2019.

== Education ==
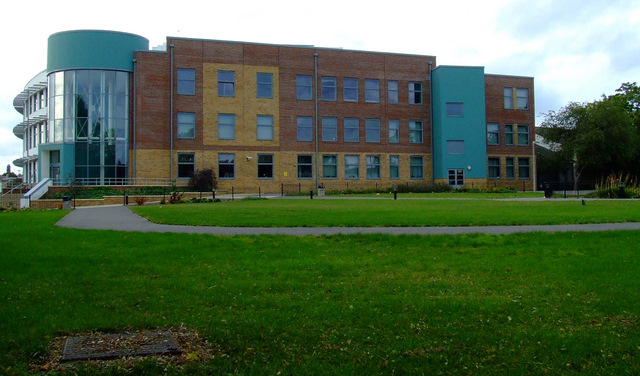
Acton High School, 2008

=== Primary schools ===
There are six state-funded primary schools in Acton, Berrymede Junior School, Derwentwater Primary School, East Acton Primary School, St Vincent's RC Primary School, West Acton Primary School, West Twyford Primary School. The Ark (charity) has opened two primary academies in Acton, Ark Priory Primary Academy in 2013 and Ark Byron Primary Academy in 2015, the latter is based in Acton Park.

=== Secondary schools ===
Acton has three state-funded secondary high schools, Ark Acton Academy (formerly Acton High School), Twyford Church of England High School and The Ellen Wilkinson School for Girls. Acton was once home to another independent school, Haberdashers' Aske's School for Girls before it changed its site to Elstree, the Acton site becoming the Cardinal Newman Roman Catholic High School.

=== International schools ===
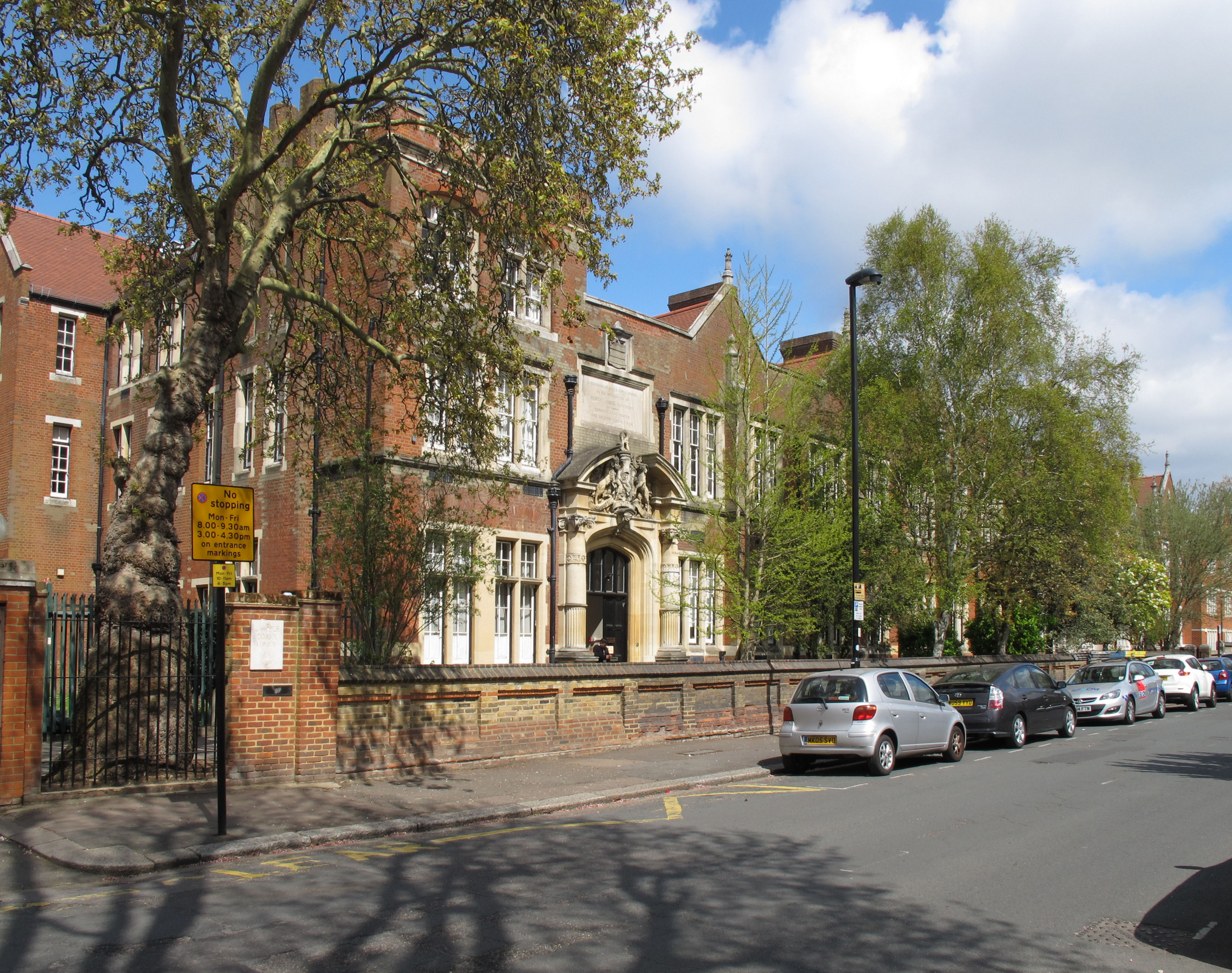
Japanese School in London

The Japanese School in London is in Acton.

== Acton in popular culture ==
- Leo Sayer's 1983 single Orchard Road refers to Acton's Churchfield Road.
- In the TV series Minder, Arthur Daley's car lot was by the railway bridge in The Vale with the door of the Winchester Club in Newburgh Road off Churchfield Road. The lock up was on the Bush Industrial Estate. Minder locations in Acton featured throughout series 7 to 10.
- The first Waitrose store in the UK was in Acton. Originally called "Waite, Rose and Taylor", it opened in 1904, at number 263 Acton Hill. A metal plate commemorating this has been inserted into the pavement outside these premises as it was not possible to obtain permission from the current owners of the building to affix a plaque onto it.
- The TV series Motherland used locations in Acton and Chiswick including Southfield Primary School, Southfield Park (episode 'Good Job' Series 2) and Acton Park ('Christmas Special' 2020).

== Notable people ==
- Jamal Edwards, founder of the British music media and creative cultural industries platform SB.TV grew up on the Friary Park estate in North Acton.
- Mathangi Arulpragasam, rapper and activist, known by her stage name M.I.A. (acronymous for Missing in Acton), grew up in the town, which is referenced numerous times in her lyrics.
- Peter Ackroyd, writer, grew up in East Acton
- Henry Charles Brewer (1866–1950), early 20th century artist, lived on Perryn Road, Acton until his death, and is buried in Acton Cemetery.
- James Alphege Brewer (1881–1946), creator of etchings, lived on Avenue Road, and is buried in Acton Cemetery.
- Karl Dallas, music journalist and peace campaigner, was born and lived in Acton
- John Entwistle, musician, was brought up and went to school in Acton
- Adam Faith, singer, actor and financial journalist was born and grew up in Acton.
- Emilia Fox, actor, lived in Acton in 2016.
- Kit Harington, actor, was born in Acton
- Simon Reeve, TV presenter, grew up in Acton.
- Hannah Reid, lead singer of London Grammar grew up in Acton
- Alan Rickman, actor, lived in Acton
- Mark Smith, bodybuilder and actor, who starred as 'Rhino' in Gladiators
- Pete Townshend, musician, grew up and attended school in Acton
- Alan Wilder, former member of the band Depeche Mode was born and raised in Acton
- Robin Friday, former footballer, was born and lived in Acton.
- Robert Spall, recipient of the Victoria Cross was born in Spencer Road, Acton.
- Asma al-Assad, former First Lady of Syria, grew up in Acton.
- Fawaz Akhras, Syrian-English Cardiologist, chairman of the British Syrian Society, and father of Asma al-Assad.

== Transport ==
=== Tube/Rail ===
Stations in the area are:

- Acton Central railway station (Mildmay line)
- Acton Main Line railway station (Elizabeth line)
- Acton Town Underground station (District line and Piccadilly line)
- East Acton Underground station (Central line)
- North Acton Underground station (Central line)
- South Acton railway station (Mildmay line)
- West Acton Underground station [Central line (Ealing Broadway branch)]

Acton has seven railway stations bearing its name, more than any other place in the United Kingdom other than London itself. Acton is also the only place in London to have stations named after all four of its cardinal points, north, south, east, and west. The widespread provision of train services reflects a long railway history, particularly associated (historically) with London Transport and the Great Western Railway. Between 1858 and 1864 there was a further station on the North London Railway, Acton Junction, where the line to Hammersmith & Chiswick railway station branched off.

North Acton has a large Great Western Railway housing estate (now privately owned), and the Old Oak Common TMD railway depot is within the usual boundary, as is the London Transport Museum Depot which houses an extensive collection of historic and heritage rolling stock. Acton Main Line station has a busy freight yard (operating ballast and container trains).

=== Buses operating in Acton ===
London Buses routes 7, 70, 72, 94, 95, 207, 218, 228, 260, 266, 272, 306, 440, 487, E3, N7, N11, N207 and SL8 serve Acton.

=== Shelved tram proposals ===
Transport for London, led by then Mayor of London, Ken Livingstone, proposed to build a West London Tram between Shepherd's Bush and Uxbridge town centre. It would have run along the A4020, the Uxbridge Road, through Acton, Ealing, West Ealing, Hanwell, Southall and Hayes End. This proposed scheme was highly controversial and resulted in strong differences in opinion between TfL, who supported the scheme, and local councils throughout the proposed route, who all took a 'no tram' stance.

The West London Tram was finally scrapped when former Prime Minister Gordon Brown agreed that the long-awaited Crossrail would go ahead in October 2007. Acton Main Line railway station is now a station on the Elizabeth line, delivered by the Crossrail project, with 4 trains per hour in each direction.

== Bordering towns ==
- Chiswick
- Ealing
- Harlesden
- Park Royal
- Shepherd's Bush
- North Acton
- South Acton
- East Acton
- West Acton
- Bedford Park
- South Ealing

== Gallery ==
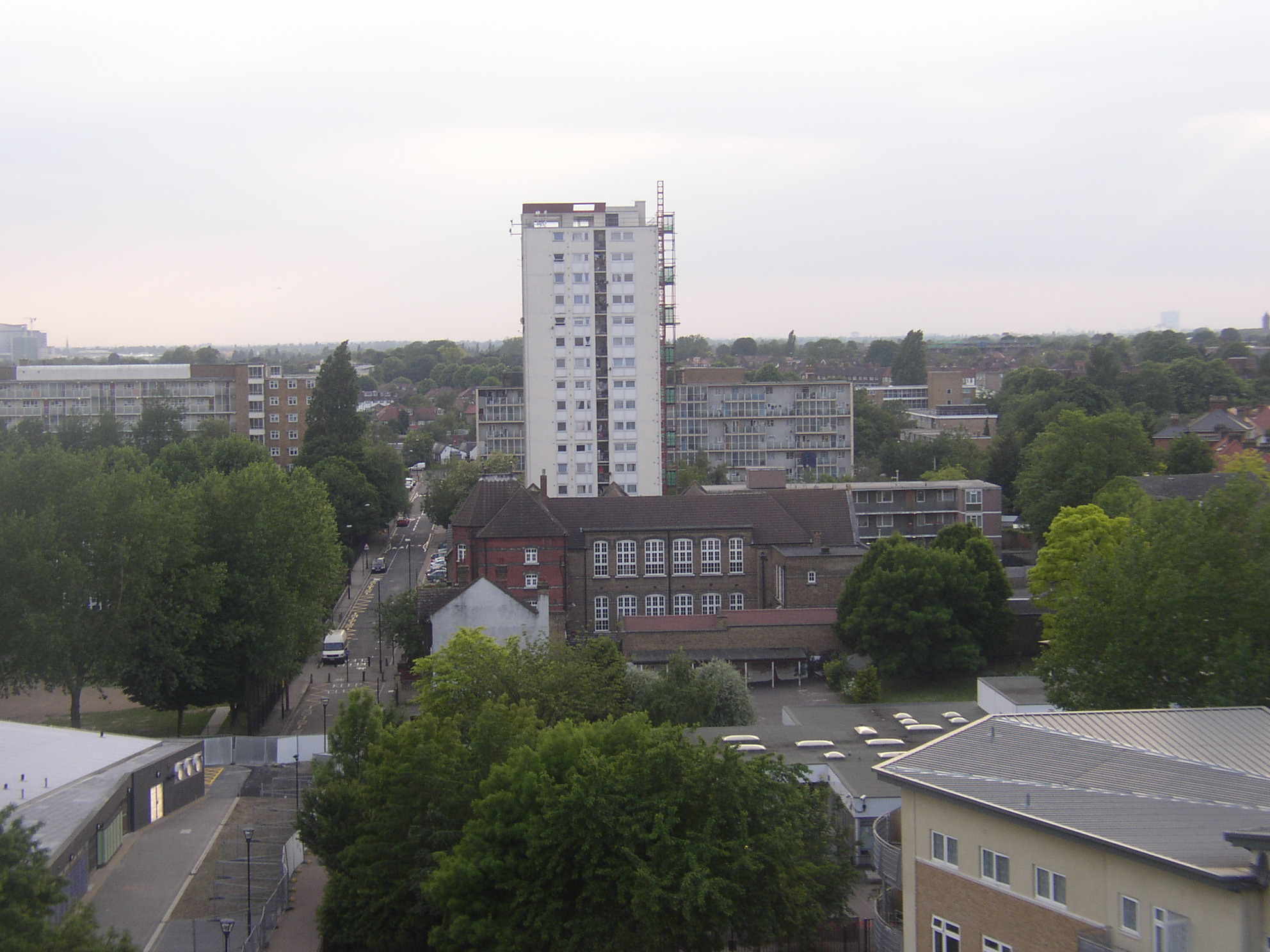
View of South Acton from Barwick House, showing Jerome Tower and Berrymede Junior School

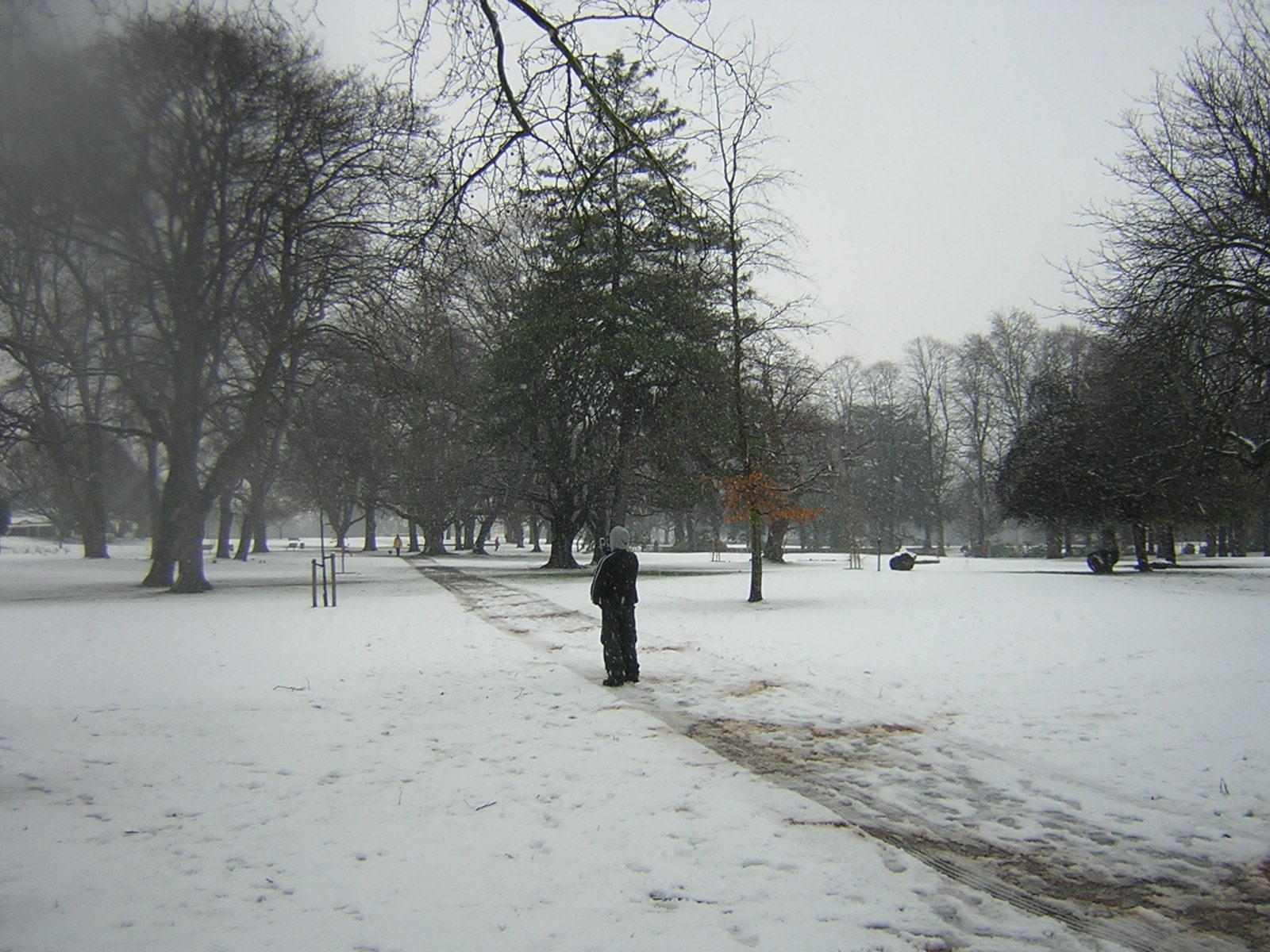
Acton Park

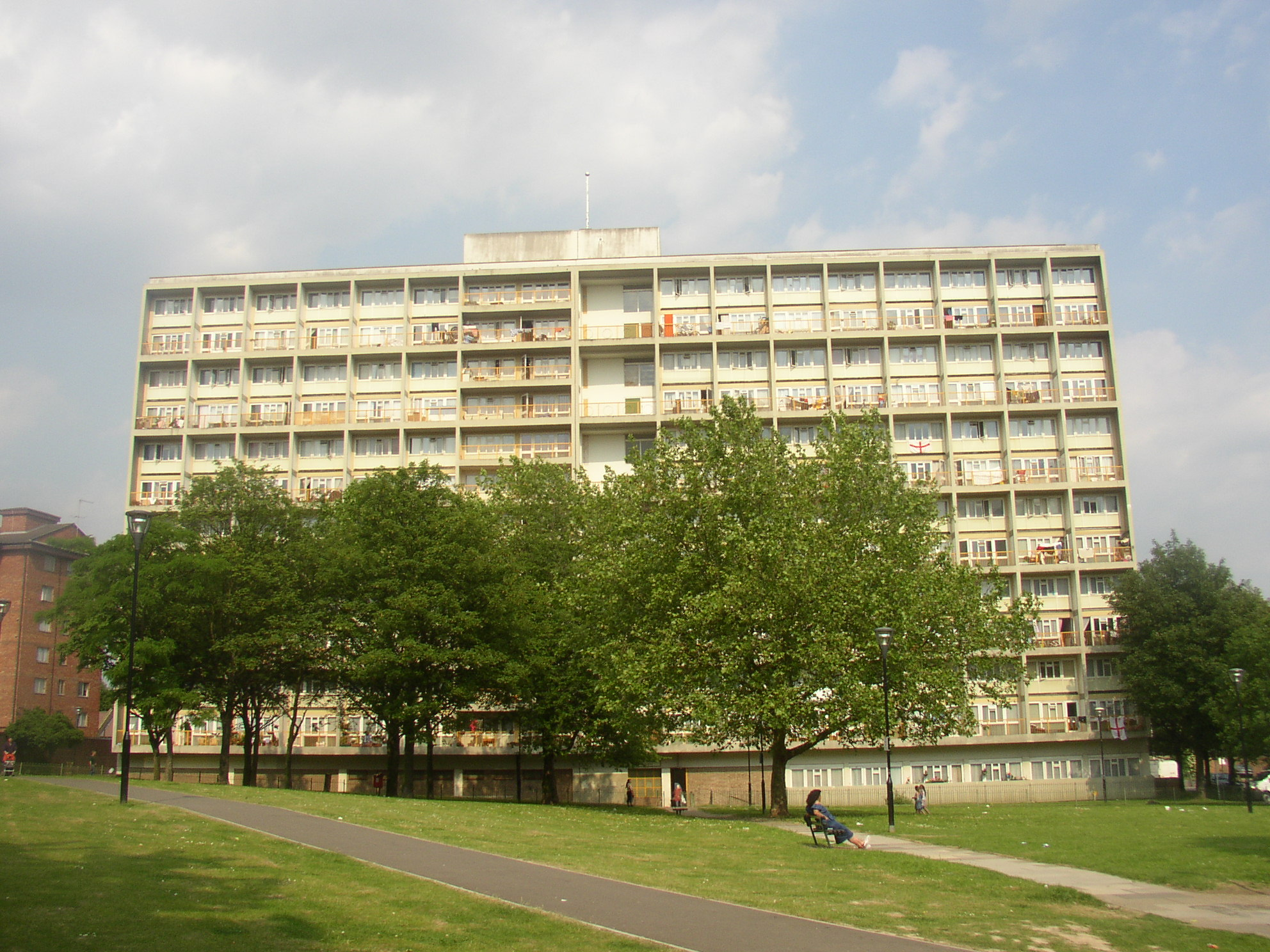
Barwick House, on the South Acton estate

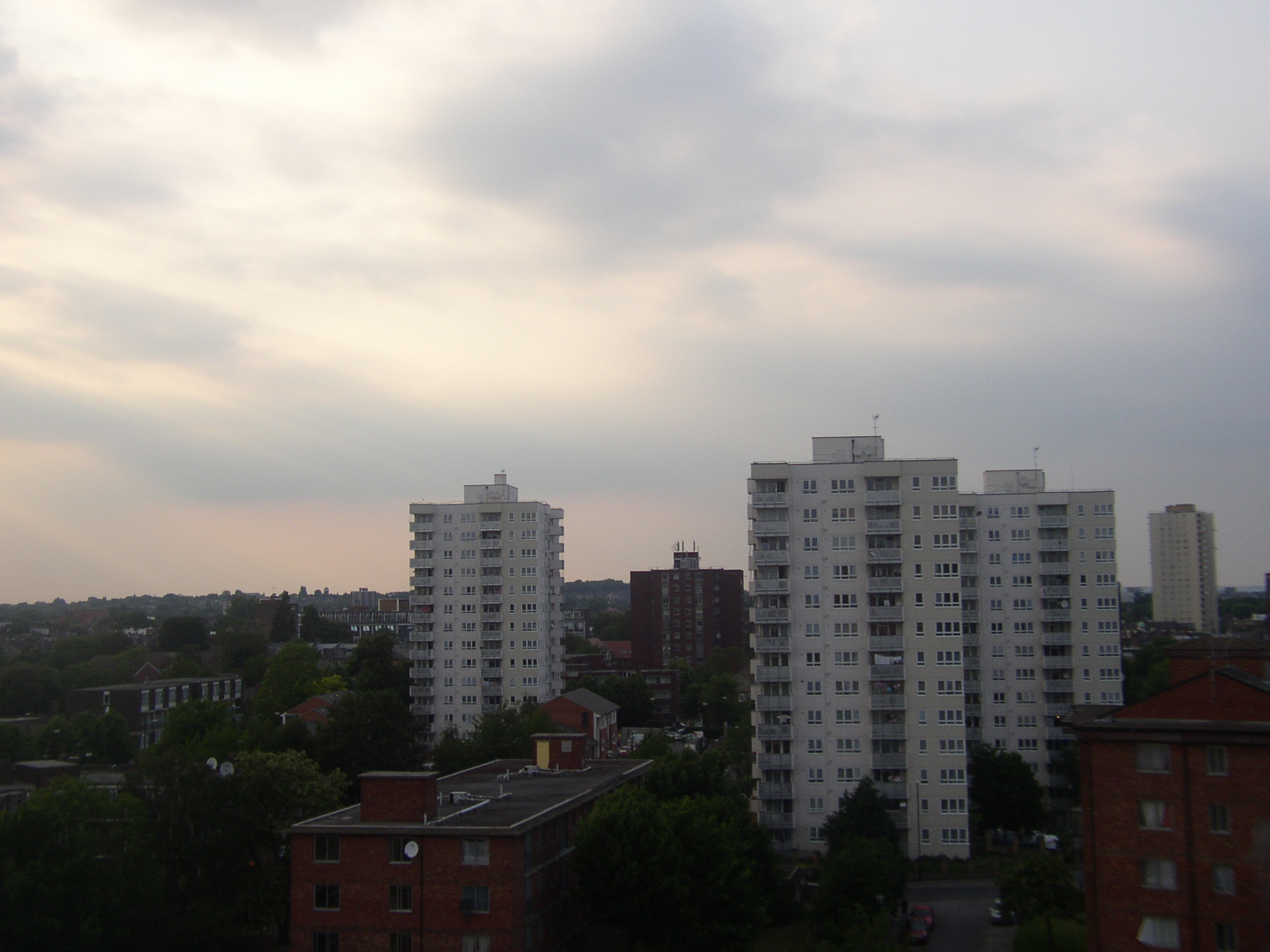
Blocks of flats on the South Acton estate

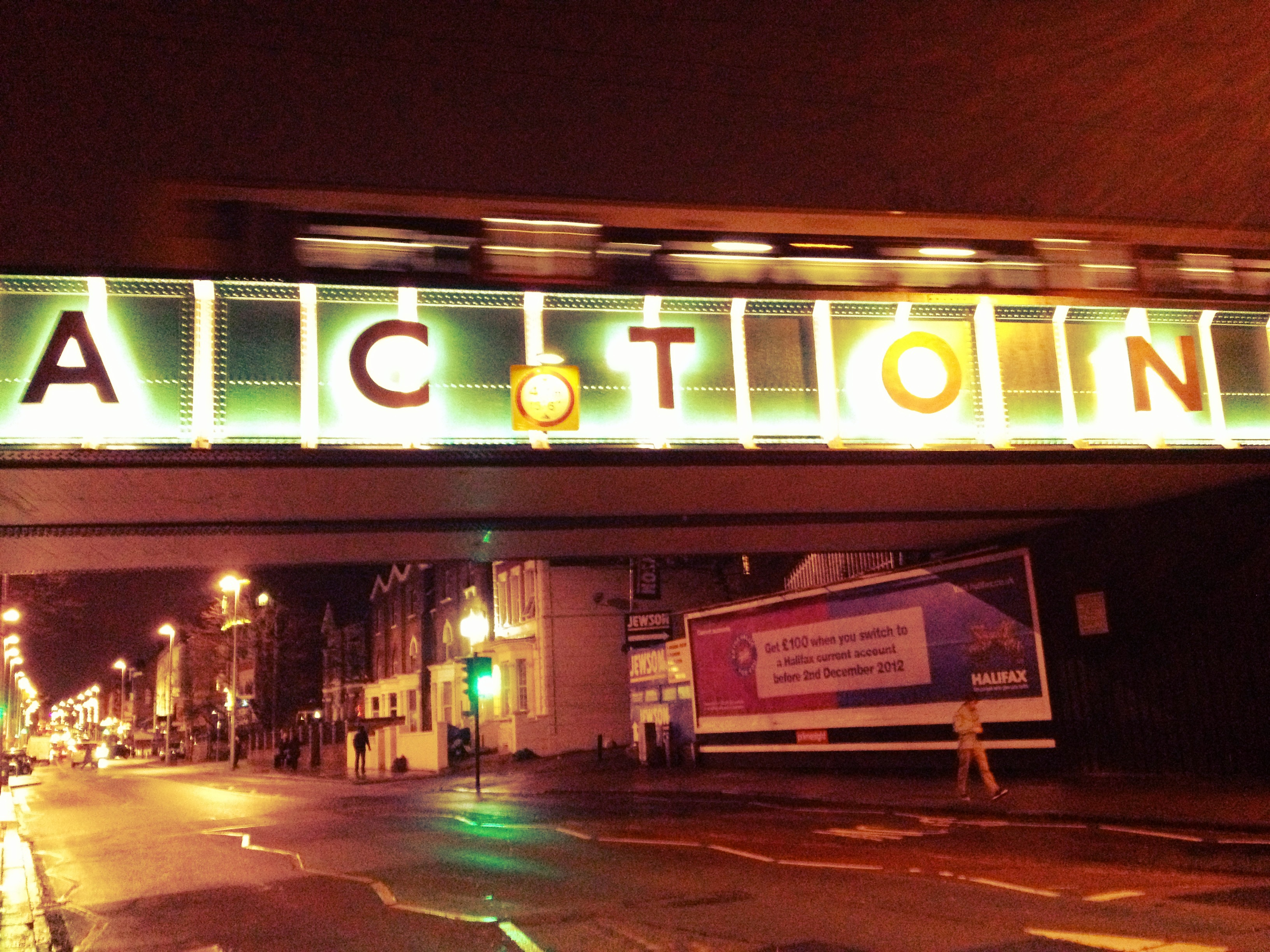
Nighttime view of Acton sign on the railway bridge at the bottom of Acton High Street in London.

== See also ==
- Murder of Jean Bradley – in Acton in 1993
