= Acton Vale, London =

Coordinates: 51.511°N 0.258°W

Acton Vale
- Suburb
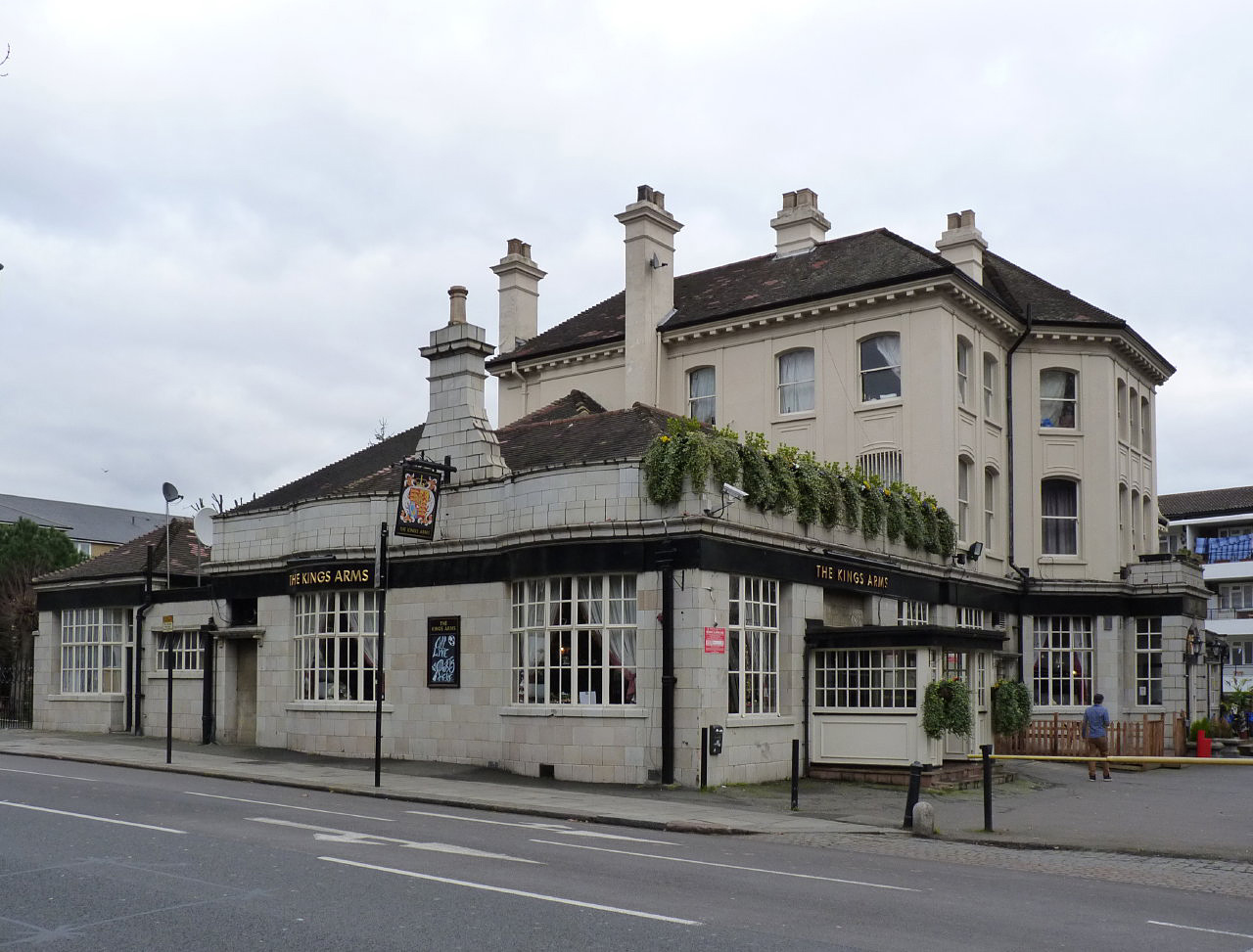
- The Kings Arms, Acton Vale

- Location within Greater London
- OS grid reference: TQ205805
- London borough: Ealing
- Ceremonial county: Greater London
- Region: London
- Country: England
- Sovereign state: United Kingdom
- Post town: LONDON
- Postcode district: W3
- Dialling code: 020
- Police: Metropolitan
- Fire: London
- Ambulance: London
- UK Parliament: Ealing Central and Acton
- London Assembly: Ealing and Hillingdon

Acton Vale is a district in London, England. It lies between Acton to the west, and Shepherd's Bush to the east.

In 1897, it referred to the stretch of the Uxbridge Road between Acton High Street (starting at the railway bridge) and Askew Road. In 1908, it referred to the stretch of the Uxbridge Road between Acton High Street (starting at the railway bridge) and Larden Road
