= List of schools in the London Borough of Hillingdon =

This is a list of schools in the London Borough of Hillingdon, England.

== State-funded schools ==
=== Primary schools ===
Source.

- Belmore Primary Academy, Hayes
- Bishop Winnington-Ingram CE Primary School, Ruislip
- Botwell House RC Primary School, Hayes
- Bourne Primary School, Ruislip
- The Breakspear School, Ickenham
- Brookside Primary School, Hayes
- Charville Academy, Hayes
- Cherry Lane Primary School, West Drayton
- Colham Manor Primary School, Hillingdon
- Coteford Infant School, Pinner
- Coteford Junior School, Pinner
- Cowley St Laurence CE Primary School, Cowley
- Cranford Park Academy, Harlington
- Deanesfield Primary School, South Ruislip
- Dr Tripletts CE Primary School, Hayes
- Field End Infant School, Ruislip
- Field End Junior School, Ruislip
- Frithwood Primary School, Northwood
- Glebe Primary School, Ickenham
- Grange Park Infant School, Hayes
- Grange Park Junior School, Hayes
- Guru Nanak Sikh Academy, Hayes
- Harefield Infant School, Harefield
- Harefield Junior School, Harefield
- Harlyn Primary School, Pinner
- Harmondsworth Primary School, Harmondsworth
- Hayes Park School, Hayes
- Heathrow Primary School, Sipson
- Hermitage Primary School, Uxbridge
- Hewens Primary School, Hayes
- Highfield Primary School, Hillingdon
- Hillingdon Primary School, Hillingdon
- Hillside Infant School, Northwood
- Hillside Junior School, Northwood
- Holy Trinity CE School, Northwood
- John Locke Academy, Uxbridge
- Lake Farm Park Academy, Hayes
- Lady Bankes Primary School, Ruislip
- Laurel Lane Primary School, West Drayton
- Minet Infants School, Hayes
- Minet Junior School, Hayes
- Nanaksar Primary School, Hillingdon
- Newnham Infant School, Ruislip
- Newnham Junior School, Ruislip
- Oak Farm Primary School, Hillingdon
- Pinkwell Primary School, Hayes
- Rabbsfarm Primary School, Yiewsley
- Rosedale Primary School, Hayes
- Ruislip Gardens Primary School, Ruislip
- Ryefield Primary School, Hillingdon
- Sacred Heart RC Primary School, Ruislip
- St Andrew's CE Primary School, Uxbridge
- St Bernadette Catholic Primary School, Hillingdon
- St Catherine RC Primary School, West Drayton
- St Martin's CE Primary School, West Drayton
- St Mary's RC Primary School, Uxbridge
- St Matthew's CE Primary School, Yiewsley
- St Swithun Wells RC Primary School, Ruislip
- Warrender Primary School, Ruislip
- West Drayton Academy, West Drayton
- Whitehall Infant School, Uxbridge
- Whitehall Junior School, Uxbridge
- Whiteheath Infant School, Ruislip
- Whiteheath Junior School, Ruislip
- William Byrd Primary Academy, Harlington
- Wood End Park Academy, Hayes
- Yeading Infant School, Hayes
- Yeading Junior School, Hayes

=== Secondary schools ===
- Barnhill Community High School, Hayes
- Bishop Ramsey CE School, Ruislip
- Bishopshalt School, Hillingdon
- De Salis Studio College, Hayes
- The Douay Martyrs Catholic Secondary School, Ickenham
- Global Academy, Hayes
- Guru Nanak Sikh Academy, Hayes
- Harefield Academy, Harefield
- Harlington School, Hayes
- Haydon School, Northwood
- Hewens College, Hayes End
- Northwood School, Northwood
- Oak Wood School, Uxbridge
- Park Academy West London, Hillingdon
- Parkside Studio College, Hayes
- Queensmead School, South Ruislip
- Rosedale College, Hayes
- Ruislip High School, Ruislip Manor
- Swakeleys School for Girls, Hillingdon
- UTC Heathrow, Northwood
- Uxbridge High School, Uxbridge
- Vyners School, Ickenham

=== Special and alternative schools ===
- Grangewood School, Eastcote
- Hedgewood School, Hayes
- Meadow High School, Hillingdon
- Moorcroft School, Hillingdon
- Pentland Field School, Ickenham
- RNIB Sunshine House School, Northwood
- The Pride Academy, Yiewsley
- The Skills Hub, Yiewsley
- The Willows School, Hayes

=== Further education ===
- Uxbridge College, Uxbridge and Hayes

== Independent schools ==
=== Primary and preparatory schools ===
- The Hall School, Northwood
- St Helen's College, Hillingdon
- St John's School, Northwood
- St Martin's School, Northwood

=== Senior and all-through schools ===
- ACS Hillingdon, Hillingdon
- Lady Nafisa School, West Drayton
- Northwood College, Northwood
- St Helen's School, Northwood

=== Special and alternative schools ===
- Hillingdon Manor School, Hillingdon
- Pield Heath House RC School, Uxbridge
