= Sun Odyssey 379 =

Sailboat class

Development
- Designer: Marc Lombard
- Location: France
- Year: 2011
- Builder: Jeanneau
- Role: Cruiser
- Name: Sun Odyssey 379

Boat
- Displacement: 14,771 lb (6,700 kg)
- Draft: 6.36 ft (1.94 m)

Hull
- Type: monohull
- Construction: fiberglass
- LOA: 37.20 ft (11.34 m)
- LWL: 34.12 ft (10.40 m)
- Beam: 12.34 ft (3.76 m)
- Engine: Yanmar 29 hp (22 kW) diesel engine

Hull appendages
- Keel: fin keel with weighted bulb
- Ballast: 3,913 lb (1,775 kg)
- Rudder: internally-mounted spade-type rudder

Rig
- Rig type: Bermuda rig
- I foretriangle height: 46.70 ft (14.23 m)
- J foretriangle base: 13.60 ft (4.15 m)
- P mainsail luff: 44.60 ft (13.59 m)
- E mainsail foot: 13.90 ft (4.24 m)

Sails
- Sailplan: 9/10 fractional rigged sloop
- Mainsail area: 377 sq ft (35.0 m^{2})
- Jib/genoa area: 251 sq ft (23.3 m^{2})
- Spinnaker area: 1,066 sq ft (99.0 m^{2})
- Gennaker area: 973 sq ft (90.4 m^{2})
- Other sails: genoa: 377 sq ft (35.0 m^{2}); Code 0: 594 sq ft (55.2 m^{2})
- Upwind sail area: 753 sq ft (70.0 m^{2})
- Downwind sail area: 1,442 sq ft (134.0 m^{2})

Racing
- PHRF: 102-111

The Sun Odyssey 379 is a French sailboat that was designed by Marc Lombard as a cruiser and first built in 2011.

The design was named the 2012 Domestic Boat of the Year and Best Midsize Cruiser by Cruising World magazine.

The design was developed into the Sun Odyssey 389 in 2015.

== Production ==
The design was built by Jeanneau in France, from 2011 until 2015, but it is now out of production.

== Design ==
The Sun Odyssey 379 is a recreational keelboat, built predominantly of polyester fiberglass, with wood trim. The hull is made from solid handlaid fiberglass, while the deck is injection-molded and cored with balsa. It has a 9/10 fractional sloop rig, with a deck-stepped mast, two sets of swept spreaders and aluminum spars with 1X19 stainless steel wire rigging. The hull has a hard chine, a plumb stem, a reverse transom with a drop-down tailgate, an internally mounted spade-type rudder controlled by dual wheels tiller and a fixed L-shaped fin keel with a weighted bulb, optional shoal-draft wing keel or stub keel and centerboard, combined with twin rudders. A life raft well is fitted aft.

The fin keel model displaces 14,771 lb (6,700 kg) empty and carries 3,913 lb (1,775 kg) of cast iron ballast, the shoal draft version displaces 15,344 lb (6,960 kg) and carries 4,495 lb (2,039 kg) of cast iron ballast, while the centerboard version displaces 15,961 lb (7,240 kg) and carries 5,099 lb (2,313 kg) of ballast.

The keel-equipped version of the boat has a draft of 6.36 ft (1.94 m), the shoal draft keel-equipped version of the boat has a draft of 4.92 ft (1.50 m), while the centerboard-equipped version has a draft of 7.33 ft (2.23 m) with the centerboard extended and 3.58 ft (1.09 m) with it retracted, allowing operation in shallow water.

The boat is fitted with a Japanese Yanmar diesel engine of 29 hp (22 kW) for docking and maneuvering. The fuel tank holds 34 U.S. gallons (130 L; 28 imp gal) and the fresh water tank has a capacity of 53 U.S. gallons (200 L; 44 imp gal).

The design was built with two and three cabin interior arrangements. The two cabin version has sleeping accommodation for four people, with a double "V"-berth in the bow cabin, a U-shaped settee and a straight settee in the main cabin and an aft cabin with a double berth on the starboard side. The three cabin interior adds a second aft cabin on the port side. The galley is located on the starboard side just forward of the companionway ladder. The galley is L-shaped and is equipped with a two-burner stove, an ice box and a double sink. A navigation station is opposite the galley, on the port side. The head is located at the companionway on the port side and is larger on the two cabin. Cabin maximum headroom is 76 in (193 cm).

For sailing downwind the design may be equipped with a symmetrical spinnaker of 1,066 sq ft (99.0 m^{2}), an asymmetrical spinnaker of 973 sq ft (90.4 m^{2}) or a Code 0 of 594 sq ft (55.2 m^{2}).

The design has a hull speed of 7.83 kn (14.50 km/h) and a PHRF handicap of 102 to 111.

== Operational history ==
In a 2012 boats.com review, Zuzana Prochazka wrote, "it is a sign of the times that a 37-foot boat like the Jeanneau Sun Odyssey 379 is the entry length in a new product line. Boats have been getting bigger in recent years but larger has not necessarily meant more unique or comfortable. It seems to take more innovation to create a streamlined vessel that offers as much as bigger models, which is exactly what Jeanneau has done with this boat."

In Sail Magazine, Bill Springer's 2012 review concluded, "plenty of boats call themselves good-looking and rewarding to sail. Many boats are also designed to be comfortable at sea and in port. But after testing the Jeanneau Sun Odyssey 379 in a healthy sailing breeze, I can honestly say it comes closer to achieving these goals than most. It was a blast to sail. It was easy to sail. It was comfortable to sail, and its accommodations are both spacious and stylish."

Alvah Simon wrote in a 2013 review for Cruising World, "while wanting to appear hard hitting and discerning, I am hard pressed to find any criticisms of this boat. It’s the rare boat I test that I would personally want to own and operate. But for me the 379 hits its marks perfectly regarding safety, size, style, speed, accommodation and equipment."

== See also ==
- List of sailing boat types
