= Swakeleys =

Swakeleys may refer to:

- Swakeleys House
- Swakeleys School for Girls
- Hillingdon (Swakeleys), a London Underground station, now known simply as Hillingdon
- A roundabout on the A40 Western Avenue, London
