= Ruislip Lido =

Reservoir and artificial beach in London

Coordinates: 51.59028°N 0.43230°W

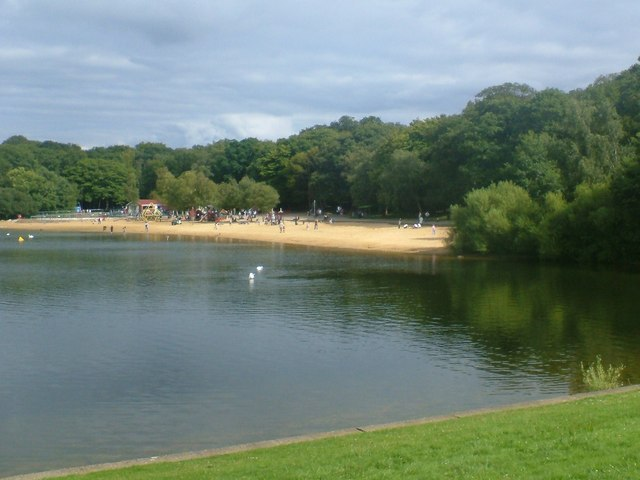
View of the south-east bay of the reservoir.

Ruislip Lido (/ˈraɪslɪp ˈlaɪdoʊ/ RY-slip LY-doh) is a reservoir and artificial beach in Ruislip, within the London Borough of Hillingdon, England, situated between Ruislip Common, Ruislip Woods (a Site of Special Scientific Interest), and Poor's Field.

Originally created as a feeder basin for the Grand Junction Canal in 1811, the reservoir was reopened in 1933 as a lido, with facilities for swimming and boating. During the Second World War, the lido was secretly used by the Royal Air Force to train aircrew based at RAF Northolt and RAF Uxbridge in water survival methods. A narrow gauge railway, the Ruislip Lido Railway was opened in 1945, and now runs about two thirds of the distance around the reservoir.

Having fallen into a state of disrepair during the 1970s and 1980s, the lido has since undergone renewal works, and was the subject of an enhancement project unveiled by the London Borough of Hillingdon in January 2010. The project involved the return of boating and swimming in the reservoir, which had previously not been possible due to pollution and an artificially low water level.

== History ==
=== Construction ===
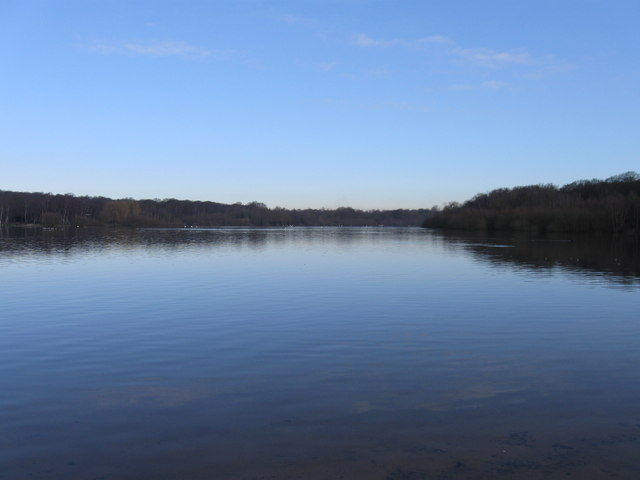
View across the Lido.

The Grand Junction Canal Company purchased 61.5 acres (24.9 ha) of Park Wood from King's College, Cambridge, 56 acres (23 ha) of land from the commissioners, and 35 acres (14 ha) of the cottages and gardens of the hamlet of Park Hearne. The valley that the land covered was then dammed and flooded.

Engineer John Rennie and constructor Hugh Mackintosh opened the reservoir on 5 December 1811 as one of the feeders for the Grand Junction Canal. Because the water became polluted by residues from the flooded land, the reservoir did not fulfil its intended purpose, and its role as a feeder ceased in 1851.

The canal (now renamed the Grand Union Canal) is 7 miles (11 km) to the west of the basin, so a culvert was built to lead water into the canal at Hayes Bridge. Some of the route was underground and parts have been built over. Part of the route includes a little-known aqueduct which carries the canal feeder over the River Pinn near Woodville Gardens.

=== Lido opening ===
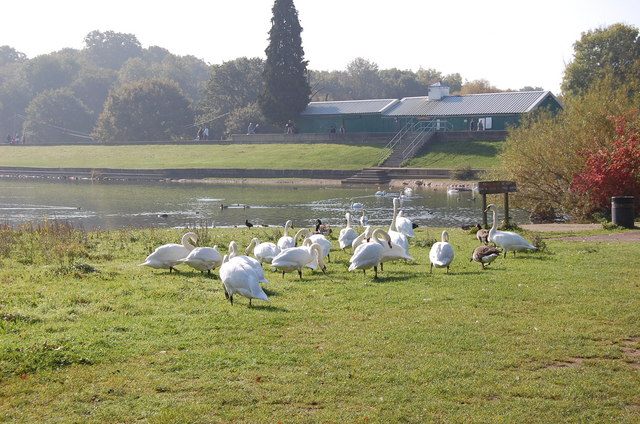
Swans at Ruislip Lido.

The reservoir was developed as a lido in 1933, with an Art Deco-style main building designed by George W. Smith, together with an area reserved for swimming. The formal opening was by Earl Howe in 1936. The building included a cafe and changing rooms, and featured a terrace with steps leading into the enclosed swimming pool. The pool was built with a concrete base, with jetties on either side, but was open to the lido.

Rowing boats were available for hire, with boathouses on the western side of the reservoir. An enclosed boating area for children was later constructed. The reservoir became a popular location for water-skiing, and televised championships were often held there. One of the Ruislip Water Ski Club's founding members was the former Doctor Who actor Jon Pertwee.

Ruislip Sailing Club was based at the lido, using the Graduate and Solo dinghy types. In the 1970s, the reservoir water level was artificially lowered to prevent the flooding of nearby housing, making it unsuitable for dinghy sailing.

Several films were made there, including Confessions from a Holiday Camp with Robin Askwith, The Young Ones with Cliff Richard and A Night to Remember, in which a large model of the RMS Titanic "sank on film".

== Ruislip Lido Railway ==
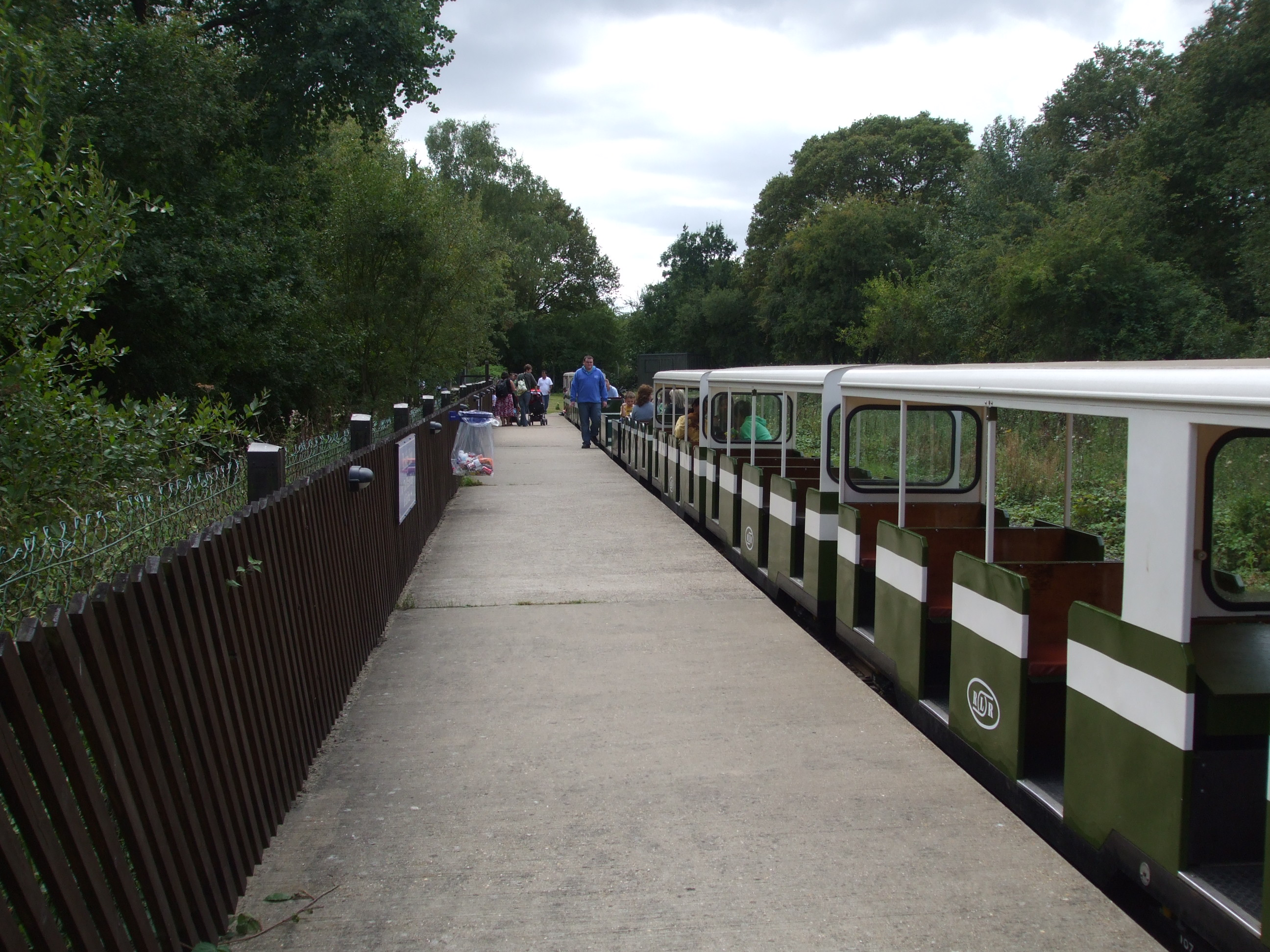
The miniature railway, photographed in 2009.

The railway was opened in 1945, with short trains being hauled by Prince Edward, an Atlantic-type steam locomotive. The line was less than a third of what it is today, as it was just a dog bone circuit on the south-east shore of the lido, running around the woods. It was built by the Grand Union Canal Company as part of the Lido along with a beach on the south-east shore.

The Ruislip Lido Railway (miniature railway) is still running today, staffed by volunteers, and has been lengthened considerably, a second station and platform having been added near the Water's Edge pub.

== Decline and future development ==
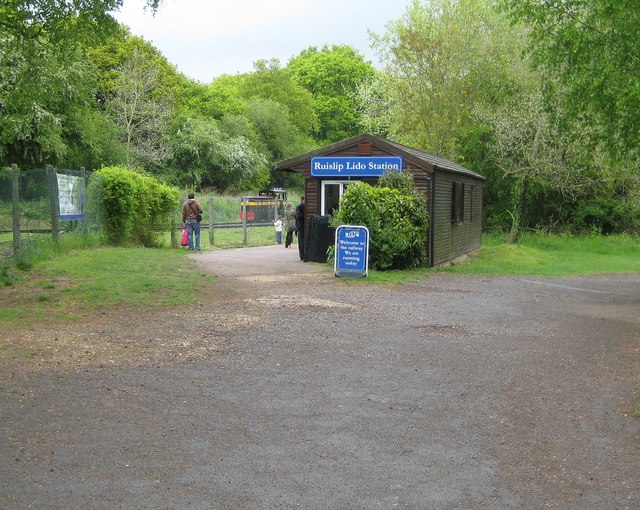
Ruislip Lido station on the extended section of the railway.

It is said that the local council ran the lido into financial ruin in the 1970s by raising the admission fee beyond the level the market would stand. Additionally, the main Art Deco building was closed and became subject to vandalism. In June 1993, it was damaged beyond repair in an arson attack and was demolished in 1994. The building was replaced in 1996 by a restaurant named The Waters Edge (sic), built in a similar style.

The lido remains a popular location for sunbathing and beach games, and although swimming is officially not allowed owing to pollution and lack of lifeguards, people do swim there. A splash pad water play area for children was built in 2009. Throughout the summer of 2011, the splash pad was closed after the electrics were damaged beyond repair during construction of a new toilet block.

In January 2010, Hillingdon Council unveiled an enhancement project for the lido.

The establishment of boating areas would require the water level to be raised, which the Environment Agency raised concerns over due to the potential for the flooding of nearby homes. The water level had been kept artificially low since 1992 when floods caused damage to newly built houses close by. The engineering consultancy firm Halcrow Group presented a report to Hillingdon Council in April 2010 recommending a £250,000 flood mitigation scheme.

In January 2012, the plans received the necessary safety approvals from the Environment Agency in order to proceed.
