= Northwood School, London =

Northwood School

Location
- Pinner Road; Northwood, London, HA6 1QN; England; 51.6037°N 0.4060°W

Information
- Type: Academy
- Trust: Partnership Learning
- Department for Education URN: 137829 Tables
- Ofsted: Reports
- Headteacher/Principal: Mehul Shah
- Gender: Coeducational
- Age: 11 to 18
- Enrolment: 1007 (2024)
- Website: www.northwoodschool.org.uk

Northwood School is a co-educational secondary school and sixth form located in the Northwood area of the London Borough of Hillingdon, England.

== History ==
The school was originally opened in January 1934 as Potter Street Senior Council School with an age range from 11 to 14. The original headmaster was Mr. A. T. Smith, who had previously headed a school in Ruislip.

Previously a foundation school administered by Hillingdon London Borough Council, in February 2012 Northwood School converted to academy status. The school is now sponsored by Partnership Learning. The school was then selected as the site of a brand new aviation college in association with British Airways and Brunel University. Demolition work of the old buildings began in September 2013 and the new complex, named 'Heathrow Aviation Engineering University Technical College' (Heathrow Aviation Engineering UTC), was officially opened in May 2015.

In 2014, it was confirmed that Northwood School had received the go ahead of a £28 million project to re-build the entire school with modern, state of the art facilities, with scheduled completion of the new complex in September 2016.

In 2018, the school obtained "Outstanding" in Ofsted inspection.

== Notable former pupils ==
The Olympic boxer Audley Harrison and Big Brother contestant Nikki Grahame are both alumni of the school. Dame Menna Rawlings, President of Queens’ College, Cambridge, and formerly the UK’s ambassador to France and Monaco, also attended the school.
