= Penrhyn Main Line class =

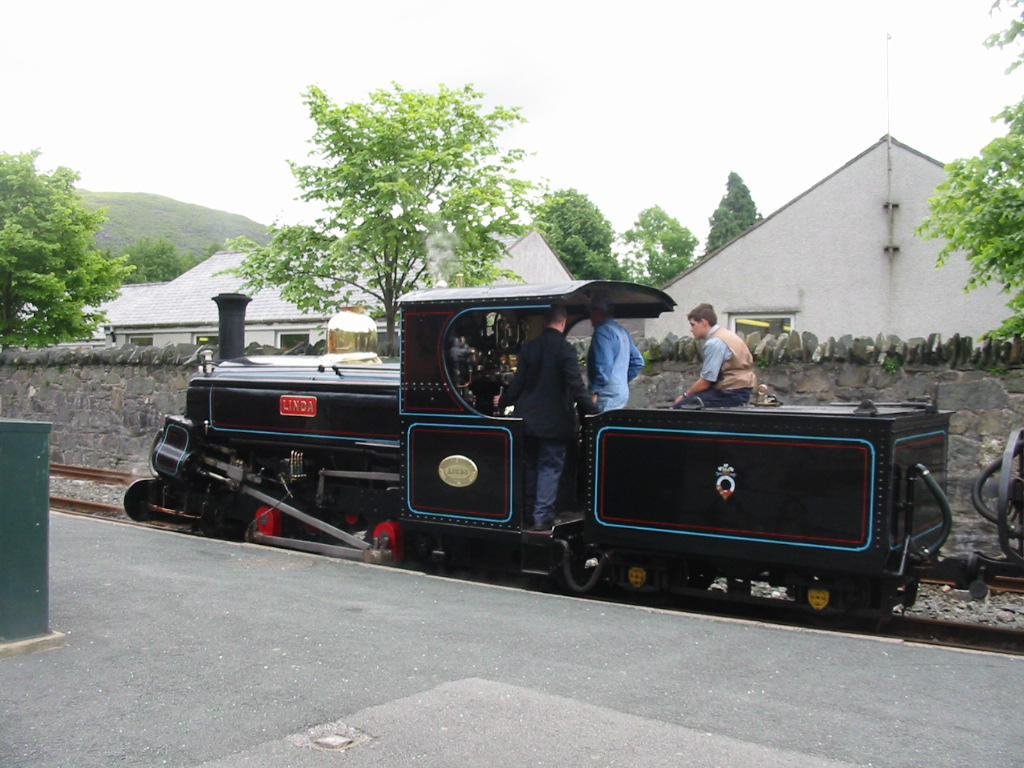
Type and origin
- Power type: Steam
- Builder: Hunslet Engine Company
- Build date: 1882 (1), 1893 (2)
Specifications
- Configuration
  - Whyte: Original: 0-4-0ST, Rebuilt by FR: 2-4-0ST+T
  - UIC: Original: B n2 Rebuilt by FR: 1′B n2
- Gauge: Original: 1 ft 10 3/4 in (578 mm), Rebuilt by FR: 1 ft 11 1/2 in (597 mm)
- Driver dia.: 2 ft 1 in (635 mm)
- Wheelbase: 5 ft 0 in (1.52 m)
- Length: 16 ft 7 in (5.05 m)
- Fuel type: Coal & Oil
- Water cap.: 500 imp gal (2,300 L; 600 US gal)
- Boiler pressure: 140 lbf/in^{2} (970 kPa)
- Cylinders: Two
Career
- Number in class: 3
- Official name: Charles, Linda, Blanche
- Locale: Penrhyn Quarry Railway and Ffestiniog Railway
- Preserved: All preserved

The Penrhyn Main Line class is a class of three narrow gauge steam locomotives built for the Penrhyn Quarry Railway (PQR). These locomotives were built by the Hunslet Engine Company between 1882 and 1893 and supplied specifically to work the railway that connected the Penrhyn Quarry near Bethesda in north Wales to Port Penrhyn on the Menai Strait.

== Penrhyn Quarry Railway ==
The original locomotives to work the "main line" of the PQR were a series of horizontal boilered De Winton locomotives delivered in 1879. These proved inadequate for the task of moving substantial quantities of slate over the railway and in 1882 a more conventional locomotive was ordered from Hunslet to work the railway. This was the first of the "Main Line class" locomotives Charles. Charles was joined in 1893 by two more locomotives to the same design but slightly enlarged, which were named Linda and Blanche. These were the sole locomotives built to this design.

== Preservation ==
All three locomotives were preserved after the closure of the PQR. Charles was donated to the Penrhyn Castle Railway Museum.

Linda was loaned to the nearby Ffestiniog Railway in July 1962. For the 1963 season the locomotive was regauged to the Ffestiniog's 1 ft 11 1/2 in (597 mm) and purchased, along with Blanche at the end of the year. Both have since received extensive modifications including tenders, pony trucks and superheaters.

== Technical specification ==
The following technical specification are for the locomotives as delivered from Hunslet and are from unless otherwise stated:

	Charles	Linda and Blanche
Boiler grate area	4.5 sq ft (0.42 m^{2})	5.2 sq ft (0.48 m^{2})
Boiler pressure	140 lbf/in^{2} (970 kPa)	140 lbf/in^{2} (970 kPa)
Water storage	500 gallon saddle tank	500 gallon saddle tank
Cylinders	Two, outside, 10 in × 12 in (254 mm × 305 mm)	Two, outside, 10.5 in × 12 in (267 mm × 305 mm)
Driving wheels	2 ft 1 in (635 mm) diameter	2 ft 1 in (635 mm) diameter
Wheelbase	5 ft 0 in (1.52 m)	5 ft 0 in (1.52 m)
Front overhang	5 ft 7 in (1.70 m)	5 ft 7 in (1.70 m)
Rear overhang	6 ft 0 in (1.83 m)	6 ft 3 in (1.91 m)
Tractive effort	5,050 lbf (22.46 kN)	5,550 lbf (24.69 kN)

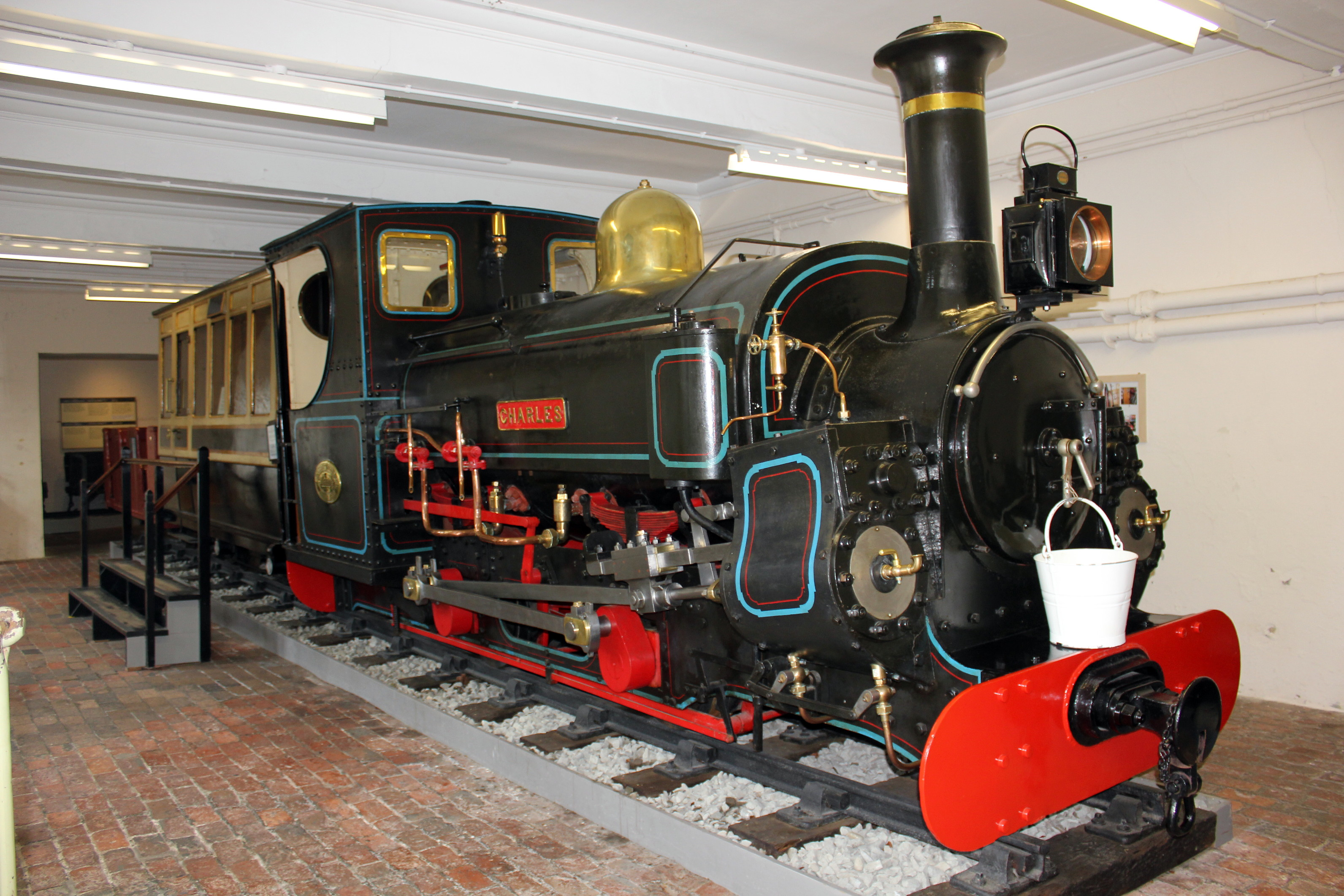
Charles at Penrhyn Castle

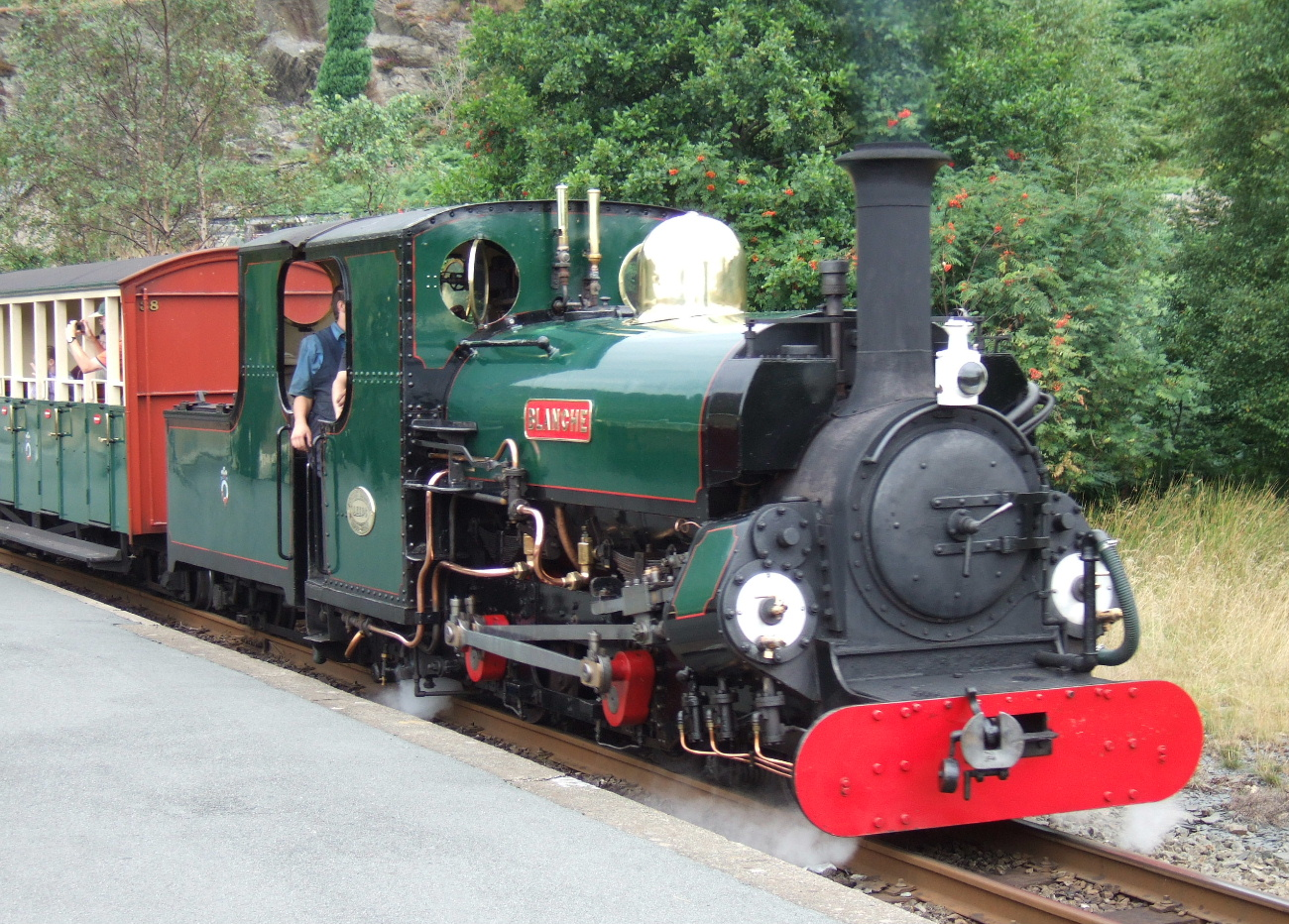
Blanche running on the Ffestiniog Railway as a 2-4-0 with tender

== See also ==
- Ruislip Lido Railway – Mad Bess is a 12-inch (305 mm) gauge miniature railway locomotive based on Blanche
- Ffestiniog Railway rolling stock
