= Ruislip Lido Railway =

12 inch gauge miniature railway in London

Coordinates: 51°35′35″N 0°25′55″W

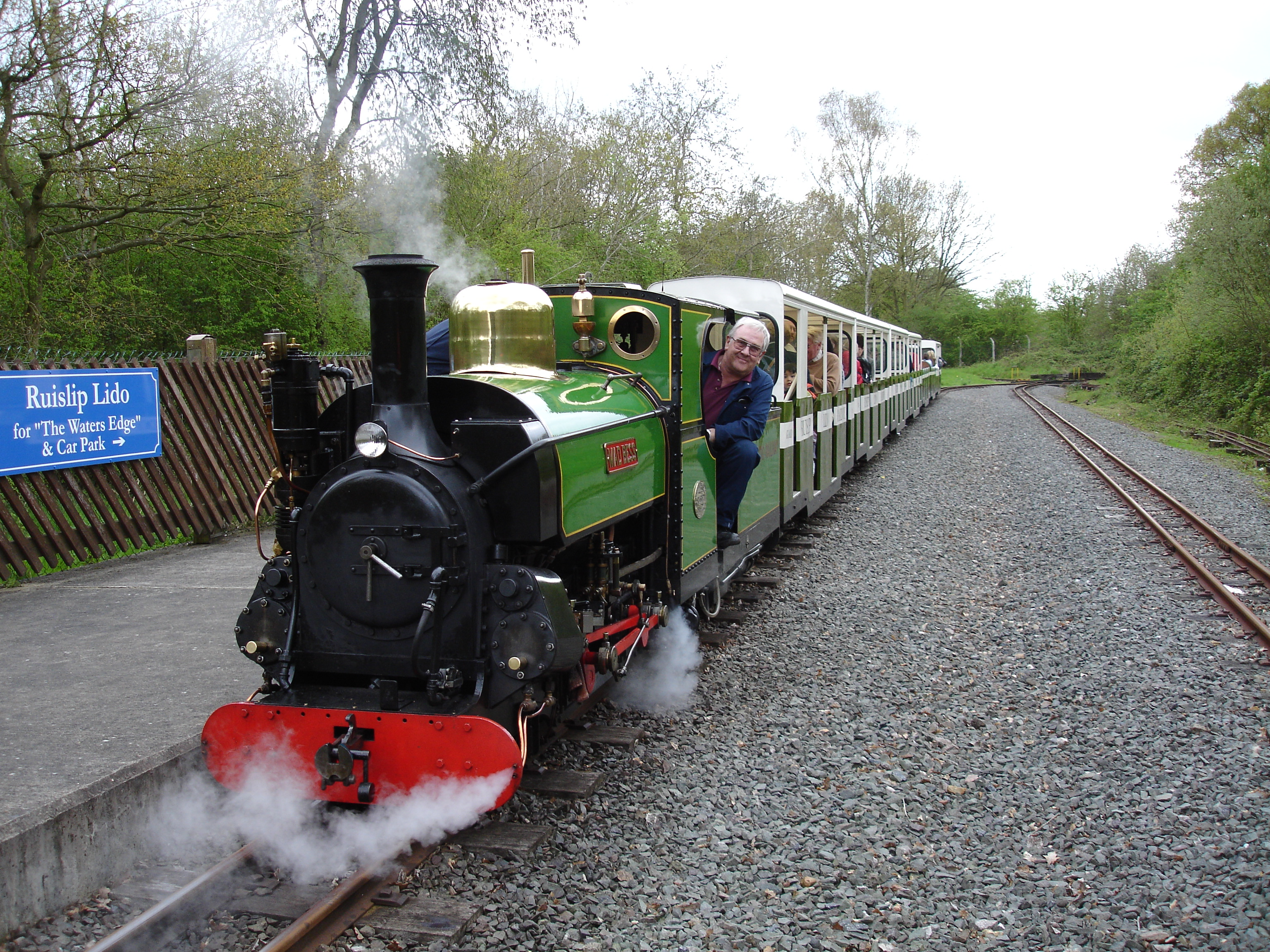
- 'Mad Bess' is seen at Willow Lawn station (then called Ruislip Lido station) with a train ready to depart.

Overview
- Locale: Ruislip, London Borough of Hillingdon

Technical
- Track gauge: 12 in (305 mm)
- Length: 1.02 mi (1.64 km)

Other
- Website: http://www.ruisliplidorailway.org

The Ruislip Lido Railway is a 12 in (305 mm) gauge miniature railway around Ruislip Lido in Ruislip, 14 miles (22.5 km) north-west of central London. Running from the main station at Woody Bay by the lido's beach, on a 1.02-mile (1.64 km) track around the reservoir, the railway passes through Ruislip Woods to Willow Lawn station and tea room near the lido's car parks. It is the longest 12 in (305 mm) gauge railway in the United Kingdom.

Originally built by the Grand Union Canal Company over a much shorter route, the line has been extended in recent years and now covers more than two thirds of the perimeter of the reservoir. It has been operated since 1979 by the Ruislip Lido Railway Society (RLRS).

== Route description ==
At one end of the railway, Willow Lawn station was previously known (until summer 2013) as Ruislip Lido (Water's Edge) station. It features three platforms and a turntable.

There is a level crossing between Willow Lawn and the next station, Haste Hill. Formerly a terminus, Haste Hill is now a through station and a request stop for trains heading to Willow Lawn only. Haste Hill, which also has a turntable, became a temporary terminus of the line again in early 2013 owing to major works at Willow Lawn station associated with the Lido redevelopment programme.

There was formerly a terminus at Eleanor's Loop, and the site of this station (now disused) can still be seen.

From Eleanor's Junction (Eleanor's Loop until February 2017) to Woody Bay the railway features double track, widening into a balloon loop at Woody Bay station. The loop encircles the main running sheds. The rest of the railway is single track with a passing loop at Haste Hill.

== History ==
The railway was built in 1945 by the Grand Union Canal Company as part of Ruislip Lido, with short trains hauled by the Atlantic-type steam locomotive, Prince Edward. Built along the south-east shore of the reservoir, where a beach had been created, control of the lido passed to Ruislip-Northwood Urban District Council (RNUDC) when the Grand Union was nationalised.

One or two people normally staffed the line with major work contracted out. Prince Edward was joined by a petrol-electric locomotive in 1959, although the antiquated 12 in (305 mm) gauge meant locomotives and rolling stock were not widely available and therefore expensive.

The RNUDC became part of the London Borough of Hillingdon in 1965. Subsequent neglect of the lido as well as its entrance fees reduced visitor numbers. By the mid-1970s the Hunt locomotive was becoming unreliable and a new locomotive was purchased from the manufacturer Severn Lamb in 1973. An accident in 1978, which injured several people in a derailment due to speeding, resulted in closure of the railway, which soon began to display signs of dereliction.

In 1979, the Ruislip Lido Railway Society was established to take on the running of the railway and the line reopened ready for the summer of 1980. Keeping the line open became a struggle, with either too few passengers to pay for fuel or too many for the trains to accommodate comfortably. Despite this, work commenced on an extension around the lido to the main car park. Leaving the circuit near where the accident happened, the line carried on through woodland to Eleanor's Loop.

A new locomotive was ordered from the Ravenglass and Eskdale Railway (R&ER) in Cumbria, and named Lady of the Lakes. Previously 15 in (381 mm) gauge to allow trials to be carried out on the R&ER, the locomotive was converted to 12 in (305 mm) on arrival. Lady of the Lakes entered service just before the new station opened, equipped with newly designed carriages built in the railway's workshops. The line was extended again to Haste Hill, which involved the construction of cuttings, embankments, steep gradients and tight curves.

In 1990, a new and more powerful locomotive was purchased from Severn Lamb and Haste Hill station opened. Ballast for maintenance began to be carried on the railway using appropriate rolling stock. A storage shed was built alongside the carriage shed and a workshop in the yard at Woody Bay. Woody Bay station received a ticket office, and a control room, and the platforms were extended. A water tower was also built in preparation for the arrival in 1998 of a new steam engine, Mad Bess. The third extension from Haste Hill to the lido entrance opened in the same year.

A new diesel locomotive arrived from Severn Lamb in 2003, followed by an identical one the following year.

A special 2009 production for Halloween was held at the railway in association with the Argosy Players, a local dramatic group from the Compass Theatre in Ickenham. The "Mad Bess Express" purported to explain the origins of the name of the Mad Bess Wood and involved trains being met in the woods by actors dressed to resemble ghosts and ghouls.

In 2010, the Woody Bay ticket office and the nearby children's playground were damaged by vandals driving a stolen tractor.

== Rolling stock ==
=== Current locomotives ===
The railway currently operates a fleet of six locomotives. No 3 Robert is considered a heritage asset, and generally used only as specially advertised. A seventh locomotive was purchased in November 2025.

No.	Name	Built	Livery	Locomotive type	Wheel arr.	Builder	In Traffic?	Image
3	Robert	1973	Dark blue	Diesel-hydraulic	4w-4	Severn Lamb	No	
5	Lady of the Lakes	1986	Red	Diesel-mechanical	4w-4w	Ravenglass and Eskdale Railway	Yes	
6	Mad Bess	1986-98	Green	Steam	2-4-0ST+T	Ruislip Lido Railway Society Based on Blanche, at the Ffestiniog Railway; converted to oil-firing to avoid fire risk.	Yes	
7	Graham Alexander	1989-90	Longmoor Military Railway Blue	Battery-electric	4w-4w	Severn Lamb	Yes	
8	Bayhurst	2003	Green	Diesel-mechanical	4w-4w	Severn Lamb	Yes	
9	John Rennie	2004	'Metropolitan Railway' Dark red / Maroon	Diesel-mechanical	4w-4w	Severn Lamb	Yes	
10	Dougal	1970 (Note: Purchased second hand in 2025)	Penrhyn Quarry Black	Steam	0-6-2T+T	Severn Lamb	No (Note: Owned by the railway but not yet on site)	

=== Former locomotives ===
The railway formerly operated the following locomotives.

No.	Name	Built	Livery	Locomotive type	Wheel arr.	Builder	Current location	Image
1	Prince Edward	1935	Green	Steam	4-4-2	George Flooks (Watford)	Moved (1960) to Spittal railway, Northumberland; then to Olicana Miniature Railway, Yorkshire; then (briefly) to Littlehampton Miniature Railway; then to South Coast World Railway, Bognor Regis; then sold into private ownership in 1987.	
2	The Northwardian	1959	Green	Petrol-electric (American outline)	4w-4w	Geoffrey Hunt (Bristol)	Dismantled 1974	
4	Thunderbolt I	1968	Blue	Diesel-mechanical	4w	Shepperton Metal Products		

=== Passenger coaches ===
The following passenger coaches are currently in use.

Number in use	Type	Notes
6	Enclosed saloon coach	16-seater, air-braked
4	Enclosed brake coach	12-seater, air-braked, plus 2-seat guard/brake compartment
6	Open (roofless) coach	16-seater, air-braked
2	Open brake coach	12-seater, air-braked, plus 2-seat guard/brake compartment
3	Passenger buggy wagon	Air-braked; carry pushchairs, wheelchairs, luggage, scooters

=== Engineering vehicles ===
The following engineering vehicles are currently in use.

Number in use	Type	Notes
1	Permanent Way mess coach	8-seater engineers' carriage, with large equipment/tool storage compartment
1	Bogie open wagon	
4	Bogie flat wagons	Optional superstructure for conversion to open wagons
4	4-wheel tipper truck	Acquired used from sewage works railway
2	4-wheel tipper truck	Constructed by RLRS in 2010

== Operations ==
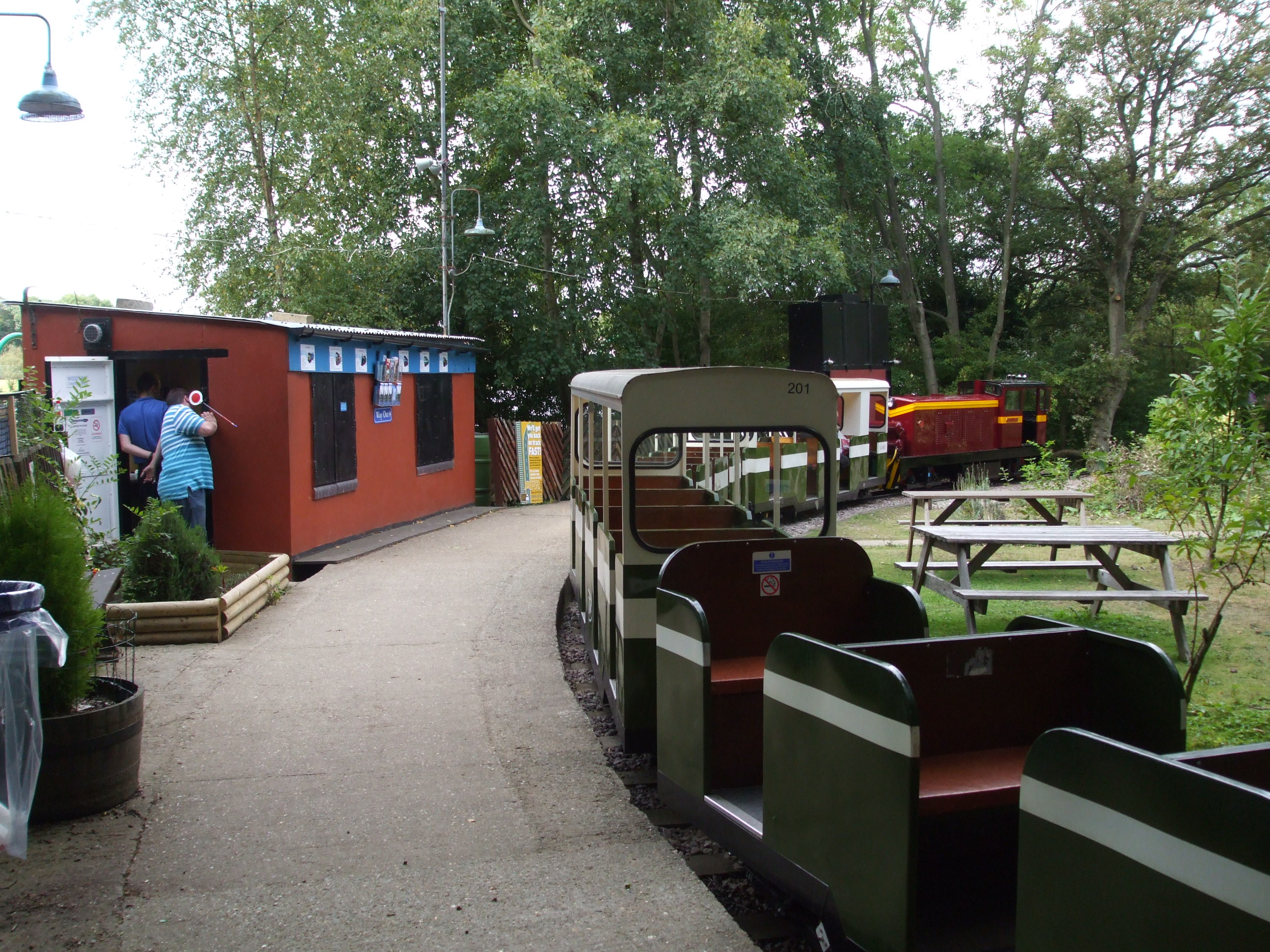
Woody Bay station platform

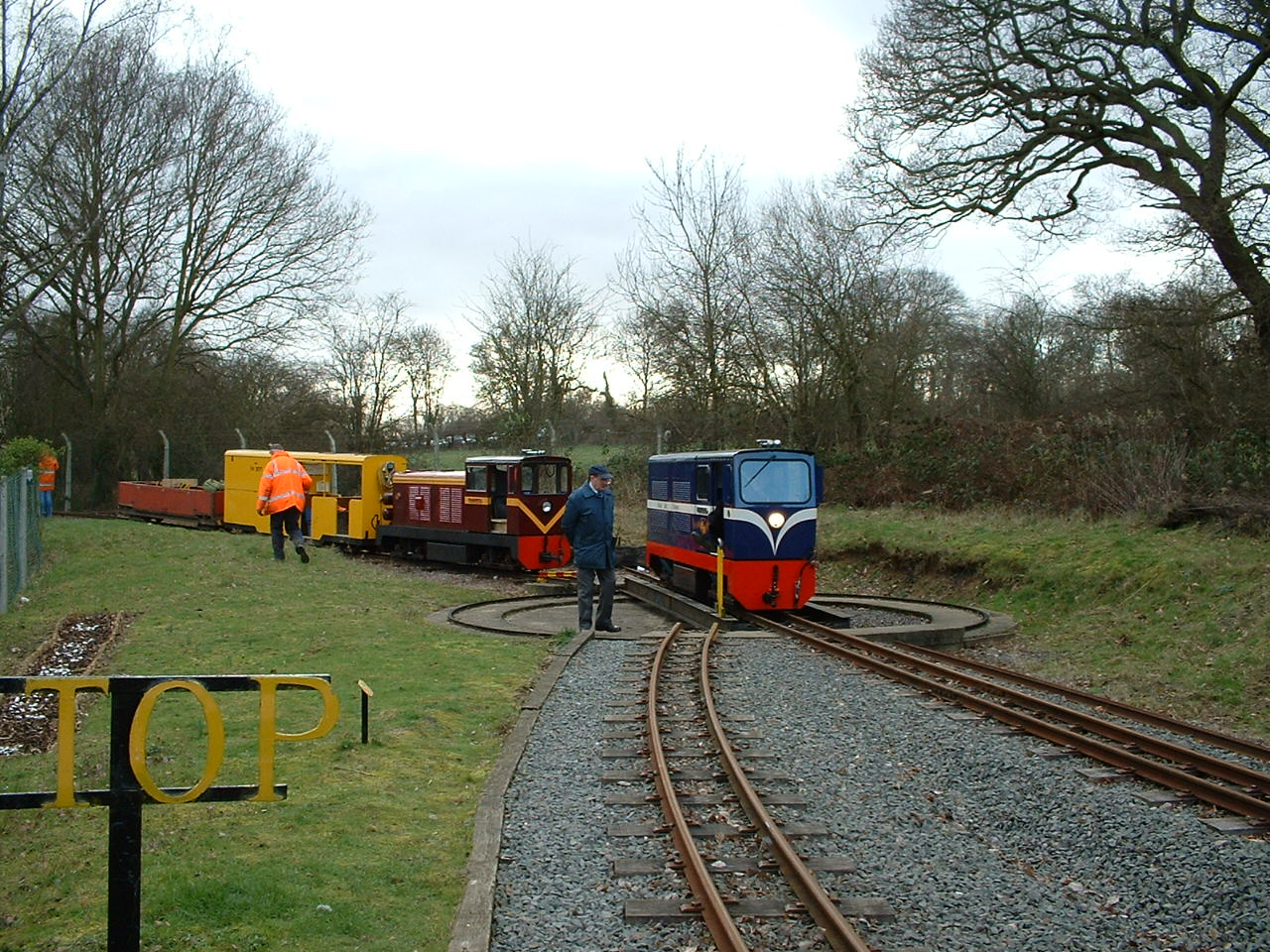
'Graham Alexander' on the Ruislip Lido Station turntable with 'Lady of the Lakes' in the background with the maintenance train

The railway generally operates on a 'one engine in steam' principle on most days, operating throughout the year on weekends and daily during half terms and school holidays. From the first Sunday after New Year's Day until mid February, the railway closes for 6 weeks for the annual maintenance shutdown, allowing the opportunity for unhindered access to the railway to complete infrastructure projects and renewals that would not be possible with trains running.

On busy days when there is demand and sufficient volunteers available multiple trains can be run, using either a radio control system or a token working system. When operating multiple trains under radio control, one of the railway's qualified controllers will operate the control office at Woody Bay. Trains are given permission to enter different block sections via radio from the controller, who records train movements on a graph. No two trains can be in the same section at one time, except under caution for the purpose of one assisting the other.

The standard multiple train service is for two passenger trains, either both of 9 carriages or one 10 and one 8 carriage train; both use all 18 of the railway's carriages. Radio control can accommodate more than two trains if required, and also facilitate different / unusual movements where necessary. On two occasions during late 2016, two separate Permanent Way trains were run along with the standard passenger train, leading to three trains on the line with only Haste Hill for passing, leading to careful planning and coordination being required.

Special events are run throughout the year, with either a 'Teddy Bear Picnic' or 'Easter Eggspress' running around Easter time, 'Open Days' traditionally held in May and September, and the popular 'Santa Specials' event held over 4 days in the lead up to Christmas.

The railway is run entirely by unpaid volunteers with young rail enthusiasts involved in its operation. The railway has various departments looking after specialist areas within the railway. Locomotives and rolling stock are maintained in the workshop at Woody Bay by dedicated teams of volunteers. The railway also has its own team of volunteer permanent way staff who maintain the track.

== Permanent way ==
This section details the original permanent way. It also outlines the three major track re-laying projects (in the 1950s, 1980s, and 2000s), and the three major track extension projects (in 1986, 1990, and 1997).

=== Original line and first re-laying ===
The railway was laid in 1945 with 14 lb per yard rail, a small amount of which survives in use in the workshops, together with a significant amount converted to fencing around the railway site. There was a mixture of small but long profile wooden sleepers (with the rail secured using dog spikes), and small metal sleepers (with small nuts and bolts holding a very small plate on the foot of the rail). The RLRS still possesses three original 1945 metal sleepers, and a small quantity of 14 lb rail, with one pair of fishplates. Rough shingle ballast was used. The line side was equipped with cosmetic (non-functioning) signals, level crossing, water tower, and coaling stage, to enhance the railway atmosphere.

It is recorded that the entire line was first re-laid with new rail upon the arrival of the Hunt locomotive in 1959/1960. Nonetheless, the light-weight and poor quality track is thought to have contributed to the derailment in May 1978 that led to the closure of the railway. When the RLRS took over operation in 1979 extensive remedial works were required, whilst the top loop curve (site of the derailment) was fully re-laid in 20 lb rail before services resumed.

=== Second re-laying ===
As part of the agreement for handing over total control of the railway on Good Friday 1980, the London Borough of Hillingdon stipulated that the whole of the original dog bone circuit was to be re-laid within the first five years. The RLRS achieved this by the end of year four, using new larger softwood sleepers, and 20 lb rail (generally in 18 ft lengths) secured with dog spikes.

Although monetary constraints prevented any kind of proper base being laid below the sleepers, fresh limestone ballast was also laid. However, the lack of any base below the bottom of the sleepers has caused continual issues. Many sleepers were laid directly onto the ground of London Clay, and the passage of trains did cause the track to sink very gradually into the clay. The problem sections have since been gradually improved.

=== Three extensions ===
The original line was extended to Eleanor's Loop in 1986, then to Haste Hill in 1990, and finally to Willow Lawn in 1997.

The first extension (stage 1) utilised a slightly larger type of softwood sleeper, with the 20 lb rail (in longer 30 ft lengths) secured with dog spikes. It terminated at a new station at Eleanor's Loop.

The second extension (stage 2) in 1990 took the line to a large new station at Haste Hill. To address issues with gauge creep and rail joint movement (and following a 1988 trial of coach screws and plates at Woody Bay) this extension was laid entirely with coach screws on pre-assembled track panels. A programme to replace all dog spikes with coach screws has since been undertaken across the entire line, resulting in better ride quality, and improved safety.

In February 1992, the specification of 'stage 3' of the railway extension to Willow Lawn proposed using heavier permanent way, requiring less fettling and alignment to maintain good condition. The intention was to lay stage 3 to a heavier standard, using large hardwood jarrah sleepers, 30 lb rail, large lipped plates, and large coach screws. This heavy track has performed well over the years, but the jarrah sleepers began to fail barely 10 years after the extension had been completed, and they are now being replaced with Douglas Fir softwood sleepers. Stage 3 opened in 1997, terminating at a large new station named "Ruislip Lido (Water's Edge)", and since renamed "Willow Lawn".

=== Third re-laying and current permanent way ===
In early 2000, a plan of major track renewals was formulated, to gradually upgrade the entire permanent way to the higher standard of the Willow Lawn (stage 3) extension. This was achieved by the end of the 2010 winter shutdown, including all running lines (original circuit, plus stage 1 and stage 2 extensions), loops, and junction point-work. This was the third major re-laying project in the line's history.

Despite earlier aspirations to relay the entire line with 30 lb rail, the existing 20 lb rail was re-used, with now standard large softwood sleepers throughout. High quality coach screws and plates were utilised, and hundreds of tonnes of new granite ballast deployed. The track height was significantly raised in places to give a reasonable depth of ballast under the sleepers, with the sub-formation improved, or completely rebuilt in some locations. The last surviving section of stage 2 (1990) track formation (100 ft of the platform road at Haste Hill station) was relaid in March 2017.

From 2015, plans known as 'stage 4' emerged, for the doubling of the previously single-line section from Wellington Junction to Eleanor's Loop, thus improving operational flexibility, and eliminating the redundant passing loop at the former Eleanor's Loop station, now too short for safe use. Standard Douglas Fir softwood sleepers were used, along with large coach screws and lipped plates, to fix 14 kg per metre rail (very similar to the 30 lb rail used on the stage 3 extension). The rails are in 40 ft lengths, the longest the railway has ever used, with special transition rails (fabricated in the railway's workshop) to join the 14 kg per metre rail to the existing 20 lb per yard rail.

With completion of stage 4 in April 2017, Eleanor's Loop (no longer a physical loop) was renamed Eleanor's Junction. There is now just under two and a half miles of track in total, with the main line double-track for over half its length.

In 2021, the railway began construction of an island platform at Willow Lawn station, to increase the capacity of the station from one to three platform faces. The new platform will be 60 metres long, allowing the railway to operate longer trains. Like the existing platform, it will be wheelchair accessible.
