= Park Academy West London =

Location
- Park View Road; Yiewsley; London Borough of Hillingdon, UB8 3GA; England; 51.5184°N 0.4603°W

Information
- Former names: Stockley Academy 2004-2017
- Type: Academy
- Motto: Aspiration Ambition Achievement
- Established: 2017
- Local authority: Hillingdon
- Trust: Aspirations Academies Trust
- Specialist: Science and Technology
- Department for Education URN: 145121 Tables
- Ofsted: Reports
- Principal: Suvi Mohey
- Gender: Coeducational
- Age: 11 to 18
- Enrolment: 749 (Ofsted January 2020)
- Houses: Kensington, Hyde, Richmond, Greenwich
- Colour: Sky Blue
- Website: https://www.park-aspirations.org/

Park Academy West London is a coeducational secondary school and sixth form located in the Yiewsley area of the London Borough of Hillingdon, England.

== History ==
=== Stockley Academy ===
The school opened as Stockley Academy on 1 September 2004, receiving approximately £28 million of funding for construction and equipment from the government and sponsors. The Academy replaced Evelyns Community School which was situated approximately 100m to its north.

In September 2015 an Ofsted report classified the school as 'Inadequate' and it was placed in 'special measures'. On 31 August 2017 Stockley Academy was closed. The building was reopened on 1 September 2017 as Park Academy West London, part of the Aspirations Academies Trust.

=== Evelyns Community School ===
Evelyns School was opened to pupils from Yiewsley and South Hillingdon on 7 January 1936 as Evelyns Council School. Its official opening by Sir Howard Stransom Button J.P., Chairman of Middlesex County Council took place on 11 March 1936. The school cost £32,000 and was named in honour of the Evelyns Preparatory School which stood 200m to its east and had closed in 1931.

Evelyns Community School was closed on 31 August 2004 with Stockley Academy opening the next day.

=== Evelyns Preparatory School ===
Evelyns Preparatory School was an independent fee-paying school in Colham Green, Hillingdon. It was founded in 1872 by Mr Godfrey Thomas Worsley of Colham House, Hillingdon and was regarded as one of the leading preparatory schools in the country. It had an especially strong connection with Eton, to which the majority of the pupils graduated, and also with Harrow, Charterhouse and Wellington. Evelyns closed in 1931 with some staff members being transferred to the Farnborough School.

== See also ==
- List of schools in Hillingdon
