= Sun Odyssey 389 =

Sailboat class

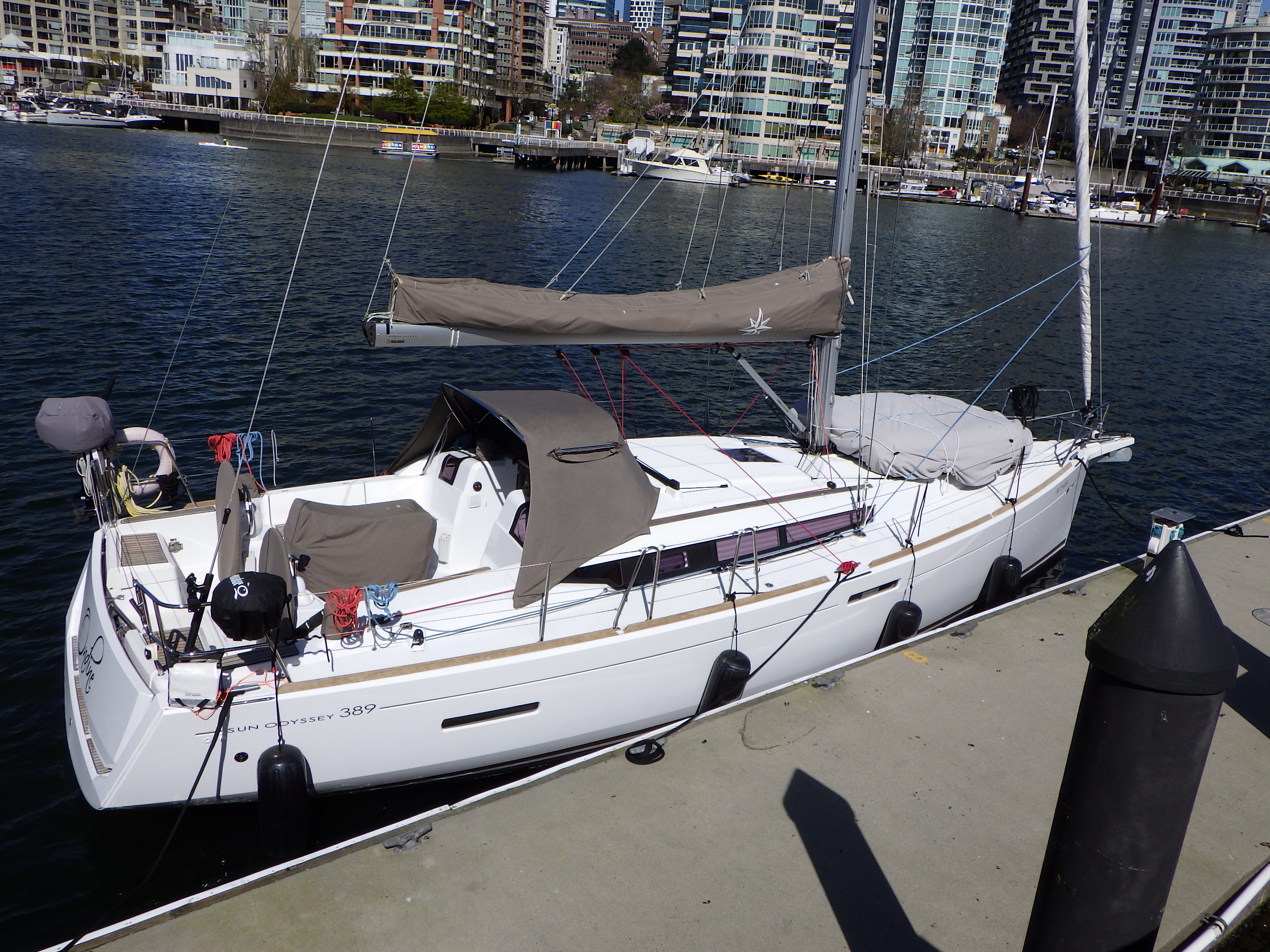

Development
- Designer: Marc Lombard; Jeanneau Design Office
- Location: France
- Year: 2015
- Builder: Jeanneau
- Role: Cruiser
- Name: Sun Odyssey 389

Boat
- Displacement: 14,771 lb (6,700 kg)
- Draft: 6.50 ft (1.98 m)

Hull
- Type: monohull
- Construction: fiberglass
- LOA: 38.50 ft (11.73 m)
- LWL: 34.08 ft (10.39 m)
- Beam: 12.33 ft (3.76 m)
- Engine: Yanmar 29 hp (22 kW) diesel engine

Hull appendages
- Keel: fin keel with weighted bulb
- Ballast: 3,913 lb (1,775 kg)
- Rudder: spade-type rudder

Rig
- Rig type: Bermuda rig
- I foretriangle height: 46.58 ft (14.20 m)
- J foretriangle base: 13.58 ft (4.14 m)
- P mainsail luff: 44.58 ft (13.59 m)
- E mainsail foot: 13.92 ft (4.24 m)

Sails
- Sailplan: 9/10 fractional rigged sloop
- Mainsail area: 377 sq ft (35.0 m^{2})
- Jib/genoa area: 251 sq ft (23.3 m^{2})
- Spinnaker area: 1,066 sq ft (99.0 m^{2})
- Gennaker area: 973 sq ft (90.4 m^{2})
- Other sails: genoa: 377 sq ft (35.0 m^{2}); Code 0: 594 sq ft (55.2 m^{2})
- Upwind sail area: 753 sq ft (70.0 m^{2})
- Downwind sail area: 1,442 sq ft (134.0 m^{2})

The Sun Odyssey 389 is a French sailboat that was designed by Marc Lombard and the Jeanneau Design Office, as a cruiser and first built in 2015.

The boat is a development of the Sun Odyssey 379 with the same hull design, with a wider drop-down swimming platform and a bowsprit added.

== Production ==
The design was built by Jeanneau in France, starting in 2015, but it is now out of production.

== Design ==
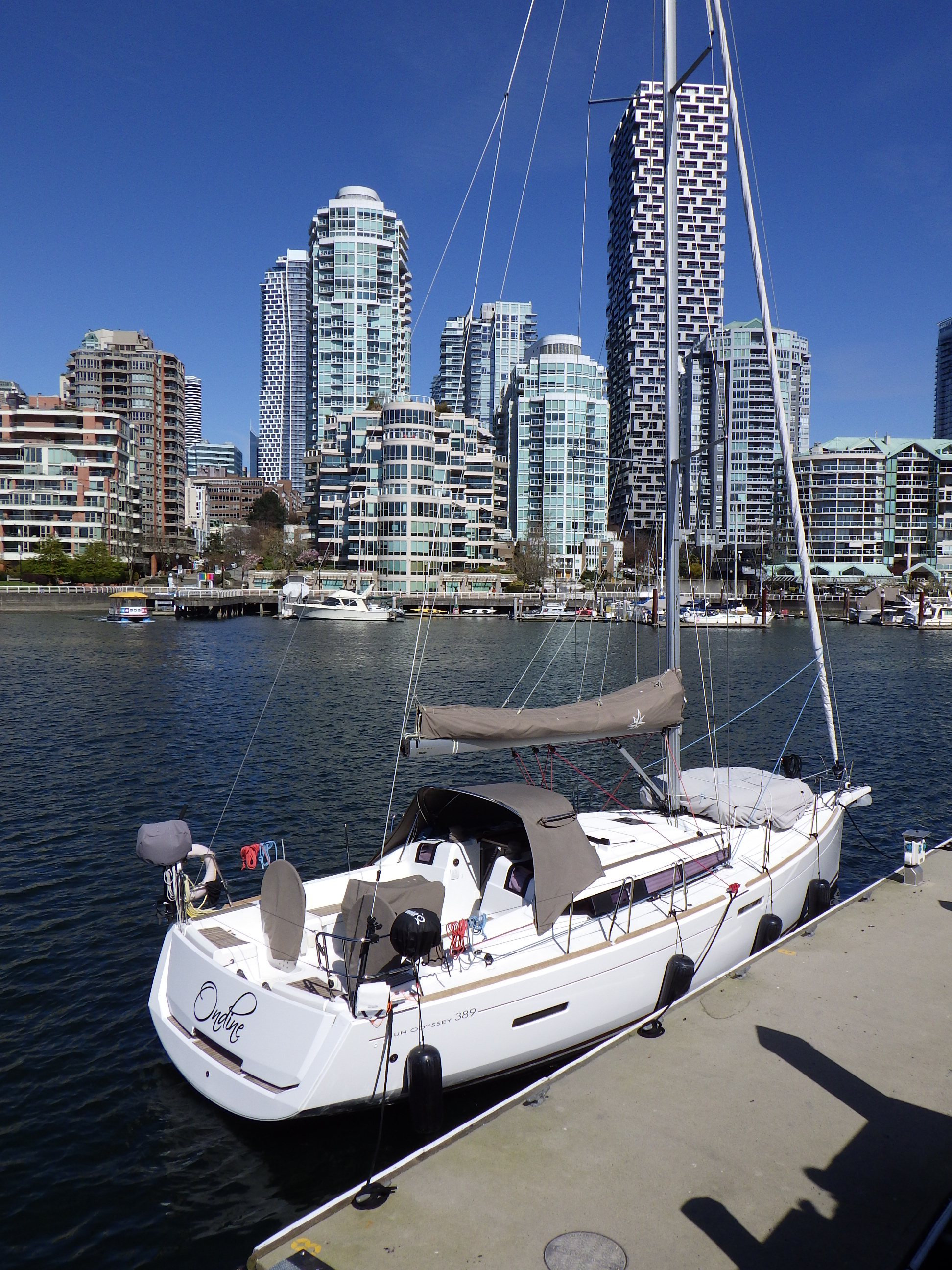
Jeanneau Sun Odyssey 389

The Sun Odyssey 389 is a recreational keelboat, built predominantly of fiberglass, with wood trim. It has a 9/10 fractional sloop rig with a bow sprit, with a deck-stepped mast, two sets of swept spreaders and aluminum spars with 1X19 stainless steel wire rigging. The hull has a plumb stem, a reverse transom with a drop-down tailgate, an internally mounted spade-type rudder controlled by dual wheels and a fixed L-shaped fin keel with a weighted bulb, optional shoal-draft keel or stub keel and fiberglass centerboard. The centerboard version has twin rudders.

The fin keel model displaces 14,771 lb (6,700 kg) empty and carries 3,913 lb (1,775 kg) of cast iron ballast, the shoal draft version displaces 14,771 lb (6,700 kg) empty and carries 4,495 lb (2,039 kg) of cast iron ballast and the centerboard version displaces 14,771 lb (6,700 kg) empty and carries 5,099 lb (2,313 kg) of exterior cast iron ballast.

The keel-equipped version of the boat has a draft of 6.50 ft (1.98 m), 4.92 ft (1.50 m) with the optional shoal draft keel, while the centerboard-equipped version has a draft of 7.33 ft (2.23 m) with the centerboard extended and 3.59 ft (1.09 m) with it retracted, allowing operation in shallow water.

The boat is fitted with a Japanese Yanmar diesel engine of 29 hp (22 kW) for docking and maneuvering. The fuel tank holds 34 U.S. gallons (130 L; 28 imp gal) and the fresh water tank has a capacity of 53 U.S. gallons (200 L; 44 imp gal).

The design was built in two and three-cabin interior arrangements. The two cabin version has sleeping accommodation for four people, with a double "V"-berth in the bow cabin, a U-shaped settee and a straight settee in the main cabin and an aft cabin with a double berth on the starboard side. The three cabin version adds a second aft cabin on the port side. The galley is located on the starboard side, just forward of the companionway ladder. The galley is L-shaped and is equipped with a two-burner stove, an ice box and a double sink. A navigation station is opposite the galley, on the port side. The head is located aft, on the port side and includes a shower. The three cabin version has a smaller head. Cabin maximum headroom is 76 in (193 cm).

For sailing downwind the design may be equipped with a symmetrical spinnaker of 1,066 sq ft (99.0 m^{2}), an asymmetrical spinnaker of 973 sq ft (90.4 m^{2}) or a Code 0 of 594 sq ft (55.2 m^{2}).

The design has a hull speed of 7.83 kn (14.50 km/h)

== Operational history ==
In a 2016 review for boats.com, Rupert Holmes wrote, "it's worth noting that the hull length is 10.98m (36ft 0in), so in common with designs from a number of other manufacturers, this boat is not as large as the model name might imply. Having said that, the generous beam, combined with accommodation pushed as much as possible into the ends of the boat, means there’s still a lot of space by 36ft standards. The saloon is of a generous size, as is the well appointed galley, which has ample worktop and stowage space, and there's a small aft-facing navigation station on the port side of the saloon."

== See also ==
- List of sailing boat types
