= Abbotsfield School for Boys =

Coordinates: 51.5372°N 0.4465°W

Location
- Sutton Court Road; Hillingdon, London Borough of Hillingdon, UB10 0EX; England

Information
- Type: Foundation school
- Opened: 1953
- Closed: 20 July 2017
- Local authority: Hillingdon
- Department for Education URN: 102449 Tables
- Ofsted: Reports
- Gender: Single-sex
- Age: 11 to 18
- Enrolment: 588 (2009)
- Website: www.oakwoodschool.uk

Abbotsfield School for Boys was an all-boys school in Hillingdon, West London. It closed on 20 July 2017, replaced on the site by the new co-ed Oak Wood School, which officially opened on 1 September 2017, under the same head teacher, Mark Bland.

== Notable pupils ==
Notable former pupils of the school include:

- Peter Bennett, West Ham footballer
- Russell Grant, astrologer
- Harry Harrison, cartoonist
- Barry King, Olympic decathlete
- Ian Mosley, drummer with Marillion
- Rowland Rivron, comedian
- Robert Thatcher, Olympic Rower
