= Bishop Ramsey School =

Bishop Ramsey Church of England School

Location
- Hume Way; Ruislip, Greater London, HA4 8EE; England; 51.5794°N 0.4090°W

Information
- Type: Academy
- Religious affiliation: Church of England
- Established: 1926; 100 years ago
- Department for Education URN: 137407 Tables
- Ofsted: Reports
- Interim Headteacher: Malcom Britton
- Gender: Coeducational
- Age: 11 to 18
- Houses: Rochester, St. Albans, Manchester, Salisbury, Exeter, York
- Website: http://www.bishopramseyschool.org/
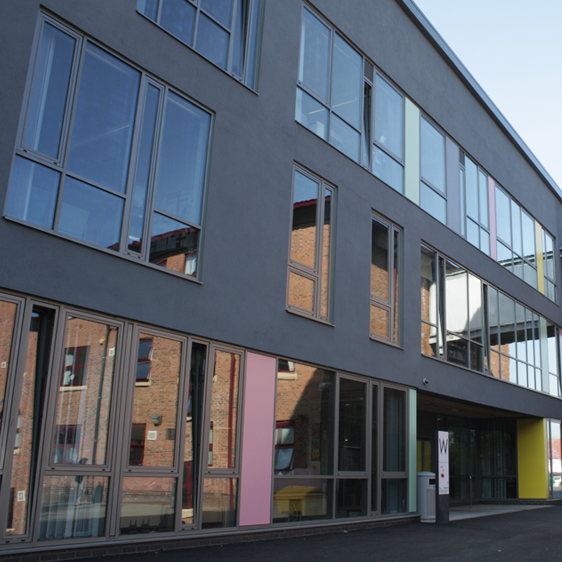
- The Main School Building Entrance

Bishop Ramsey School is a coeducational Church of England secondary school and sixth form with academy status, located in the Ruislip area of the London Borough of Hillingdon, England. The school is named after Bishop Ian Ramsey.

== History ==
Bishop Ramsey School was originally named Manor Secondary School which first opened in 1926. In 1977 it was renamed to 'Bishop Ramsey' when it merged with St. Martin's School in West Drayton. It was first located on at what used to be the Lower School site (Eastcote Road, Ruislip). The Lower School Site housed Years 7–9, and the Upper School Site housed Years 10-Sixth Form. In 2003, the school started construction to extend the Upper School to enable all students to enjoy the same range of facilities and opportunities. From April 2009, the school has been on the single site.

== Notable former pupils ==
- Natasha Baker, Paralympic Gold medalist
- Rhianne Barreto, actress
- Camilla George, musician
- Samantha Shannon, author of the novel series The Bone Season
- Steve Tuckwell, Conservative Member of Parliament
