= Ruislip =

Area of London, England

Coordinates: 51.576°N 0.433°W

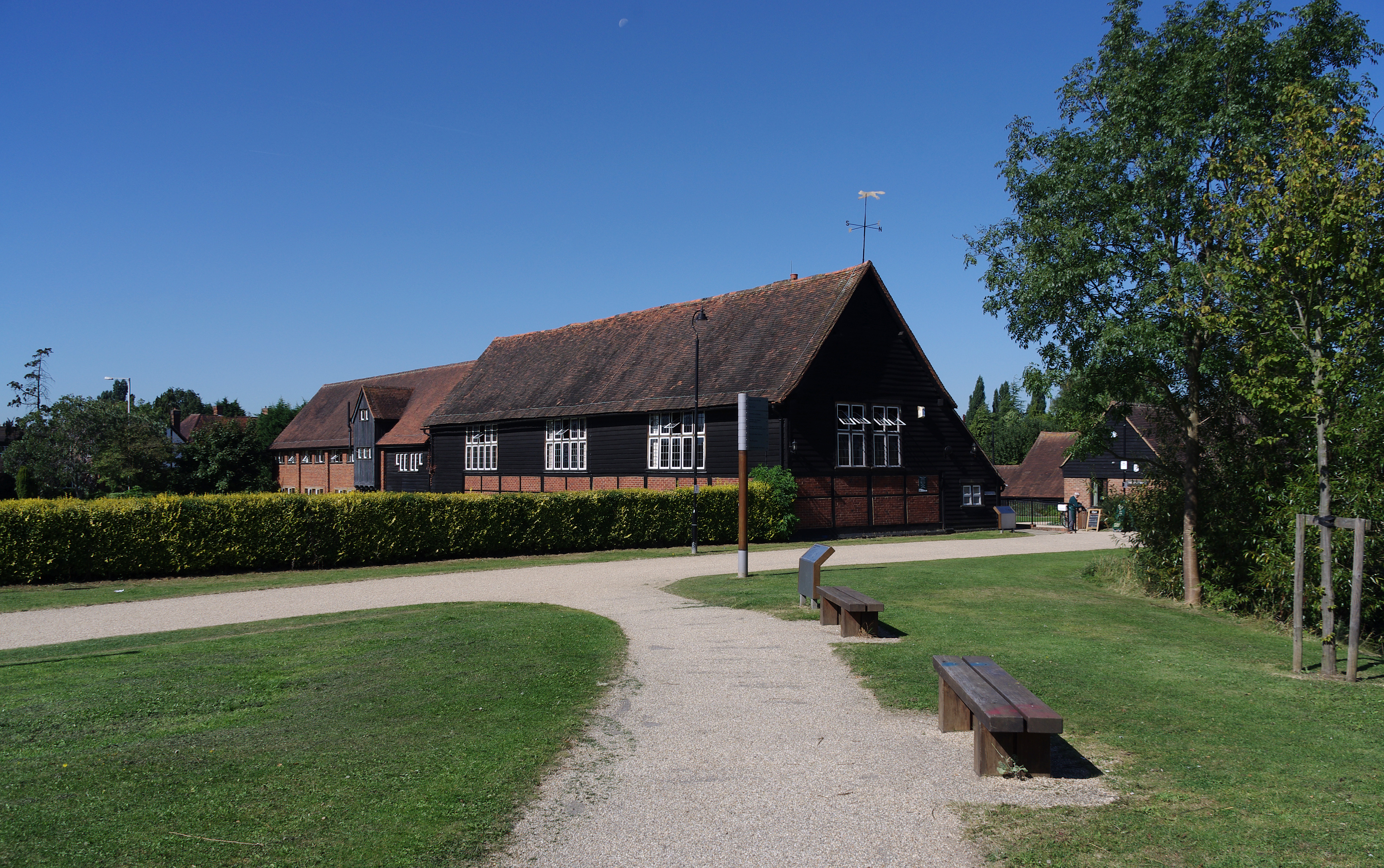
- Ruislip library at Manor Farm, Ruislip

- Location within Greater London
- Population: 58,217 (2011 Census
- OS grid reference: TQ0887
  - Charing Cross: 14 mi (23 km) ESE
- London borough: Hillingdon
- Ceremonial county: Greater London
- Region: London
- Country: England
- Sovereign state: United Kingdom
- Post town: RUISLIP
- Postcode district: HA4
- Dialling code: 01895
- Police: Metropolitan
- Fire: London
- Ambulance: London
- UK Parliament: Ruislip, Northwood and Pinner Uxbridge and South Ruislip
- London Assembly: Ealing and Hillingdon

Ruislip (/ˈraɪslɪp/ RY-slip) is a suburb in the Hillingdon borough of West London. Prior to 1965, it was in Middlesex. Ruislip lies 13.8 miles (22.2 km) west-north-west of Charing Cross.

The manor of Ruislip appears in the Domesday Book, and some of the earliest settlements still exist today, designated as local heritage sites. The parish church, St Martin's, dates back to the 13th century and remains in use. The buildings at the northern end of Ruislip High Street form the core of the original village square and are now Grade II listed. The High Street originally featured a central water pump, but this was moved out of the road in the 1970s as a result of increased traffic.

The expansion of the Metropolitan Railway from Harrow in the early 20th century acted as a catalyst for development in the area. Ruislip station opened in 1904, and a new urban district was created to reflect the forthcoming population growth; the Ruislip-Northwood Urban District split from the Uxbridge Rural District and continued until 1965, when Ruislip became part of the newly established London Borough of Hillingdon.

Major landmarks in the area include Ruislip Lido, a former reservoir, now an area of public parkland with its own miniature railway and Manor Farm, a settlement dating from the 9th century which is now designated as a local heritage site.

Ruislip is included within the Ruislip, Northwood and Pinner and Uxbridge and South Ruislip parliamentary constituencies and is covered by three electoral wards within the local council. As of the 2024 general election, Ruislip is represented by 1 Conservative MP and 1 Labour MP, with David Simmonds representing the former and Danny Beales representing the latter.

== History ==
=== Toponymy ===
At the time of Edward the Confessor, the manors of Ruislip and Ickenham belonged to Wulfward White, a thane of the king who owned land in 11 counties. Ruislip parish included what are now Ruislip, Northwood, Eastcote, Ruislip Manor and South Ruislip. Wulfward lost much of his land during the Norman conquest of England; Arnulf de Hesdin took control of Ruislip – his ownership is recorded within the 1086 Domesday Book.

Ruislip appears in Domesday Book as Rislepe, thought to mean 'leaping place on the river where rushes grow', in reference to the River Pinn. It is formed from the Old English 'rysc' and 'hlȳp'.

Translated from Latin, an entry reads:

M. Arnulf [Ernulf] of Hesdin holds Rislepe [Ruislip]. It is assessed for 30 hides. (Note: A hide was originally an amount of land suitable for supporting a household, but became a measure for assessing land for tax in Anglo-Saxon England.) Land for 20 ploughs. In lordship 11 hides; 3 ploughs there. There are 12 ploughs between the Frenchmen and the villagers; a further 5 possible.

A priest, ½ hide; 2 villagers with 1 hide; 17 villagers, 1 virgate (Note: A virgate was a unit of land area measurement used in medieval England, and was held to be the amount of land that a team of two oxen could plough in a single annual season.) each; 10 villagers, ½ virgate each; 7 smallholders, 4 acres each; 8 cottagers; 4 slaves; 4 Frenchmen with 3 hides and 1 virgate.

Pasture for the village livestock; a park for woodland beasts; woodland, 1500 pigs, and 20d too.

Total value £20; when acquired £12; before 1066 £30.

Wulfward White, a thane of King Edward's, held this manor; he could sell it to whom he would.

Under Edward the Confessor, Ruislip had been valued at £30, though the reduction to £12 by the time Ernulf de Hesdin took possession is believed to have been caused by a passing unit of the Norman Army taking crops. This led to the construction of buildings at Manor Farm to protect produce.

Before leaving England to fight in the Holy Lands, Ernulf de Hesdin gave ownership of Ruislip to the Benedictine Bec Abbey in 1087. He died fighting and is commemorated in annual masses held in June at Sacred Heart Church and on the remains of the motte-and-bailey at Manor Farm.

It was an ancient parish in the historic county of Middlesex, part of the hundred of Elthorne.

=== Early developments ===
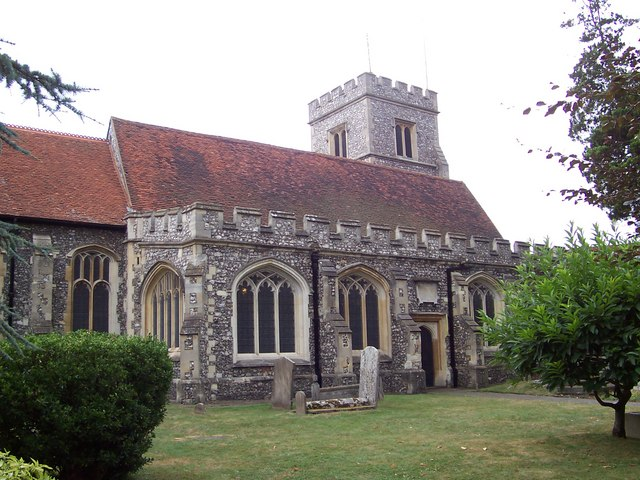
St Martin's Church was built in the 13th century.

The parish church, St Martin's, has been dated to the mid-13th century. An earlier church is believed to have been built during the Norman period, as a stone was found within the grounds with markings from that time. The name St. Martin is believed to have been given to the church by the monks of the Bec Abbey, after Martin of Tours, a saint in Normandy. Before 1245, references to the church only name it as "Ruislip church".

The present church is said to have been built upon the insistence of the Proctor-General, William de Guineville, under the ownership of Bec Abbey, to serve the growing population. He used the priory at Manor Farm as his main residence The first recorded vicar was William de Berminton in 1327. The building itself has been remodelled in parts over the centuries and was substantially restored by George Gilbert Scott in 1870. It received Grade B listed status as an Anglican church in 1950, corresponding as Grade II.

Under the ownership of the Bec Abbey, timber from the woods around Ruislip – Park Wood, Mad Bess Wood and Copse Wood – was used in the construction of the Tower of London in 1339, Windsor Castle in 1344, the Palace of Westminster in 1346 and the manor of the Black Prince in Kennington. The woods were coppiced on rotation throughout the years with the timber sold to local tanneries. By the time King's College took ownership of the manor, the woods were let for sport, with pheasants kept for shooting.

=== Urban development ===
In 1812, Bishop Winnington Ingram School was established by the vestry of St Martin's church in Eastcote Road. The school had 111 pupils by 1845 but fell into a state of disrepair until its rebuilding in 1931.

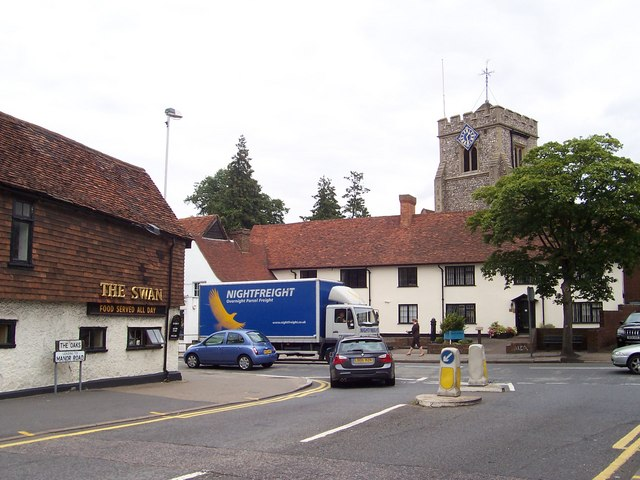
Looking towards St Martin's Church from the Oaks

Ruislip came under the jurisdiction of the Metropolitan Police in 1845. By 1869, the police were renting a house in the High Street to serve as the local police station, the copyhold of which was purchased in 1873. A new station was built in The Oaks in 1961.

In 1863, the White Bear public house came under the ownership of the Harman's Brewery in Uxbridge. It had been built close to Primrose Hill Farm near the junction of the Ickenham Road and Kings End. Kings End was a hamlet, with one building dating back to the 16th century. It was named after a family who had lived there at that time.

A well was sunk in 1864 in the High Street at the junction with Bury Street, constructed by Mr Charles Page from Uxbridge. The first 15-foot (4.6 m) were dug, before 90.75-foot (27.66 m) was bored through the London clay and the final 30-foot (9.1 m) was cut through chalk. A drought in 1898 led to the parish council requesting a well be created on what are now the Pinn Meadows, to make use of the natural spring there. The Colne River Water Company agreed, upon the guarantee of £45 per year, and the service was established.

A report had been prepared for the parish council in 1903 which noted the population in Northwood – 2,700 by that time, with 530 houses – compared with the largely rural character of the rest of Ruislip parish. At a meeting of the Ruislip parish council on 28 October 1903, the forthcoming extension of the Metropolitan Railway from Harrow on the Hill to Uxbridge was also discussed as it was known that a station would be opened in Ruislip on the new line. Councillors were also aware that King's College, Cambridge, owners of much of the land in the parish and lords of the manor, were planning to sell some for development. With this in mind, a vote was cast which went in favour of becoming an urban district. The new district was designed to better reflect to increase in development, as councillors felt a parish council would work slower than an urban district.

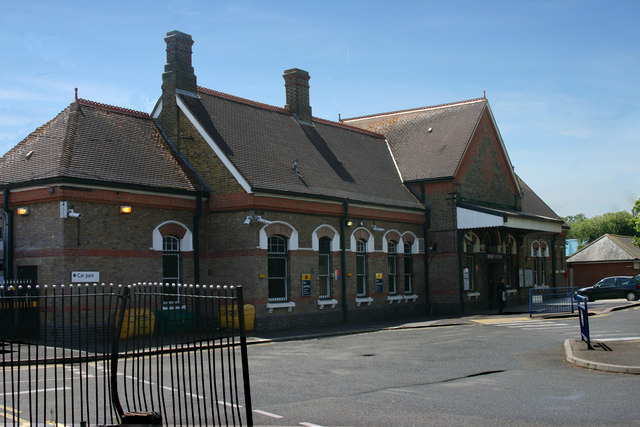
Railway station opened on 4 July 1904.

The first train on the new railway line ran on 30 June 1904, and the new station at Ruislip opened on 4 July. The area became popular with ramblers, who would head to the Ruislip Lido, and general day-trippers who sought out the countryside. Local residents in Ruislip established their own tea gardens, which they advertised for the visitors. In particular, the Poplars, a Georgian house built in 1774 on the corner of the High Street and Ickenham Road, opened a tea garden in the grounds. It was eventually demolished in 1929 to make way for shops. A similar establishment was opened in light of the new railway on the corner of Sharps Lane, known as the Orchard Bungalow. It was eventually expanded and became The Orchard Hotel.

The new urban district was formed on 30 September 1904, covering the parish, which had previously been part of the Uxbridge Rural District. At the time the parish incorporated Ruislip Manor, South Ruislip, Eastcote and Northwood. The new urban district council held its first meeting at Northwood School on 1 October, the day after forming.

King's End was developed as a residential road in the early 1900s. By 1907, the first of the new homes were completed and residents began to move into them. The road was named King's End Avenue, though reverted to the original name of King's End later in the century.

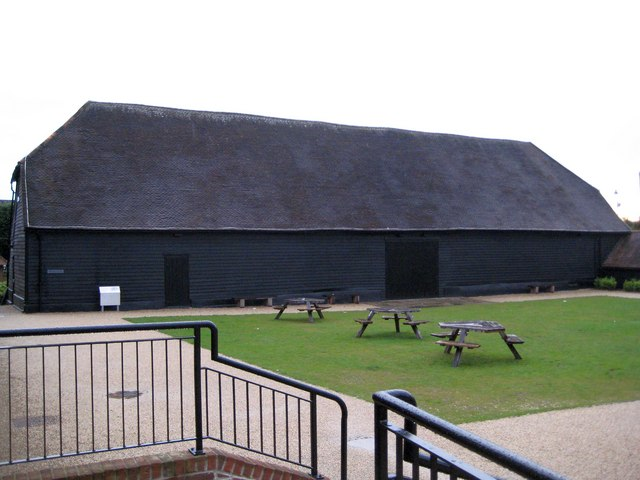
Great Barn was built around 1280.

The district experienced a sharp rise in population, from 6,217 in 1911 to 72,791 in 1961, caused by the extension of the Metropolitan Railway, termed Metro-land, which brought with it an increase in suburban house building. As a consequence, the district was one of the first in England to devise a statutory planning scheme in 1914, following the Housing, Town Planning, etc. Act 1909. The council had been prompted to follow this new act by the chairman of the council, Mr. Elgood, an architect, and the clerk to the council, Mr. Abbot. Members of the council had already raised concerns over some of the new building work around Eastcote and South Ruislip, and the new development near Northwood station which they described as "badly arranged and closely-packed".

Together with King's College, the urban district council worked to establish plots of land for development around Ruislip and Ruislip Manor. A town planning competition was held and A & J Soutar from Wandsworth won. They plan to create a symmetrical design spreading across Ruislip parish. Many of the woods and historic sites including Manor Farm were to be demolished and cleared as part of the plan, making way for a projected total of 7,642 homes, enough for 35,000 residents. Only St. Martin's Church would have been spared. An outline map was made public on 30 November 1910 with few objections recorded. A Local Board inquiry followed on 17 February 1911 which required negotiations with landowners to allow for a full planning scheme to be compiled. This was presented in February 1913 with an adaptation of the original Soutars plan, receiving approval from the Local Government Board in September 1914. Three roads with residential housing, Manor Way, Windmill Way and Park Way were completed before the outbreak of the First World War when all construction work was halted. It did not resume until 1919.

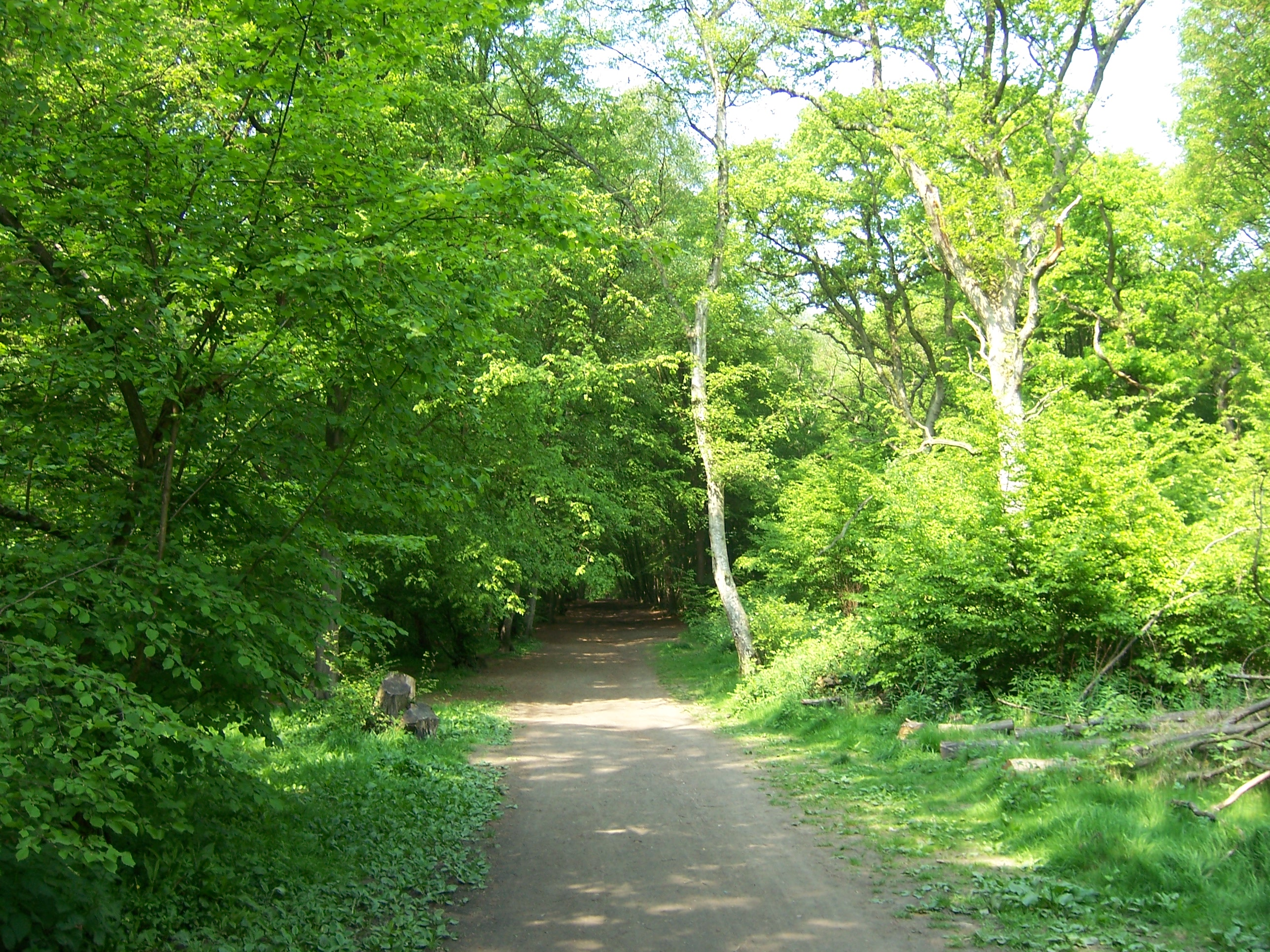
Park Wood and Manor Farm were bought by the local council in 1931.

Manor Farm and the local woods eventually avoided demolition in January 1930, after the visit by a member of the Royal Society of Arts to choose the buildings that should be conserved. The Great Barn and Little Barn were singled out from the site, together with the old post office, the Old Bell public house and the Priest's House of the local church. The woods were included in a sale by King's College to the district in February 1931. Park Wood was sold for £28,100 with Manor Farm and the old post office included as a gift to the people of Ruislip. King's had wished to also present the wood as a gift but was required by the University and Colleges Act to receive payment as it was the trustee of the land. Middlesex County Council contributed 75% of the cost as the urban district council argued that many of those who would make use of the land would be recreational day-trippers from outside the district. Under a 999-year lease, the council agreed to maintain the wood and ensure no new building was constructed without the permission of the county council. An area of the wood to the south was not included in the lease agreement and three residential roads were later constructed on it.

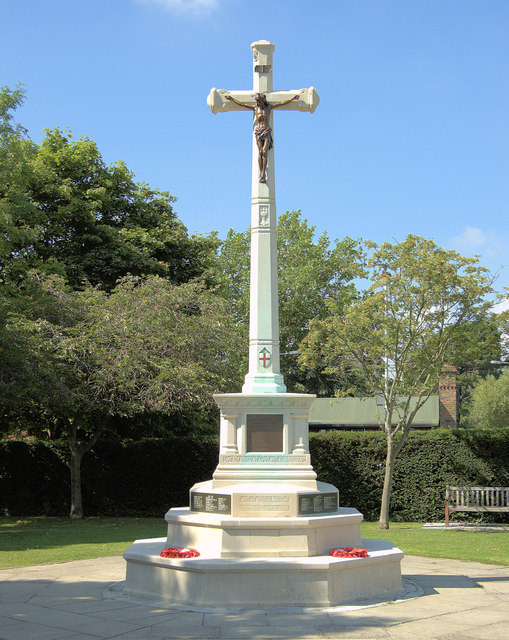
Ruislip War Memorial moved to its present position in 1976.

Copse Wood was later purchased by Middlesex County Council and London County Council in 1936 for £23,250, later joined by Mad Bess Wood in the same year. The urban district council purchased the 186 acres (75 ha) wood together with Middlesex and London County Councils for £28,000 in a compulsory purchase from Sir Howard Stransom Button. Sir Howard became High Sheriff of Middlesex in 1937.

On 19 December 1946 a Railway Air Services Dakota 3 airliner taking-off from Northolt Aerodrome crashed into a house in Angus Drive, Ruislip, fortunately with no serious injuries to anyone, either in the aircraft or on the ground.

On 6 January 1948 a British European Airways Vickers VC.1 Viking flying from Renfrew Airport to RAF Northolt crashed in a ploughed field approximately five miles from the runway. The crew had tried to land the aircraft twice unsuccessfully when the aircraft struck a tree on the third approach attempt. Of the 18 passengers and crew on board, one crew member was killed in the crash.

In 1961, the Portland spy ring was uncovered. Peter and Helen Kroger were found to have been involved whilst living in Ruislip. They were visited each Saturday evening by Gordon Lonsdale and were eventually placed under police surveillance. The Krogers were eventually arrested and found to have codes, a microdot reader and film of the Admiralty Underwater Weapons Establishment in Portland Harbour concealed within ordinary household items. A radio transmitter hidden in the garden was not retrieved until 1977.

Primrose Hill Farm was demolished to make way for housing in 1965. Field End Farm, covering 50 acres (20 ha) at the junction of Wood Lane and West End Road, was demolished in 1966. The farmhouse had been owned by the manor of Northolt under the name of Berrengers. Bishop Winnington Ingram School moved to Southcote Rise in 1968 and the original school building was demolished. In 1976, the war memorial dedicated to those killed during the First World War was moved from the graveyard of St Martin's to the entrance of Manor Farm. Bury Street Farm near the Plough was demolished in 1980.

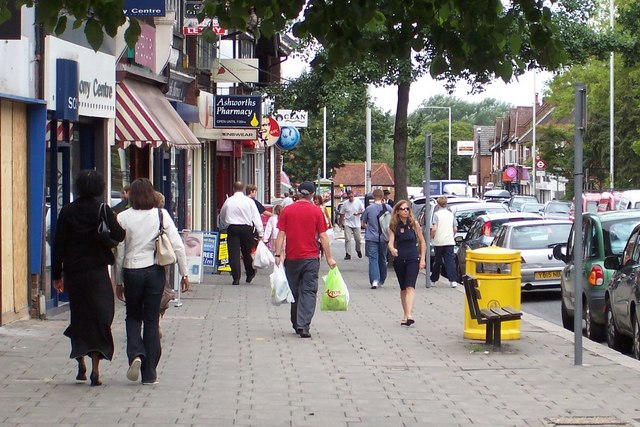
High Street, 2006

In 1984, the Battle of Britain House, built within Copse Wood in 1905, was destroyed by fire and the ruins demolished. The house became a college in 1948 and included plaques with the crests of all Royal Air Force squadrons involved in the Battle of Britain as a memorial.

In April 2007, restoration work began on the Manor Farm site using funding from the Heritage Lottery Fund. The work was completed in June the following year, and included the renovation of the Grade II listed library. The Duck Pond Market began in the Great Barn in December 2008, following the refurbishment, and runs on the first and third Sunday of every month. Winston Churchill Hall on the site received a £370,000 grant from Hillingdon Council in March 2011 to enable its refurbishment.

== Demographics ==
Ethnic composition (East Ruislip Ward, 2001)
White British & Irish	84.5%
White Other	4.3%
Asian	6%
Black	1%
Mixed	1%
Other	1%
Total White	90%
Total Ethnic Minority	10%

Ethnic composition (West Ruislip Ward, 2001)
White British & Irish	84.8%
White Other	5.6%
Asian	5%
Black	2%
Mixed	2%
Other	2%
Total White	90%
Total Ethnic Minority	10%

Ethnic composition (West Ruislip Ward, 2011)
White British & Irish	76.7%
White Other	5.7%
Asian	10%
Black	2%
Mixed	4%
Other	2%
Total White	82%
Total Ethnic Minority	18%

Ethnic composition (East Ruislip Ward, 2011)
White British & Irish	74.7%
White Other	5.0%
Asian	14%
Black	2%
Mixed	3%
Other	1%
Total White	80%
Total Ethnic Minority	20%

Ethnic composition (Ruislip Merged Ward, 2021)
White British & Irish	66%
White Other	9%
Asian	16%
Black	2%
Mixed	5%
Other	3%
Total White	74%
Total Ethnic Minority	26%

== Local government ==
Ruislip formed an ancient parish of 6,585 acres (26.65 km^{2}) in the Elthorne hundred of Middlesex. Following the Poor Law Amendment Act 1834, the parish lost control of poor relief to Uxbridge Poor Law Union and it was grouped into the Uxbridge rural sanitary district in 1875. In 1894 the sanitary district was replaced by Uxbridge Rural District and the parish vestry was replaced with a parish council. Due to increasing population, the parish split off from the rural district and formed the Ruislip-Northwood Urban District, with the parish council replaced by an urban district council. The urban district was abolished in 1965 and was transferred to Greater London to form part of the newly established London Borough of Hillingdon.

Within the London Borough of Hillingdon, Ruislip is covered by three electoral wards: Eastcote, Ruislip and South Ruislip. Ruislip is part of the Ruislip, Northwood and Pinner and Uxbridge and South Ruislip constituencies within the UK Parliament, represented since 2024 by David Simmonds and Danny Beales, respectively. From 2015 to his resignation in 2023, former Prime Minister Boris Johnson was a previous MP for Uxbridge and South Ruislip.

== Education ==
Primary schools in Ruislip include Bishop Winnington Ingram Church of England Primary School, Lady Bankes Infant School, Lady Bankes Junior School, Warrender Primary School, Whiteheath Infant School, and Whiteheath Junior School.

Secondary schools include Bishop Ramsey School, and Ruislip High School.

== Sports clubs ==
Ruislip is represented by the non-League football club Hillingdon Borough F.C., which plays at the Middlesex Stadium. The non-league club Wealdstone FC is based at the Grosvenor Vale Stadium, although the club is originally from Harrow and have been based in Ruislip since 2008.

Grosvenor Vale Stadium also played host to Ruislip Manor F.C. between 1938 and 2008, before the non-league club folded following a period of financial uncertainty during its latter two trading years.

Ruislip Rugby Club is based in West End Road and was formed in 1954, succeeding an earlier club from around 1950. The club's ground is at West End Road in Ruislip.

Ruislip Cricket Club is situated in the town on Kings College Road. They were founded in 1959, currently hosting Two Teams in the Thames Valley Cricket League. Also on Kings College Road, Ruislip Rangers Football Club are the largest youth football club in the county of Middlesex.

Ruislip Golf Course, on Ickenham Road, was opened in 1922, and is operated by a private company on behalf of the London Borough of Hillingdon. Ruislip is also the home of Eastcote Hockey Club, based at Kings College playing fields. The club was originally based in Eastcote, from where it took its name, but moved to the present location in 1964.

== Transport ==
=== London Underground ===
Stations in the area:

- Ruislip station (Metropolitan line & Piccadilly line)
- Ruislip Gardens station (Central line)
- Ruislip Manor station (Metropolitan line & Piccadilly line)
- South Ruislip station (Central line and Chiltern Railways)
- West Ruislip station (Central line & Chiltern Railways)

=== Buses ===
London Buses serving Ruislip are:

Route	Start	End	Operator
114	Mill Hill Broadway station	Ruislip	Metroline
278	Ruislip station	Heathrow Central bus station	Transport UK London Bus
331	Ruislip	Uxbridge	Metroline
398	Ruislip	Wood End	London Sovereign
696	Bishop Ramsey School	Hayes	London United
E7	Ruislip	Ealing Broadway	Transport UK London Bus
H13	Ruislip Lido	Northwood Hills	Metroline
U1	Ruislip	West Drayton	Metroline
U10	Uxbridge	Ruislip	Metroline

== Landmarks ==
=== Village square ===
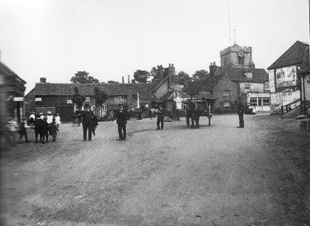
The original Ruislip Village in 1907, looking towards St. Martin's Church with the Duck House to the left.

The buildings at the north end of Ruislip High Street, Nos 1 to 15, the Duck House restaurant and the Swan public house, which has since been operated as Cafe Rouge, form the core of the original village and are Grade II listed. This area formed the village square, at the junction of the High Street, Bury Street and Eastcote Road. The village water pump was sunk in the centre of the square in 1864, to a depth of 105 feet (32 m) 9 inches (230 mm), though was moved to be beside the Manor Farm Lodge in the 1970s. It was moved again in 1982 to sit outside 7–15 High Street.

=== Manor Farm ===
To the north of Ruislip High Street, the 22 acres (8.9 ha) Manor Farm site incorporates the remains of settlements dating back to the 9th century, as well as buildings including the Great Barn, dated by English Heritage as having been built around 1280. A working farm until the 1930s, the farm was let by King's College, Cambridge, the owners of the land from 1500 to the mid 20th century. It has been designated as a local heritage site and was refurbished between 2007 and 2008 with funding from the Heritage Lottery Fund.

=== Ruislip Lido ===
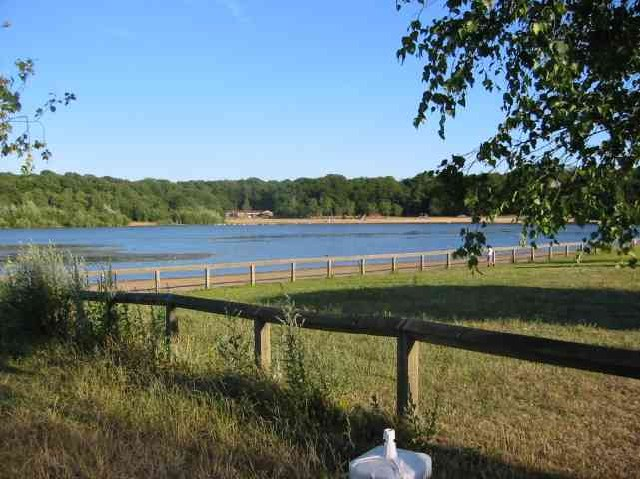
View across Ruislip Lido

Ruislip Lido is a nineteenth century reservoir with an artificial sand beach, surrounded by woodlands through which runs the Ruislip Lido Railway, a miniature 12" gauge railway with diesel and steam locomotives. The lido was established as a reservoir to feed the Grand Union Canal by damming and flooding the lower part of the valley between Park Wood and Copse Wood, including the hamlet of Park Hearn. Work began in 1811; the consulting engineer John Rennie announced completion of the project to the Grand Junction Waterworks Company on 5 December that year. Unsuccessful as a canal feeder lake, it was reconstructed as a pleasure resort in 1933.

=== Orchard Hotel ===
Following the extension of the Metropolitan Railway to Ruislip, and the resulting influx of visitors to the area, Albert Cross built a bungalow from where teas were served to day-trippers. This became a success and Cross had the building expanded, which soon became the Orchard Hotel. Between 1933 and 1971 it became an Ansells licensed bar and well known high class restaurant. It then became a Berni Inn then Beefeater restaurant, which it remains, and was recently extended with a Premier Inn hotel. During the Battle of Britain, the Orchard was very popular with the pilots of No. 303 Polish Fighter Squadron stationed at RAF Northolt, who celebrated many of their successes in battle there. The owner was known to open a bottle of champagne for each German aircraft shot down by the squadron.

== Notable people ==
- Optical mineralogist Stuart Olof Agrell (1913–1996) was born in Ruislip.
- Mary Bankes (c. 1598–1661), Royalist figure of the Royal Pharmaceutical Society, lived in Ruislip. Lady Bankes Infant and Junior School is named after her.
- Experimental musician Paul Burwell (1949–2007) was born in Ruislip.
- Conn Iggulden (born 1961), author, attended Sacred Heart Roman Catholic Primary.
- Poet Peter Levi (1931–2000) was born in Ruislip.
- Actress Lana Morris (1930–1998) was born in Ruislip.
- Choral director and television song composer Fred Tomlinson (1927-2016) lived in Walnut Way.
- Actress Jessie Matthews (1907–1981) lived in Ruislip in the early 1960s.
- Actor Simon Fisher-Becker (born 1961) grew up in Ruislip.
- Indie pop band Scouting for Girls grew up and formed in Ruislip. Founding members Roy Stride and Peter Ellard met at 1/3rd Ruislip Cub Scout Group. Roy Stride met Bass player Greg Churchouse at Queensmead School.

== In popular culture ==
Ruislip was the setting for the 1967 film Poor Cow. In one scene, a title card states "When Tom was in the money, the world was our oyster, and we chose Ruislip" before cutting to an aerial view of a large council estate.

The now demolished Punch and Judy cafe on Ducks Hill Road was the location for Dave Allen's bank note under a car sketch.

Alvin Stardust filmed a Green Cross Code advert on Ruislip High Street. This safety film dates from circa 1976.

The children's TV programme Come Outside features Ruislip Manor library in the edition called Buses.

Episode 7 of series 7 of The Two Ronnies featured a sketch titled "Home Rule for Ruislip". The sketch features Ronnie Barker dressed as a Viking taking on the role of chief spokesmen.

Author Leslie Thomas alluded to Ruislip in a novel entitled Tropic of Ruislip.

== See also ==
- List of schools in Hillingdon

== Bibliography ==
- Bowlt, Eileen. M. (1994) Ruislip Past. London: Historical Publications ISBN 0-948667-29-X
- Bowlt, Eileen. M. (2007) Around Ruislip, Eastcote, Northwood, Ickenham & Harefield. Stroud: Sutton Publishing ISBN 978-0-7509-4796-1
- Bristow, Mark. (2005) A History of Royal Air Force Northolt. RAF Northolt: No. 1 AIDU
- Mills, A. D. (2001) Oxford Dictionary of London Place Names. Oxford University Press ISBN 0-19-280106-6
- Morris, John. (1975) Domesday Book 11: Middlesex. Chichester: Phillimore ISBN 0-85033-131-5
- Newbery, Maria; Cotton, Carolynne; Packham, Julie Ann; Jones, Gwyn. (1996) Around Ruislip. Stroud: The Chalfont Publishing Company ISBN 0-7524-0688-4
