= Oak Wood School =

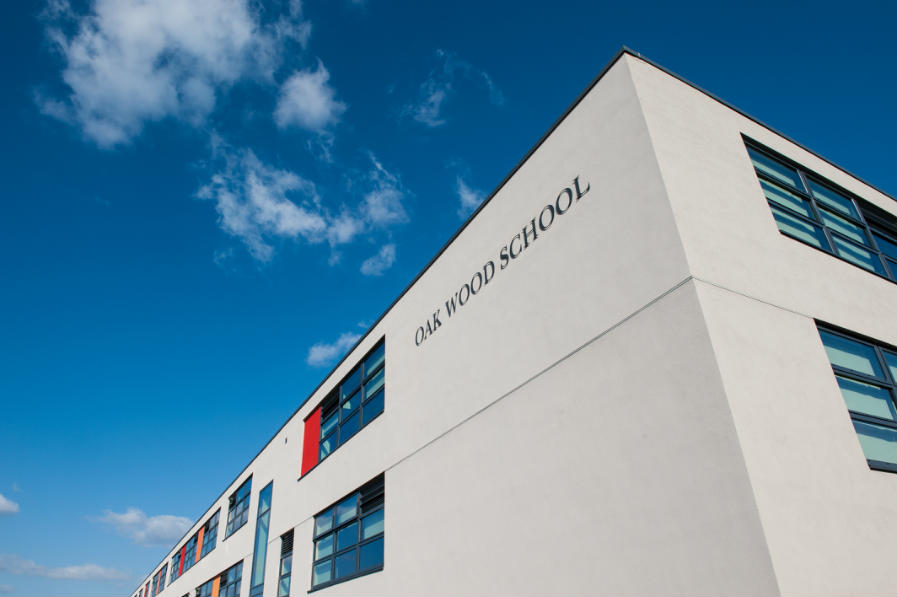
- The Main School Building, opened in 2018

Location
- Sutton Court Road; Hillingdon, Greater London, UB10 9HT; England; 51.5394°N 0.4447°W

Information
- Former name: Abbotsfield School for Boys
- Type: Foundation school
- Established: 2017; 9 years ago
- Sister school: Swakeleys School for Girls
- Department for Education URN: 102449 Tables
- Ofsted: Reports
- Headteacher: Daniel Cowling
- Gender: Coeducational
- Age: 11 to 18
- Capacity: 1350
- Colors: Green; Yellow; Purple (Sixth Form)
- Website: www.oakwoodschool.uk

Oak Wood School (formerly Abbotsfield School for Boys) is a coeducational secondary school with a sixth form, in the London Borough of Hillingdon, England. The school was rated 'Good' in its most recent Ofsted inspection. It shares a site with the Swakeleys School for Girls.

== History ==
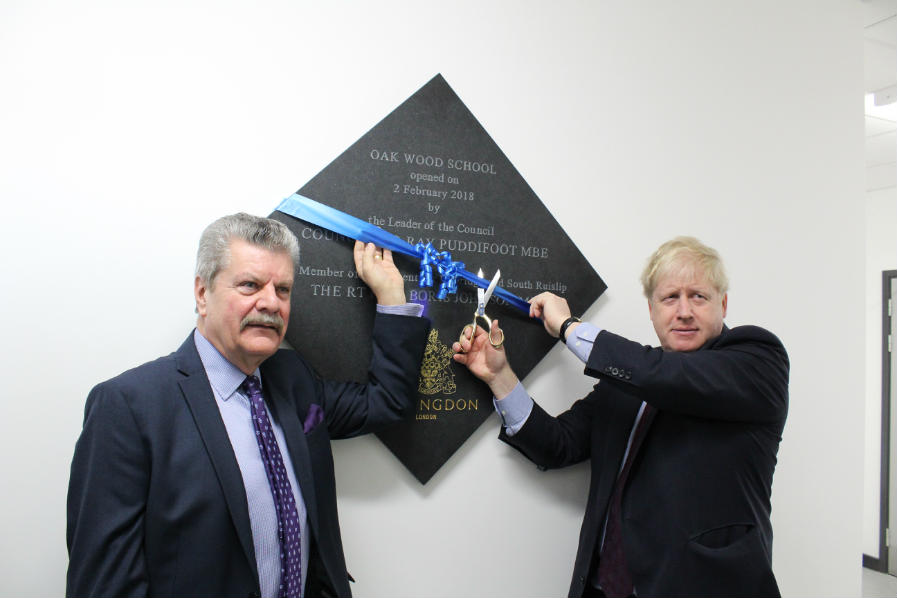
Cllr Ray Puddifoot, Leader of the Council for Hillingdon, and Boris Johnson, MP for Uxbridge and South Ruislip, unveil a plaque for the opening of Oak Wood School.

The original school, Abbotsfield School for Boys, was established on Clifton Gardens in 1953. The Abbotsfield and Swakeleys schools consisted of fourteen one- to two-storey blocks dating from the 1950s to 2005 and shared one site.

The old school was renamed on 20 July 2018 and was relaunched as co-educational under the name Oak Wood School. The original closing date was put as 2016, though this was delayed in order to allow building works to be completed on the site. The old school buildings were used until the new facility was opened, at which point the old buildings were demolished, with the same happening to Swakeleys School's buildings. The new building works for both Abbotsfield and Swakeleys were funded by the London Borough of Hillingdon. The reason cited for Abbotsfield's re-opening as co-ed was due to the school's low admission rates and performance.

The school moved into its new building in January 2018. On 2 February 2018, Ray Puddifoot, Leader of the Hillingon Council, and Boris Johnson, MP for Uxbridge and South Ruislip attended alongside headteacher Mark Bland. The pair unveiled a plaque in the school's entrance hall. Cllr Ray Puddifoot was a former pupil of the school.

The new school building has purpose-built drama and music areas, 4-court sports hall and external sports courts, dance studio, increasing the number of school places by 375. A vocaThe school has specially resourced provision for pupils with SEND.

The school has now reached 'Good' status in 2022 under the current headteacher, Daniel Cowling.

=== Headteachers ===
- Daniel Cowling (current)
- Gilly Hare
- Mark Bland (under Oak Wood and Abbotsfield)
- David Henderson (under Abbotsfield)
- Robert Preston (under Abbotsfield)

== Academia ==
The house groups are as follows:

- Turing - Red
- Hawking - Blue
- Pankhurst - Yellow
- Yousafzai - Green

The first three houses were chosen by the school's student council in 2016/17. Yousafzai was chosen in 2022 as a fourth house.
