= Swakeleys School for Girls =

Secondary school in London

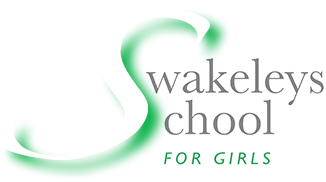

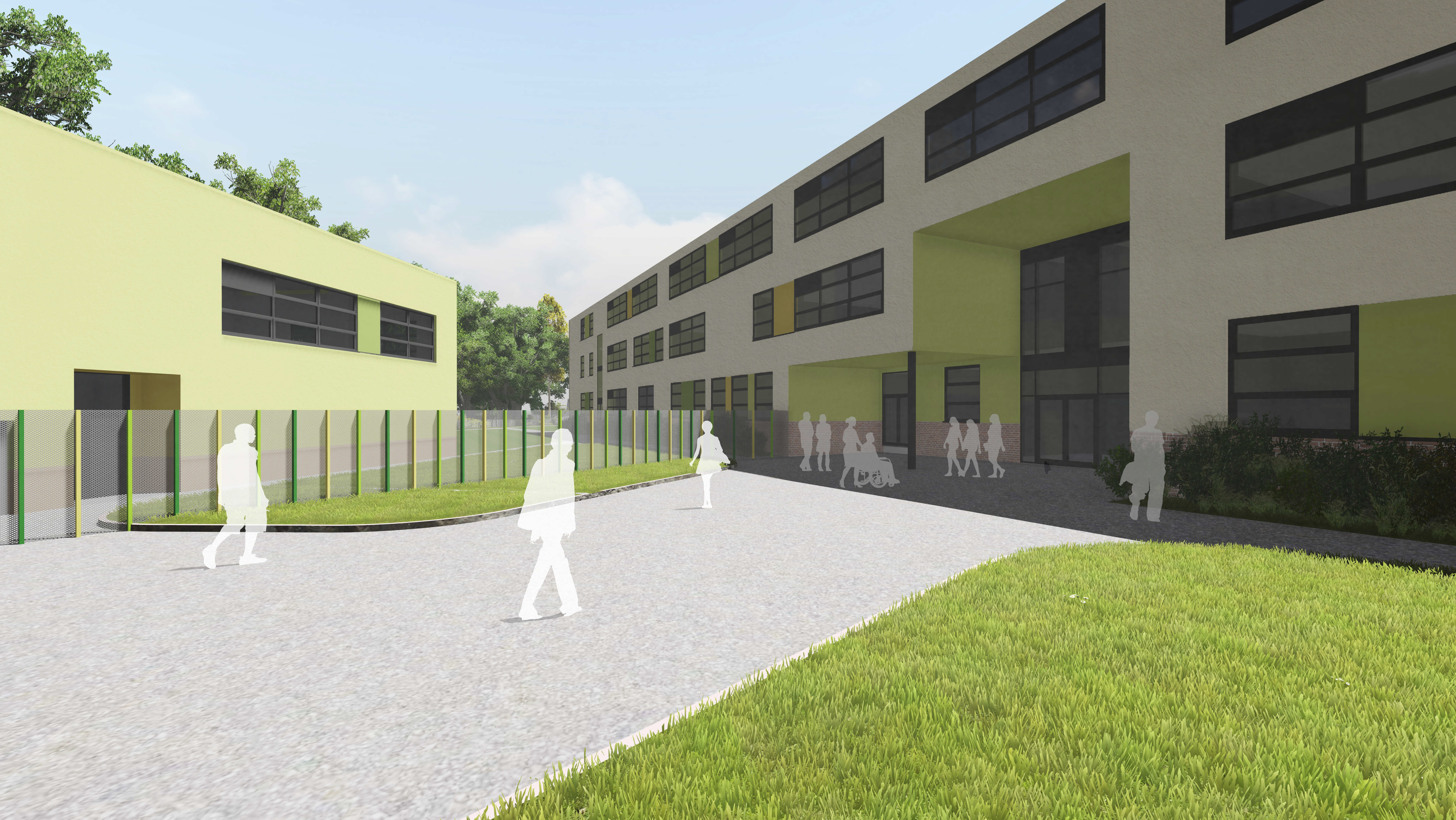

Location
- Clifton Gardens; Hillingdon, Greater London, UB1 1LR; England
- Coordinates: 51°32′16″N 0°26′47″W

Information
- Type: Academy
- Motto: Enjoy, Achieve, Aspire, Succeed
- Department for Education URN: 136631 Tables
- Ofsted: Reports
- Headteacher: Kelda Stevenson
- Gender: Girls
- Age: 11 to 18
- Enrolment: 1,132 as of January 2015
- Houses: FN, RP, MY, MC, DS, JA, EB, AF
- Website: Official website

Swakeleys School for Girls is a secondary school and sixth form for girls located in the Hillingdon area of the London Borough of Hillingdon, England. It is the only girls' school in the borough and used to share a site with Abbotsfield School for Boys in Clifton Gardens, until it was rebuilt in 2017, and reformed into the unisex Oak Wood School. After the closure of Abbotsfield School, Swakeleys School became the only single-sex school in the London Borough of Hillingdon.

The school was converted to academy status on 1 April 2011 and was previously a Foundation School administered by Hillingdon London Borough Council. The school continues to coordinate with Hillingdon London Borough Council for admissions.

The school offers GCSEs and BTECs as programmes of study for pupils. while students in the sixth form have the option to study from a range of A Levels and further BTECs. The school specialises in humanities and has additional resources to support the specialism.

== Notable staff ==
Emma Croker, an international rugby union player, led the physical education department.
