= Wood End Park Academy =

Location
- Judge Heath Lane; Hayes, Greater London, UB3 2PD; England; 51.5177°N 0.4385°W

Information
- Type: Academy
- Department for Education URN: 138621 Tables
- Ofsted: Reports
- Head teacher: Mr Luke Richmond
- Gender: Coeducational
- Age: 4 to 11
- Website: http://www.woodendpark.hillingdon.sch.uk/

Wood End Park Academy is a primary school with academy status in Hayes, Hillingdon. It is part of the Park Federation Academy Trust, along with Cranford Park Academy.

== History ==
Wood End Park Junior Mixed and Infants school was opened in 1930. During World War II, dogfights from the Battle of Britain could be seen from the school's playing fields.

== Ethnic diversity ==
Wood End Park Academy serves a multicultural community, with the proportion of pupils coming from minority ethnic backgrounds being far higher than average. Less than a third are White British, with the largest ethnic groups being Somali, Black African and Asian Indian.
