= UTC Heathrow =

Location
- Potter St; Northwood, Greater London, HA6 1QG; England; 51.6037°N 0.4060°W

Information
- Type: University Technical College
- Established: 1 September 2014
- Trust: Activate Learning Education Trust
- Department for Education URN: 146375 Tables
- Ofsted: Reports
- Principal: Wayne Edwards
- Gender: Coeducational
- Age: 14 to 19
- Enrolment: 191 As of April 2021
- Capacity: 600
- Rebrokered: September 2018
- Previous URN: 140941
- Website: http://www.heathrow-utc.org/

UTC Heathrow (formerly Heathrow Aviation Engineering UTC) is a University Technical College located in Northwood, in the London Borough of Hillingdon, England. It opened in September 2014 and is located next door to Northwood School.

== History ==
It opened in 2014 and failed to submit adequate accounts. It was served with a notice to improve by the Education Funding Agency in August 2016, due to an "apparent loss of financial control".

The school, trading under the former name, Heathrow Aviation Engineering UTC, was inspected by Ofsted in February 2017 and was judged to require improvement in every category.

== Building ==
The 4,500sqm building cost £10 million. It has been designed with sustainable features such as solar panels, and carbon emissions are 25 per cent lower than required by building regulation. Special engineering workshops are provided for the aviation specialism.

== Sponsors and partners ==
The UTC partner university is Brunel University and the founding sponsors included Heathrow Airport, Fujitsu, Peter Brett Associates, Royal Aeronautical Society, Aviation Skills Partnership and John Guest.

The school is also part of the Activate Learning Education Trust.

== Academics ==
The school offers these GCSEs: Maths, English Language and Literature, three Sciences, Computer Science and Design Technology with a level 2 Cambridge IT, or EAL Cert Eng. Post 16, the following A levels are offered: Maths, Physics or Computer Science, offered in combination with an Engineering Extended Diploma, and IT Extended Diploma.
