= Ruislip High School =

Coordinates: 51°33′46″N 0°24′42″W

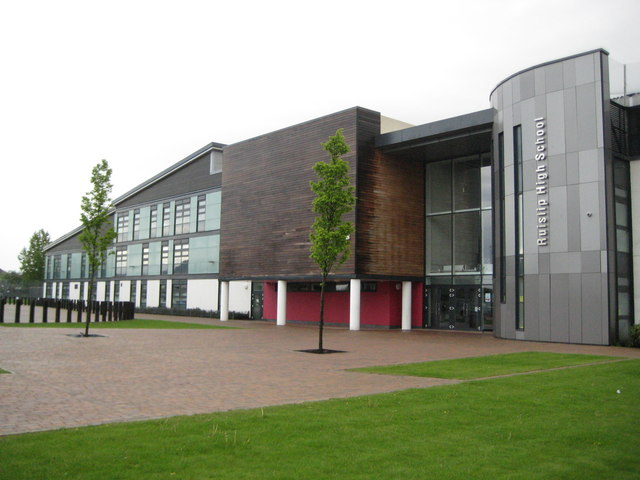

Location
- Sidmouth Drive; Hillingdon, London, HA4 0BY; England

Information
- Type: Academy
- Local authority: Hillingdon
- Department for Education URN: 140748 Tables
- Ofsted: Reports
- Headteacher: Gareth Davies
- Gender: Mixed
- Age: 11 to 18
- Enrolment: 1066
- Website: www.ruisliphigh.com

Ruislip High School is a secondary comprehensive school in Ruislip, within the London Borough of Hillingdon. The school opened to a single intake of Year 7 pupils in September 2006, and was officially opened in a ceremony in March 2007. The school's first GCSE results were released in August 2011, by which time the school had reached being five-form entry. Today, the school has 7 forms of entry per year.

== History ==
The process of planning for a new school began in January 2005 when a group of architects and designers were selected to form a design. Miller Construction Ltd was chosen in May of the same year to commence work on the site, which was required to prepare the greenfield land for the development. The school was designed by the architects Scott Brownrigg, using various methods to reduce the school's energy consumption.

The school opened to a single intake of Year 7 pupils in September 2006, and was officially opened on 21 March 2007 with a ceremony including the burial of a time-capsule in the school grounds.

Following the end of the 2010/11 academic year, the school's first headteacher, John Goulborn, announced his retirement. At the same time, the school received an "outstanding" rating from Ofsted, from an inspection carried out earlier in the year. This was the second time the school had been awarded the rating since opening. In August 2011, the school recorded 81% of students achieving at least five A* to C grades in their GCSEs, excluding English and Mathematics. This came from a total of 151 students entered into the examinations.

Professor Heinz Wolff gave a speech at Ruislip High's first presentation evening, on 16 November 2011.

Previously a community school administered by Hillingdon London Borough Council, Ruislip High School converted to academy status in April 2014. However the school continues to coordinate with Hillingdon London Borough Council for admissions.

== Appearance in The Inbetweeners ==
Ruislip High represents the fictional school "Rudge Park Comprehensive" from The Inbetweeners television series, which began in 2008, and The Inbetweeners Movie.
