= Guru Nanak Sikh Academy =

Location
- Springfield Road; Hayes, Greater London, UB4 0LT; England; 51.5085°N 0.3987°W

Information
- Type: Academy
- Religious affiliation: Sikh
- Established: 1993
- Department for Education URN: 136329 Tables
- Ofsted: Reports
- Principal: Jaskamal Singh Sidhu
- Gender: Mixed
- Age: 4 to 18
- Enrolment: 1,443 as of January 2015
- Website: www.gurunanaksikhacademy.co.uk

Guru Nanak Sikh Academy is a mixed Sikh all-through school and sixth form. It is located in the Hayes area of the London Borough of Hillingdon, England, close to the border of neighbouring town Southall. The school is named after Guru Nanak, the founder of the religion of Sikhism and the first of the ten Sikh Gurus.

== History ==
It was first established as a private school in 1993 by Sant Baba Amar Singh Ji called Guru Nanak Sikh College. The institution split to form Guru Nanak Sikh Primary School and Guru Nanak Sikh Secondary School, and joined the state-maintained sector in 1999 (both as voluntary aided schools). The secondary school converted to academy status in 2010, with the primary school joining in 2012 to form the all-through Guru Nanak Sikh Academy, within the Guru Nanak Sikh Multi Academy Trust.

== Description ==
Guru Nanak Sikh Academy educates pupils through all Key Stages of the English education system leading to GCSE examinations in Year 11. Students in the sixth form have the option to study from a range of A Levels and BTECs.

== Building ==
Guru Nanak Sikh School was extended in 2009. The site is within the London Green Belt so the project had to be evaluated by the London Borough of Hillingdon and the office of the Mayor of London.
