= Graduate (dinghy) =

Type of sailing dinghy

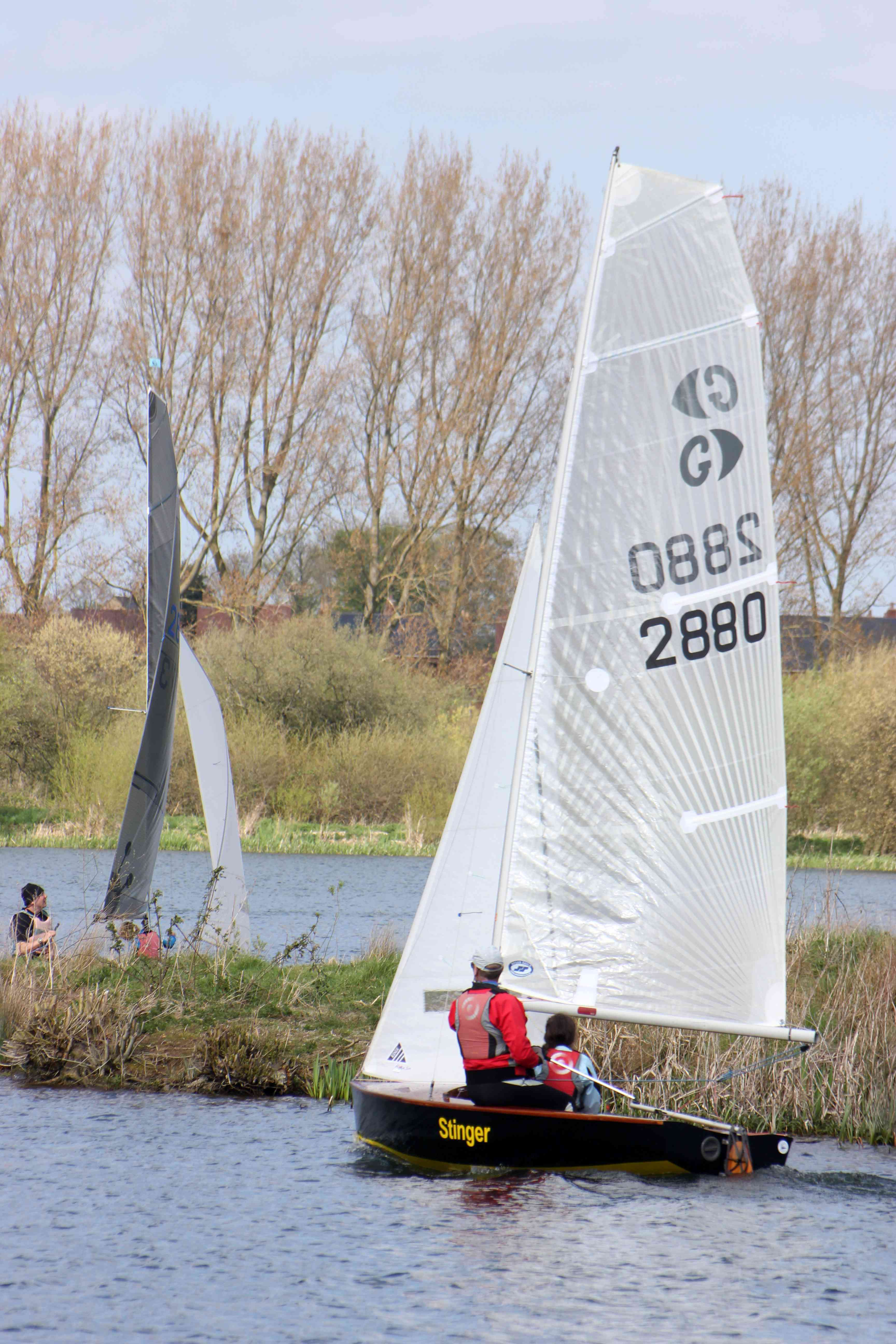
- Graduate dinghy sailing at Emberton Park, UK

Development
- Designer: Dick Wyche
- Year: 1952
- Name: Graduate

Boat
- Crew: 2
- Draft: 1.12 metres (3 ft 8 in)

Hull
- Type: Monohull
- Construction: Fiberglass
- Hull weight: 84 kilograms (185 lb)
- LOA: 3.82 metres (12 ft 6 in)
- Beam: 1.42 metres (4 ft 8 in)

Sails
- Upwind sail area: 10 square metres (110 sq ft)

Racing
- RYA PN: 1129(March 2018)

The Graduate is a 12-foot sailing dinghy with a single-chine hull. Designed by Dick Wyche in 1952, the Graduate has a Bermuda rig.

== Graduate class sailing ==
Rules for the class allow for customization of the boat with rigs of various sophistication. The class holds an open series of races each year and a 3-day National Championship.

Initially built from plywood, the Graduate, which is still in production, is available either in ply or in FRP. Older Graduates can successfully be raced competitively against newer boats, provided their sails are up to par.

In March 2018 the Graduate won best boat in show at the RYA Dinghy Show.
