= Project MoDEL =

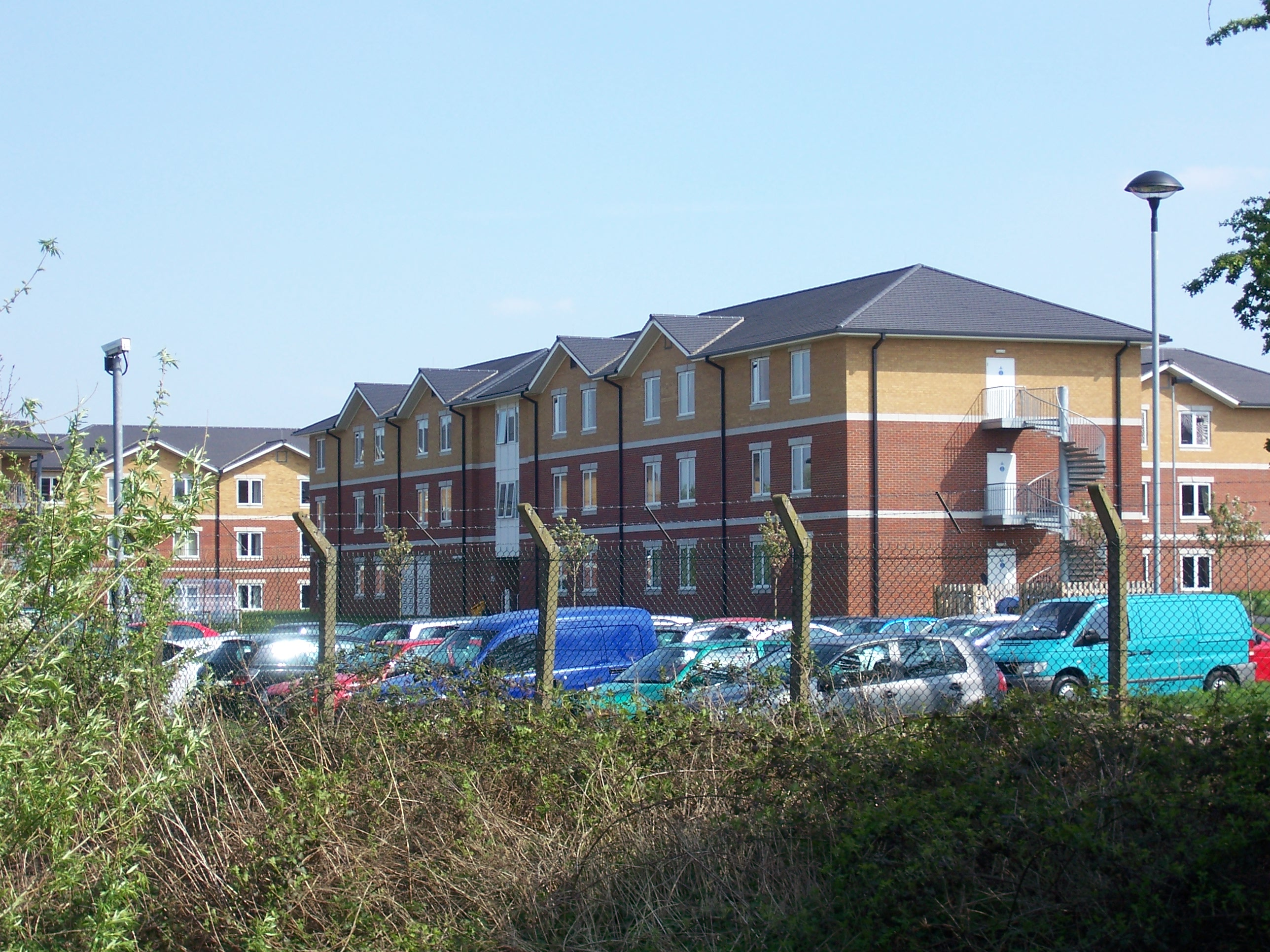
New service personnel accommodation at RAF Northolt

Project MoDEL (Ministry of Defence Estates London) is a project run for the Ministry of Defence (MoD) by the ministry's Defence Infrastructure Organisation and VSM Estates, a joint venture established between Vinci PLC and St. Modwen Properties to bid for the contract. The project involves the consolidation and sale of surplus Ministry of Defence properties around Greater London into around £180m of new developments at RAF Northolt. A total of 80% of the existing buildings at RAF Northolt were demolished and replaced by the newly built facilities.

Under the project, the Royal Air Force was required to close two active stations, two other sites were vacated by the United States Air Force, and the remainder by Ministry of Defence operations.

== Background ==
The project was formed on 29 October 2002 to act on the recommendations of the 1998 Strategic Defence Review, specifically to reduce the number of defence sites in the Greater London area. RAF Northolt, the Royal Artillery Barracks in Woolwich and RAF Uxbridge were initially selected as core sites, for which British and American units would move into. The Royal Air Force would have left RAF Uxbridge, allowing the US Air Force and Navy to move from RAF Daws Hill, RAF Blenheim Crescent and RAF West Ruislip. Units from Uxbridge would move to RAF Northolt and the Royal Artillery Barracks, while RAF Bentley Priory would close within ten years.

In 2006, the project was confirmed to involve the closure of RAF Uxbridge, RAF Eastcote, RAF Bentley Priory, Inglis Barracks and Victoria House, with RAF Northolt the sole core site for unit relocations. The first site to be sold was RAF Eastcote in January 2007. Funds raised from the sale of sites would then be reinvested into the redevelopment work at RAF Northolt. Following the relocation of units, RAF Northolt would become the base for 40 units in total of the RAF, Royal Navy and the British Army.

== Redevelopment sites ==
=== Bentley Priory ===
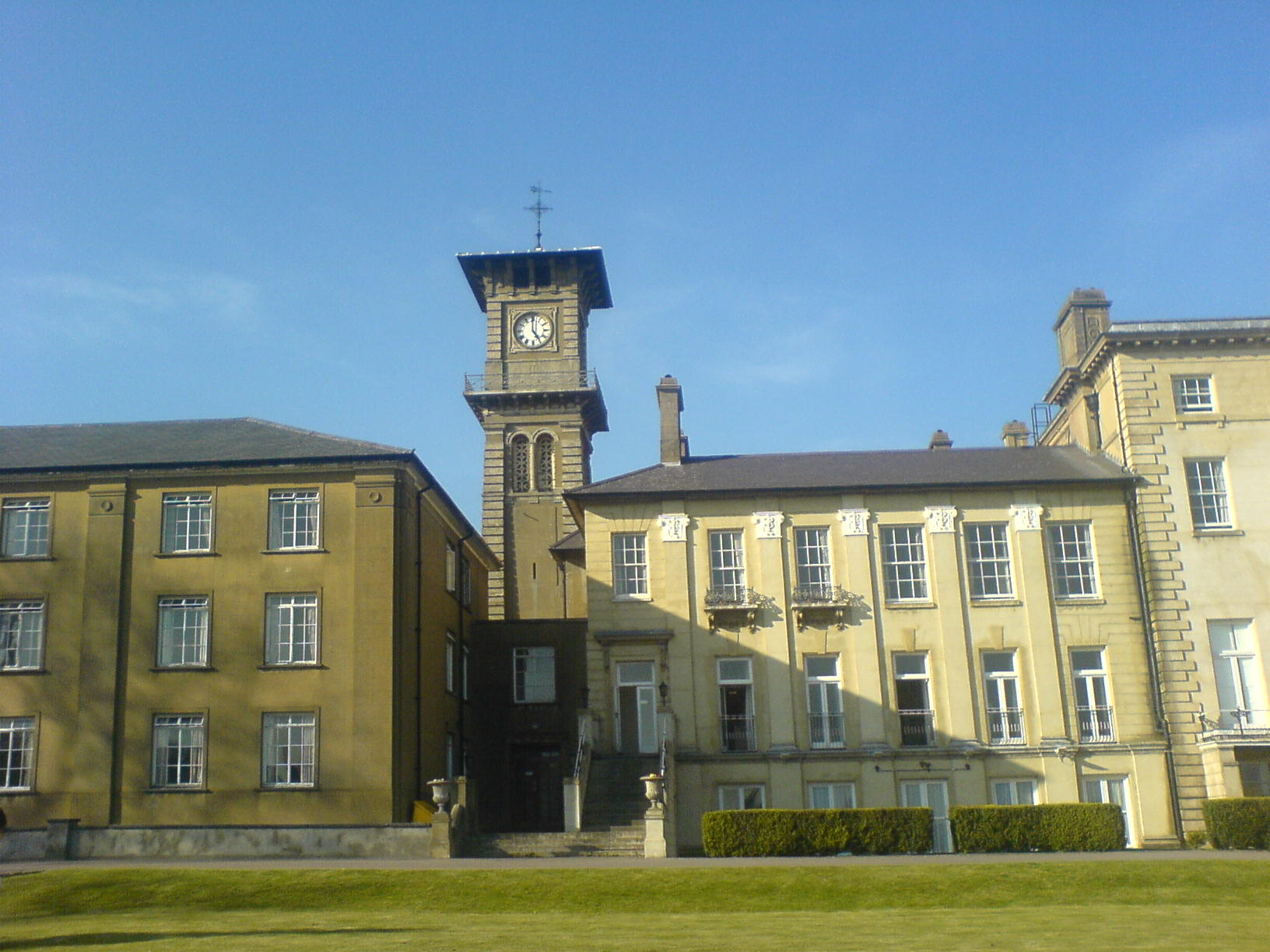
Bentley Priory will house a Battle of Britain museum

RAF Bentley Priory was a non-flying Royal Air Force station near Stanmore in the London Borough of Harrow. It was famous as the headquarters of Fighter Command during the Battle of Britain and the Second World War. The RAF Bentley Priory site includes a Grade II* listed Officers' Mess and Italian Gardens. These, together with the park are designated a Registered Garden Grade II.

Originally built in 1766, Bentley Priory was significantly extended in 1788, by Sir John Soane, for John Hamilton, 1st Marquess of Abercorn. The priory was the final home of the Dowager Queen Adelaide, queen consort of William IV, before her death there in 1849. It subsequently served as a hotel and girls' school before being acquired by the Royal Air Force in 1926.

The Royal Air Force station role ceased on 30 May 2008, following the relocation of units to their new accommodation at RAF Northolt and the site will be used for private accommodation and the Officers' Mess will become a Battle of Britain museum. RAF Bentley Priory closed in 2008 with plans for the building to be refurbished with luxury apartments and a Battle of Britain museum on RAF Fighter Command documenting the site's key role in the Battle. In September 2010 the site was sold to Barratt Homes for the development of new housing and City & Country for the conversion of the existing building into housing and the museum.

=== Eastcote ===
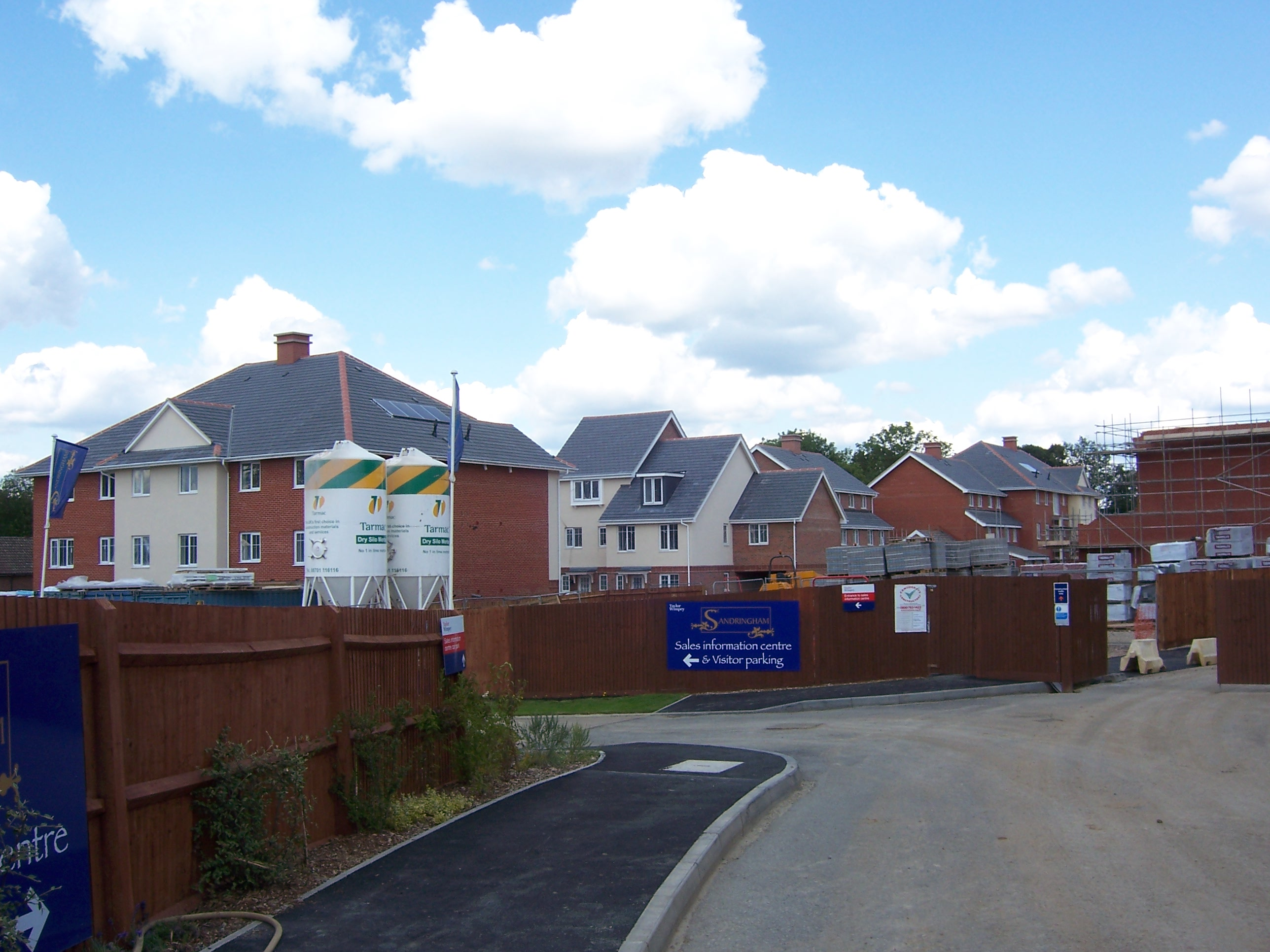
Housing under construction on the former RAF Eastcote site in 2011

RAF Eastcote was originally built as a military hospital during the Second World War to prepare for military casualties in the D-Day landings. They were subsequently not required for the purpose and became barracks for Navy WRENS. A Bletchley Park outpost was established at the station during the Second World War to house some of the Bombe and Colossus codebreaker machines. After the war the site was purchased by the Crown in 1947 and housed the fledgling GCHQ before it moved to Cheltenham. Other buildings were used by the Post Office, the United States Air Force and a women's teacher training college.

The site was sold for development to George Wimpey in 2007 with plans for the construction of 385 new homes. The 19-acre (77,000 m^{2}) site was the first to be disposed of as part of Project MoDEL. All buildings on the site were demolished in 2008.

=== Mill Hill ===
All Royal Air Force activity, along with the offices of the British Forces Post Office, based at the Inglis Barracks in Mill Hill from 1962, were relocated to new purpose-built buildings at RAF Northolt, along with new accommodation to replace the demolished barracks at Eastcote and West Ruislip, following a public-private agreement between the government and contractors. The new Post Office building was designed and constructed by Bovis Lend Lease with a 75,000-square-foot (7,000 m^{2}) sorting hall.

=== Uxbridge ===
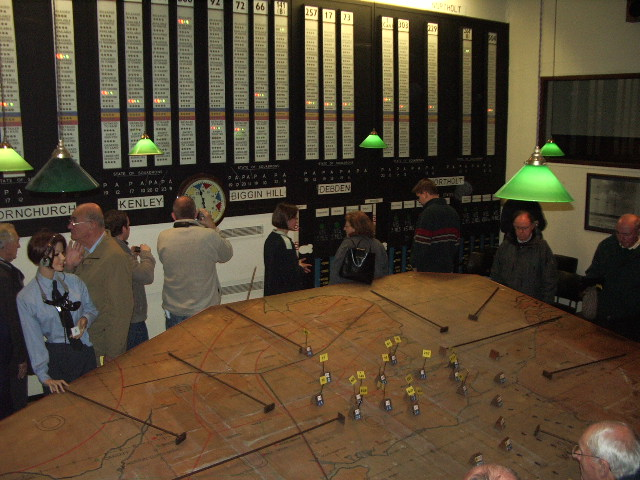
The Battle of Britain Bunker at RAF Uxbridge

RAF Uxbridge was a non-flying station of the RAF in Uxbridge in the London Borough of Hillingdon. The station was built within the grounds of Hillingdon House, which had been purchased by the British Government in 1915.

The station is best known as the headquarters of No. 11 Group RAF commanded by Air Chief Marshal Keith Park during the Battle of Britain, when it was responsible for the defence of the main area of combat around London and the South-East of England. The group headquarters were at Hillingdon House within the base grounds. An underground bunker, now known as the Battle of Britain Bunker, was built nearby to handle the control of fighter squadrons, primarily from the 11 Group Operations Room. The base was responsible for controlling the evacuation of Dunkirk in May 1940 (Operation Dynamo) and the air operations of the D-Day landings during the latter stages of the war in 1944 (Operation Overlord).

RAF Uxbridge closed on 31 March 2010 with the final remaining units transferring to their new base at RAF Northolt the following day. Plans for the site, totalling 110-acre (450,000 m^{2}), were approved for development in January 2011 by the London Borough of Hillingdon. These involve the construction of 1,340 homes, shops, a theatre and a primary school built over 10 years, with the retention of all listed buildings on the site. The London Borough of Hillingdon aim for the development to become an extension of Uxbridge town centre.

=== Victoria House ===
Victoria House in Greenwich, covering a 1.5-acre (6,100 m^{2}) site, has also been sold, having been vacated in 2010. The building is now being converted for use as the Primary School element of Greenwich Free School.

=== West Ruislip ===
RAF West Ruislip was a former US Navy administration base, located in Ickenham within the London Borough of Hillingdon. It housed the Navy Exchange of the U.S. Naval Activities, United Kingdom command. The base was leased from the Ministry of Defence having originally been constructed for Royal Air Force use.

In 2007 almost all buildings on the site were demolished, and the 21-acre (85,000 m^{2}) site sold to Cala Homes for £180m in November that year. Plans for around 415 homes and a retirement home were approved by the London Borough of Hillingdon in July 2007.

== See also ==
- Project Allenby Connaught
