= David Ballantyne Smith =

British man convicted of espionage

- Born: Paisley, Renfrewshire, Scotland
- Military career
- Service: Royal Air Force

David Ballantyne Smith is a British former security guard who was convicted of espionage on behalf of Russia.

== Early life ==
David Ballantyne Smith was born in Paisley, Renfrewshire, Scotland. Smith enlisted in the Royal Air Force in 1985 and served for 12 years which included a posting to the former Fighter Command headquarters at Bentley Priory. After leaving the RAF, he moved to Crawley, West Sussex and took a job as a flight auditor at Gatwick Airport, before leaving to work as a flight attendant, a position he kept until 2002.

== Espionage ==
Smith pleaded guilty to eight offences under the Official Secrets Act on 4 November 2022. He was sentenced to 13 years and two months' imprisonment.

Following Smith's convictions, the Foreign Office carried out a security review of every member of embassy staff at a cost of £825,000.
