= Victoria House, Greenwich =

Building in Greenwich, London, England

Coordinates: 51.47190°N 0.05386°E

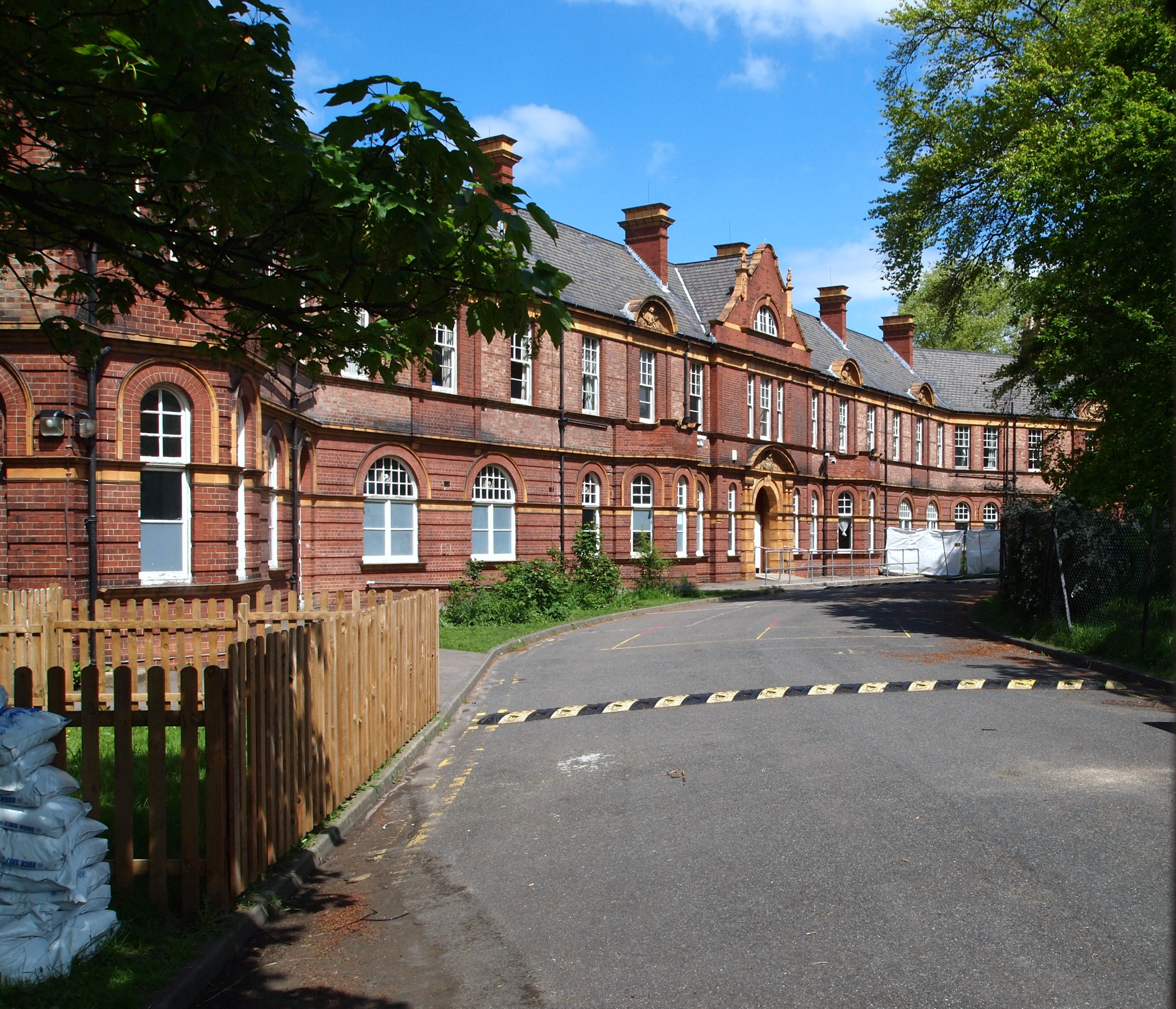
Victoria House, Shooter's Hill

Victoria House, Greenwich on Shooter's Hill in Greenwich is the former officers mess' and living quarters for the Royal Army Medical Corps. It is a "Building of Local Architectural or Historic Interest".

== History ==
The building was constructed in the classical style in 1909. It became the officers' mess and living quarters for the Royal Army Medical Corps staff employed at the Royal Herbert Hospital. The Ministry of Defence sold the building as part of Project MoDEL in June 2013 and, although it was originally planned that the building would be converted into a 75 bedroom residential care home, the building is now being converted for use as the Primary School element of Greenwich Free School.
