= RAF West Ruislip =

Former Royal Air Force's depot in London

RAF West Ruislip
- Ickenham, Middlesex
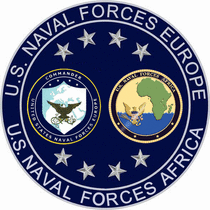

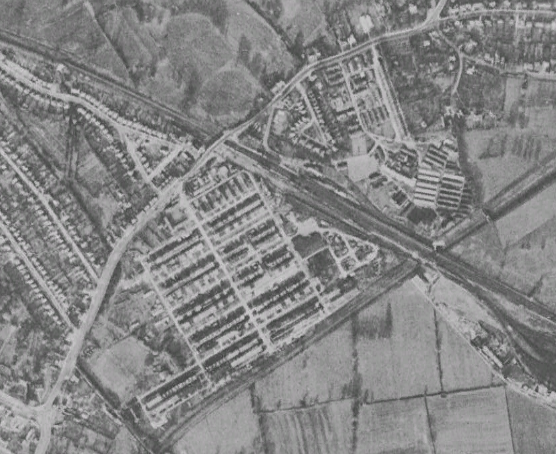
- Aerial view of RAF West Ruislip in 1945 - RAF Blenheim Crescent is to the north-east of the railway line

Site information
- Type: Maintenance and administrative
- Condition: Demolished

Location
- Coordinates: 51°34′7.58″N 000°26′15.80″W

Site history
- Built: 1917
- Built by: American Construction Company
- Demolished: 2007

Garrison information
- Past commanders: Lieutenant Commander H. Lee (first)
- Occupants: No. 4 Maintenance Unit (RAF); RAF Records Office; Navy Exchange of U.S. Naval Activities, United Kingdom; US Navy Morale, Welfare and Recreation Department

RAF West Ruislip was a Ministry of Defence site, located in Ickenham within the London Borough of Hillingdon. The base was originally built as a depot for the Royal Air Force (RAF), split by what is now the Chiltern Main Line. North of the railway was RAF Blenheim Crescent, which housed the RAF Records Office and the depot's original personnel accommodation.

The site was leased to the US Air Force in 1955, followed by the US Navy in 1975, eventually housing the Navy Exchange of the U.S. Naval Activities, United Kingdom command, and the Navy's Morale, Welfare and Recreation Department.

Following a review of properties, the US Navy vacated the site in 2006 and it became surplus to the Ministry of Defence's requirements under Project MoDEL. The following year, initial plans for around 415 homes and a retirement home were approved by the London Borough of Hillingdon in July 2007. Almost all buildings were subsequently demolished to make way for the new development. Cala Homes bought the 21-acre (85,000 m^{2}) site for £180m in November.

== History ==
=== Establishment ===
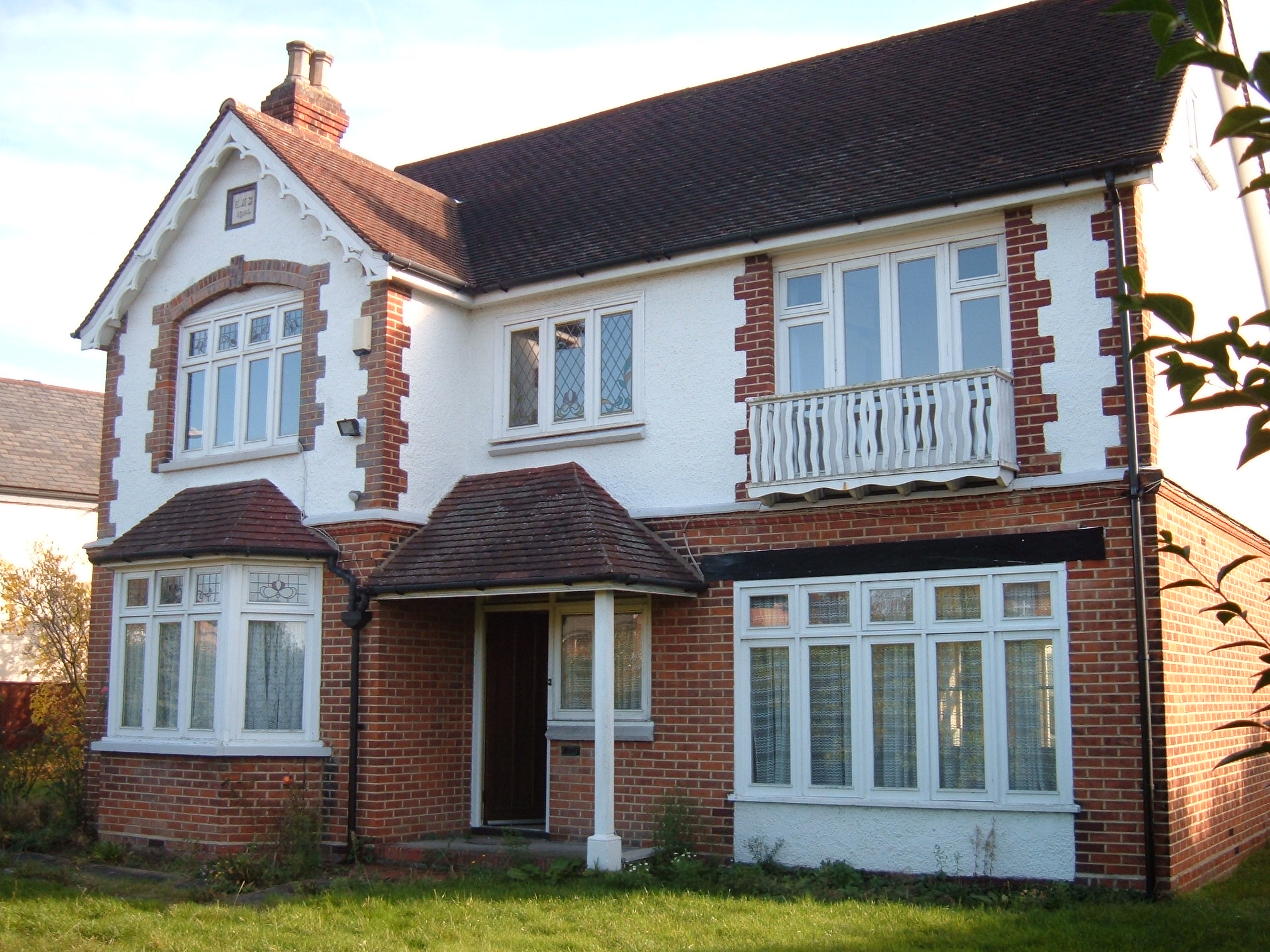
Fairlight House, built in 1914

The land upon which the site was developed was originally owned by Edward Hilliard. It was chosen in March 1915 by Wing Commander T. O. Lyons of the Air Ministry to house the Ordnance Aircraft Stores Depot from Farnborough, although a decision was made instead to establish the depot in Didcot, beside the existing buildings there. In 1917, the Ruislip site was revisited, and on 3 July was selected to house a depot for the Royal Flying Corps, under a military acquisition order. The close proximity to the Great Western and Metropolitan Railways made it ideal for the purpose.

Additional construction costs meant the final total was £736,000, up from an original estimate of £235,000. The need for heating brought with it the requirement for boiler houses, plus additional foundations which were needed for the buildings to the north of the railway. Lieutenant J.G.N. Clifts of the Royal Engineers created the design for the site and buildings, and the contractor involved was a U.S. Army civil engineering company, appearing on records as American Construction Company. A temporary railway siding was created to aid in the delivery of building supplies. By 13 December 1918, several sheds had been completed, as were the Officers' Mess, sleeping quarters and the Navy and Army Canteen Board.

Between May and July 1918, military stores from White City, Wormwood Scrubs and Baker Street were moved to the site, with items kept in the completed sheds. A shortage of bricks in October meant the widening of the bridge over the railway was delayed, as was the construction of the railway line into the site.

=== Inter-war years ===
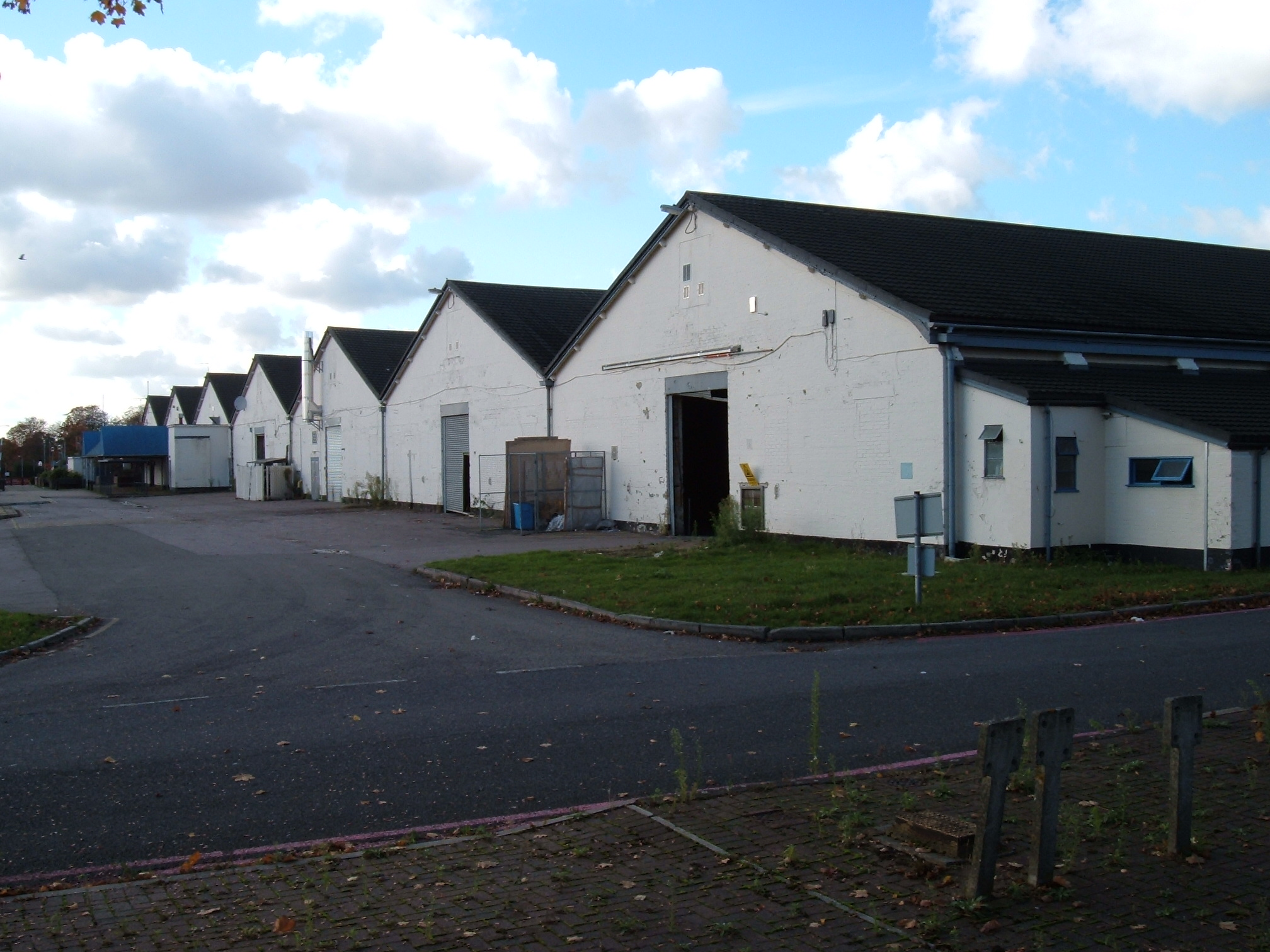
Shed No.1 was the only original storage shed on the site

The Air Ministry wrote to the land surveyors employed by Edward Hilliard on 3 September 1919 to announce they wished to buy the land to allow for its permanent use by the RAF. Hilliard did not accept the initial offer of £5,900, but agreed to sell by the eventual deadline of 17 January 1920, receiving the sum of £6,350. A resident of the land, Mrs Saitch of Home Farm, had her tenancy cancelled on 29 September and was paid compensation by the military until 25 March 1921, although the authorities did not believe her worthy.

Fairlight House, built in 1914, was included within the site and later became the residence of the Commander of US Naval Activities, United Kingdom. RAF Records were also based at the site along with the Maintenance Unit. The Great Western Railway, now the Chiltern Main Line, ran through the site, separating the regimental buildings to the north from the depot buildings to the south.

The RAF Records Office in 1926

A "Homice Scheme" was established at all RAF stations in 1921, to prepare for cases of civil disturbance. To prepare, the fences around the depot belonging to the nearby railway company were replaced by a non-climable variety. An RAF guard made up of a sergeant, corporal, acting corporal and twenty three airmen was formed to protect the site. During the rest of the decade, the Metropolitan Police provided a guard of eleven constables, eight of whom were housed in the sick bay. The remaining three were married, and were given their own houses in Park Road in Uxbridge.

The Air Ministry placed an order in 1922 for the closure of the public footpath that ran through the site, providing £750 for the maintenance of nearby Green Lane where the path originated. The eventual order, dated 15 October 1924, replaced two previous orders from 1922 and 1923 which had required a replacement route, though no such route was established.

In 1924, the Air Ministry officially separated the two sites administratively, so that the depot site and accommodation site (RAF Blenheim Crescent) were considered two separate RAF stations. Between 1920 and 1939, the original accommodation buildings in the north of the site were replaced by new married quarters.

The RAF established the Apprentice Clerks Scheme at the Records Office in October 1925, after an earlier trial in 1921 had concluded successfully. Under the scheme, apprentices were trained in general administrative and accounting duties, practising shorthand typing in the depot while also acting as messengers in the Records Office. A total of 2,080 apprentices passed through the scheme between 1925 and 1942.

The station commander, Wing Commander Lyons died in his quarters on 1 February 1926 and was buried in the churchyard of St Giles' Church on 4 February. His funeral was attended by all personnel from the depot, the Records Office and the Central Band of the RAF. He was succeeded by Wing Commander F. H. Kirby.

=== Second World War ===
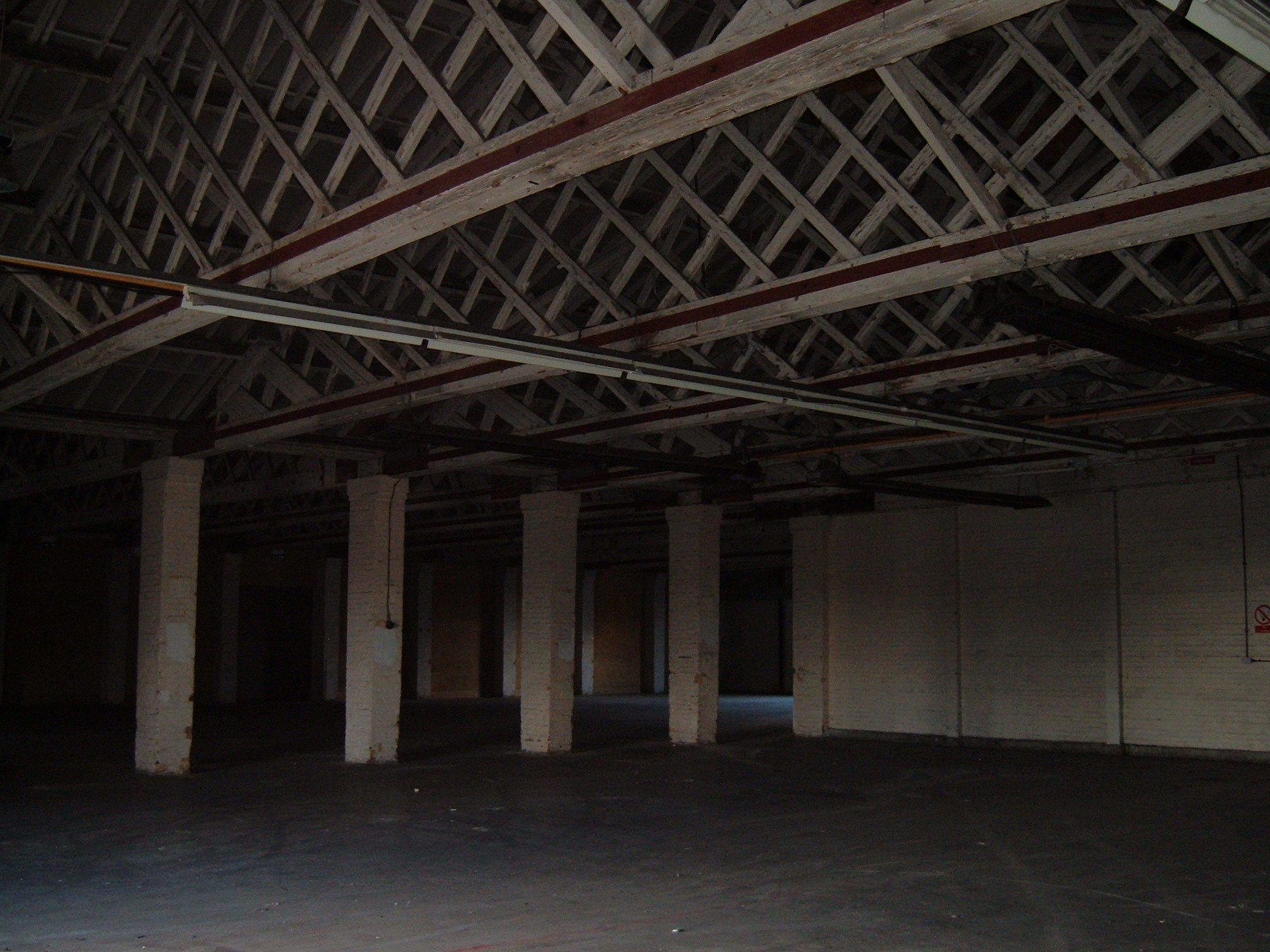
Interior of Shed No. 1

Under the newly formed RAF Maintenance Command, the depot became part of No. 40 Group RAF (Equipment) in 1939 as No. 4 Maintenance Unit RAF, under the overall command of Air Commodore R. W. Thomas.

The depot became responsible for the provision and maintenance of engines for the Advanced Air Striking Force. These were then sent to Hartlebury and Quedgeley to be despatched to units. Ammunition was also prepared and sent to squadrons in action.

No. 71 Maintenance Unit RAF in Slough came under control of the Ruislip depot in January 1941. The increase in personnel lead to an extension of the station canteen in May. Additionally, a Navy, Army and Air Force Institutes (NAAFI) canteen was built on the RAF Blenheim Crescent site on 6 May. In order to protect it from potential enemy bombing, the majority of the Records Office was moved to a temporary base in Gloucester on 10 May.

Later in the war, No. 4 Maintenance Unit became involved with radio and RDF preparations for the D-Day landings. It also produced waterproof radar equipment for use by the US Air Force's 2nd Tactical Air Force in 1944 which could be used even when submerged under 6 feet (1.8 m) of water.

=== Post-war years ===
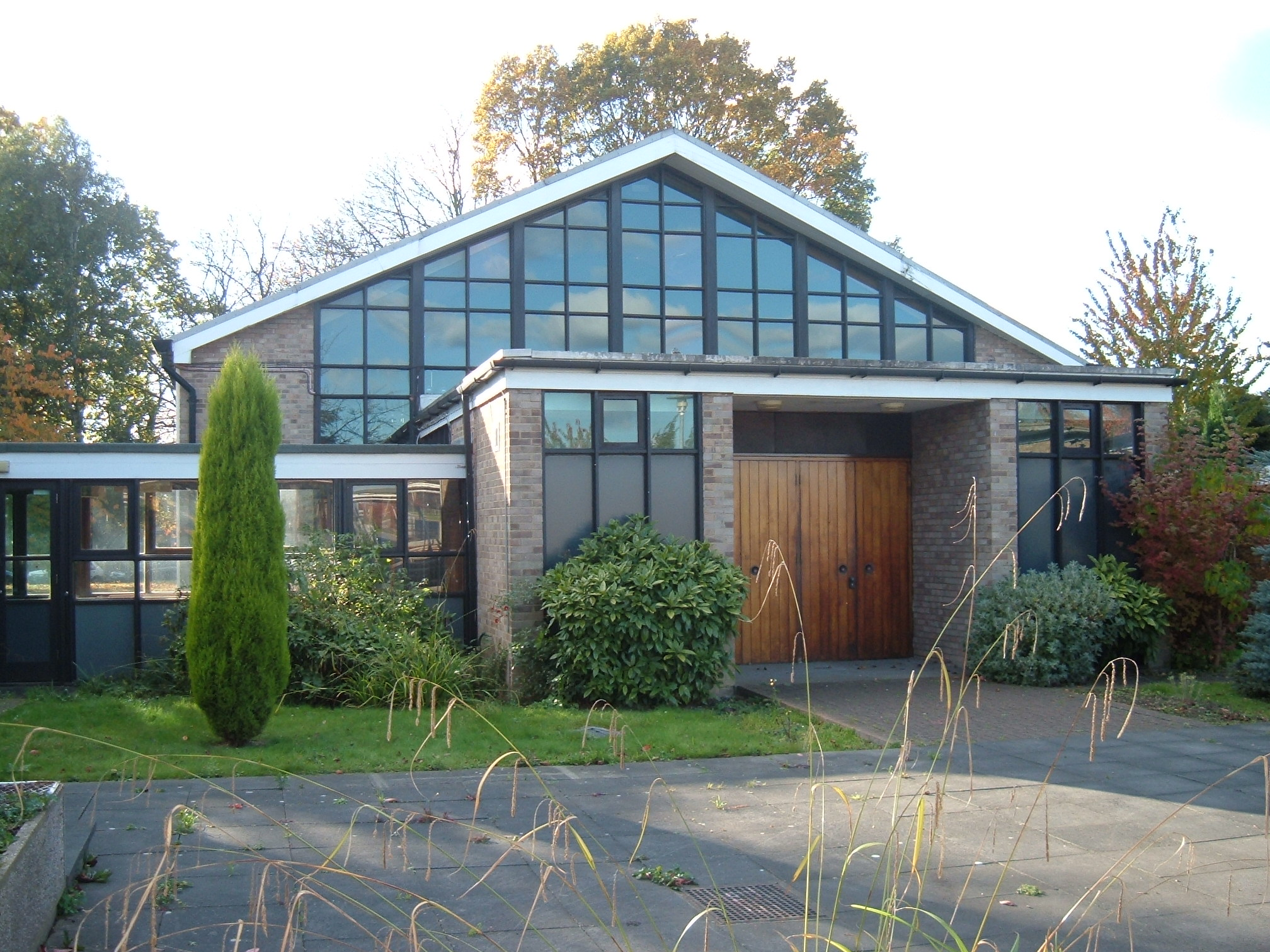
The American Forces chapel

Following the end of the war, the depot was responsible for the repair of vehicles and the conversion of aircrew coaches. Aircraft engines, propellers and radar equipment also continued to be repaired on the site, as were vehicles from the US Air Force's Third Air Force base at nearby RAF South Ruislip which began to be serviced from April 1949. The American vehicles were maintained in a dedicated shed, No. 5.

The remaining Records Office operation closed at Ruislip on 1 May 1951, having been run as a subsidiary of the Gloucester office since the previous year. A lack of available housing in the Gloucester area meant the closure was not completed until 16 May 1952. It was proposed in April of that year to convert the base to an Air Ministry Unit and transfer the operations of RAF West Drayton to it.

On 1 August 1951, the Medical Survey Office was formed on the station as a unit of RAF Home Command. The office was responsible for all medical records, which were transferred from the RAF Records Office. It was moved to another building in November but was relocated to RAF Innsworth on 16 May 1952.

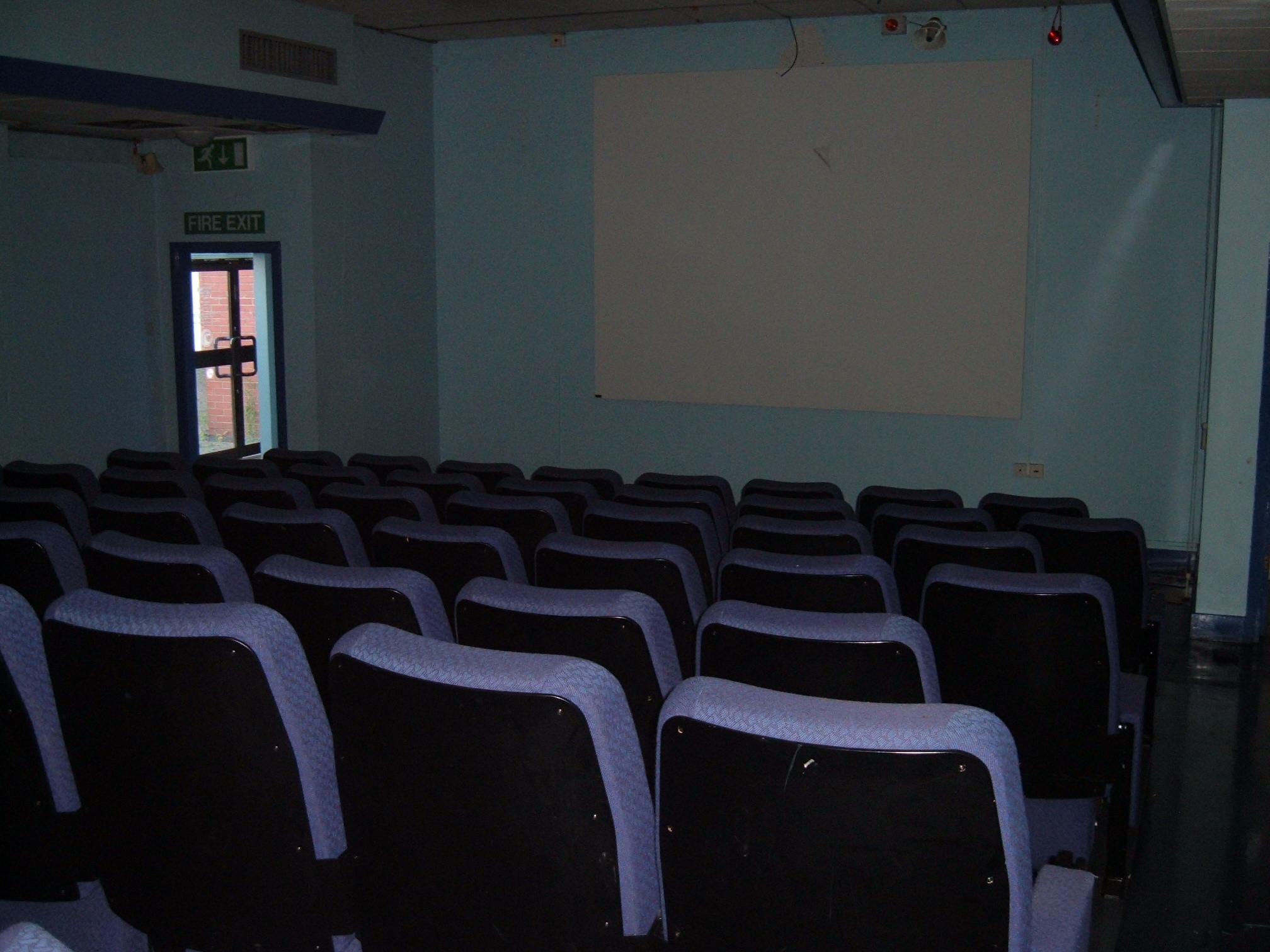
The station cinema screen room

The station was passed to the US Air Force Third Air Force on 1 December 1955, to enable the consolidation of facilities at several sites in the country into a single location. On 1 October 1962, the American 7500th Air Base Group was relocated to RAF West Ruislip from RAF South Ruislip. The base became a center of operations for the A&AFES and EES and was used as a warehousing facility with bldg 6 the office area for EES. There was a bowling alley on the base and a baseball ground, with after the forced closure of South Ruislip by Kodak the owners of South Ruislip, a small BX was opened. A&AFES and EES continued at West Ruislip for several years after the USAF moved to Mildenhall / Lakenheath. After the US Air Force decided to close RAF South Ruislip and move their headquarters to RAF Mildenhall in 1972, 77 civilian members of staff at West Ruislip were made redundant.

Between 1958 and 1960, the station's chapel was built by Brandt O'Dell. The building incorporated a nave with seating space for 350 people, and connecting wings to the hall and narthex. In 1962, the gymnasium was built on the site.

The US Navy leased the site in December 1975 and constructed additional facilities for personnel and their families, including a bar, filling station, post office, cinema, chapel, school, baseball diamond and a medical and dental centre. These came under the Morale, Welfare and Recreation Department.

A large area of the site was demolished in the late 1980s for a large residential development named "Brackenbury Village". Housing was shared between personnel and British families. The Children's Welfare and Family Services Centre was built in 1988 by Kier Construction. The building incorporated separate sections for children and families. Among other recreational facilities, two squash courts were built in 1989, and a baseball diamond and field house were built in 1995. Dugouts were also built nearby the following year.In 2006 The Douay Martyrs School submitted a proposal to relocate from the current two sites, to one new building based on the closed RAF West Ruislip site. This bid was turned down by the Ministry of Defence (United Kingdom).[6]

== Closure and redevelopment ==
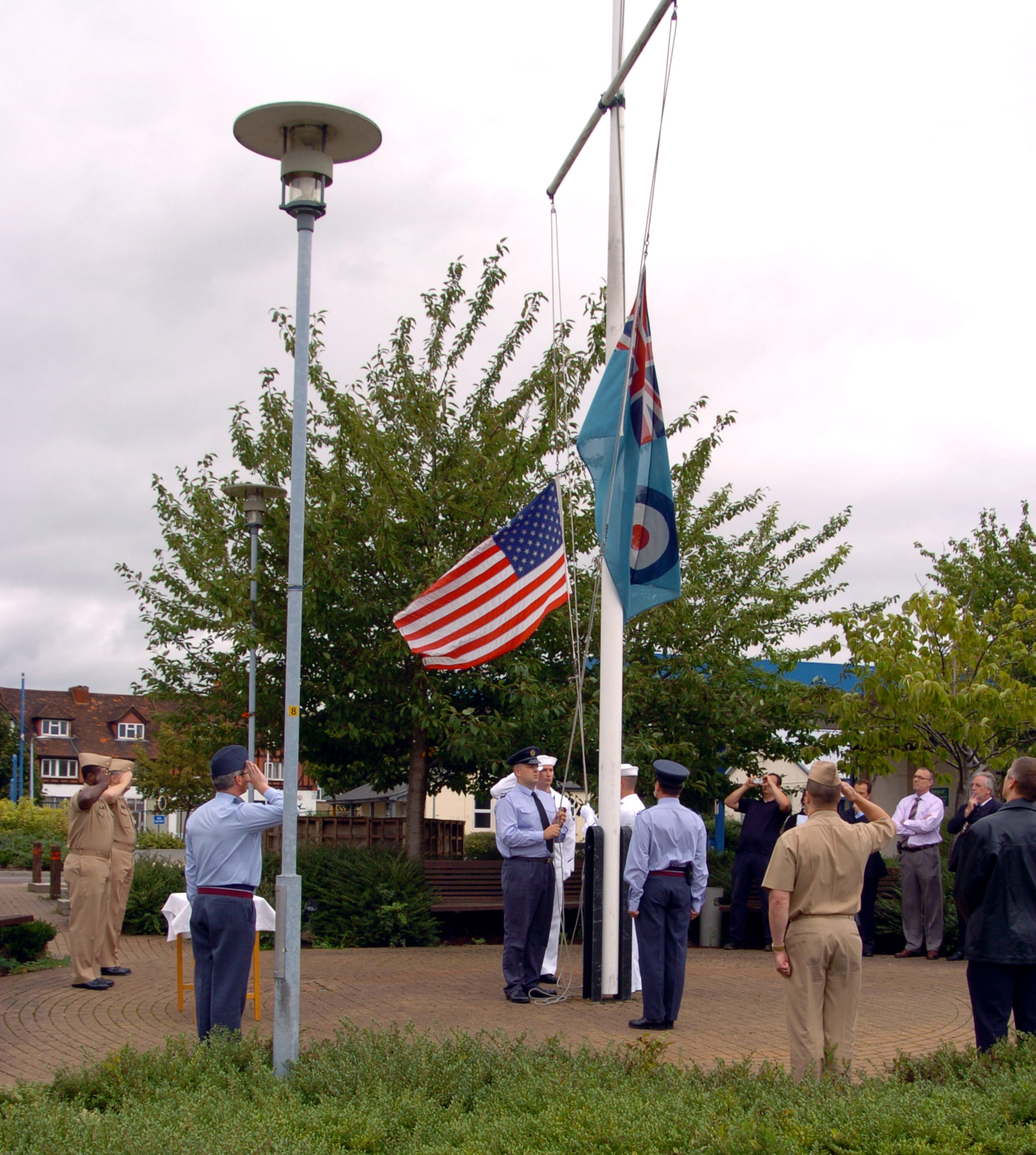
The American flag and RAF Ensign are lowered during the closure ceremony

Following a review of facilities, the US Navy elected to vacate the West Ruislip site, beginning on 30 June 2006. The final chapel service had been held on 5 June. Many operations returned to the United States, as part of a plan to save $1 million each year. Staff redundancies involved 7 US service personnel, 55 civilian staff from the US Department of Defence and 95 British civilian staff. The base closed during a ceremony on 28 September, in which the American flag and Royal Air Force Ensign were lowered.

All personnel from the Navy Exchange had already transferred to new facilities in Naples, Italy. U.S. Naval Activities, United Kingdom was officially stood down on 14 September 2007 at a ceremony at RAF Daws Hill.

In late 2007, all buildings on the site excluding the elementary school were demolished. RAF Blenheim Crescent was not included in the demolition works. The Brackenbury Village housing was retained as it was separate from the military buildings. Cala Homes purchased the 21-acre (85,000 m^{2}) site for a £180m development in November 2007. Explore Living Thames Valley later bought a 5.5-acre (22,000 m^{2}) plot from Cala Homes in February 2008.

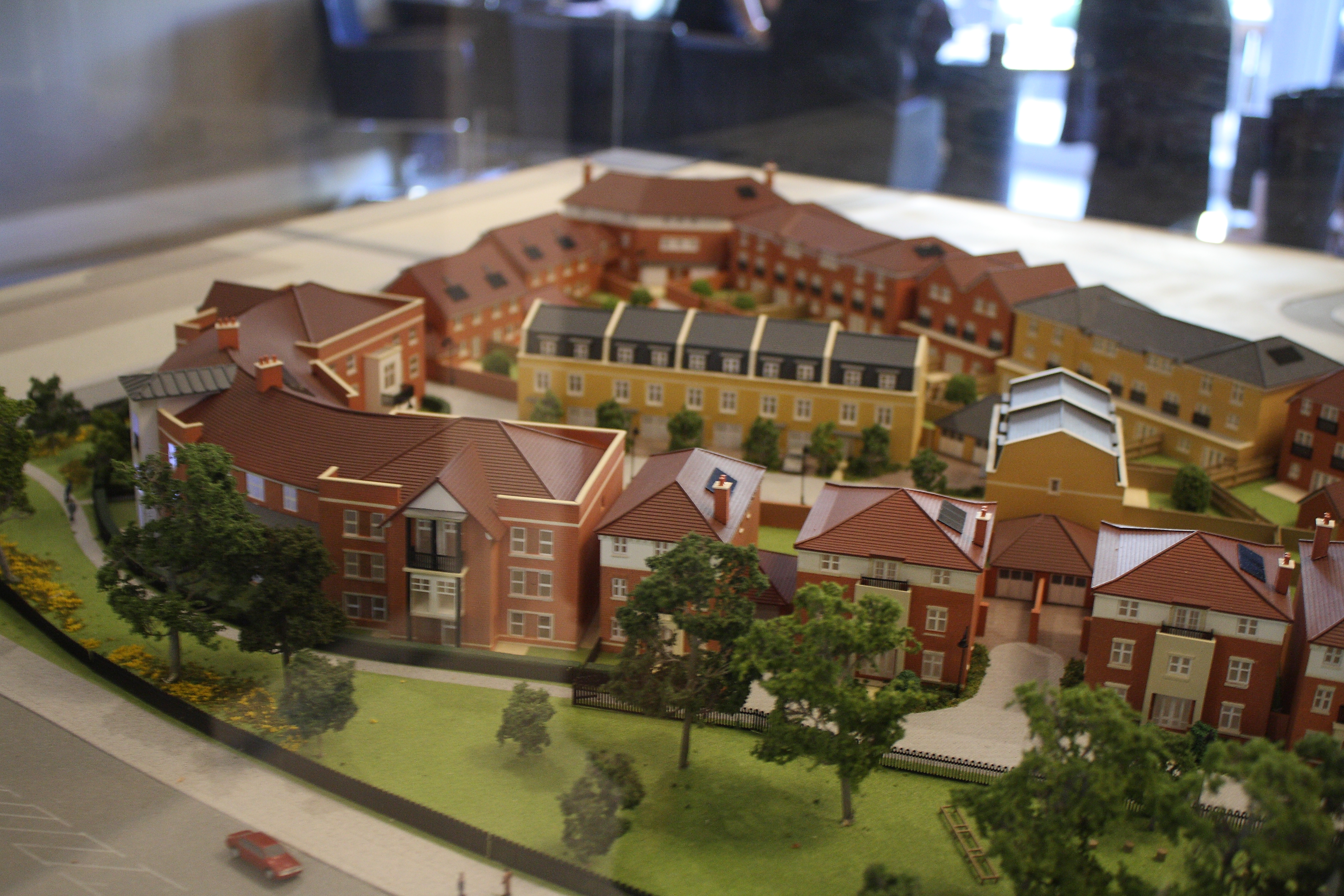
Scale model of the Ickenham Park development

Outline planning permission was granted by the London Borough of Hillingdon in January 2009 despite local opposition to some buildings having flat roofs. Up to 50% of the new homes would be social housing. The plan included 415 homes, with an 80-bed care home; the largest buildings would be six storeys high.

In September 2010, Cala Homes sought permission from the London Borough of Hillingdon to sell the first 30 completed homes before completing all highway work on the site in order to keep the development financially viable.

By September 2011, around 50 of the first 100 homes had been sold, with an additional 30 houses under construction. The largest building under construction, Cottesmore House, was completed in October 2011. The final homes on the Ickenham Park development were completed during 2013. A McCarthy & Stone tailored care living development received planning permission in May 2014 and opened in 2016.

In September 2014, the Eden Academy Trust began a public consultation on reopening the former elementary school as a free special school in January 2015. Under the plans, it would be refurbished and open to 32 pupils, and would be gradually expanded to eventually have a full intake of 140 pupils by September 2016. The school, named Pentland Field School, opened to its first intake of pupils on 12 January 2015, and was officially reopened by the Permanent Secretary for the Department for Education, Chris Wormald.

== See also ==
- West Ruislip station for adjacent tube and railway station
- List of former Royal Air Force stations
