= United States Air Force in the United Kingdom =

Bases of the United States Air Force in the United Kingdom
- Part of the NATO Alliance
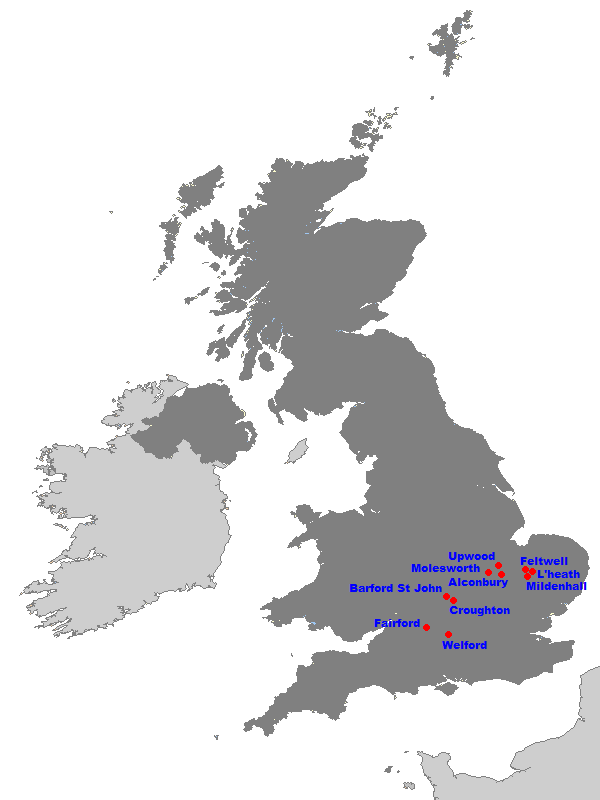
- Map of Royal Air Force stations used by the United States Air Forces in Europe.
Date	1951—present
Location	United Kingdom
Result	Phased down in number as a result of the end of the Cold War, some maintained as part of the NATO military alliance.

Since 1942, the United States has maintained air bases in the United Kingdom. Major Commands of the United States Airforce (USAF) having bases in the United Kingdom were the United States Air Forces in Europe (USAFE), Strategic Air Command (SAC), and Air Mobility Command (AMC).

== Origins ==
The origins of the United States Air Force in the UK can be traced to a series of agreements made between 27 January and 27 March 1941 which provided for American naval, ground and air support for campaigns against Nazi Germany. As a result, a special U.S. Army Observer Group was activated in London on 19 May 1941. One of the first tasks of that unit was to reconnoitre areas regarded as potential sites for United States Army Air Forces (USAAF) installations.

On 2 January 1942 the order activating the Eighth Air Force was signed and the headquarters was formed at Savannah, Georgia on 28 January. On 8 January the activation of U.S. Forces in the British Isles (USAFBI) was announced, and VIII Bomber Command (VIII BC) was established in England during February 1942. VIII BC was established at RAF Bomber Command Headquarters at RAF Daws Hill, in High Wycombe, on 22 February.

== Post-war period ==
With the end of World War II, the United States began to demobilize most of the Air Force which it created in the United Kingdom. In Europe, the aim was to maintain a small USAAF organization, exclusively for communication and transport purposes. On 7 August 1945, the word Strategic was removed from USSAFE, and the United States Air Forces in Europe (USAFE) was established. By the end of 1946, USAFE had only about 75,000 personnel and fewer than 2,000 aircraft.

All B-29 operations in England were placed under the command of USAFE's 3d Air Force, established at RAF Marham. At the close of World War II, most of the air bases used by the USAAF were returned to the British government and were in various states of repair by 1948. The Ministry of Defence made available Marham, RAF Scampton, RAF Waddington and RAF Lakenheath for B-29 operations. RAF Lakenheath was refurbished with an extended runway to accommodate the giant Convair B-36, however the B-36s were maintained at Carswell Air Force Base in Texas for the time being.

SAC continued rotational deployments of its strategic bomber force, keeping a strategic bomber force in Europe for almost 20 years until 1966, when the Boeing B-47 Stratojet was phased out of SAC's inventory with the UK bases being returned to the British or converted into USAFE tactical bases.

== Modernization and arrivals from France ==
By the early 1960s, the USAF in England had a very mixed collection of aircraft. RF-101s, various versions of the B-66 and B-57, and F-84s and F-86s comprised USAFE's tactical aircraft arsenal. This large number of different aircraft was a maintenance and logistics nightmare because all the different parts for all the different aircraft had to be kept in stock. Indeed, this issue was not confined to the UK or just USAFE. There was a need for standardization and also to modernize for an aircraft which could perform many different tasks from air defense to ground support and aerial reconnaissance. The McDonnell F-4 Phantom II was that aircraft.

On 12 May 1965 the first F-4 Phantom arrived in the UK where it all began, with an RF-4C arriving at RAF Alconbury to replace the 10th TRW's RB-66s. In October, the F-101C "Voodoos" at Bentwaters/Woodbridge were also replaced by F-4Cs, as well as the F-100s at RAF Lakenheath.

The F-4 Phantoms remained in the UK for the next 20 years, being replaced by the next generation of F-15/F-16s in the mid-1980s.

On 21 February 1966, French President Charles de Gaulle announced that France would loosen its ties to NATO. He announced that French forces were no longer available to the Allies, and all foreign army and air force units, as well as NATO Headquarters must be removed from France by 1 April 1967.

Losing the French bases was a blow to USAFE. At the time it comprised eleven tactical units plus four interceptor squadrons. A large-scale relocation plan, Operation FRELOC was developed to remove all USAF aircraft and equipment, as well as 33,000 USAFE personnel and their families from France.

As a result of FRELOC, USAFE's presence in England grew considerably. Three fighter wings, the 20th TFW at RAF Wethersfield, the 48th TFW at RAF Lakenheath and the 81st TFW at RAF Bentwaters came under 3d Air Force. Between these three wings were about 225 aircraft, mainly F-100 Super Sabre and F-4 Phantom IIs. USAFE in England also included two Tactical Reconnaissance Wings, the 10th at RAF Alconbury and the 66th at RAF Upper Heyford with between them about 100 RF-101s and RF-4Cs, along with the 513th Troop Carrier Wing at RAF Mildenhall.

Also, RAF Burtonwood, which was operating as a reserve USAFE base since the opening of Châteauroux-Déols Air Base in the early 1950s was turned over to the US Army in 1966 and was renamed Burtonwood Army Depot. The Army transferred all of its stores and equipment in France to Burtonwood and operated the facility as its primary storage and logistics depot for 7th Army support in Europe until the mid-1990s.

In the 1970s, the General Dynamics F-111 arrived at Upper Heyford. In 1978 the first of about 120 A-10 Thunderbolt II aircraft arrived at RAF Bentwaters/Woodbrige. Originally six squadrons were assigned to the 81st TFW, however later two squadrons were moved to the 10th Tactical Fighter Wing at RAF Alconbury. Close Air Support missions made the A-10 vulnerable to ground fire, so most of the underside of the aircraft is made of armoured titanium. To stay out of reach of hostile radar, many of the A-10's missions were flown at nearly ground level. The A-10s in the UK were painted in a special camouflage scheme designed for European weather conditions, made from a special type of paint that can absorb 60% of the sun's rays. Because different densities of paint were used, its colors tended to change in different light conditions.

== Air Transport and Special Operations ==
Although most USAF bases in the UK had combat missions, in 1966, the Military Air Transport Service established a permanent facility at RAF Mildenhall after the phaseout of the SAC Reflex mission. The 313th Tactical Airlift Wing operates Lockheed C-5 Galaxy and C-141 Starlifter flights to and from the UK from bases worldwide. The group also operates Lockheed C-130 Hercules flights within USAFE from temporary duty (TDY) units on a rotational basis from the Continental United States.

In addition to the logistics mission, the 513th MAW was responsible for operations of four Boeing EC-135H Flying Command Posts of the 10th Airborne Command and Control Squadron, which would have been responsible for U.S. European Command command and control ("Operation Silk Purse") in the event of a war with the Soviet Union. In addition, for many years, variants of Boeing RC-135 reconnaissance aircraft were observed regularly at Mildenhall. Most of those aircraft came from the 55th Strategic Reconnaissance Wing at Offut AFB, Nebraska. Those aircraft were used to fly ELINT and COMINT missions along the borders of Poland, the Soviet Union and Czechoslovakia, monitoring and recording military communications.

Mildenhall also hosted Lockheed SR-71 Blackbirds from Detachment 4, 9th Strategic Reconnaissance Wing at Beale AFB, California. Besides photo reconnaissance flights, the SR-71s at Mildenhall were involved in ELINT missions that were carried out within the framework of the SALT I Agreement of 1972. Under this agreement, the U.S. and Soviet Union reached agreement on a partial freeze on the number of nuclear weapons and these flights were to verify that the Soviets were adhering to the agreement.

Telemetry gathering missions were also flown by the SR-71s to record data from Soviet rocket systems. Electronic gathering flights were primarily aimed at gathering signals from the Soviet missile center at Plesetsk. This information, along with information being gathered from spy satellites, enabled the Defense Intelligence Agency to assemble a good picture of Soviet activities. SR-71s at Mildenhall also played a key role in the 1986 Operation El Dorado Canyon involving American retaliatory action in Libya. The day after the attack, SR-71s made several unmolested flights over the bombed military targets around Tripoli and Benghazi.

== Post-Cold War drawdown ==
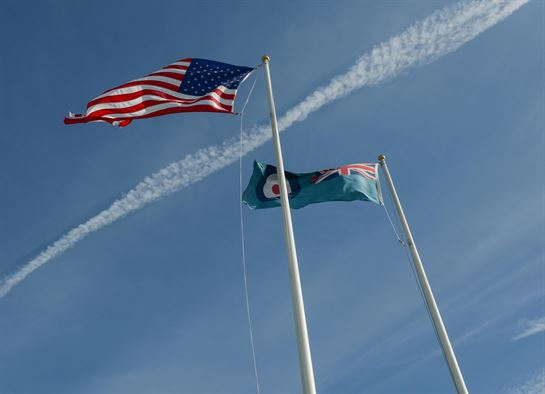
The flags of the United States and Royal Air Force flying at RAF Fairford.

With the fall of the Berlin Wall in 1989 and the collapse of the Soviet Union in 1991, the need for large numbers of USAF forces in the UK no longer existed and plans were made for significant cuts.

The bases at Bentwaters, Woodbridge, Chicksands, Greenham Common, Sculthorpe, Wethersfield and Upper Heyford were closed by the end of 1993. Alconbury's flightline was closed and its base support functions were taken over by RAF Molesworth.

In January 2015 the US Department of Defense announced through their European Infrastructure Consolidation programme that they would be withdrawing from RAF Mildenhall, and activities at RAF Alconbury and RAF Molesworth would be moved to RAF Croughton. In 2020 it was announced that Mildenhall would remain open.

The USAF also maintains a communications station at RAF Croughton, and at RAF Menwith Hill is a National Security Agency electronic intelligence gathering installation.

== USAF bases in the United Kingdom ==
- RAF Alconbury (USAFE)
  - 7560th Air Base Group (ABG) (1953–1959)
  - 10th Tactical Reconnaissance Wing /Tactical Fighter Wing (1959–1994)
  - 423d Air Base Group (1995– )
- RAF Barford St John
  - Detachment 1, 2130th Communications Squadron (AFCS) (1960-1992)
  - 422d ABG (1993– )
- RAF Bentwaters/RAF Woodbridge (USAFE) *
  - 79th Fighter Squadron (FS) (1952–1970) (RAF Woodbridge)
  - 81st Tactical Fighter Wing (TFW) (1951–1993)
    (RAF Bentwaters to 1958, Bentwaters/Woodbridge to 1993)
- RAF Burtonwood (Air Materiel Command) *
  - 59th Air Depot Wing (1948–1965)
- RAF Blenheim Crescent (EOARDS/USAFE)
  - 422d Air Base Group (2007– )
- RAF Chelveston (SAC/USAFE) *
  - SAC Reflex Base (1952–1959)
  - 42d Tactical Reconnaissance Squadron/10th Tactical Reconnaissance Wing (1959–1962)
- RAF Chicksands (USAFSS) *
  - 10th Radio Sq (1950–1951)
  - 7534th Air Base Squadron (ABS) (1951–58)
  - 6950th Radio/Security Gp (1958–1978)
  - 7274th Air Base Group (1978–1993)
- RAF Croughton (USAFE)
  - 1969th Communications Squadron (CS) (1950–1955)
  - 1230th Airways and Air Communications
    Service Squadron (AACS) (1955–1961)
  - 2130th Communications Squadron (1961–1971, 1983–1986)
  - 2130th Communications Group (1971–1980, 1986–1993)
  - 2168th Communications Squadron (1980–1983)
  - 630th Communications Squadron (1993–1994)
  - 603d Communications Squadron (1994–1996)
  - 422d Air Base Squadron (1996–2005)
  - 422d Air Base Group (2005– )
- RAF Fairford (SAC/USAFE)
  - 7507th Air Base Group (1950–1952)
  - 3919th Air Base Group (1952–1964)
  - 7020th Air Base Group (1979–1989)
  - 11th Strategic Group (1984–1992)
  - 420th Air Base Group (2004– )
- RAF Feltwell (USSC)
  - 5th SSS/21st SW

- RAF Greenham Common (SAC/USAFE) *
  - 7501st Air Base Squadron (1951–1953)
  - 3909th Air Base / Combat Support Group (1953–1964)
  - 7551st Combat Support Group (CSG) (1964–1978)
  - OLA, 20th TFW (1976–1979)
  - 501 TMW (1982–1991)
- RAF Lakenheath (SAC/USAFE)
  - 7460th BCS (1948–1949)
  - 7504th ABG (1949–1953)
  - 3913th ABS (1953–1955)
  - 3910th ABG (1955–1960)
  - 99th ADS (1959–1960)
  - 48th FW (1960– )
- RAF Manston (USAFE) *
  - 123d FBG (1951–52)
  - 406th FIW (1952–1958)
- RAF Little Rissington (USAFE) *
  - 870th Contingency Hospital (1981–93)
  - 20th TFW (1981–93) accommodation for RAF Upper Heyford
- RAF Menwith Hill
- RAF Mildenhall (SAC/USAFE/AMC)
  - 7511th ABG (1950–1955)
  - 3913th ABG (1955–1959)
  - 7513th ABG (1959–1966)
  - 513th MAW (1966 – )
  - 100th ARW (1992 – )
- RAF Molesworth (SAC/USAFE)
  - 582d Air Resupply Group (1951–1956)
  - 482d Troop Carrier Sq (1956–1957)
  - 303d TMW (1986–1989)
  - 423d ABG (1989– )
- RAF Sculthorpe (SAC) *
  - 47th BW (1952–1962)
- RAF Shepherds Grove (USAFE) *
  - 116th/78th FBS (1951–1958)
- RAF Upper Heyford (SAC/USAFE) *
  - 7509th ABS (1950–1951)
  - 7509th ABG (1951–1952)
  - 3918th ABG (1952–1958)
  - 3918th CSG (1958–1964)
  - 3918th SW (1964–1966)
  - 66th TFW (1966–1970)
  - 20th TFW (1970–1993)
- RAF Upwood (USAFE) *
  - 10th TRW/TFW/ABW (1959–1994)
  - 423d ABG (1995– )
- RAF Welford (USAFE)
  - 7531st Ammunition Squadron (1955-59)
  - 3115th Ammunition Supply Sq./ASUPS (1959-62)
  - 7234th ASUPS (1962-72)
  - 7551st ASUPS (1972-86)
  - 850th Munitions Maint. Squadron (1986-93)
  - Det. 1, 100th Regional Spt. Grp. (1993-2005)
  - 420th ABG (2005– )
- RAF Wethersfield (USAFE) *
  - 20th TFW (1951–1970)

- * Inactive Operating Base
- AFCC: Air Force Communications Command
- AFSS: Air Force Space Command
- USAFSS: Air Force Security Service

== See also ==
- List of Royal Air Force stations
- United States Air Forces in Europe
- Strategic Air Command in the United Kingdom
