= RAF South Ruislip =

Non-flying Air Force station

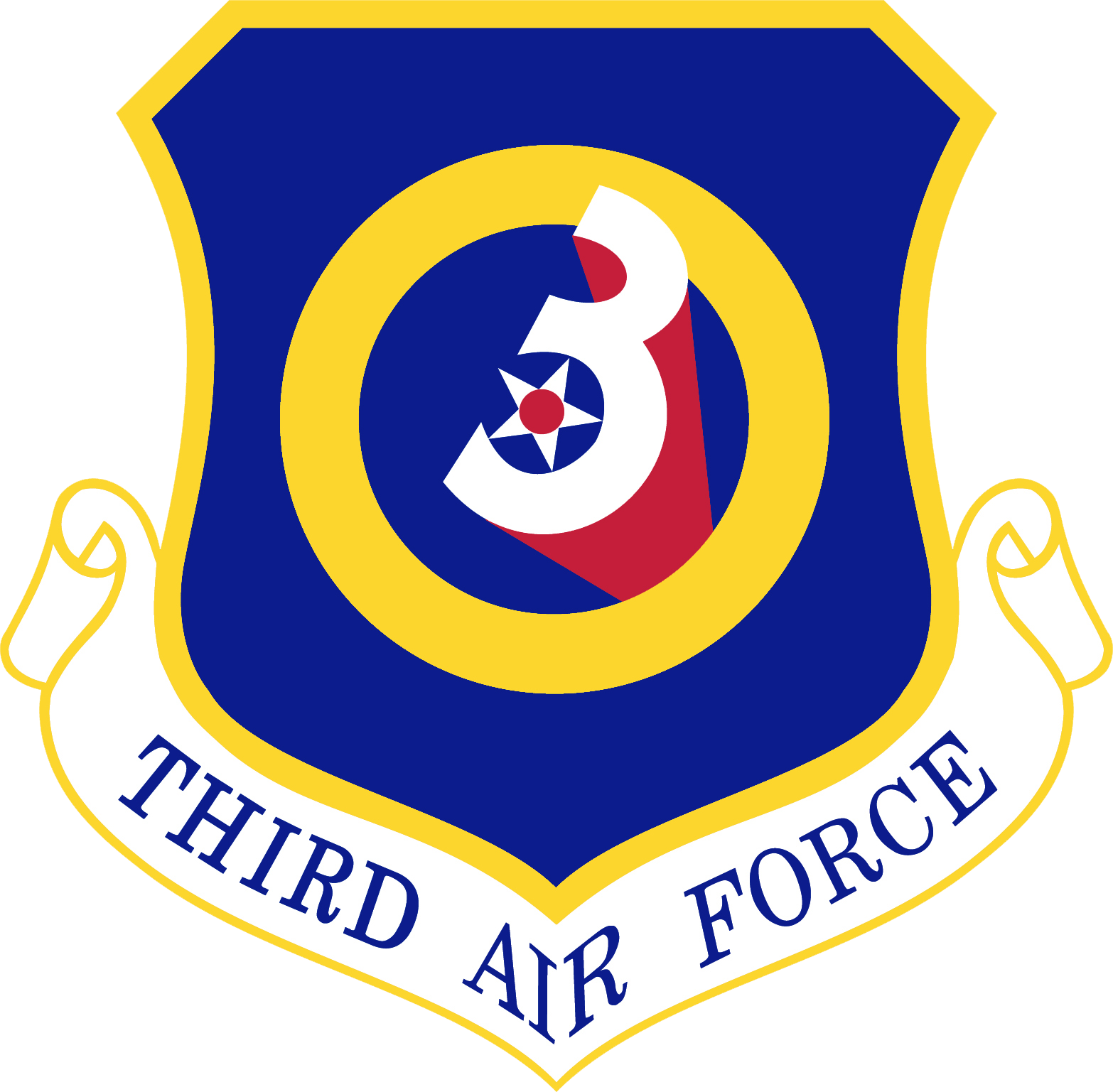
RAF South Ruislip
- South Ruislip, Middlesex, England
- Entrance to the base

Site information
- Type: Military headquarters
- Condition: Site redeveloped

Location
- Coordinates: 51°33′21″N 00°22′57″W

Site history
- Built: 1948-49
- Demolished: 1995

Garrison information
- Occupants: Third Air Force

RAF South Ruislip, also known as South Ruislip Air Station, was a non-flying Air Force station located in South Ruislip near London, England. Located close to RAF Northolt, the station was used by the United States Air Force's Third Air Force from 1949 until 1972, when the headquarters were moved to RAF Mildenhall.

== History ==
The station opened in April 1949 and was leased by the United States Air Force as an administrative station to coordinate Third Air Force (USAFE) and 7th Air Division activities in Great Britain with the British Government. The site was leased from the Ministry of Defence. Logistical and support functions were located at RAF West Ruislip, leased by the United States Navy from the Ministry of Defence. All flying support was located at RAF Northolt that was supported by Detachment 1, 66th Tactical Reconnaissance Wing and later by Detachment 1, 20th Tactical Fighter Wing. The site included the 7520th U.S. Air Force Hospital.

A school for the children of American service personnel was established at RAF Eastcote in the 1950s, later joined by other welfare facilities. In 1970, American teenagers Dewey Bunnell, Dan Peek and Gerry Beckley, whose fathers were stationed at the base, formed the folk rock group America.

The total number of staff employed at the station had reached 1,733, including 487 British civilians, and the remainder made up of US Air Force personnel and civilians.

=== Closure ===
The derelict site photographed in 1995

In 1972 the Third Air Force moved operations from the station to RAF Mildenhall. The Ministry of Transport used portions of the base for records storage in the mid-1970's. Thereafter, the buildings that had formed the main part of the base on Victoria Road stood empty until they were demolished in 1995, but were used by the BBC as a filming location for the final series of the television police drama Z Cars between 1977 and 1978. Retail units have been built on the site of the former base since its demolition.

== See also ==
- List of former Royal Air Force stations
