= RAF Eastcote =

Former Royal Air Force site in London

RAF Eastcote
- Eastcote, Middlesex in England
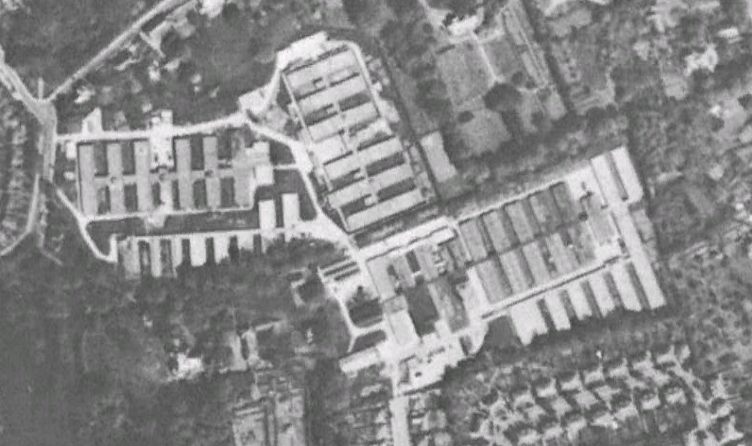
- The site photographed in 1945

Site information
- Type: Military accommodation, welfare, armoury, communications
- Owner: Ministry of Defence
- Operator: Royal Air Force
- Condition: Demolished

Location
- Shown within Greater London
- Coordinates: 51°34′56″N 000°24′21″W

Site history
- Built: c.1943
- In use: 1943-2007
- Demolished: 2008

Garrison information
- Occupants: GCHQ, General Post Office, United States Air Force

RAF Eastcote, also known over time as RAF Lime Grove, HMS Pembroke V and Outstation Eastcote, was a UK Ministry of Defence site in Eastcote, Middlesex.

The British government first used the site during the Second World War, constructing a military hospital in preparation for casualties from the D-Day landings. They were not required for the purpose and later became an outstation of the Bletchley Park codebreaking operations. During this time, Royal Air Force technicians and Navy Wrens supported the operations. The outstation closed soon after the end of the war, though became the first headquarters of Government Communications Headquarters (GCHQ), when the Bletchley Park codebreaking operations, including two Colossus computers, were moved there and renamed in 1946. These remained at Eastcote until 1954 when the new agency moved to its purpose-built headquarters in Cheltenham.

Other buildings on the site were used by the General Post Office and to support the United States Air Forces in Europe's (USAFE) Third Air Force and 7th Air Division (SAC) activities at RAF South Ruislip.

As part of the Ministry of Defence's Project MoDEL, the site became surplus to military requirements and was sold in 2007 to be redeveloped for new housing. The site was cleared in 2008 and a total of 385 new homes were approved for construction. The name for the development, Pembroke Park, was chosen to reflect the heritage of the site.

== History ==
Entrance to the site from the intersection of Lime Grove and Kent Gardens

Before coming under the ownership of the British Government, the land the site was built on was mainly open fields. A public footpath dating from around 1565 crossed the area from Eastcote High Road to Field End Road. In 1911, cricket matches were played on the field by the Eastcote Institute.

During the Second World War, the land was requisitioned by the government from the owners, Telling Brothers. The first buildings on the site were constructed for use as a military hospital in preparation for military casualties from the Normandy landings. Subsequently, it became clear they would not be required for that purpose and became barracks for Navy Wrens.

An outpost to Bletchley Park was established at the Eastcote site, known during the Second World War as HMS Pembroke V, to house some of the Bombe codebreaker machines used to decode German Enigma messages. A total of 100 machines were operated at Eastcote, controlled by 800 Wrens and 100 RAF technicians. A detachment of American personnel were stationed in a separate area, operating their own Bombe machines.

The site was split into two blocks: A and B. Block A was sited near Lime Grove and housed personnel accommodation and administrative services, while Block B was protected by brick walls and military police since it contained the codebreaking computers. The public footpath passed between the two blocks. The level of security meant that support staff in the administrative block did not know of the activities in Block B, nor did local residents.

At the end of the war in 1945, the Bombes were dismantled by the Wrens to be recycled, maintaining the secrecy of the operations. The operations at Bletchley Park under the name "Government Code and Cypher School" (GC&CS) moved to Eastcote on 1 April 1946. The Crown purchased the estate in 1947. Eastcote's proximity to London meant staff were not far from Whitehall, and the site became known as the "London Signals Intelligence Centre". Six years later, in July 1952, GC&CS became "Government Communications Headquarters" (GCHQ) and began to move from Eastcote to new purpose-built buildings in Cheltenham. The move was completed in February 1954.

In 1949 the United States Air Force established a non-flying base at RAF South Ruislip to coordinate the USAFE's Third Air Force and 7th Air Division (SAC) activities in Great Britain with the British Government. A school for the children of American service personnel was established on the Eastcote site in the 1950s. In the 1960s, this was joined by veterinary, dental, and mental health clinics, and also by a morgue. The United States military continued to use buildings on the site until the closure in 2007.

Between 1954 and 1977 the London Communications-Electronic Security Agency was based at Eastcote.

== Redevelopment ==
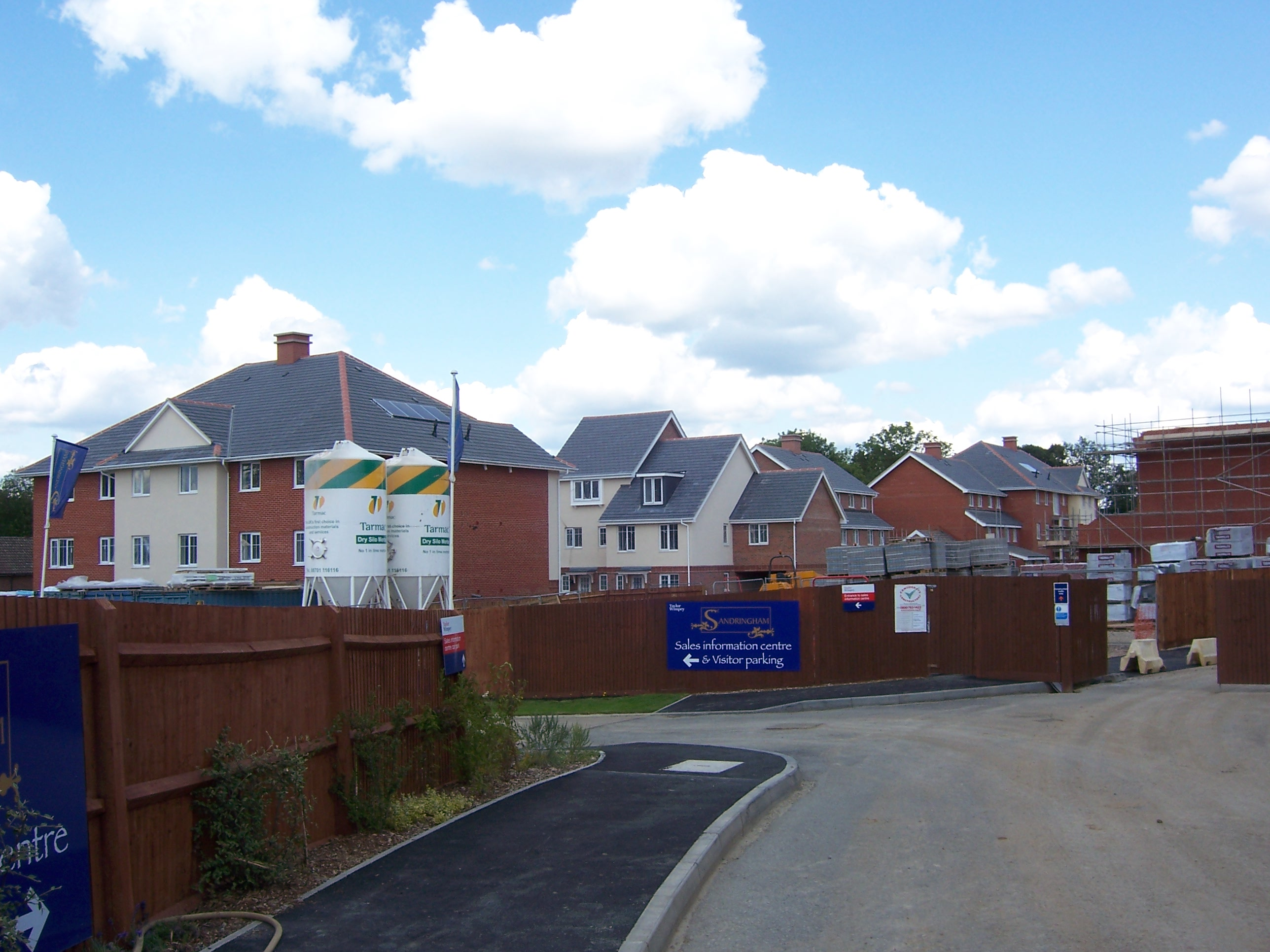
New housing under construction on the site

The 19-acre (77,000 m^{2}) site was the first to be sold as part of the Ministry of Defence's Project MoDEL (Ministry of Defence Estates London), a programme to reduce the number of military sites in the Greater London area. George Wimpey purchased the site in 2007, planning to build 385 new homes. The entire site was cleared in 2008 and building commenced.

George Wimpey became Taylor Wimpey through a corporate merger and submitted an application in 2010 to build a further 15 homes on the site. A report by the London Borough of Hillingdon's planning department rejected the proposal in December that year on the grounds that the site was already overdeveloped. Local residents had raised this concern in November that year, which the leader of the council explained was out of the council's control due to planning laws.

The development was named "Pembroke Park" in recognition of the heritage of the site; roads and the play area also received names related to the wartime codebreaking that went on there.
