= RAF Bentley Priory =

Royal Air Force station in the London Borough of Harrow

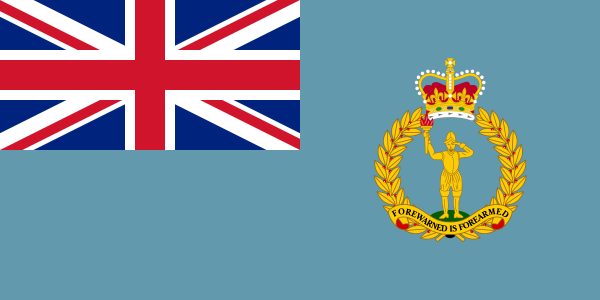
RAF Bentley Priory
- Stanmore, Harrow, Greater London in England
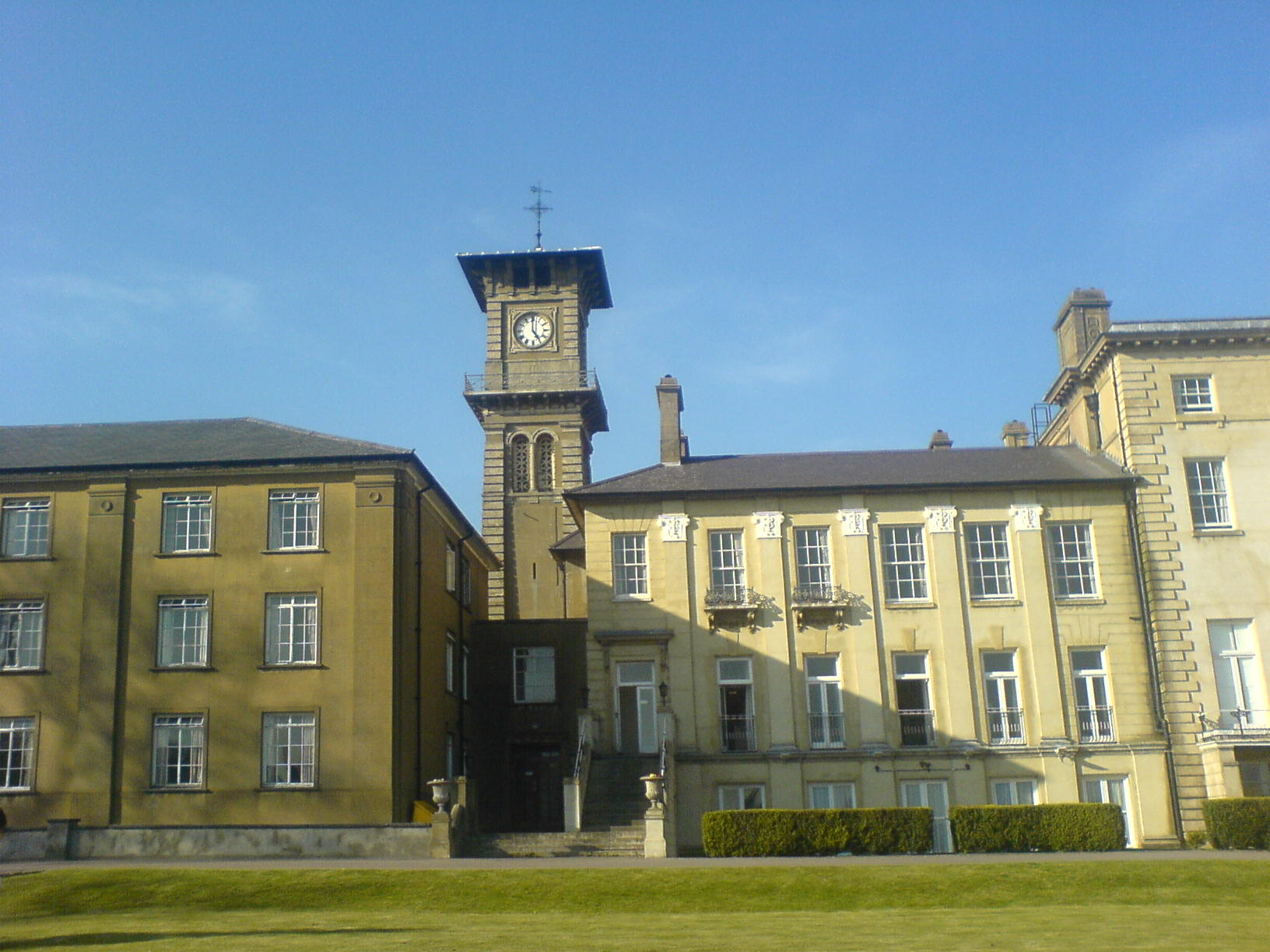
- The Officers' Mess (now a museum) from the Italian Gardens

Site information
- Type: Non-flying administrative station
- Owner: Ministry of Defence
- Operator: Royal Air Force
- Condition: Closed
- Website: Bentley Priory Museum

Location
- Location in London Borough of Harrow
- Coordinates: 51°37′35.94″N 0°20′3.24″W

Site history
- Built: 1766
- In use: 1936–2008
- Fate: Converted to residential use. Former Officers' Mess now the Bentley Priory Museum.
- Battles/wars: Battle of Britain (Jul–Oct 1940); Air Offensive, Europe (1942–1945); Cold War (1946–1991)

Garrison information
- Past commanders: Air Chief Marshal Sir Hugh Dowding; 25 November 1940 – Air Marshal Sir Sholto Douglas; 28 November 1942 – Air Marshal Sir Trafford Leigh-Mallory; 15 November 1943 – Air Marshal Sir Roderic Hill; 14 May 1945 – Air Marshal Sir James Robb; 17 November 1947 – Air Marshal Sir William Elliot; 19 April 1949 – Air Marshal Sir Basil Embry; 7 April 1953 – Air Marshal Sir Dermot Boyle; 1 January 1956 – Air Marshal Sir Hubert Patch; 8 August 1956 – Air Marshal Sir Thomas Pike; 30 July 1959 – Air Marshal Sir Hector McGregor; 18 May 1962 – Air Marshal Sir Douglas Morris; 3 March 1966 – Air Marshal Sir Frederick Rosier
- Garrison: RAF Fighter Command; HQ Royal Observer Corps; No. 11/18 Group Strike Command RAF

Listed Building – Grade II*
- Designated: 25 May 1983
- Reference no.: 1358638

National Register of Historic Parks and Gardens
- Type: Grade II
- Designated: 9 December 1999
- Reference no.: 1001440

RAF Bentley Priory was a non-flying Royal Air Force station near Stanmore in the London Borough of Harrow. It was the headquarters of Fighter Command in the Battle of Britain and throughout the Second World War. The Royal Air Force station closed its operations on 30 May 2008, with all units relocating to new accommodation at RAF Northolt, a few miles away.

The station incorporated Bentley Priory, which was originally built in 1766. Since its closure, the Officers' Mess has converted into the Bentley Priory Museum with exhibits focusing on the house's role in the Battle of Britain. The grounds have been redeveloped as a private residential housing estate.

== History ==
=== Early history ===
In early 1926, the Bentley Priory estate, which dates from 1766, was broken up and the Priory building and 40 acres (comprising the present grounds) were sold to the Air Ministry for a sum thought to be about £25,000.

On 26 May 1926, Air Defence of Great Britain (ADGB) was formed at Hillingdon House, at RAF Uxbridge. The formation was radically reorganized with the creation of Bomber, Coastal, Fighter and Training Commands. The existing ADGB was dissolved and RAF Fighter Command emerged on 14 July 1936. It left Hillingdon House, at RAF Uxbridge, on this date and moved to Bentley Priory with its first Air Officer Commanding Air Chief Marshal Sir Hugh Dowding. Fighter Command Headquarters remained at the Priory until its merger with the other operational commands in 1968.

A poem translated from Thomas Gray's 'Luna Habitabilis' (Cambridge 1797) is associated with the Priory. A copy of the poem was given to the air officer commanding 11 Group on 22 November 1989 by the Rt Hon The Lord Harvington, who stated that he had intended reading it out to the House of Commons at the end of the Battle of Britain, but the copy had been lost. At the time Harvington was wing commander in the RAuxAF and Conservative member for St Pancras North. He felt it appropriate to quote this 18th-century prophecy:

"The time will come, when thou shalt lift thine eyes,
To watch a long drawn battle in the skies,
While aged peasants, too amazed for words,
Stare at the flying fleets of wond'rous birds,
England so long the mistress of the sea,
Where winds and waves confess her sovereignty,
Her ancient triumph yet on high shall bear,
And reign, the sovereign of the conquered air."

=== Fighter Command ===
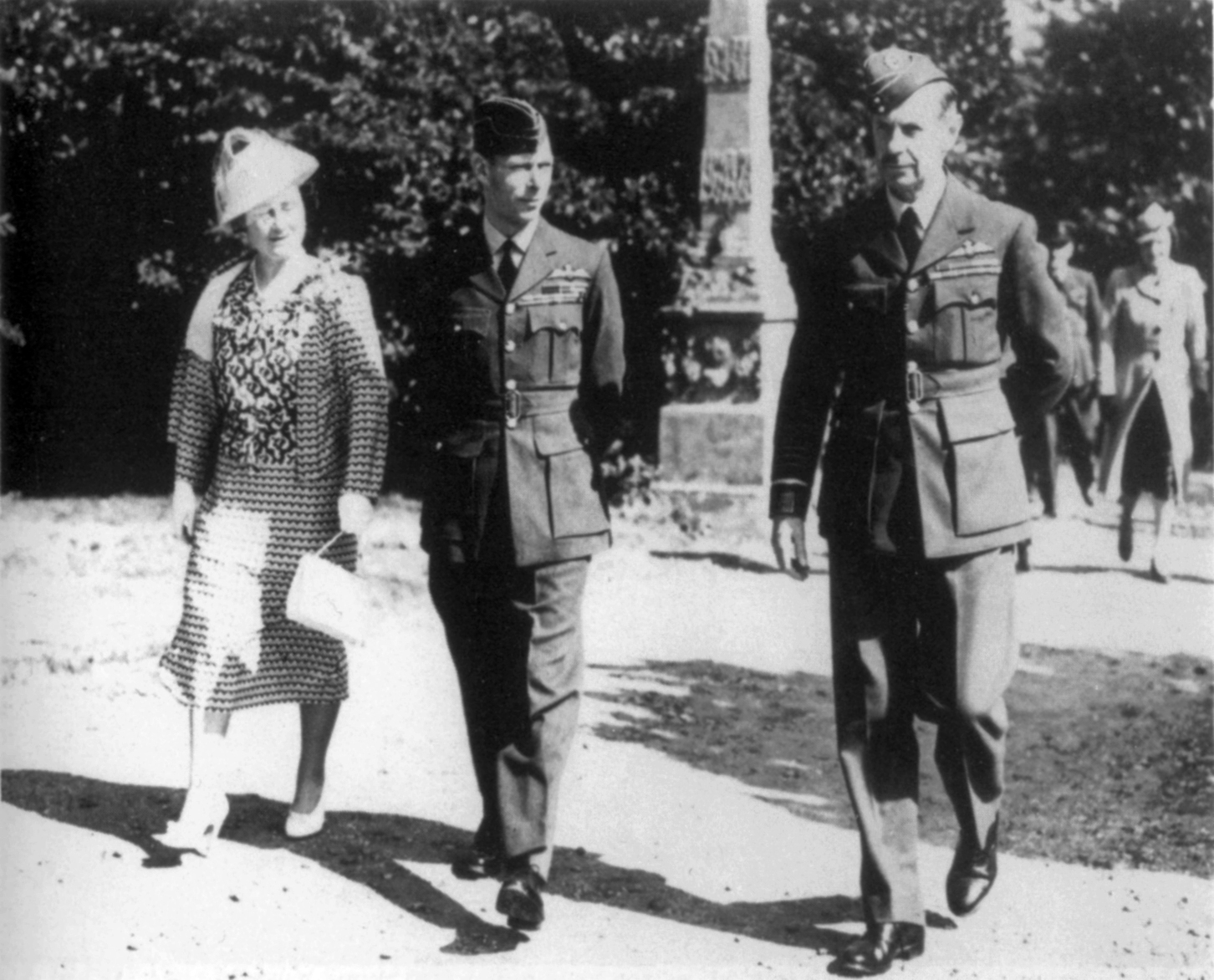
Air Chief Marshal Sir Hugh Dowding accompanying King George VI and Queen Elizabeth during a visit to Bentley Priory in September 1940.

RAF Fighter Command operated under Air Chief Marshal Sir Hugh Dowding with Air Commodore A D John Cunningham as his Senior Air Staff Officer (SASO) and Air Commodore Napier John Gill as Air Officer Administration (AOA).

Because of his brilliant detailed preparation of Britain's air defences for the German assault, and his prudent management of his resources during the battle, Dowding is today generally given the credit for Britain's victory in the Battle of Britain. Dowding's time leading Fighter Command left a lasting legacy on the organisation. His creation of the Operations and Filter Rooms, the essential elements of the Command, Control and Communications system, became the cornerstone of the Air Defence System. The system he developed gave air controllers the best chance of scrambling fighter squadrons to intercept Luftwaffe raids before they reached their targets. This rapid, flexible approach was essential because there were insufficient aircraft and crews to keep fighter patrols continuously airborne in 1940. He also played a significant part in encouraging research into night-fighter equipment and tactics. Historian and Dowding biographer, Robert Wright, who served as Dowding's personal assistant in the Battle of Britain, wrote in his book, Dowding and the Battle of Britain, that even when faced with threats of retirement and constant rebuttal, Dowding continued to give his all to those under him and the RAF service. Dowding noted in a letter Air Ministry in early March 1940, that:

"Apart from the question of discourtesy, which I do not wish to stress, I must point out the lack of consideration involved in delaying a proposal to this nature until ten days before the date of retirement. I have had four retiring dates given to me and now you are proposing a fifth. Before the War, as I told S of S, I should have been glad to retire: now I am anxious to stay, because I feel that there is no one else who will fight as I do when proposals are made which would reduce the Defence Forces of the Country below extreme danger point."

Dowding's subsequent downfall has been attributed by some to his single-mindedness and perceived lack of diplomacy and political savoir faire in dealing with intra-RAF challenges and intrigues, most obviously the still, even now, hotly debated Big Wing controversy in which a number of senior and active service officers had argued in favour of large set-piece air battles with the Luftwaffe as an alternative to Dowding's successful Fabian strategy. Another reason often cited for his removal, but characterised by some contemporary commentators more as a pretext, was the difficulty of countering German nighttime bombing raids on British cities.

Bentley Priory continued to act as the Headquarters of Fighter Command throughout the Second World War. It assumed additional importance as the Air planning headquarters for D-Day, as the planning for the full operation was conducted at HMS Dryad near Portsmouth, with Montgomery, Eisenhower and Churchill attending a nearby church the evening before the assault. Much of the detailed air planning work was carried out at Kestrel Grove just a few hundred yards away (this building still stands and is now a retirement home). On D-Day, the landings were monitored by King George VI, Winston Churchill and U.S. General Dwight D. Eisenhower in the Allied Expeditionary Air Force War room in the Priory's underground bunker.

=== Anti-Aircraft Command ===
On 1 April 1939, HQ Anti-Aircraft Command (AAC) was formed under General Alan Brooke, but on 28 July 1939, he was suddenly moved to command the British Forces and General Sir Frederick Alfred Pile took over. Anti-Aircraft Command then moved to "Glenthorn" in the grounds of Bentley Priory.

=== Wellington crash ===
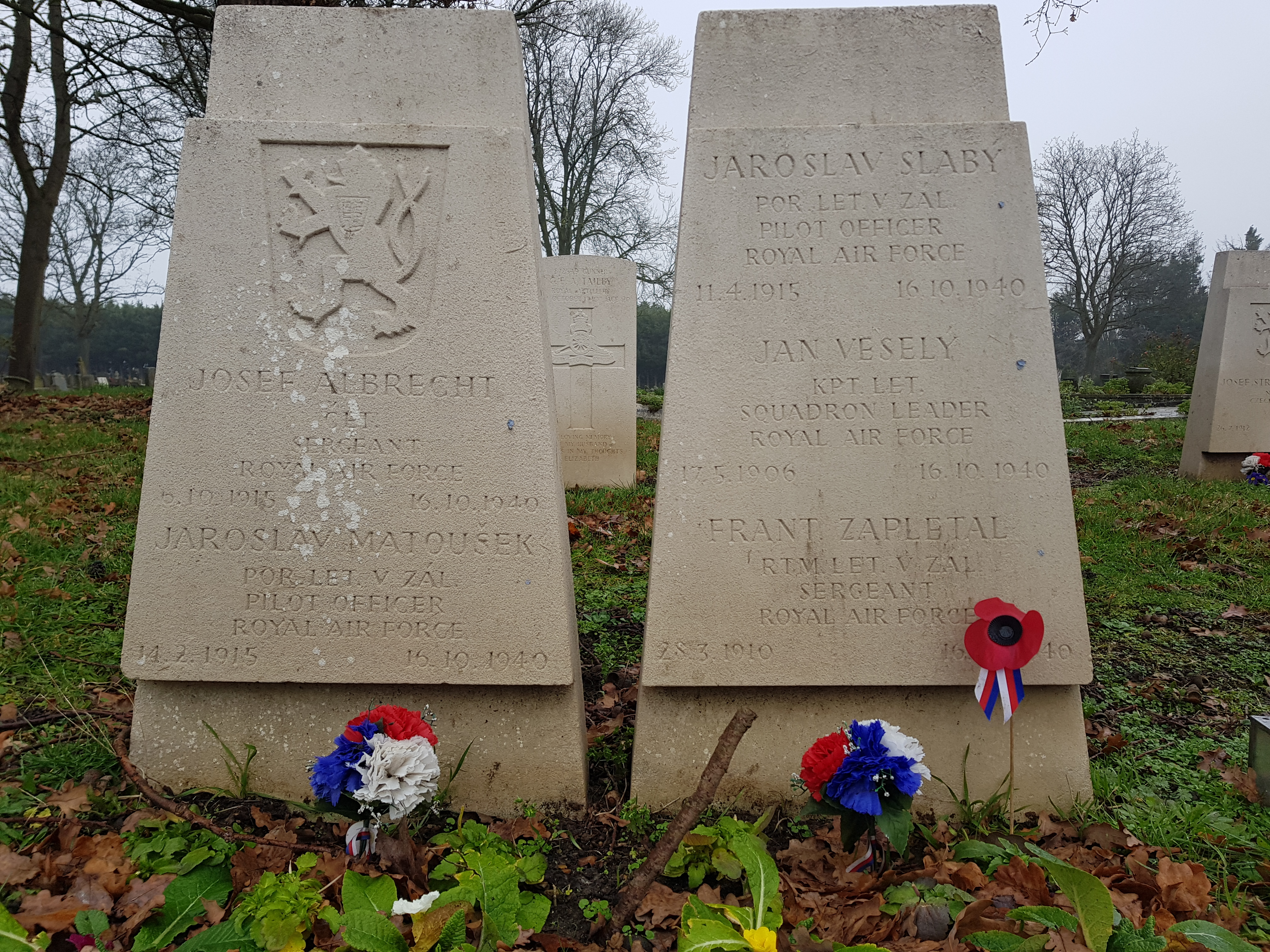
Shared grave in Pinner New Cemetery of the five Free Czechoslovak airmen whose Wellington crashed at Bentley Priory in 1940

On 16 October 1940 a Vickers Wellington of the Czechoslovak-crewed No. 311 Squadron RAF collided with a cable of one of the barrage balloons protecting Bentley Priory. The aircraft had been on a bombing mission from RAF East Wretham to Kiel, but suffered icing and the failure of its compass and radio and was badly off-course. The Wellington crash resulted in the death of five of its six crew. They were buried in a single shared grave, 4 miles (6.4 km) from Bentley Priory, at Pinner New Cemetery. The tail gunner survived with serious burns. He later retrained as a fighter pilot and served with No. 312 (Czechoslovak) Squadron RAF.

=== Airstrip ===
With the requirement for frequent high-level meetings the need for an airstrip at Bentley Priory grew. Air Commodore Richard Atcherley undertook this project in late 1943. The Air Ministry War Department advised him that it would take six months to construct two 300-yard (270 m) strips, so he approached the United States Army Air Forces. Cinder landing strips were laid in just four days.

=== Royal Observer Corps ===
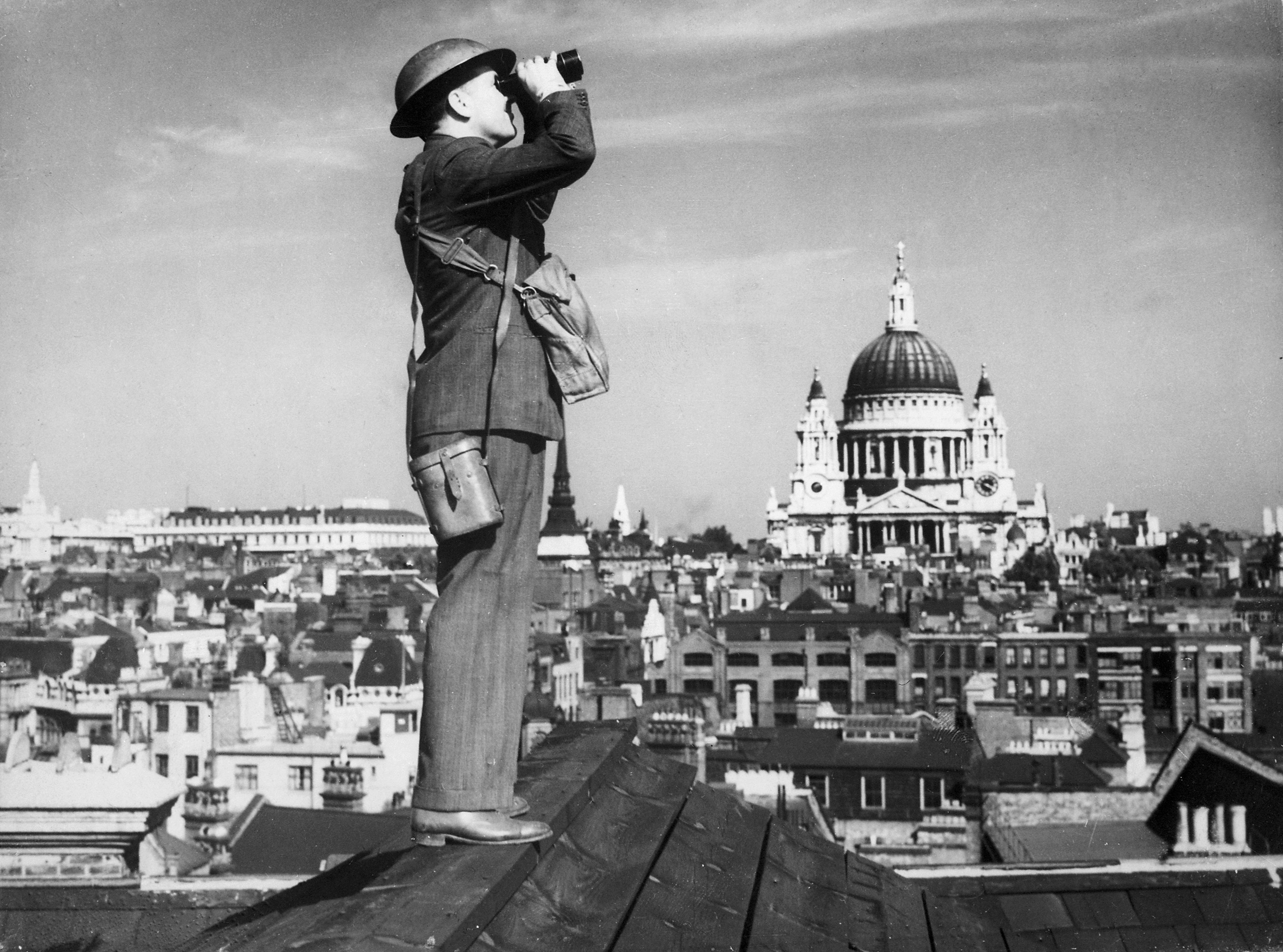
Observer Corps aircraft spotter in central London in World War II, stood on a Fleet Street rooftop with St Paul's Cathedral in the background.

The Observer Corps moved to RAF Bentley Priory from its original location at RAF Uxbridge, along with Dowding and Fighter Command, in July 1936 and remained at the Priory until it was stood down in December 1995. The Observer Corps was one of the cornerstones of Lord Dowding's air defence system and he said later in his despatch following the conclusion of the Battle of Britain:

"at this time they (the Observer Corps) constituted the whole means of tracking enemy raids once they had crossed the coastline. Their work throughout was quite invaluable. Without it the air-raid warning systems could not have been operated and inland interceptions would rarely have been made."

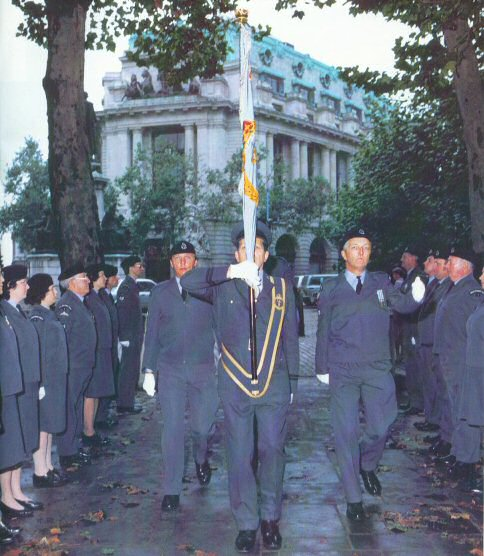
ROC Banner is marched into St Clement Danes church, London for laying up on 29 September 1991.

When the Corps' first Commandant Edward Masterman stood down in April 1936, Alfred Warrington-Morris replaced him and took control of the Observer Corps in the important period immediately prior to the Second World War. He oversaw the move of HQ Observer Corps to Bentley Priory and the Corps' adoption by RAF Fighter Command. He also controlled the Corps during the memorable events of the Battle of Britain and was still at the helm when the Observer Corps was granted the title Royal to become the Royal Observer Corps and became a uniformed branch of the RAF in April 1941. Warrington-Morris was Mentioned in dispatches in July 1940.

Initially the Observer Corps' presence at Bentley Priory included not only the small headquarters' staff of a dozen officers and support staff but also around sixty spare time observers who filled essential plotting tasks in the Bentley Priory operations rooms. In 1955 the observers relocated to a new dedicated ROC operations centre in nearby Watford.

The Royal Observer Corps was stood down on 30 September 1991 and, in 1992, a Royal Observer Corps stained glass window to mark the 50th anniversary of the Battle of Britain, was installed in the officers' mess at RAF Bentley Priory. The original Royal Banner, presented in 1966, was laid up at St Clement Danes Church in the Strand in 1991. A new banner, presented by Elizabeth II at Bentley Priory in July 1991, was laid up at the Rotunda at the RAF College Cranwell in Lincolnshire.

=== Post-war operations ===
Princess Elizabeth first visited the Priory in November 1950. On 30 April 1968, Fighter Command was amalgamated with other operational commands to form Strike Command. Bentley Priory also became the Administrative Headquarters for RAF Strike Command, although this function moved to High Wycombe in 1972.

=== Fire ===
In the evening of 21 June 1979 a major fire destroyed most of the main staircase as well the Dowding Room. Cubitts had been carrying out refurbishment work and the company's insurance policy covered most of the repair work, which cost £3.1 million.

=== Closure ===
RAF Bentley Priory was latterly home to the Defence Aviation Safety Centre, Air Historical Branch (AHB) and RAF Ceremonial. As there was no enduring operational use for RAF Bentley Priory, however, the Ministry of Defence (MoD) released the site as part of its Greater London estate consolidation project, Project MoDEL (Ministry of Defence Estates London).

Project MoDEL is making a major contribution to the consolidation of the Defence Estate in Greater London through the delivery of three key outputs: the development of an integrated 'core site' at RAF Northolt; the re-location of the London-based units; and the disposal of surplus sites. Accordingly, DASC, AHB and RAF Ceremonial relocated to RAF Northolt in 2008 following the completion of their new accommodation. A total of £180 million GBP ($295 million US in 2008) of the £300 million GBP released from Project MoDEL has been re-invested back into RAF Northolt.

A final dinner was held for the Battle of Britain veterans in July 2007 to celebrate the role of the building and those who worked in it in preventing Hitler's planned air invasion of Britain in 1940. The sunset ceremony was carried out by the Queen's Colour Squadron and there was a flypast by the Battle of Britain Memorial Flight and a Eurofighter Typhoon. The salute was taken by the Station Commander Squadron Leader Phil Reid, the chief of the Air Staff Air Chief Marshal Sir Glenn Torpy and Air Commodore (Ret) Pete Brothers, Chairman of the Battle of Britain Fighter Association.

The final closure Sunset ceremony took place on 30 May 2008, when the RAF ensign was lowered at RAF Bentley Priory for the last time. The station officially closed the following day, and all remaining lodger units moved to RAF Northolt.

== Bentley Priory Museum ==
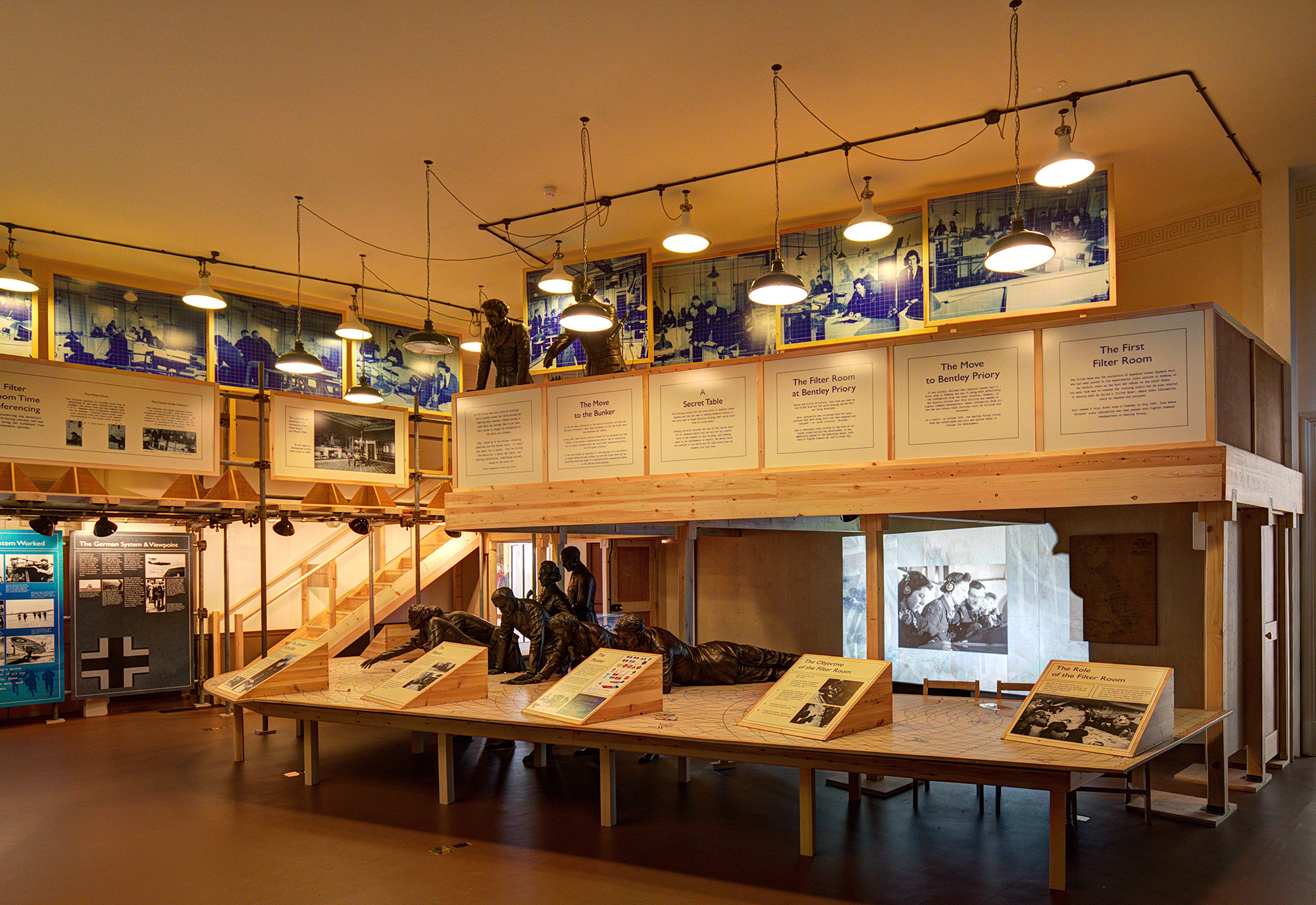
A Battle of Britain museum display at Bentley Priory

The former Bentley Priory Officers' Mess, which became the Bentley Priory Museum in September 2013, includes the original office of Air Chief Marshal Sir Hugh Dowding (later Lord Dowding), Air Officer Commanding-in-Chief Fighter Command in the Battle of Britain, preserved with its original furniture. Other Battle of Britain historic artefacts are kept in the museum, including one of the few remaining Battle of Britain Lace Panels.

Other items in the Museum include a number of "trophies" taken by the Royal Air Force from the Luftwaffe at the end of World War II, including an eagle statue and a bust of Hermann Göring.

The Officers' Mess was also notable for the number of Royal Portraits hanging in the building; there were two of HM The Queen, one in the Dining Room as a young woman and a second that hung in the Ladies' Room that was commissioned and paid for by the Royal Observer Corps to mark their 50th Jubilee Year, painted at Bentley Priory depicting Her Majesty in her ROC Commandant in Chief regalia and with a background of the Italian Gardens. There was also a portrait of His Royal Highness the Duke of Edinburgh (dressed in a flying suit, hanging in the Dining Room on the wall facing the queen), one of George VI (in RAF No 1 uniform wearing a 'chip bag' and wings, which hangs in the Abercorn Bar) and one of the queen mother (gifted to the Mess by the queen mother after she paid for refurbishment following the fire).

== Redevelopment ==
Following the closure of the RAF station, the site was handed over to Defence Estates, who in turn passed it to the prime plus contractor for Project MoDEL, VSM Estates, a company formed by developers Vinci PLC and St. Modwen Properties PLC, who are responsible for developing proposals and the subsequent disposal of the site to developers who will realise the scheme.

Under supplementary planning guidance agreed in 2007 by London Borough of Harrow the site will include a museum open to the public in the main rooms of the house, recording and interpreting the history of the site and in particular the Battle of Britain and Cold War heritage. The plans were put on hold in 2009 as a result of the economic climate in Britain, although in 2010 it was agreed that the museum would go ahead and be run by the Bentley Priory Battle of Britain Trust, with support from the charity The Prince's Regeneration Trust. The plans for the site included the conversion of the grade II* listed mansion into luxury flats, above the museum. The restoration and classical style development for the site was carried out to a design by Nigel Anderson of ADAM Architecture.

On 12 September 2013, the Bentley Priory Museum was officially opened by Prince Charles and the Duchess of Cornwall.

The Cold War bunker was surveyed by English Heritage, who concluded there were other examples of similar bunkers across the country in better condition. In March 2010 the bunker was filled in, leaving only the exterior doors and walls. The RAF Bentley Priory Battle of Britain Trust supported VSM Estates in the decision to fill in the bunker on the grounds of maintenance costs. The bunker had replaced the Second World War bunker in the 1980s.

== See also ==
- List of former Royal Air Force stations
- Bentley Priory Nature Reserve
