= Ark Greenwich Free School =

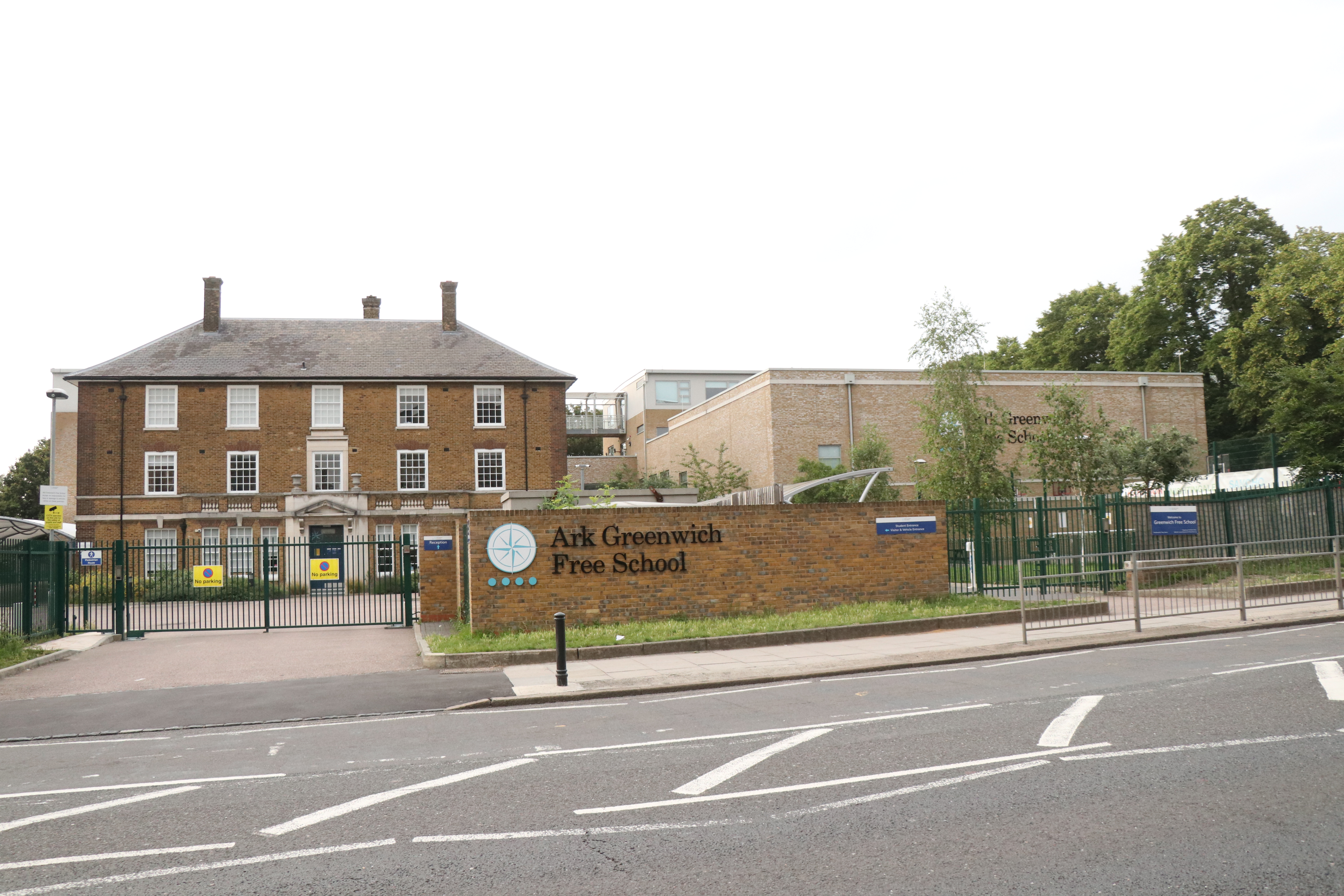

Location
- Adair House; 403 Shooters Hill Road; Woolwich, London, SE18 4LH; England; 51.47186°N 0.0527°E

Information
- Type: Free school
- Established: 2012
- Founders: Jonathan Simons, Tom Shinner and Sarah Jones
- Local authority: Greenwich
- Department for Education URN: 138245 Tables
- Ofsted: Reports
- Chair: Jonathan Simons
- Headteacher: James MacNaughton
- Gender: Co-educational
- Age: 11 to 16
- Enrolment: 577
- Capacity: 560
- Houses: Harrison, Nightingale, Florence, Waugh
- Colours: Red, Green, Blue, Purple
- Website: www.arkgreenwichfreeschool.org

Ark Greenwich Free School is a co-educational secondary free school located in the Woolwich area of the Royal Borough of Greenwich in London, England. The school opened as Greenwich Free School in September 2012 with an initial intake of 11-year-old pupils (academic year 7), with the school expanding admissions every year to eventually become a full secondary school with a sixth form.

The initial headteacher left in 2013 and the school was visited by Ofsted in 2014. Changes were made, and in 2018 the founders relinquished control to the ARK multi-academy trust.

== History ==
The school was co-founded as Greenwich Free School by Jonathan Simons, head of education at the think-tank Policy Exchange, and Tom Shinner, a policy adviser at the Department for Education. Jonathan Simons was the chair of governors. The school was advised by Dr Challoner's Grammar School, where Tom Shinner had been a teacher.

Greenwich Free School offered 100 places per year group, with 97 places being filled for year 7 in 2012. In March 2013 it received 640 applications for its 100 places for year 7. It initially operated an extended school day from 7:50 am to 5:30 pm, which included a homework hour and compulsory extra-curricular activities.

In December 2013, Lee Faith, the school's first headteacher resigned.

The first Ofsted inspection, made in April 2014, assessed that the school required improvement, with strong criticism of the school's teaching of lower-ability, special needs and disabled pupils. Oliver Knight was appointed as the new headteacher on 1 June 2014. At the Ofsted inspection on 17 May 2016, the school's overall effectiveness was judged to be "Good" in all areas.

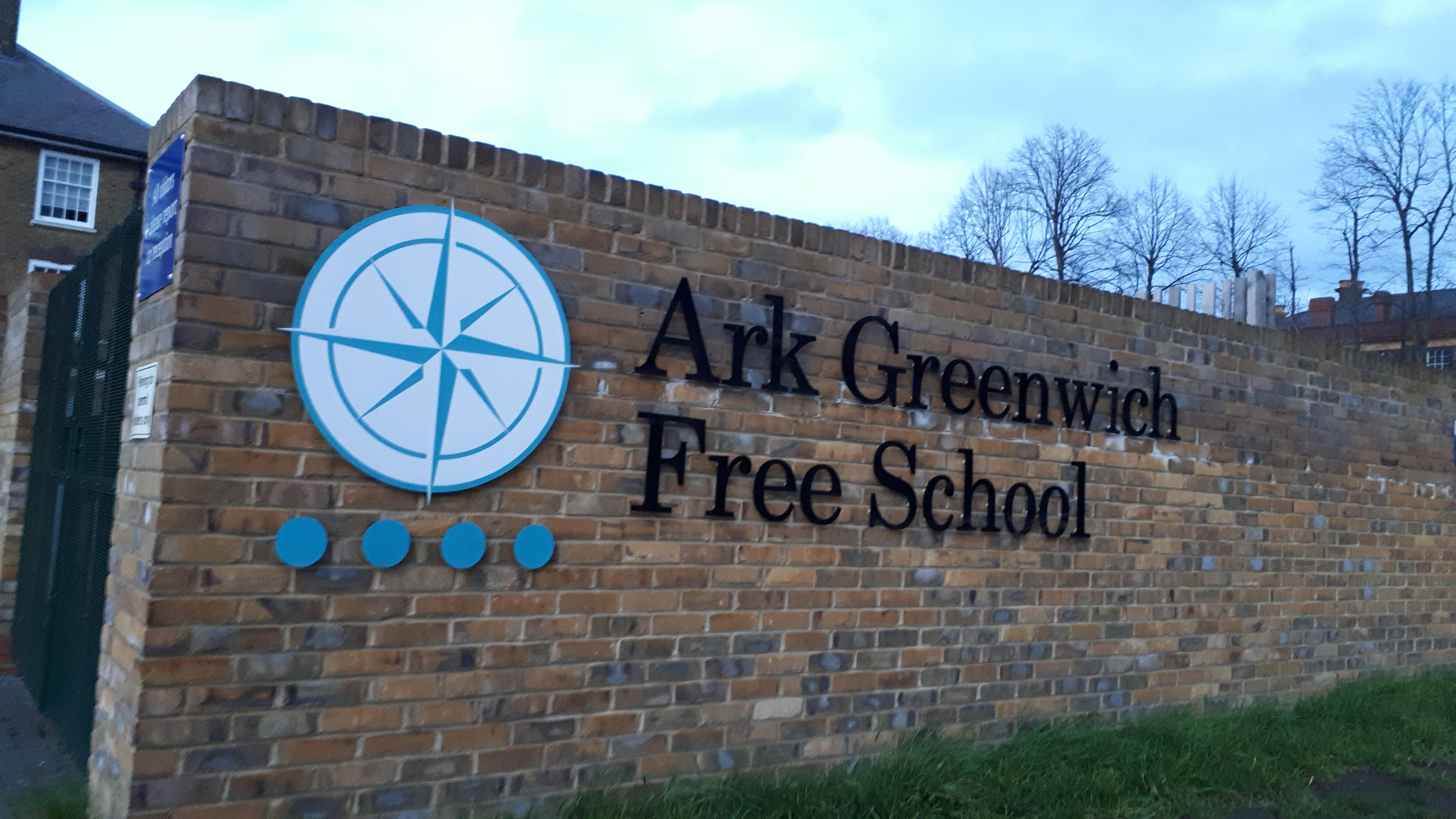
Ark Greenwich Free School

In August 2018 the founders decided to hand the school over to the larger multi-academy trust Ark when it opened for the new school year in September, citing onerous demands on governors and trustees, and was renamed Ark Greenwich Free School.

== Description ==
The school operates an open catchment area, but offers places according to the Fair Banding System operated in Greenwich. The system places pupils in one of the five bands based on their score in tests taken in primary school. The school then allocates 20% of places to pupils in each band. In the event of over-subscription for places, priority is given to pupils living nearest to the school.

From September 2018 it ran a conventional school day from 8:05 am to 3:30 pm, with an extra hour on Mondays and Tuesdays and Wednesdays from the start of the new academic year (2019) - similar to all Greenwich schools. The school operates a strict discipline policy, which includes a ban on pupils having mobile phones and sweets on school grounds.
