= RAF Blenheim Crescent =

Non-flying Royal Air Force station in Ruislip, England

RAF Blenheim Crescent
- Ruislip, Hillingdon, Greater London in England
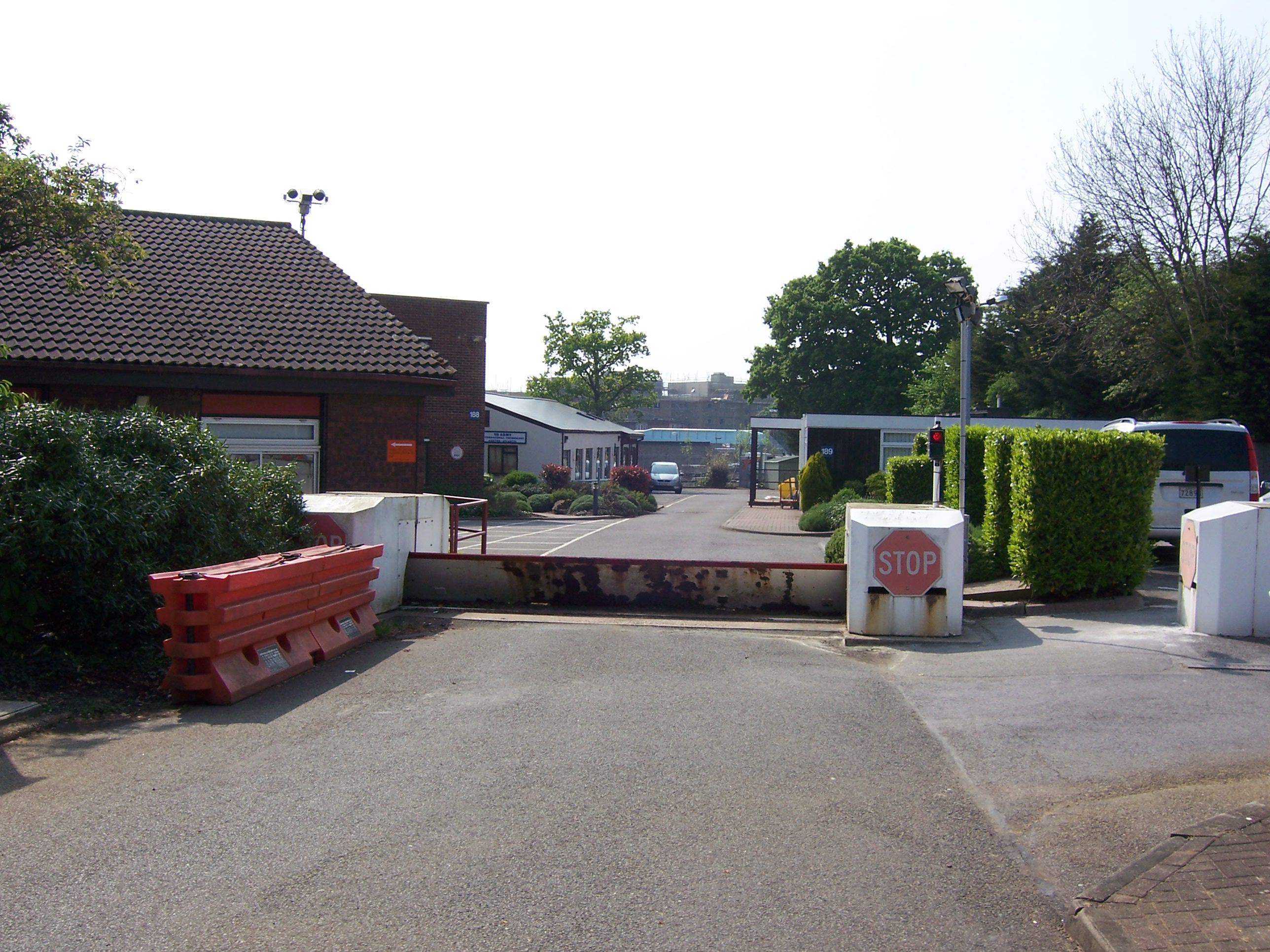
- Entrance to RAF Blenheim Crescent

Site information
- Type: RAF station (US Visiting Forces)
- Owner: Ministry of Defence
- Operator: United States Air Force
- Controlled by: US Air Forces in Europe – Air Forces Africa
- Condition: Operational

Location
- Shown within Greater London
- Coordinates: 51°34′10″N 000°26′01″W

Royal Air Force Blenheim Crescent or more RAF Blenheim Crescent is a non-flying Royal Air Force station, in Ruislip, in Greater London, England, presently used by the United States military for administration.

== Units ==
The site was originally leased to the United States Navy but transferred to the United States Air Force in October 2007. The primary units assigned to the base are branch offices of the European Office of Aerospace Research and Development, US Army International Technology Center Atlantic, the Office of Naval Research Global, the Naval Criminal Investigative Service, the Joint NATO National Support Element, and the Fleet Industrial Supply Center. After the base underwent renovation, personnel from the U.S. Navy, U.S. Army, and U.S. Air Force relocated there, alongside civilian staff and contractors. The base also became home to a small number of Canadian Forces personnel.

RAF Blenheim Crescent has no RAF personnel present, and is commanded by an officer of the U.S. Air Force at the rank of colonel.
