= London boroughs =

Administrative subdivisions of Greater London

London borough
- The thirty-two London boroughs in England
- Category: Local authority districts
- Location: Greater London
- Created by: London Government Act 1963
- Created: 1 April 1965
- Number: 32
- Possible types: Inner London (12); Outer London (20)
- Possible status: City (1); Royal borough (3)
- Populations: 150,000–400,000
- Areas: 12–150 km^{2}
- Government: London borough council

The London boroughs are 32 of the districts that make up the administrative area of Greater London, England. The current London boroughs were all created on 1 April 1965, at the same time as Greater London, by merging groups of former local government units. Twelve were designated as Inner London boroughs and twenty as Outer London boroughs. The London boroughs have populations of between 150,000 and 400,000. Inner London boroughs tend to be smaller, in both population and area, and more densely populated than Outer London boroughs. Minor adjustments have been made to borough boundaries and two have changed their names. The City of London, at the historic core of London, is the 33rd area for local government and is not a London borough.

The London borough councils are 32 of the local authorities in London. Each council is a municipal corporation and they are a form of unitary authority. They provide the majority of local government services, such as schools, waste management, social services and libraries. The councils were first elected in 1964, and acted as shadow authorities until 1 April 1965. Each borough is divided into electoral wards, subject to periodic review, for the purpose of electing councillors. Council elections take place every four years, with the most recent elections in 2026. Traditionally, the political make-up of London borough councils was dominated by the major parties, but following the 2026 election nine were under no overall control, with smaller parties controlling eight councils. Five councils are led by directly elected mayors. The City of London has its own sui generis local government.

== List ==
Interactive map of London boroughs (and the City of London)

1. City of London (Note: The City of London is not a London borough.)
2. Westminster
3. Kensington and Chelsea
4. Hammersmith and Fulham
5. Wandsworth
6. Lambeth
7. Southwark
8. Tower Hamlets
9. Hackney
10. Islington
11. Camden
12. Brent
13. Ealing
14. Hounslow
15. Richmond upon Thames
16. Kingston upon Thames
17. Merton
18. Sutton
19. Croydon
20. Bromley
21. Lewisham
22. Greenwich
23. Bexley
24. Havering
25. Barking and Dagenham
26. Redbridge
27. Newham
28. Waltham Forest
29. Haringey
30. Enfield
31. Barnet
32. Harrow
33. Hillingdon

There are four boroughs that do not have "London borough" in their official names: the city of Westminster, and the royal boroughs of Kingston upon Thames, Kensington and Chelsea, and Greenwich.

== History ==
=== Background ===
From the mid-1930s, the Greater London area comprised four types of local government authorities. There were county boroughs, municipal boroughs, urban districts and metropolitan boroughs. The large county boroughs provided all local government services and held the powers usually invested in county councils. The municipal borough and urban district authorities had fewer powers. The situation was made more complex because county councils could delegate functions such as elementary education and library provision to the municipal borough and district councils, and this was implemented piecemeal. Reform of London local government sought to regularise this arrangement.

=== Creation ===
The Royal Commission on Local Government in Greater London was established in 1957 and the report was published on 19 October 1960. It proposed 52 "Greater London Boroughs" with a population range of 100,000 to 250,000. This was made up of a mixture of whole existing units, mergers of two or three areas, and two boroughs formed as the result of a split. In December 1961 the government proposed that there would be 34 boroughs rather than 52, and detailed their boundaries. The proposed number was further reduced to 32 in 1962.

On 1 April 1965, the 32 London boroughs and Greater London were created by the London Government Act 1963. Twelve boroughs in the former County of London area were designated Inner London boroughs and the 20 others were designated Outer London boroughs. Outer London borough councils were local education authorities, but Inner London borough councils were not, with those powers held by the Inner London Education Authority (ILEA). The City of London continued to be administered by the City of London Corporation, and the Inner and Middle Temples continued to govern their own areas. (Note: Local government legislation makes special provision for the City of London Corporation, Inner Temple and Middle Temple to perform the functions of London borough councils in their areas.)

The first elections were held on 7 May 1964, with the new councils acting as shadow authorities before coming into their powers the following year. The new London boroughs were incorporated using the provisions of the Municipal Corporations Act 1882.

=== Former authorities ===
The 32 London boroughs were created as follows. (Note: Some relatively minor changes have been made to the boundaries of boroughs since 1965, and two have changed their names.)

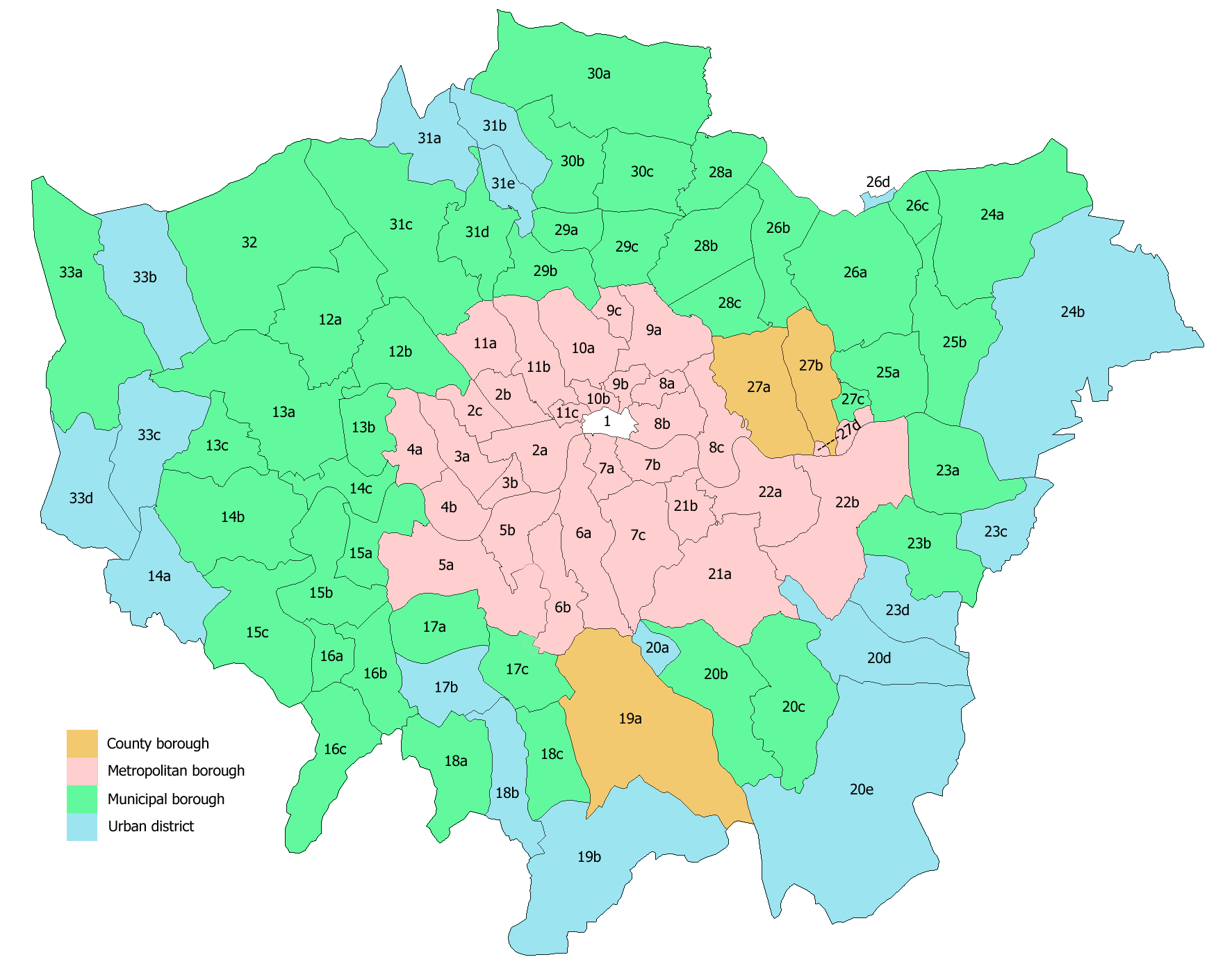
Former local government types in the Greater London area: County boroughs; Metropolitan boroughs; Municipal boroughs; Urban districts

London borough	Designation	Former areas				
Camden	Inner	Hampstead (11a)	St Pancras (11b)	Holborn (11c)		
Greenwich	Inner	Greenwich (22a)	Woolwich (part) (22b)			
Hackney	Inner	Hackney (9a)	Shoreditch (9b)	Stoke Newington (9c)		
Hammersmith (Note: Renamed Hammersmith and Fulham on 1 April 1979)	Inner	Hammersmith (4a)	Fulham (4b)			
Islington	Inner	Islington (10a)	Finsbury (10b)			
Kensington and Chelsea	Inner	Kensington (3a)	Chelsea (3b)			
Lambeth	Inner	Lambeth (6a)	Wandsworth (part) (6b)			
Lewisham	Inner	Lewisham (21a)	Deptford (21b)			
Southwark	Inner	Bermondsey (7b)	Camberwell (7c)	Southwark (7a)		
Tower Hamlets	Inner	Bethnal Green (8a)	Poplar (8c)	Stepney (8b)		
Wandsworth	Inner	Battersea (5b)	Wandsworth (part) (5a)			
Westminster	Inner	Paddington (2c)	St Marylebone (2b)	Westminster (2a)		
Barking (Note: Renamed Barking and Dagenham on 1 January 1980)	Outer	Barking (part) (25a)	Dagenham (part) (25b)			
Barnet	Outer	Barnet (31a)	East Barnet (31b)	Finchley (31d)	Hendon (31c)	Friern Barnet (31e)
Bexley	Outer	Bexley (23b)	Erith (23a)	Crayford (23c)	Chislehurst and Sidcup (part) (23d)	
Brent	Outer	Wembley (12a)	Willesden (12b)			
Bromley	Outer	Bromley (20c)	Beckenham (20b)	Orpington (20e)	Penge (20a)	Chislehurst and Sidcup (part) (20d)
Croydon	Outer	Croydon (19a)	Coulsdon and Purley (19b)			
Ealing	Outer	Acton (13b)	Ealing (13a)	Southall (13c)		
Enfield	Outer	Edmonton (30c)	Enfield (30a)	Southgate (30b)		
Haringey	Outer	Hornsey (29b)	Tottenham (29c)	Wood Green (29a)		
Harrow	Outer	Harrow (32)				
Havering	Outer	Romford (24a)	Hornchurch (24b)			
Hillingdon	Outer	Hayes and Harlington (33c)	Ruislip Northwood (33b)	Uxbridge (33a)	Yiewsley and West Drayton (33d)	
Hounslow	Outer	Brentford and Chiswick (14c)	Feltham (14a)	Heston and Isleworth (14b)		
Kingston upon Thames	Outer	Kingston upon Thames (16a)	Malden and Coombe (16b)	Surbiton (16c)		
Merton	Outer	Mitcham (17c)	Merton and Morden (17b)	Wimbledon (17a)		
Newham	Outer	West Ham (27a)	East Ham (27b)	Barking (part) (27c)	Woolwich (part) (27d)	
Redbridge	Outer	Ilford (26a)	Wanstead and Woodford (26b)	Dagenham (part) (26c)	Chigwell (part) (26d)	
Richmond upon Thames	Outer	Barnes (15a)	Richmond (15b)	Twickenham (15c)		
Sutton	Outer	Beddington (18c)	Carshalton (18b)	Sutton and Cheam (18a)		
Waltham Forest	Outer	Chingford (28a)	Leyton (28c)	Walthamstow (28b)		

=== Boundary changes ===
The London boroughs were created by combining whole existing units of local government and it was realised that this might provide arbitrary boundaries in some places. The London Government Act 1963 provided a mechanism for communities on the edge of Greater London to petition for transfer from London boroughs to a neighbouring county district. This was used in 1969 in the transfers of Knockholt in Bromley to Kent, and of Farleigh and Hooley in Croydon to Surrey. The act also provided for transfers between London boroughs and neighbouring counties where there was consensus for the change between all the relevant local authorities. This provision was used to exchange two islands on the River Thames between Richmond upon Thames and Surrey.

The Local Government Boundary Commission for England was established by the Local Government Act 1972 to review periodically the boundaries of Greater London and the London boroughs. The first review of boundaries commenced on 1 April 1987 and reported in 1992. Following the review a series of relatively minor adjustments were made to borough boundaries, for example uniting the whole of the Becontree estate in Barking and Dagenham. The commission noted that many of its recommendations were strongly opposed and were not implemented. The boundary of the City of London with adjacent boroughs was adjusted to remove some anomalies.

=== Londonwide authorities ===
Between 1965 and 1986 the boroughs were part of a two-tier system of government and shared power with the Greater London Council (GLC). The split of powers and functions meant that the Greater London Council was responsible for "wide area" services such as fire, ambulance, flood prevention, and refuse disposal; with the London borough councils responsible for "personal" services such as social care, libraries, cemeteries and refuse collection. Several London borough councils and the GLC were involved in the rate-capping rebellion of 1985. On 1 April 1986 the GLC was abolished and the borough councils gained responsibility for some services that had been provided by the Greater London Council, such as waste disposal. ILEA continued to exist as an ad hoc authority. In 1990 it was abolished and the Inner London borough councils also became local education authorities. In 2000 the Greater London Authority was created, comprising the Mayor of London and the London Assembly. As a strategic authority, it absorbed only limited powers, such as major highways and planning strategy, from the borough councils.

== London borough councils ==
The London boroughs are administered by London borough councils (LBCs). They are a form of unitary authority. They are the principal local authorities in London and are municipal corporations. (Note: The Municipal Corporations Act 1882 applies to London boroughs by a provision of the London Government Act 1963.) The legal entity is not the council, as elsewhere in the country, but the inhabitants incorporated by royal charter. (Note: A process abolished elsewhere in England and Wales under the Local Government Act 1972.)

=== Names ===
The official legal title of the borough councils is "The Mayor and Burgesses of the London Borough of X" (or "The Lord Mayor and Citizens of the City of Westminster"). The Local Government Act 1972 provided a mechanism for councils to change their names and that of their boroughs. This was used by the London Borough of Hammersmith (changed to Hammersmith and Fulham) on 1 April 1979 and the London Borough of Barking (changed to Barking and Dagenham) on 1 January 1980. Borough names formed by combining two locality names had been discouraged when the boroughs were created.

=== Services ===
London borough councils are responsible for running most local services, such as schools, social services, waste collection and roads. Some London-wide services are run by the Greater London Authority, and some services and lobbying of government are pooled within London Councils. Some councils group together for services such as waste collection and disposal. The boroughs are local government districts and have similar functions to metropolitan boroughs. Each borough council is a local education authority and local planning authority. (Note: The City of London Corporation, Greater London Authority and mayoral development corporations are also planning authorities.)

Service	Greater London Authority	London borough councils
Education		check
Housing	check	check
Planning applications		check
Strategic planning	check	check
Premises licensing	(Note: Since the English Devolution and Community Empowerment Act 2026)	check
Transport planning	check	check
Passenger transport	check	
Highways	check	check
Police	check	
Fire	check	
Social services		check
Libraries		check
Leisure and recreation		check
Waste collection		check
Waste disposal		check
Environmental health		check
Revenue collection		check

=== Shared services ===
Shared services are borough council services shared between two or more boroughs. Shared services were previously resisted due to councils guarding their authority. However, as the need for budget cuts in the late 2000s became apparent some councils have sought service mergers. Westminster and Hammersmith & Fulham were due to merge their education services, including school admissions and transport, by 2011. In October 2010, Hammersmith & Fulham, Kensington & Chelsea and Westminster announced plans to merge all their services to create a "super-council". Each would retain its own political identity, leadership and councillors but staff and budgets would be combined for cost savings. Lambeth and Southwark likewise expressed an interest in sharing services.

=== Elections ===
Map showing party control of each borough council after the 2026 local elections.

The first elections to the new borough councils were held on 7 May 1964. The councillors were elected for a three-year term, acting in a shadow capacity until the London boroughs were created on 1 April 1965. The terms of members due to go out in 1967 were extended by one year to prevent the elections taking place in the same year as the 1967 Greater London Council election. (Note: Borough councillor terms due to end in 1967, and alderman terms due to end in 1967 and 1970, were extended by the London Government Act 1967.) Councillors were elected for three-year terms in 1968, 1971 and 1974 with the terms due to end in 1977 extended by a year to end in 1978. (Note: Terms were extended by the London Councillors Order 1976.) Aldermanic elections were held following the council elections in 1964, with half of the alderman due to retire in 1967 (later extended to 1968) and the other half in 1970 (extended to 1971). Aldermanic elections for six-year terms were held in 1968 and 1971. Aldermen were elected in 1974 for a three-year term. The aldermen elected in 1971 and 1974 later had their terms extended, to all end in 1978. Elections of councillors have been held on a four-year cycle since 1978.

=== Executives ===
Twenty-eight councils follow the leader and cabinet model of executive governance. Five councils are led by directly elected mayors. They are the mayors of Croydon, Hackney, Lewisham, Newham and Tower Hamlets. Borough mayors are elected every four years at the same time as councillors.

=== Political control ===
Traditionally, the political make-up of London borough councils was dominated by the Conservative and Labour parties, but following the 2026 election nine were under no overall control, with the Liberal Democrats, Greens and Reform all controlling councils.

== See also ==
- Borough
- ISO 3166-2:GB, subdivision codes for the United Kingdom
- Political make-up of local councils in the United Kingdom
- List of London boroughs
