= Yiewsley and West Drayton Urban District =

Former local authority in the United Kingdom

Yiewsley and West Drayton
- Urban district
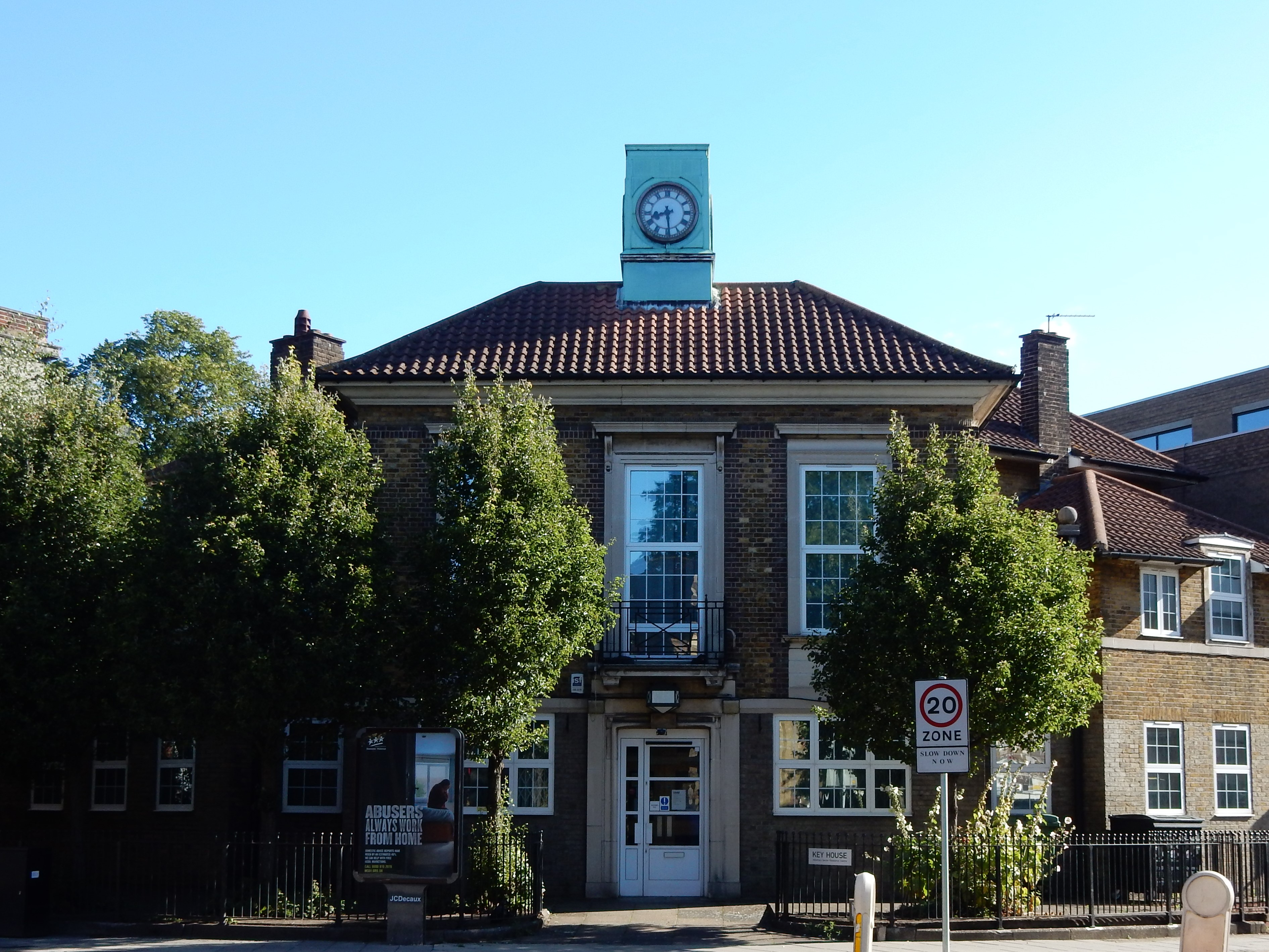
- Key House in Yiewsley was town hall of the urban district between 1930 and 1952.

- Yiewsley and West Drayton within Middlesex in 1961
- Area
  - 1911: 1,091 acres (4.4 km^{2})
  - 1961: 5,276 acres (21.4 km^{2})
  - Coordinates: 51.5117°N 0.4728°W
- Area transferred
  - 1911: Yiewsley 1,091 acres (4.4 km^{2}) from Uxbridge Rural District
  - 1929: West Drayton 878 acres (3.6 km^{2}) from Uxbridge Rural District
- 1930: Harmondsworth 3,308 acres (13.4 km^{2}) from Stained Rural District
- Population
  - 1911: 4,315
  - 1961: 23,723
- Density
  - 1911: 3.9/acre
  - 1961: 4.5/acre
- History
  - Created: 1911
  - Abolished: 1965
  - Succeeded by: London Borough of Hillingdon
- Status: Urban district
- Government: Yiewsley Urban District Council (1911–1929); Yiewsley and West Drayton Urban District Council (1929–1965)
  - HQ: Yiewsley and District Council offices (1929–1930); Town Hall, Yiewsley (1930–1952); Drayton Hall, West Drayton (1952–1965)
  - Motto: We Serve

Yiewsley and West Drayton was a local government district in Middlesex, England, from 1929 to 1965. Its area became the south-west of the London Borough of Hillingdon.

== Establishment and expansion ==
The Yiewsley and West Drayton Urban District evolved from the Yiewsley Urban District which had been established on 14 April 1911 by an order of the Middlesex County Council granting the Civil Parish of Yiewsley urban powers.

Historically Yiewsley had been a district in the Parish of Hillingdon and became part of the Parish of Hillingdon East when the Hillingdon Parish was divided under the Local Government Act 1894, also becoming part of the new Uxbridge Rural District. Yiewsley became a civil parish in 1896, remaining in the Uxbridge Rural District until becoming an urban district in 1911.

On 7 December 1928 Middlesex County Council issued an order for the Uxbridge Rural District to be amalgamated into the Uxbridge Urban District, with the exception of the Parish of Northolt and the Parish of West Drayton. The Parish of West Drayton was to be transferred to the Urban District of Yiewsley with the urban district being renamed Yiewsley and West Drayton. The urban district council was to increase in size to have 15 members, 9 representing the Yiewsley Ward and 6 representing the West Drayton Ward. The order was to come into force on 31 March 1929.

Elections for the council took place on Saturday 23 March 1929 and the first meeting of the new council members was held on Wednesday 3 April 1929.

On 31 March 1930 an order of the Middlesex County Council dissolved the Staines Rural District with the Yiewsley and West Drayton Urban District amalgamating the Parish of Harmondsworth which included the villages of Longford, Sipson and Heathrow. The composition of the urban district council was changed with the number of ward members increased to 22. Yiewsley Ward members were increased to 12, West Drayton Ward members reduced to 5 and Harmondsworth Ward members having also 5 (In line with the estimated population of each Ward: Yiewsley 6,134 – West Drayton 2,499 – Harmondsworth 2,600). Urban District elections took place on Saturday 22 March 1930 with the new Ward members attending their first meeting of the urban district council on Tuesday 1 April 1930. On Friday 23 May 1930 the urban district's new town hall in Yiewsley was officially opened by Mr. F. E. Dominey, JP, the chairman of the council.

After the Second World War the town hall became too small to meet the needs of the urban district. In 1948 an agreement was made to purchase Drayton Hall in West Drayton, with its official opening taking place on 5 April 1952. The building was extended in 1955. The town hall in Yiewsley was sold to Middlesex County Council and today as Key House, provides office and training space for charity and non-profit organisations.

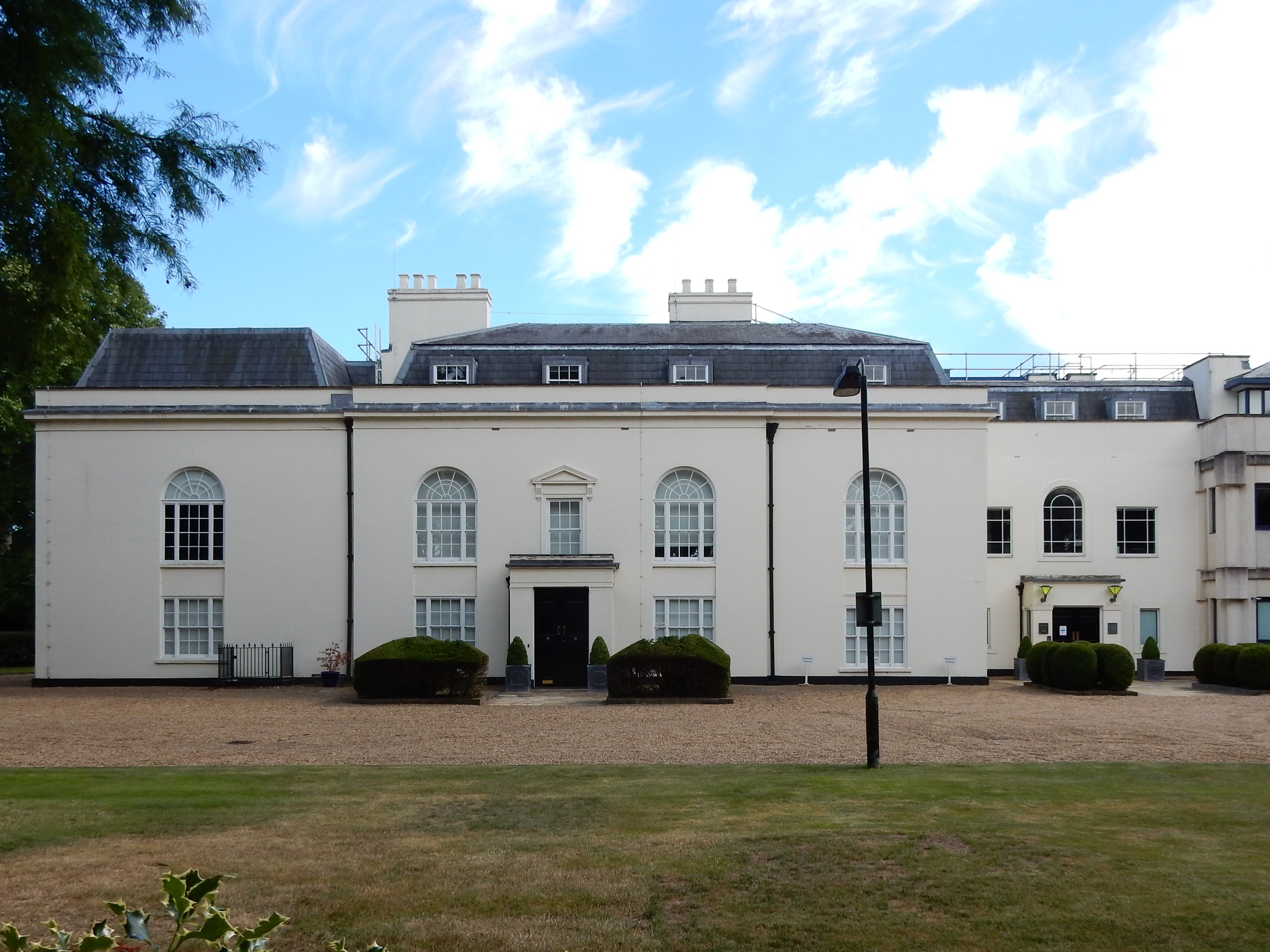
Drayton Hall, municipal offices of the Yiewsley and West Drayton Urban District between 1952 and 1965

== Abolition ==
The Yiewsley and West Drayton Urban District, with the whole County of Middlesex, formed part of the review area of the Royal Commission on Local Government in Greater London. Its report published in 1960, proposed 52 Greater London Boroughs with one being formed from the Municipal Borough of Uxbridge, the Ruislip-Northwood Urban District and the Yiewsley and West Drayton Urban District. The UK Government produced a white paper on 29 November 1961 which proposed fewer, larger boroughs. With the introduction of legislation in 1962 the number of boroughs had been reduced to 32 with the Hayes and Harlington Urban District joining the three other administrative areas in forming a new borough. The London Government Act 1963 created the London Borough of Hillingdon in the new county of Greater London on 1 April 1965.

== Civic history ==
=== Coat of arms ===
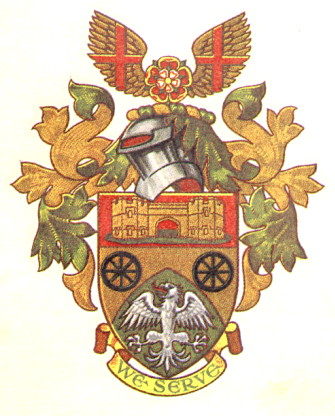
The coat of arms of the Yiewsley and West Drayton Urban District

The coat of arms of Yiewsley and West Drayton, which included Heathrow Airport, was granted in 1953 shortly before the coronation of Queen Elizabeth II. It was:

Per chevron enarched or and vert in chief two cartwheels sable and in base an eagle displayed argent a chief gules thereon on a mount vert a representation of the Gatehouse at West Drayton proper. Crest: On a wreath of the colours between two eagle's wings or charged with a cross gules a Tudor rose proper. Motto: 'We Serve'.

The coat of arms of the London Borough of Hillingdon replicated in its logo re-uses splayed eagle wings, the Tudor rose and the main feature of its crest above is a red demi-lion with silver/white wings whose undersides (one visible as the lion is side-on) have the red cross of St George.

== Demography ==
The population of the urban district was as follows:

Year	1911	1921	1931	1939	1941	1951	1961
Population	4,315 (Note: Yiewsley Urban District.)	4,843 (Note: Yiewsley Urban District.)	13,066	16,132	(Note: The census was suspended for World War II.)	20,468	23,723
