= List of London boroughs =

List of boroughs in Greater London

Map of the 32 London boroughs and the City of London

This is a list of local authority districts within Greater London, including 32 London boroughs and the City of London. The London boroughs were all created on 1 April 1965. Upon creation, twelve were designated Inner London boroughs and the remaining twenty were designated Outer London boroughs. The Office for National Statistics has amended the designations of three boroughs for statistics purposes only. Three boroughs have been granted the designation royal borough and one has city status. For planning purposes, in addition to the boroughs and City there are also three active development corporations, the London Legacy Development Corporation, Old Oak and Park Royal Development Corporation and Oxford Street Development Corporation.

== List of boroughs and local authorities ==
Borough	Designation	Status	Local authority	Political control	Headquarters	Area		Population (2022 est)	Location	Map ref.
Borough	Designation	Status	Local authority	Political control	Headquarters	sq mi	km2	Population (2022 est)	Location	Map ref.
Barking and Dagenham (Note: Renamed from London Borough of Barking 1 January 1980. "No. 48021". The London Gazette. 4 December 1979. p. 15280.)	Outer		Barking and Dagenham London Borough Council	Labour	Town Hall, 1 Town Square	13.93	36.1	219,992	51.5607°N 0.1557°E	25
Barnet	Outer		Barnet London Borough Council	Labour	2 Bristol Avenue, Colindale	33.49	86.7	389,101	51.6252°N 0.1517°W	31
Bexley	Outer		Bexley London Borough Council	Conservative	Civic Offices, 2 Watling Street	23.38	60.6	247,835	51.4549°N 0.1505°E	23
Brent	Outer		Brent London Borough Council	No overall control	Brent Civic Centre, Engineers Way	16.70	43.3	341,221	51.5588°N 0.2817°W	12
Bromley	Outer		Bromley London Borough Council	Conservative	Civic Centre, Churchill Court	57.97	150.1	329,578	51.3992°N 0.0165°E	20
Camden	Inner		Camden London Borough Council	Labour	5 Pancras Square	8.40	21.8	218,049	51.5290°N 0.1255°W	11
Croydon	Outer		Croydon London Borough Council	No overall control	Bernard Weatherill House, Mint Walk	33.41	86.5	392,224	51.3714°N 0.0977°W	19
Ealing	Outer		Ealing London Borough Council	Labour	Perceval House, 14-16 Uxbridge Road	21.44	55.5	369,937	51.5130°N 0.3089°W	13
Enfield	Outer		Enfield London Borough Council	No overall control	Civic Centre, Silver Street	31.74	82.2	327,224	51.6538°N 0.0799°W	30
Greenwich (Note: Royal borough from 2012)	Inner (Note: Haringey and Newham are Inner London for statistics; Greenwich is Outer London for statistics)	Royal	Greenwich London Borough Council	Labour	Woolwich Town Hall, Wellington Street	18.28	47.3	291,080	51.4892°N 0.0648°E	22
Hackney	Inner		Hackney London Borough Council	Green	Hackney Town Hall, Mare Street	7.36	19.1	261,491	51.5450°N 0.0553°W	9
Hammersmith and Fulham (Note: Renamed from London Borough of Hammersmith 1 April 1979. "No. 47771". The London Gazette. 13 February 1979. p. 2095.)	Inner		Hammersmith and Fulham London Borough Council	Labour	Town Hall, King Street	6.33	16.4	185,238	51.4927°N 0.2339°W	4
Haringey	Outer		Haringey London Borough Council	No overall control	Civic Centre, High Road	11.42	29.6	261,811	51.6000°N 0.1119°W	29
Harrow	Outer		Harrow London Borough Council	Conservative	Civic Centre, Station Road	19.49	50.5	261,185	51.5898°N 0.3346°W	32
Havering	Outer		Havering London Borough Council	Reform UK	Town Hall, Main Road	43.35	112.3	264,703	51.5812°N 0.1837°E	24
Hillingdon	Outer		Hillingdon London Borough Council	Conservative	Civic Centre, High Street	44.67	115.7	310,681	51.5441°N 0.4760°W	33
Hounslow	Outer		Hounslow London Borough Council	Labour	Hounslow House, 7 Bath Road	21.61	56.0	290,488	51.4746°N 0.3680°W	14
Islington	Inner		Islington London Borough Council	Labour	Customer Centre, 222 Upper Street	5.74	14.9	220,373	51.5416°N 0.1022°W	10
Kensington and Chelsea	Inner	Royal	Kensington and Chelsea London Borough Council	Conservative	The Town Hall, Hornton Street	4.68	12.1	146,154	51.5020°N 0.1947°W	3
Kingston upon Thames	Outer	Royal	Kingston upon Thames London Borough Council	Liberal Democrat	Guildhall, High Street	14.38	37.2	168,302	51.4085°N 0.3064°W	16
Lambeth	Inner		Lambeth London Borough Council	No overall control	Lambeth Town Hall, Brixton Hill	10.36	26.8	316,812	51.4607°N 0.1163°W	6
Lewisham	Inner		Lewisham London Borough Council	Green	Town Hall, 1 Catford Road	13.57	35.1	298,653	51.4452°N 0.0209°W	21
Merton	Outer		Merton London Borough Council	Labour	Civic Centre, London Road	14.52	37.6	210,709	51.4014°N 0.1958°W	17
Newham	Outer		Newham London Borough Council	No overall control	Newham Dockside, 1000 Dockside Road	13.98	36.2	358,645	51.5077°N 0.0469°E	27
Redbridge	Outer		Redbridge London Borough Council	Labour	Town Hall, 128-142 High Road	21.78	56.4	310,911	51.5590°N 0.0741°E	26
Richmond upon Thames	Outer		Richmond upon Thames London Borough Council	Liberal Democrat	Civic Centre, 44 York Street	22.17	57.4	194,894	51.4479°N 0.3260°W	15
Southwark	Inner		Southwark London Borough Council	No overall control	160 Tooley Street	11.14	28.9	311,913	51.5035°N 0.0804°W	7
Sutton	Outer		Sutton London Borough Council	Liberal Democrat	Civic Offices, St Nicholas Way	16.93	43.8	209,602	51.3618°N 0.1945°W	18
Tower Hamlets	Inner		Tower Hamlets London Borough Council	Aspire	Town Hall, Whitechapel Road	7.63	19.8	325,789	51.5099°N 0.0059°W	8
Waltham Forest	Outer		Waltham Forest London Borough Council	Green	Waltham Forest Town Hall, Forest Road	14.99	38.8	275,887	51.5908°N 0.0134°W	28
Wandsworth	Inner		Wandsworth London Borough Council	No overall control	The Town Hall, Wandsworth High Street	13.23	34.3	329,035	51.4567°N 0.1910°W	5
Westminster	Inner	City	Westminster City Council	Conservative	Westminster City Hall, 64 Victoria Street	8.29	21.5	211,365	51.4973°N 0.1372°W	2

== City of London ==
The City of London is the 33rd principal division of Greater London but it is not a London borough.

Borough	Designation	Status	Local authority	Political control	Headquarters	Area		Population (2022 est)	Location	Map ref.
Borough	Designation	Status	Local authority	Political control	Headquarters	sq mi	km2	Population (2022 est)	Location	Map ref.
City of London	(Inner) (Note: The City of London is not a London borough but is treated in legislation as if it were an Inner London borough)	Sui generis; City; Ceremonial county	Corporation of London; Inner Temple; Middle Temple	Non-partisan	Guildhall	1.12	2.9	10,847	51.5155°N 0.0922°W	1

== See also ==
- Political make-up of London borough councils
- List of areas of London
- Subdivisions of England
