= Uxbridge Rural District =

Former local government area in the UK

Coordinates: 51.57°N 0.47°W

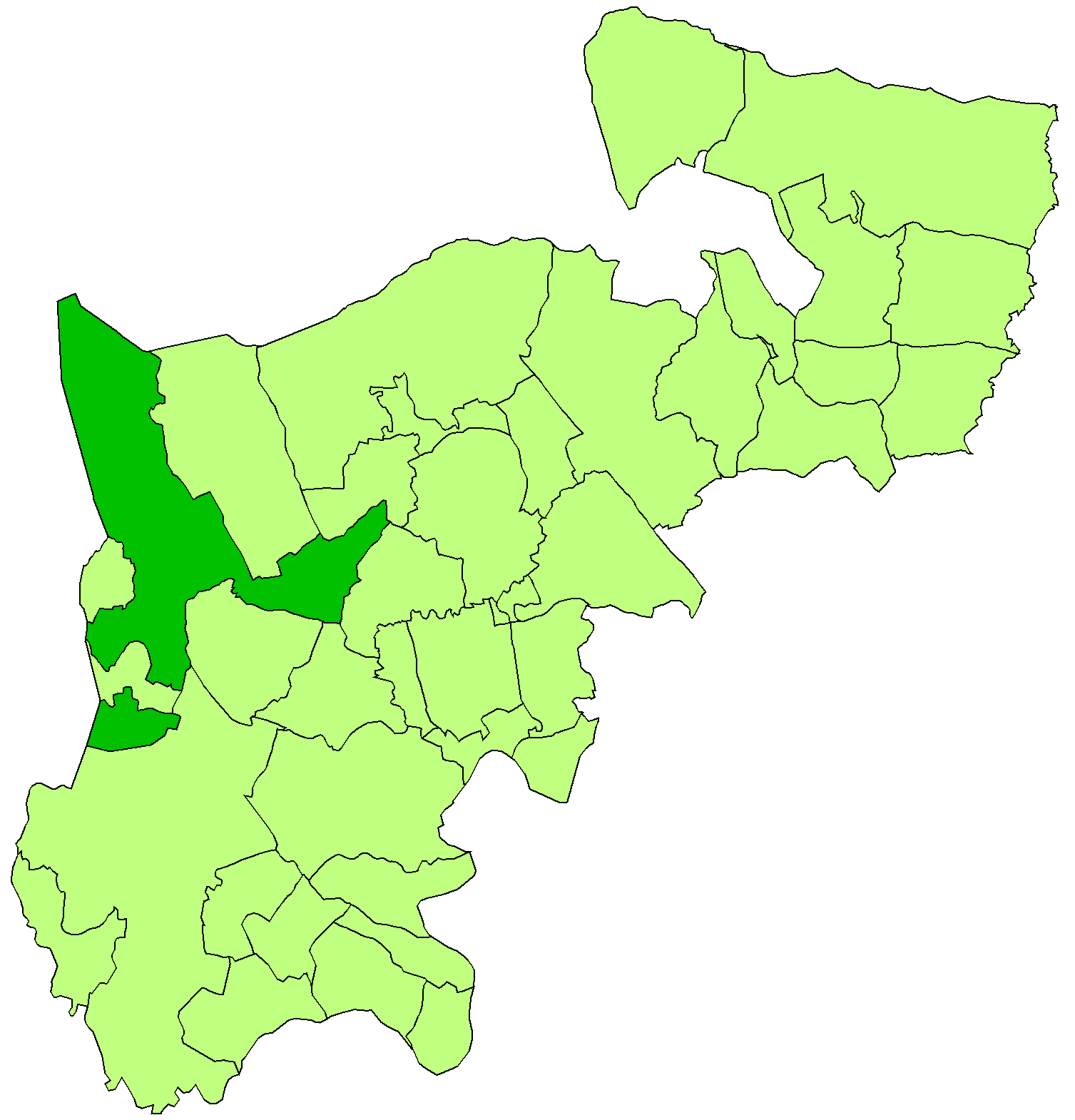
- Uxbridge Rural District within the former administrative Middlesex (so excluding the county's south-eastern large contribution to the young County of London) as at 1911. It can be seen from the dark green subject zone that beyond to the north-east and to the south-east its former parishes: Ruislip (including Northwood its sub-breakaway); and Hayes broke away in 1904 and the new districts flanking the remaining eastern projection. The district excluded, since 1911, the thin band of Yiewsley Urban District towards the south. The small Uxbridge Urban District was from the outset separate likewise against the county boundary – west.
- History
  - Created: 1875 (as a sanitary district)
  - Abolished: 1929
  - Succeeded by: Uxbridge Urban District
- Status: Rural district
  - HQ: Uxbridge

Uxbridge Rural District was, from 1894 to 1929, a local government district in Middlesex, England.

== Prior sanitary and poor law bodies ==
This entity amounted to a widening of the functions and powers of Uxbridge rural sanitary district formed in 1875. Alongside that district and the town's urban one, since the 1834 remodelling of the poor law and until 1894, the Uxbridge Poor Law Union existed.

The district, and union, excluded the three small southern and three small eastern parishes of Elthorne Hundred – an early medieval unit of varied but always relatively little importance after the English reformation.

A little of Hillingdon, the parish bounding Uxbridge on three of its four sides, moved from the sanitary district to the urban district in 1883.

The parish of Northwood was removed in 1891, forming an urban sanitary district.

As across England, the more local, overlapping, civil parish councils began at a similar time as the sanitary districts, ending the vestries system which in many matters empowered the local Church of England laity.

== Incorporation by statute ==
Under the Local Government Act 1894 the rural sanitary and poor law bodies mentioned became a rural district, thus a led by a council directly elected by a wide electorate of local residents.

Hillingdon civil parish was, like most, formed during the 1870s and when districts began it was not dissolved but rather remained as a weakened body. It was weakened like the others and split in two to work alongside the 1894 changes: Hillingdon West also by this time commonly seen as part of Uxbridge reflecting its housing and church-building expansion joined the compact Uxbridge urban district; Hillingdon East fell into the rural district.

As of 1894, the district comprised parishes:

- Cowley scattered in the south-centre
- Harefield in the north
- Hayes in the east
- Hillingdon East including Cowley and initially Yiewsley
- Ickenham, towards the north
- Northolt in the east north-east
- Ruislip in the north-east
- West Drayton in the south

Note: A daughter civil parish, Yiewsley, named after a similarly sized historic manor was created in 1896, the former southern band of Hillingdon.

Hayes became an urban district in 1904, as did Ruislip (re-merged of sorts with its daughter parish under the name Ruislip-Northwood). A Yiewsley Urban District was created in 1911, creating the only interruption in geographical continuity in the district. Northolt, an eastern 'winged' triangle of mainly Interwar housing was split in 1928 between the Municipal Borough of Ealing and Harrow on the Hill Urban District.

The district was abolished in 1929. It became part of the Uxbridge Urban District, apart from the outlying, compact southern parish of West Drayton which became part of the clear-components Yiewsley and West Drayton Urban District.

== Modern resonances ==
=== Local government ===
The sanitary district plus Uxbridge (thus the Poor Law Union) plus three of the six other parishes of long-obsolete Elthorne Hundred, are bar one parish, identical to the London Borough of Hillingdon. The exception is Northolt – split between the London Boroughs of Ealing and Brent. The largely sidestepped civil parish councils were abolished, locally, in the mid 20th century and only very few have been formed afresh across Greater London.

=== Postcodes ===
Apart from what was for centuries all Ruislip, including Northwood and Eastcote in the HA postcode area, but with eastern additions as far as the old Elthorne Hundred, the poor law union emulates the UB postcode area.
