= Hayes Cottage Hospital =

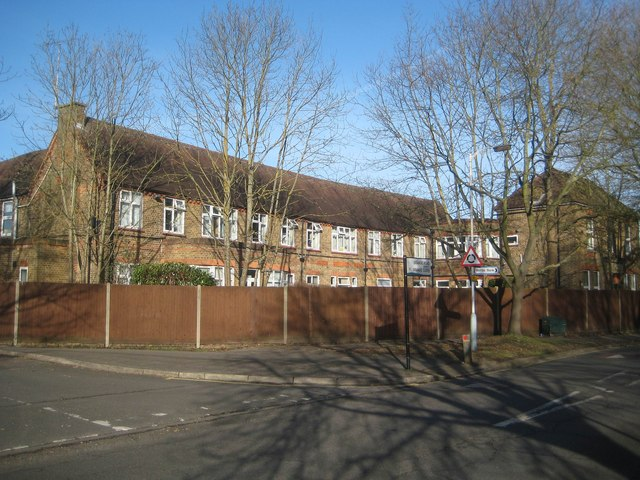
- Hayes Cottage Hospital

- Location within Hillingdon

Geography
- Location: Hayes, London, England, United Kingdom
- Coordinates: 51.5216°N 0.4236°W

History
- Founded: 1898
- Closed: 1990

Links
- Lists: Hospitals in England

Hayes Cottage Hospital was a healthcare facility in Hayes, West London.

== History ==
The hospital opened in 1898 in Grange Road, Hayes to provide medical care for the local populations of Hayes, Harlington and Hillingdon. The 2-storey red brick building had five beds.

In 1948 the Hospital, which then had 22 beds joined the NHS, but its operating theatre was closed and its X-ray equipment was removed and it became a GP hospital for medical cases only, under the control of the Uxbridge Group Hospital Medical Committee. In 1974 it came under the control of the Hillingdon District Health Authority.

At the end of 1983 it was the site of a workers occupation aiming to keep the hospital open. There was another, but unsuccessful occupation in 1990, after which the hospital was closed and the building turned into a private nursing home. In 2007 a renal dialysis unit was built in the grounds.
