= Coat of arms of the London Borough of Hillingdon =

Hillingdon's coat of arms

The coat of arms of the London Borough of Hillingdon is the official symbol of the London Borough of Hillingdon. They use elements from the coats of arms of the four previous districts. It is described as:

Arms: Per pale Gules and Vert an Eagle displayed per pale Or and Argent in the dexter claw a Fleur-de-lis Or and in the sinister claw a Cog-Wheel Argent on a Chief Or four Civic Crowns Vert.

Crest: On a Wreath of the Colours issuant from a Circlet of Brushwood Sable a demi-Lion Gules with wings Argent the underside of each wing charged with a Cross Gules and holding between the paws a Bezant thereon a Mullet Azure.

Supporters: On the dexter side an Heraldic Tiger Or gorged with an Astral Crown Azure and charged on the shoulder with a Rose Gules charged with another Argent barbed and seeded proper and on the sinister side a Stag proper attired and gorged with a Circlet of Brushwood and charged on the shoulder with two Ears of Rye slipped in saltire Or.

Motto: Forward.

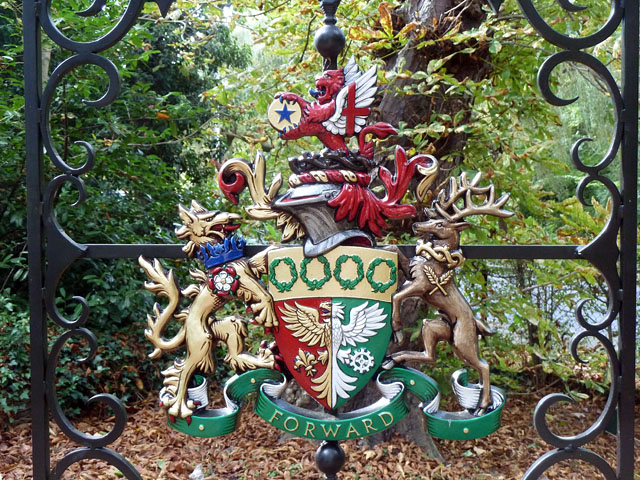
The coat of arms in relief on a gateway in Eastcote.

The four green civic crowns or wreaths on the shield proclaim the equal status of the four predecessor units (a borough and three urban districts). The motto 'Forward' was chosen from Hayes and Harlington's coat of arms.

The eagle at the centre of the shield was taken from the old arms of Uxbridge Borough Council and Yiewsley and West Drayton Urban District Council. It was adapted by them from the arms of the Paget family, from the reign of Henry VIII's son Edward lords of the manor of West Drayton and later those of Dawley (in Harlington a place also known as Arlington) and of Harmondsworth and Earls of Uxbridge. The medieval-imaginary tiger supporting the shield on the left is also taken from the Paget family arms. The fleur de lys (or lily) on the left of the shield is from the arms of Ruislip-Northwood, and commemorates the fact that the manor of Ruislip was held for much of its history by the Abbey of Bec and then King's College, Cambridge, for both of whom the lily was a symbol of religious purity.

The circlet or enclosure of brushwood from which the lion is rising on the crest is from the arms of Hayes and Harlington, and may refer back to its ancient heritage as forested hunting land. The same can be said of the stag with a circlet of brushwood supporting the shield on the right. The lion itself represents Great Britain. Its wings, with the Saint George's Cross, are from the arms of Yiewsley and West Drayton and symbolise the arrival of Queen Elizabeth II at Heathrow airport in 1953. The blue 'astral' crown on the tiger supporting the shield is in the colours of the Royal Air Force, and celebrates its long history within the Borough. The Tudor rose on the same tiger is from the arms of Yiewsley and West Drayton and is a historic English royal badge.

The eagle on the shield denotes the area's connections with the RAF and Heathrow/London Airport. The North Star, as shown on the crest, was traditionally used in navigation, so here again represents the Borough's airports. In the original arms of Ruislip-Northwood the colours were reversed. The cog wheel on the right of the shield is from the arms of Hayes and Harlington and reflects the industry of Hayes. The two ears of rye 'slipped' (with their stalks cut short) on the stag supporting the shield on the right, are a pun on the name Ruislip, and were taken from the arms of Ruislip-Northwood.

== See also ==
- Armorial of London
