= Hillingdon Civic Centre =

Municipal building in London, England

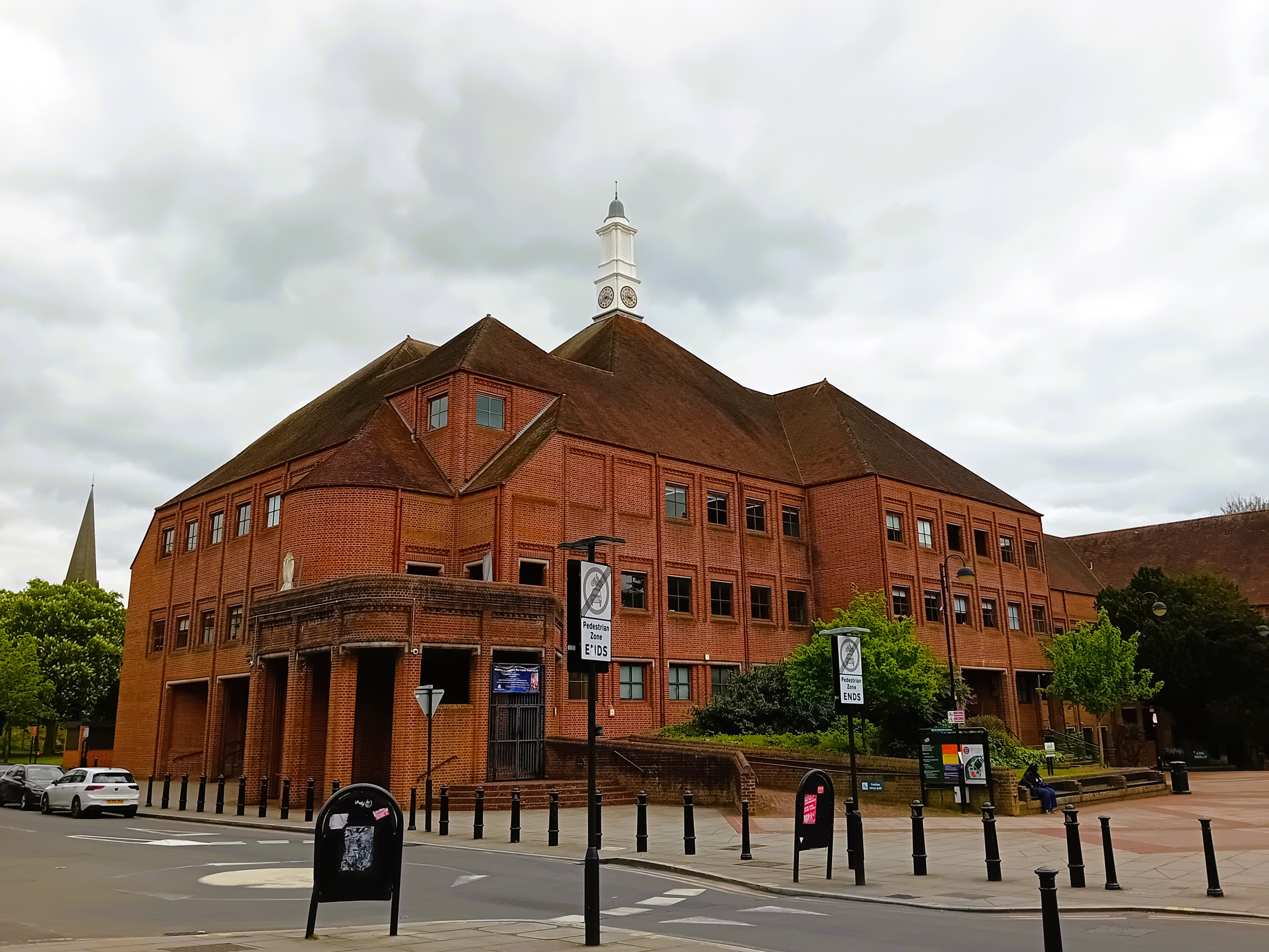
- Front part of the building with clock tower as seen from High Street

- Shown in Hillingdon
- 51.5439°N 0.4761°W
- Location: Uxbridge

History
- Built: 1979

Site notes
- Architect: Andrew Derbyshire
- Architectural style: Neo-vernacular style

Listed Building – Grade II
- Designated: 18 April 2018
- Reference no.: 1451218

Hillingdon Civic Centre is a municipal building in the High Street, Uxbridge. The civic centre, which is the headquarters of Hillingdon London Borough Council, is a Grade II listed building.

== History ==
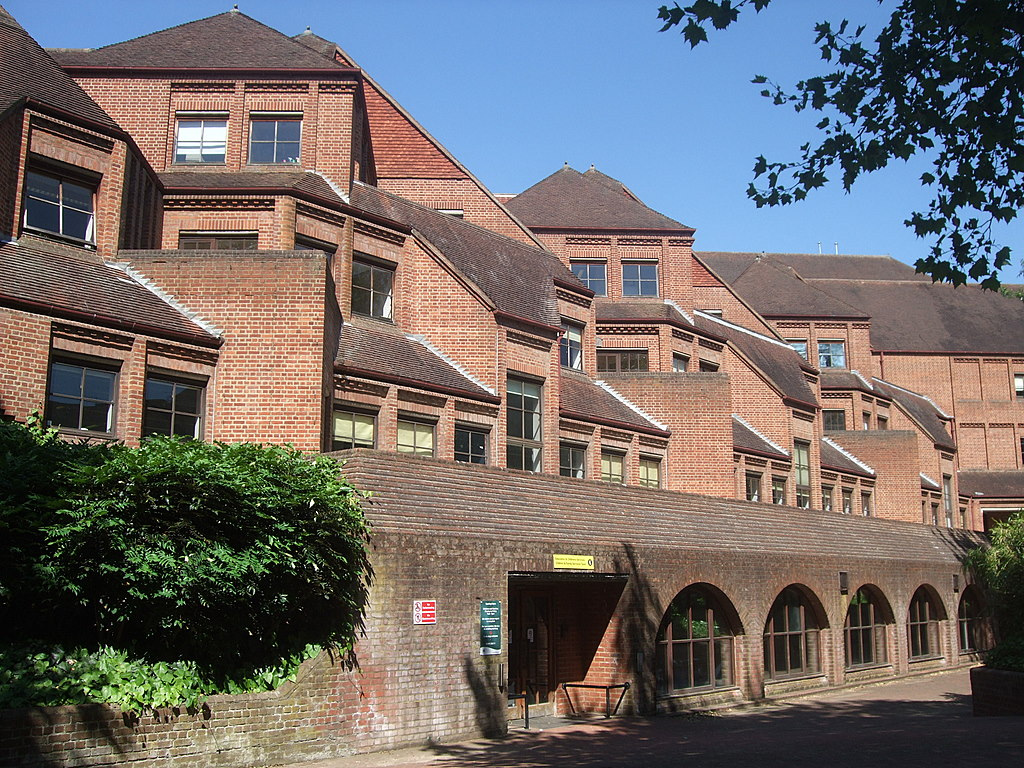
Another view of the building

The old Uxbridge Urban District Council had acquired a house called Southfields at 265 High Street in 1927 and converted it to be its offices and meeting place, having previously met in a council chamber on the upper floors of Uxbridge Market House. Middlesex County Council built itself an office building adjoining 265 High Street in 1939 which also included a library and clinic, with plans to later extend the building onto the site of Southfields to include a town hall and municipal offices for Uxbridge Urban District Council too.

With the outbreak of the Second World War the plans for further buildings on the site were not pursued. Uxbridge became a municipal borough in 1955, and the borough council continued to be based at 265 High Street until it was replaced in 1965 by the London Borough of Hillingdon. Following the creation of the London borough in 1965, civic leaders decided to procure a purpose-built civic centre. They resurrected plans to build on the site of Southfields, also incorporating the 1939 Middlesex County Council building.

The new building, which was designed by Andrew Derbyshire, was acclaimed as one of the most famous buildings in the British neo-vernacular style. It was planned from 1970 and the construction work, which was undertaken by Higgs and Hill at a cost of £5.6 million, started in January 1973. It opened in stages from 1976 with a formal opening by the chairman of the British Airports Authority, Norman Payne, on 28 April 1979.

Derbyshire's design envisaged a diamond-shaped building to the west containing the offices of the council officers and their departments and a more irregular-shaped building to the east containing the public areas including the council chamber, the civic suite and register office. The main frontage to the public areas, facing onto the High Street, featured a loggia with eight entrances and a steep roof, with a two-storey block with a clock tower behind. The design made extensive use of brick and tile, to pay homage to traditional homely brick architecture of nearby buildings and suburban developments that were "indigenous to the borough". It was designated a Grade II Listed Building in April 2018.

Despite its listed status, the building has had a mixed reception from architectural critics. In his 2012 essay Post Modernism to Ghost Modernism Jonathan Meades argued the building was symbolic of the political climate of its era and highlighted it as an early example of a more populist, conservative style of architecture which aspired to be inoffensive but instead came across as patronising. He concluded that “the proudly vaunting philistinism which has afflicted Britain for three decades found its first architectural expression at Hillingdon.”

A distinctive yew wood sculpture, designed by John Phillips, made up of fourteen pieces of wood suspended on a wire rope, was hung in the stairwell leading up to council chamber.

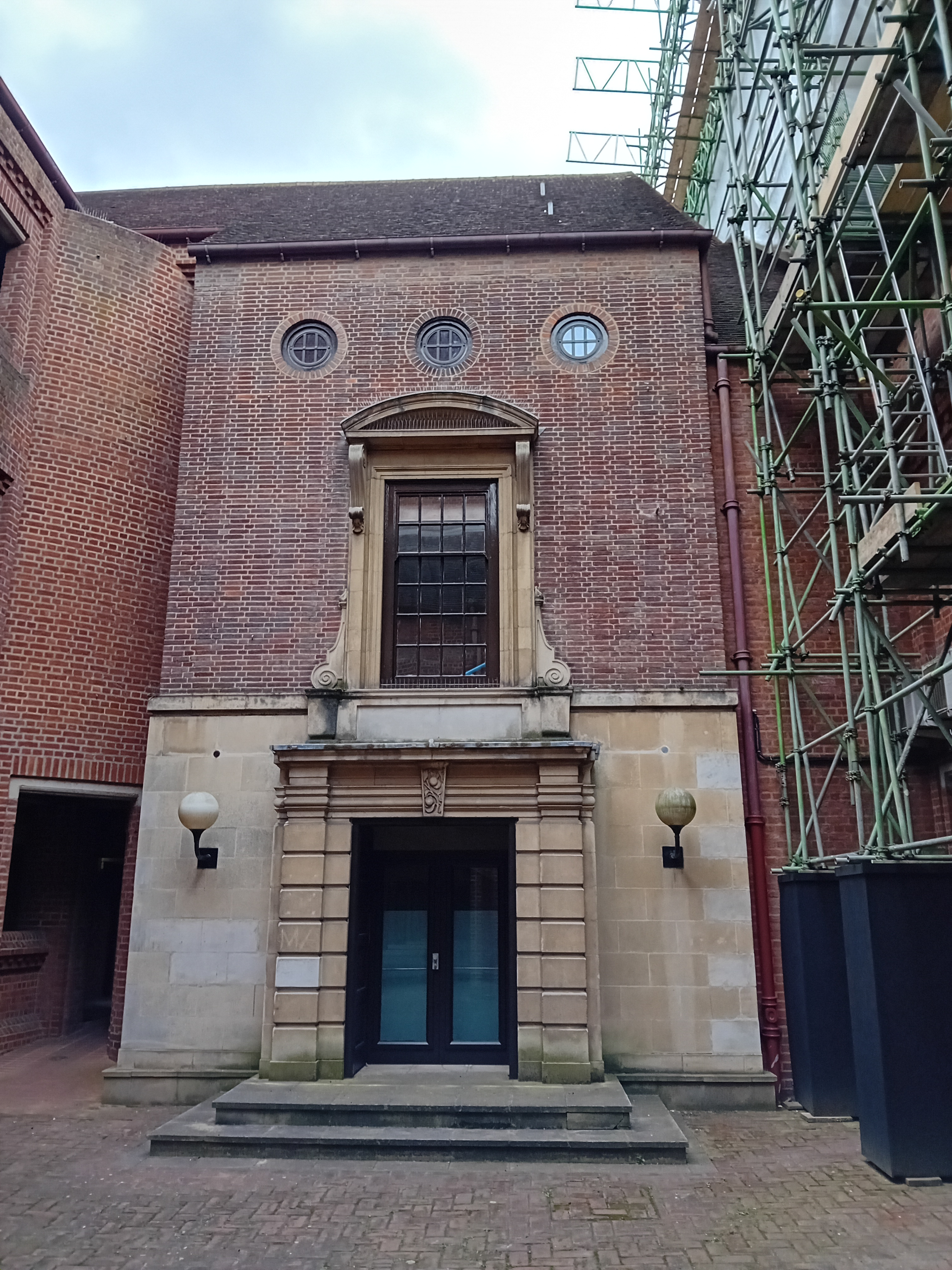
One of the surviving parts of the 1939 Middlesex County Council building, now visible only from an internal courtyard within the 1970s building.
