= Hayes and Harlington Urban District =

Administrative area in Middlesex, England

Coordinates: 51.50200°N 0.42010°W

Hayes and Harlington (Hayes until 1930)
- Hayes and Harlington within Middlesex in 1961
- Area
  - 1911: 3,311 acres (13.4 km^{2})
  - 1961: 5,158 acres (20.9 km^{2})
- Population
  - 1901: 2,594
  - 1961: 67,915
- History
  - Created: 1904
  - Abolished: 1965
  - Succeeded by: London Borough of Hillingdon
- Status: Urban district
- Government
  - HQ: Barra Hall
  - Motto: Forward

Hayes and Harlington (until 1930, Hayes) was a local government, urban district in west Middlesex, England, from 1904 to 1965.

It was created in 1904 as Hayes Urban District, covering the Hayes parish transferred from Uxbridge Rural District (including Yeading). In 1930 the district acquired the parishes Cranford and larger Harlington from the disbanded Staines Rural District at that time adding the "and Harlington" suffix.

Its main boundary change occurred in 1934 coinciding with the abolition of internal Cranford civil parish, its east going to Heston and Isleworth M.B. (361 acres (1.46 km^{2})); the west remaining and added to Harlington parish (368 acres (1.49 km^{2})).

In 1965, under the London Government Act 1963, Hayes and Harlington Urban District was abolished, the area becoming part of the London Borough of Hillingdon in Greater London. The district's name survives, however, in both the Hayes and Harlington Parliamentary constituency and Hayes and Harlington railway station.

== Coat of arms ==
The coat of arms of Hayes and Harlington was granted in 1950. It was: vert a pall couped at the base argent between in chief two wings conjoined in base of the last and in fess as many cog-wheels proper in front of two rays of lightning in saltire or. Crest: on a wreath of the colours issuant from a circlet of brushwood a demi-stag supporting a seax point upwards proper pommel and hilt or enfiled with a Saxon crown Gold.

The green field stood for the district's agricultural background and the amenities of the Green Belt. The silver pall was derived from that in the arms of the See of Canterbury. In 790 King Offa granted lands in Hayes to the Archbishop of Canterbury, and for more than seven centuries the place was closely associated with the See. Among the Archbishops who sometimes resided at Hayes was Anselm, who is commemorated by St. Anselm's Church. The limbs of the pall also suggested runways and together with the wings referred to nearby London Airport. The cog-wheels stood for industry in general and the lightning flashes to the electrical industries in particular. The circlet of brushwood and deer referred to the name 'Hayes' which is derived from 'Hesa', which was a brushwood enclosure used as a trap for deer. The seax (Saxon sword) came from the arms of Middlesex and the Saxon crown referred to the fact that in that period parts of the district were royal property.

The present coat of arms of the London Borough of Hillingdon use the cog-wheel, the stag (as the sinister supporter) and the motto "Forward" from the coat of arms of the former Hayes and Harlington Urban District on its coat of arms.

== See also ==
- Hayes Cottage Hospital
