= Hillingdon =

Suburban area within the London Borough of Hillingdon

Coordinates: 51.5329°N 0.4550°W

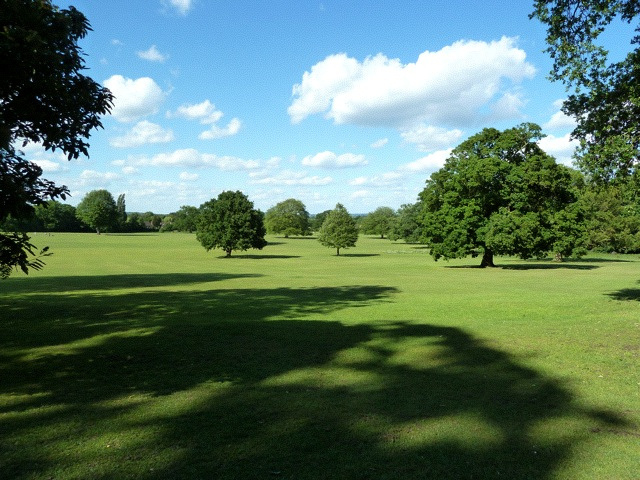
- Hillingdon Court Park

- Location within Greater London
- OS grid reference: TQ071827
  - Charing Cross: 14.2 mi (22.9 km) E
- London borough: Hillingdon
- Ceremonial county: Greater London
- Region: London
- Country: England
- Sovereign state: United Kingdom
- Post town: UXBRIDGE
- Postcode district: UB8, UB10
- Dialling code: 020; 01895
- Police: Metropolitan
- Fire: London
- Ambulance: London
- UK Parliament: Uxbridge and South Ruislip
- London Assembly: Ealing and Hillingdon

Hillingdon is an area of Uxbridge within the London Borough of Hillingdon, centred 14.2 miles (22.8 km) west of Charing Cross. It was an ancient parish in Middlesex that included the market town of Uxbridge. During the 1920s the civil parish bore a rapid, planned increase in population and housing, and was absorbed by Uxbridge Urban District in 1929. It has formed part of Greater London since 1965.

Much of Hillingdon has lasting, albeit minor, administrative effect as the current Hillingdon East ward for electing councillors to Hillingdon London Borough Council. In November 2010, the ward had a recorded population of 12,403.

== History ==
=== Toponymy ===
The name Hillingdon appears in the Domesday Book (1086) as Hillendone, possibly meaning "hill of a man named Hille". The name could also mean 'hill of a woman named Hilda'.

=== Local government ===
Hillingdon was an ancient parish, and had within it the chapelry of Uxbridge, which became a separate civil parish in 1866. When a local board of health was created for Uxbridge, the western part of Hillingdon parish was included within it. Under the Local Government Act 1894, Hillingdon parish was divided in two along the boundary of the board of health district. Hillingdon West became, with Uxbridge, part of the Uxbridge Urban District. Hillingdon East, now governed by the Hillingdon East Parish Council, became part of the Uxbridge Rural District. Uxbridge Rural District and the parish council were abolished in 1928, with the Hillingdon East parish being added to the Uxbridge Urban District. Both Hillingdon East and Hillingdon West parishes were abolished in 1938 and added to Uxbridge parish. In 1965, under the London Government Act 1963, Hillingdon became the name of the westernmost borough of Greater London. At the 1891 census (the last before the abolition of the parish), Hillingdon had a population of 10,797.

=== Urban development ===
The A40 (Western Avenue) was rerouted in the early 1990s to run slightly north of its original route, thereby allowing traffic to flow without interruption at the junction of Hillingdon Circus. Hillingdon tube station was required to be demolished in order for the new road to be constructed, and a new station was opened further south along the line in 1994, winning the Underground Station of the Year award for that year.

== Parliamentary constituency ==
Hillingdon is a traditional Conservative stronghold lying within the Uxbridge and South Ruislip constituency, represented from 2015 until 2023 by Boris Johnson. Before that, John Randall MP had represented the constituency since 1997, following the death of fellow Conservative Sir Michael Shersby.

== Education ==
Primary schools in Hillingdon include Oak Farm Juniors, St Bernadette's Roman Catholic Primary School, St Helen's College, Hillingdon Primary and Ryefield Primary.

Secondary schools, ACS Hillingdon, Bishopshalt School, Oak Wood School, Vyners School and Swakeleys School for Girls.

Moorcroft School in Colham Green is a special school, run by the Eden Academy Trust. It was formerly located at Moorcroft Park on Harlington Road, the old Moorcroft House hospital site.

== Transport ==
Hillingdon tube station is served by the Metropolitan and Piccadilly lines of the London Underground.

West Ruislip tube station is served by the Central line of the London Underground.

The Oxford Tube and Oxford X90 services between Oxford and central London also serve Hillingdon.

Bus route U2 serves Hillingdon, operating between Uxbridge station and Brunel University.

Bus route A10 connects Uxbridge to Heathrow Central Bus Station.

== Landmarks ==
=== Church of St John the Baptist ===
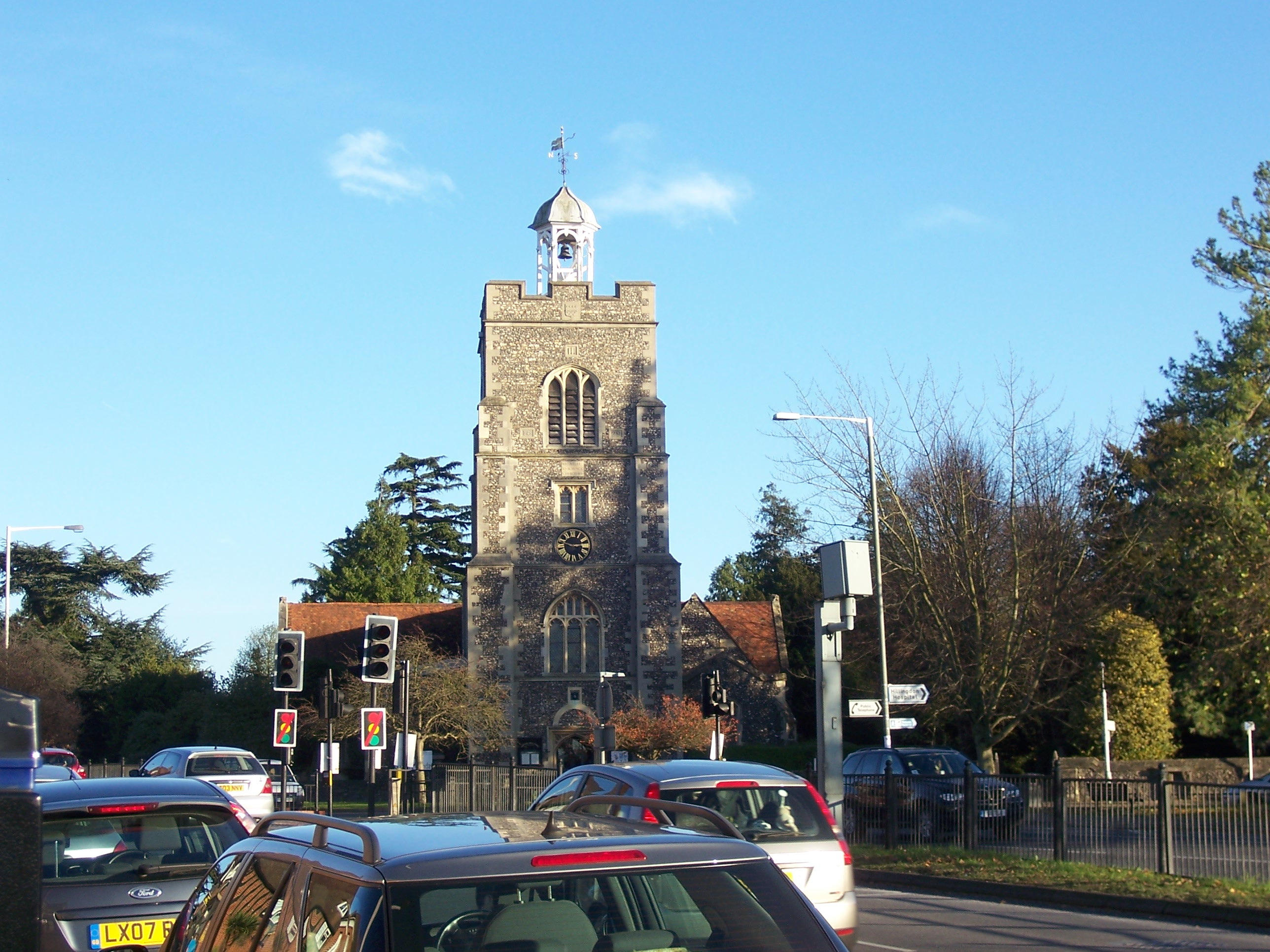
The Church of St John the Baptist

The church of St John the Baptist stands at the top of Hillingdon Hill, at its junction with Royal Lane. It was built in 1629, replacing an earlier building deemed to have become unsafe. In 1846, the architect George Gilbert Scott (father of George Gilbert Scott Junior) was asked to design an extension, as the increasing population meant the church was becoming too cramped. This extension was completed between 1847 and 1848 by the Fassnidge builders from Uxbridge.

On 8 November 1940, a bomb fell on the south side of the church, damaging many of the windows on the south and east sides of the church. The windows were repaired after the war. The barrel roof of the chancel was renovated in 1953 to commemorate the coronation of Elizabeth II. In 1964, a vestry was built on the north-eastern side of the church. There is a notable brass on the north wall of the south aisle dedicated to John, 8th Baron Strange of Knokin and his wife Jacquetta (1509). The nearest station to the church is Uxbridge which is at the distance of 1.73 km.

=== Hillingdon Court ===
Hillingdon Court was built in 1858 by Sir Charles Mills as his family home, after he had bought separate adjacent properties in Vine Lane. Both buildings were demolished and the plots combined to allow the construction of the new property. The mansion remained in the family's ownership until Charles Mills, 2nd Baron Hillingdon died in 1919. Part of the estate was bought by the local authority, while the mansion was bought by the Roman Catholic Order of the Sacred Heart and became a nursing home in 1920. After the Second World War, the mansion became a girls' school, and in 1978 it was bought by ACS International Schools to become ACS Hillingdon. Under the ownership of ACS International Schools, the mansion has been extended and converted in parts to meet the needs of a school. The area of land bought by the local authority remains today as Hillingdon Court Park.

== Notable people ==
- Actor Michael Anderson Jr., was born in Hillingdon
- Actor and comedian Bernard Miles lived at Hillingdon Heath for a time
- Writer A. M. Burrage (1889–1956) was born in Hillingdon
- Comedian James Corden was born in Hillingdon
- Gerry and Sylvia Anderson, famous for "Thunderbirds" and other Supermarionette series, lived in Hillingdon
- Rhythmic gymnast Rachel Ennis was born in Hillingdon
- Actress Lynne Frederick (1954–1994) was born in Hillingdon
- Actor Denis Gilmore was born in Hillingdon
- Kwame Kwei-Armah was born in Hillingdon
- Conductor and composer Eugene Goossens (1893–1962) lived in Hillingdon
- Actor Huw Higginson was born in Hillingdon
- Actress Elspeth March (1911–1999) lived in Hillingdon
- Comic actor and comedian Alfred Marks (1921–1996) lived in Hillingdon
- Screenwriter and film director Simon Monjack (1970–2010) was born in Hillingdon
- Singer and songwriter Claire Richards was born in Hillingdon and attended Bishopshalt School
- Meinhardt Schomberg (1641–1719) built and lived in Hillingdon House
- Actor and director Tony Tanner was born in Hillingdon
- Actress Heather Thatcher (1896–1987) lived in Hillingdon at the time of her death
- Footballer Ray Wilkins was born in Hillingdon
- Musician Ronnie Wood was born in Hillingdon
- Footballer Glenn Hoddle was born in Hillingdon
- Footballer Tariq Lamptey was born in Hillingdon

== See also ==
- Hillingdon Heath
- 2010 Hillingdon Council election
- Elthorne Hundred
- UB postcode area
