= Municipal Borough of Uxbridge =

Former local government area in the UK

Coordinates: 51.56°N 0.47°W

Uxbridge
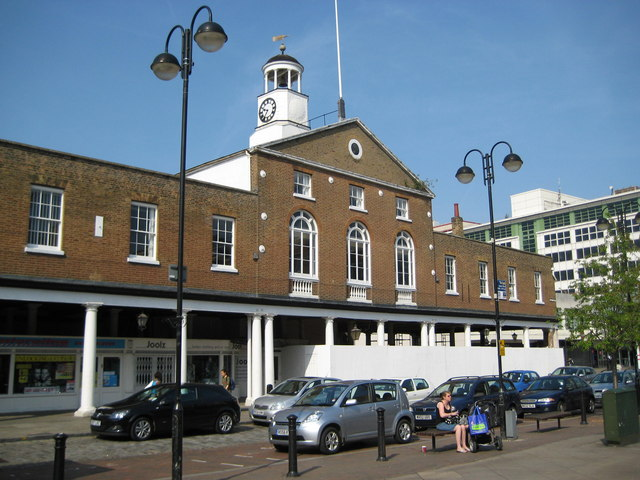
- Uxbridge Market House: the council's meeting place until 1927

- Uxbridge within Middlesex in 1961
- Area
  - 1894: 868 acres (3.5 km^{2})
  - 1965: 4,143 acres (16.8 km^{2})
- Population
  - 1901: 8,585
  - 1961: 63,941
- History
  - Created: 1849
  - Abolished: 1965
  - Succeeded by: London Borough of Hillingdon
- Status: Local board of health (1849 - 1894) Urban district (1894 - 1955) municipal borough (from 1955)

Uxbridge was a local government district in north west Middlesex, England, from 1849 to 1965, seated in the town of Uxbridge.

== History ==
Uxbridge was one of the first towns in England to adopt the Public Health Act 1848 in 1849 and form a local board of health. Under the Local Government Act 1894 the local board district was replaced by an urban district.

Until 1927 the council met in a council chamber on the upper floor of Uxbridge Market House on the High Street, which had been built in 1788, and had its offices at various locations in the town. In 1927 the council moved to a converted house called Southfields at 265 High Street, which served as both its offices and meeting place.

The district initially consisted of the parishes of Uxbridge and Hillingdon West. In 1929 it was enlarged by gaining from Uxbridge Rural District the parishes of Cowley, Harefield, Hillingdon East and Ickenham. The parishes were abolished in 1938 in order to create an enlarged Uxbridge parish covering the same area as the district.

In 1955 the urban district council successfully petitioned for a charter of incorporation and became a municipal borough.

In 1965 the borough was abolished and its former area transferred to Greater London and used to form part of the London Borough of Hillingdon. The council's former headquarters at Southfields was subsequently demolished and Hillingdon Civic Centre built on the site.

== Coat of arms ==
Granted in 1948, the coat of arms of the borough was: Or on a pile gules between two fountains an eagle displayed of the field. Crest: On a wreath of the colours issuant from a circlet composed of four chrysanthemums stalked and leaved proper a demi-lion gules supporting a seax blade upwards proper pommel and hilt or. Supporters: On the dexter side an heraldic tiger or and on the sinister side a Pegasus argent hoofed and crined azure both gorged with an astral crown vert and pendent therefrom a plate fimbriated also vert the dexter plate charged with a garb proper and the sinister with a cross throughout gules.

The pile is from the arms of the ancient Basset family and the heraldic fountains refer to the district's rivers. The eagle is from the arms of the Paget family, Earls of Uxbridge, a title now borne by the Marquess of Anglesey; and also alludes to Uxbridge RAF Depot and Northolt Airport. The chrysanthemums refer to the horticultural industry; the nurseries of the town specialize in these flowers. The national lion holds a seax (Saxon sword) from the arms of the County Council of Middlesex. The tiger is from the arms of the Marquess of Anglesey and the pegasus further represents Uxbridge's connection with the RAF. The green astral crowns refer to the Green Belt, the wheatsheaf to brewing, corn growing and the corn merchant industry. The red cross from the arms of the City of London refers to Greater London.

The present coat of arms of the London Borough of Hillingdon use the heraldic tiger, red lion crest and eagle from the former Borough of Uxbridge on its coat of arms.

== Notable Staff ==
- The Chair of Uxbridge Urban District Council Luther Bouch represented the Urban District Councils Association on the Nurses Salaries Committee chaired by Lord Rushcliffe which published two reports in 1943.
