= Ruislip-Northwood Urban District =

Former urban district in Middlesex, UK

Ruislip-Northwood
- Urban district
- Ruislip-Northwood within Middlesex in 1961
- Area
  - 1911/1931: 6,585 acres (26.6 km^{2})
  - 1961: 6,584 acres (26.6 km^{2})
  - Coordinates: 51.591°N 0.430°W
- Population
  - 1911: 6,217
  - 1931: 16,042
  - 1961: 72,791
- Density
  - 1911: 0.94/acre
  - 1931: 2.44/acre
  - 1961: 11.05/acre
- History
  - Origin: Ruislip parish
  - Created: 1904
  - Abolished: 1965
  - Succeeded by: London Borough of Hillingdon
- Status: Urban district
- Government: Ruislip-Northwood Urban District Council
  - HQ: Oaklands Gate
  - Motto: Latin: 'Non Progredi Est Regredi'; Not to go forward is to go backward.

Ruislip-Northwood was an urban district in west Middlesex, England, from 1904 to 1965. From its inception Ruislip-Northwood fell within the Metropolitan Police District and from 1933 it was part of the London Passenger Transport Area.

The urban district council presided over a huge increase in population as the Metropolitan Railway gave rise to many new development opportunities. This created many challenges to improve public services and housing while preserving the area's heritage sites. In 1931 King's College, Cambridge sold their final plots of land to the council, having been owners of much of the land in the manor of Ruislip since the mid-15th century.

The urban district was abolished in 1965 and its former area was incorporated into the newly established London Borough of Hillingdon, as part of Greater London.

== History ==
=== Creation ===
The urban district was created on 30 September 1904, covering the parish of Ruislip, which had previously been part of Uxbridge Rural District. The parish of Ruislip included Ruislip Manor, South Ruislip, Eastcote, and Northwood. The new urban district council held its first meeting at Northwood School on 1 October, the day after the district's formation.

An urban district council had been considered a year previously, in light of the expansion of areas within the parish, particularly Northwood. A report was prepared in 1903 which noted the population in Northwood—2,700 by that time, with 530 houses—compared with the largely rural character of the rest of Ruislip parish. The Metropolitan Railway extension from Harrow to Uxbridge was also discussed at the meeting on 28 October 1903, as a station was to be opened in Ruislip on the line. King's College, Cambridge, owners of much of the land in the parish, were planning to sell some for development in light of the new line. As a result of these events, the Ruislip Parish Council voted in favour of becoming an urban district.

=== Governance and developments ===
The urban district council consisted of nine councillors in 1904: the Chairman William Page Edwards; F. M. Elgood; H. J. Brewer; H. Ewer; William Gregory; S. Matheson; Rev. Harvey Roe; J. Westacott, and A. M. Hooper. A clerk was appointed, E. R. Abbot, for £100 per year. He remained in the position until 1931. By 1920 the number of councillors had reached 15.

The expansion of the Metropolitan Railway caused the district to experience a sharp rise in population—from 6,217 in 1911 to 72,791 in 1961—and an increase in suburban housebuilding, especially in the area termed Metro-land. Consequentially, the district was one of the first in England to devise a statutory planning scheme in 1914, following the Housing, Town Planning, etc. Act 1909. The council had been prompted to follow this new act by the chairman of the council, Mr. Elgood, an architect, and the Clerk to the council, Mr. Abbot. Members of the council had already raised concerns over some of the new building work around Eastcote and South Ruislip and the new development near Northwood station, which they described as "badly arranged and closely-packed".

Three divisions were established within the new council: Finance and General Purposes; Public Health, Buildings and Sewerage; and Highways. The council sought to save money from the outset; reducing the number of workmen employed on the highways from ten to seven and cancelling the cleaning of ditches beside the roads. The lowest-paid man working on the sewers was informed he would need to move within the district and take a pay cut from £1:6s to £1:3s or be made redundant. He accepted.

The urban district council worked with King's College, Cambridge, to establish plots of land for development around Ruislip and Ruislip Manor. A town planning competition was held, won by A & J Soutar, town planners from Wandsworth, who sought to create a symmetrical design spreading across Ruislip parish. Many of the woods and historic sites including Manor Farm were to be demolished and cleared as part of the plan, making way for a projected total of 7,642 homes, enough for 35,000 residents. Only the church in Ruislip, St. Martin's, would have been spared. An outline map was made public on 30 November 1910 with few objections. A local board inquiry followed on 17 February 1911, which required negotiations with landowners to allow for a full planning scheme to be compiled. This was presented in February 1913 with an adaptation of the original Soutars plan and received approval from the Local Government Board in September 1914.

Three roads with residential housing—Manor Way, Windmill Way, and Park Way—were completed before the outbreak of the First World War. All construction work was halted, and did not resume until 1919. The Ruislip Manor Cottage Society had been set up in 1911 to facilitate the construction of cottages and small housing in the area, though it did not manage to build as much as had been planned. As the council took on several plots in Eastcote, only four houses could be built by the society there. In Northwood, eighteen cottages were later built in 1926.

=== Development after the First World War ===
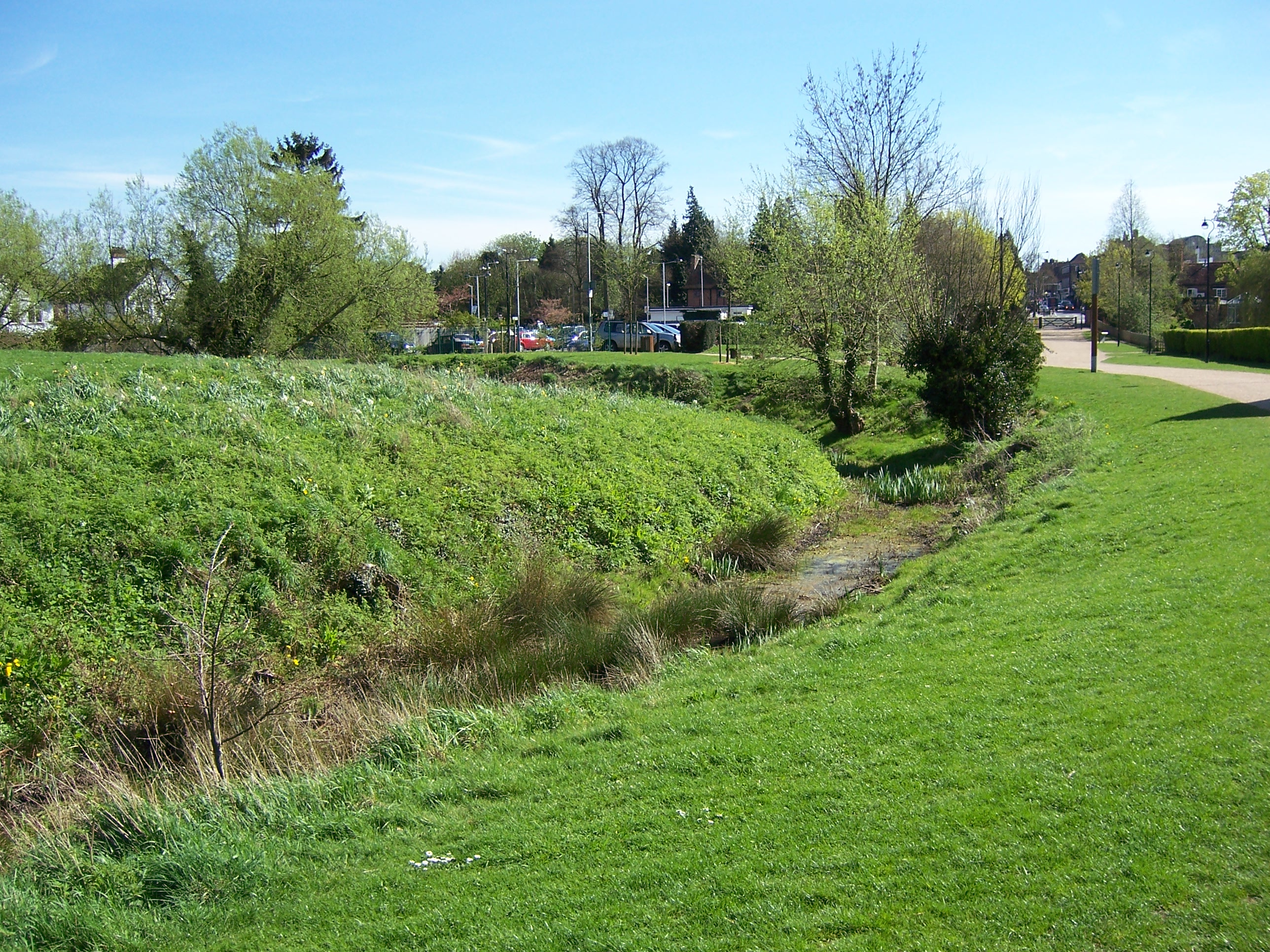
The remains of an ancient motte-and-bailey castle in Manor Farm

Manor Farm and the local woods were eventually saved from new developments in January 1930, after a member of the Royal Society of Arts visited to choose the buildings that should be conserved. The Great Barn and Little Barn were singled out, together with the old Post Office, the Old Bell public house, and the Priest's House of the local church. The woods were included in a sale by King's College, Cambridge, to the district in February 1931. Park Wood was sold for £27,300, with Manor Farm and the old Post Office included as a gift to the people of Ruislip. King's had wished to also present the wood as a gift but was required by the university and College's Act to receive payment, as it was the trustee of the land. Middlesex County Council contributed 75 per cent of the cost, as the urban district council argued that many of those who would make use of the land would be recreational day-trippers from outside the district. Under a 999-year lease, the council agreed to maintain the wood and ensure no new building was constructed without the permission of the county council. An area of the wood to the south was not included in the lease agreement and three residential roads were later constructed on it.

Copse Wood was purchased by Middlesex County Council and London County Council in 1936 for £23,250, joined by Mad Bess Wood in the same year. The urban district council purchased the 186 acres (75 ha) wood together with Middlesex and London County Councils for £28,000 in a compulsory purchase from Sir Howard Stransom Button. Sir Howard became High Sheriff of Middlesex in 1937.

The council purchased Haydon Hall and its 14.7 acres (5.9 ha) of ground in 1936, planning to build a civic centre there. The outbreak of the Second World War in 1939 caused the plan to be suspended, and it was never continued.

During the war, the urban district saw a high number of bombing raids by the Luftwaffe during The Blitz, between 8 September 1940 and 9 May 1941. A total of 57 raids were recorded with 241 high explosive bombs, 2000 incendiary bombs and 4 parachuted landmines falling on the area; 27 people were killed and a further 231 were injured.

A public hall was built on part of the Manor Farm site in 1965 and named Winston Churchill Hall. The land upon which it was built had been Barn Close and was bought by Councillor T. R. Parker in 1932 from King's College. He presented the land to the Ruislip Village Trust as the site of a future public hall and the Trust gave it to the urban district council in 1964 stipulating that that would be the sole use.

=== Abolition ===
The urban district was abolished in 1965 and its area formed part of the London Borough of Hillingdon in Greater London. By this time the population within the district had reached 75,000.

The Ruislip-Northwood name survived in the Ruislip-Northwood parliamentary constituency until 2010, when it was incorporated into the Ruislip, Northwood and Pinner constituency.

== Coat of arms ==
A coat of arms was granted in 1937. It is described as "argent, a hurst of oak-trees proper growing out of a grassy mount, and above them a roundel azure charged with a star of five points or; on a chief gules a silver mitre between two fleurs-de-lis or". It also had a crest, described as "on a wreath or the colours in front of two ears of rye slipped in saltire proper a boar passant sable armed and unguled."

The hurst of trees with a representation of the Pole Star above are a play on the name Northwood. The mitre and fleurs-de-lys refer to the Abbey of Bec Herlewin in Normandy, to whom the Lordship of Ruislip was granted, where there was a cell of the Order. The Manor was later seized by Henry V and granted as part of the endowment of King's College, Cambridge. The Abbey and the college were dedicated to St. Mary, one of whose symbols is a fleur-de-lis. The 'rye slips' are a play on the name Ruislip. The wild boar shows that the Lordship was an ancient one, granted when the land was forest roamed by wild boars.

The present coat of arms of the London Borough of Hillingdon use the Pole Star, fleur-de-lis, and rye stalks from the coat of arms of the former Ruislip-Northwood Urban District on its coat of arms.
