= London Borough of Hillingdon =

Coordinates: 51°30′N 0°27′W

- London borough
- Coat of arms Council logo
- Motto: Forward
- Hillingdon shown within Greater London
- Sovereign state: United Kingdom
- Constituent country: England
- Region: London
- Ceremonial county: Greater London
- Created: 1 April 1965
- Admin HQ: Hillingdon Civic Centre, Uxbridge

Government
  - Type: London borough council
  - Body: Hillingdon London Borough Council
  - London Assembly: Bassam Mahfouz (Lab) AM for Ealing and Hillingdon
  - MPs: David Simmonds (Con); John McDonnell (Lab); Danny Beales (Lab)

Area
  - Total: 44.67 sq mi (115.70 km^{2})
  - Rank: 180th (of 296)

Population (2025)
  - Total: 326,671
  - Rank: 40th (of 296)
  - Density: 7,312.7/sq mi (2,823.4/km^{2})
- Time zone: UTC (GMT)
  - Summer (DST): UTC+1 (BST)
- Postcodes: HA, TW, UB, WD
- Area codes: 01895, 01923, 020
- ISO 3166 code: GB-HIL
- ONS code: 00AS
- GSS code: E09000017
- Police: Metropolitan Police
- Website: www.hillingdon.gov.uk

The London Borough of Hillingdon is a London borough in Greater London, England. It forms part of outer London and West London, being the westernmost London borough. It was formed in 1965 from the districts of Hayes and Harlington, Ruislip-Northwood, Uxbridge, and Yiewsley and West Drayton. The borough includes Heathrow Airport and Brunel University, and is the second largest of the 32 London boroughs by area.

The main towns in the borough are Hayes, Ruislip, Northwood, West Drayton and Uxbridge. Hillingdon is the third least densely populated of the London boroughs, due to a combination of rural land in the north, RAF Northolt Aerodrome, and Heathrow Airport.

== History ==
The borough was created in 1965 under the London Government Act 1963, covering the combined area of the former Municipal Borough of Uxbridge, Hayes and Harlington Urban District, Ruislip-Northwood Urban District and Yiewsley and West Drayton Urban District. The area was transferred from Middlesex to Greater London to become one of the 32 London Boroughs. The councils involved were initially unable to decide upon a name, with Keith Joseph suggesting "Uxbridge" in October 1963, later revised to Hillingdon.

== Governance ==
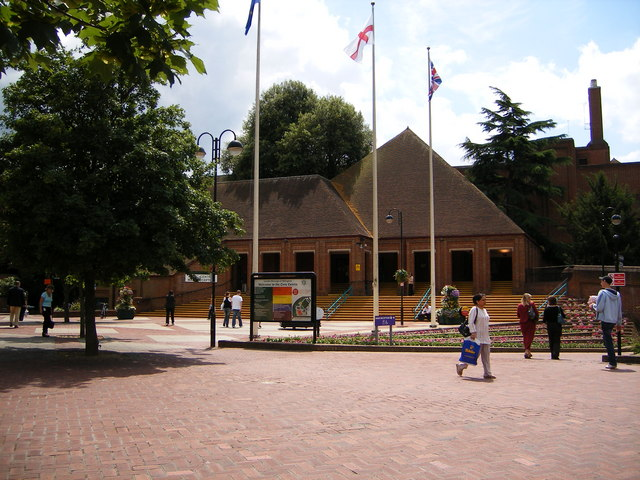
Hillingdon Civic Centre in Uxbridge

The local authority is Hillingdon Council, based at Hillingdon Civic Centre in Uxbridge.

The borough is divided into 21 wards:

- Belmore
- Charville
- Colham and Cowley
- Eastcote
- Harefield Village
- Hayes Town
- Heathrow Villages (including Harmondsworth, Sipson and Harlington)
- Hillingdon East
- Hillingdon West
- Ickenham and South Harefield
- Northwood
- Northwood Hills
- Pinkwell
- Ruislip
- Ruislip Manor
- South Ruislip
- Uxbridge
- West Drayton
- Wood End
- Yeading
- Yiewsley

=== Greater London representation ===
Since 2000, for elections to the London Assembly, the borough forms part of the Ealing and Hillingdon constituency. The Conservative candidate Richard Barnes won the 2000, 2004 and 2008 elections, and since the 2012 election the Labour candidate Onkar Sahota has served as the Ealing and Hillingdon London Assembly member. At the same election in 2012 Conservative candidate Boris Johnson won the largest share of Hillingdon's votes, becoming elected Mayor of London for a second term.

== Demographics ==
Population pyramid of Hillingdon in 2021

=== Population ===
From 2001 to 2011 the borough's population grew by 11.5% (4.4% above the England and Wales mean of 7.1%). By comparison Merton and Bromley grew by 4.5% and Tower Hamlets grew by 26.4%. The number of households increased from 2001 to 2011 by 3.3%, and the average number of people per household was 2.7.

Population
| Year | Pop. | ±% |
|---|---|---|
| 1801 | 9,232 | — |
| 1811 | 11,033 | +19.5% |
| 1821 | 12,788 | +15.9% |
| 1831 | 14,484 | +13.3% |
| 1841 | 18,329 | +26.5% |
| 1851 | 18,744 | +2.3% |
| 1861 | 20,672 | +10.3% |
| 1871 | 22,600 | +9.3% |
| 1881 | 24,528 | +8.5% |
| 1891 | 26,640 | +8.6% |
| 1901 | 32,548 | +22.2% |
| 1911 | 39,768 | +22.2% |
| 1921 | 58,681 | +47.6% |
| 1931 | 86,613 | +47.6% |
| 1941 | 137,278 | +58.5% |
| 1951 | 217,616 | +58.5% |
| 1961 | 226,074 | +3.9% |
| 1971 | 234,867 | +3.9% |
| 1981 | 226,256 | −3.7% |
| 1991 | 236,720 | +4.6% |
| 2001 | 242,435 | +2.4% |
| 2011 | 273,936 | +13.0% |
| 2024 estimate | 329,185 | +20.2% |
Source: A Vision of Britain through time, citing Census population 2024 estimate

=== Ethnicity ===
37.1% of the borough's population identified themselves as White British in the 2021 census. In the south-east of the borough, in particular Hayes, there is a large population of South Asian residents.

The wards where Black, Asian and Minority Ethnic Residents comprise the largest racial groups are:

- Barnhill (partly covering eastern Hayes, south of Yeading)
- Pinkwell (mostly the area around the railway station in southern Hayes)
- Townfield (part of eastern Hayes and west of Southall)
- Yeading (eastern Hayes)

Whites as a whole form 48.2% of the borough, Asian residents 33.3%, and Black residents 7.8%. In addition, the most common main language, English (77.9%), is followed by Punjabi (4.7%), Polish (1.7%), Tamil (1.6%) and Urdu (1.1%).

| Ethnic group | Year | | | | | | | | | | | |
| Ethnic group | 1971 estimations | | 1981 estimations | | 1991 census | | 2001 census | | 2011 census | | 2021 census | |
| Ethnic group | Number | % | Number | % | Number | % | Number | % | Number | % | Number | % |
| White: Total | – | 97.6% | 207,868 | 93.4% | 203,149 | 87.7% | 192,120 | 79.1% | 166,031 | 60.4% | 147,387 | 48.2% |
|---|---|---|---|---|---|---|---|---|---|---|---|---|
| White: British | – | – | – | – | – | – | 176,244 | 72.5% | 142,916 | 52.1% | 113,377 | 37.1% |
| White: Irish | – | – | – | – | – | – | 6,911 | 2.8% | 5,949 | 2.1% | 5,585 | 1.8% |
| White: Gypsy or Irish Traveller | – | – | – | – | – | – | – | – | 344 | 0.1% | 479 | 0.2% |
| White: Roma | – | – | – | – | – | – | – | – | – | – | 691 | 0.2% |
| White: Other | – | – | – | – | – | – | 8,965 | 3.7% | 16,822 | 6.1% | 27,255 | 8.9% |
| Asian or Asian British: Total | – | – | – | – | 22,061 | 9.5% | 33,048 | 13.6% | 69,253 | 25.0% | 101,938 | 33.3% |
| Asian or Asian British: Indian | – | – | – | – | 15445 | 6.7% | 23,234 | 9.6% | 36,795 | 13.4% | 57,341 | 18.7% |
| Asian or Asian British: Pakistani | – | – | – | – | 2008 | 0.9% | 3,816 | 1.6% | 9,200 | 3.3% | 14,243 | 4.7% |
| Asian or Asian British: Bangladeshi | – | – | – | – | 928 | 0.4% | 1,459 | 0.6% | 2,639 | 0.9% | 4,050 | 1.3% |
| Asian or Asian British: Chinese | – | – | – | – | 1185 | 0.5% | 1,883 | 0.8% | 2,889 | 1.0% | 3,184 | 1.0% |
| Asian or Asian British: Other Asian | – | – | – | – | 2495 | 1.1% | 4,539 | 1.9% | 17,730 | 6.4% | 23,120 | 7.6% |
| Black or Black British: Total | – | – | – | – | 3,810 | 1.6% | 8,006 | 3.3% | 20,082 | 7.2% | 23,955 | 7.9% |
| Black or Black British: African | – | – | – | – | 852 | 0.4% | 4,227 | 1.7% | 11,275 | 4.1% | 15,844 | 5.2% |
| Black or Black British: Caribbean | – | – | – | – | 2128 | 0.9% | 3,275 | 1.3% | 4,615 | 1.6% | 5,752 | 1.9% |
| Black or Black British: Other Black | – | – | – | – | 830 | 0.4% | 504 | 0.2% | 4,192 | 1.5% | 2,359 | 0.8% |
| Mixed or British Mixed: Total | – | – | – | – | – | – | 5,588 | 2.3% | 10,479 | 3.7% | 13,359, | 4.3% |
| Mixed: White and Black Caribbean | – | – | – | – | – | – | 1,427 | 0.6% | 2,719 | 0.9% | 3,151 | 1.0% |
| Mixed: White and Black African | – | – | – | – | – | – | 694 | 0.3% | 1,409 | 0.5% | 1,897 | 0.6% |
| Mixed: White and Asian | – | – | – | – | – | – | 1,983 | 0.8% | 3,602 | 1.3% | 4,201 | 1.4% |
| Mixed: Other Mixed | – | – | – | – | – | – | 1,484 | 0.6% | 2,749 | 1.0% | 4,110 | 1.3% |
| Other: Total | – | – | – | – | 2582 | 1.1% | 2,847 | 1.2% | 8,091 | 2.8% | 19,268 | 6.3% |
| Other: Arab | – | – | – | – | – | – | – | – | 2,925 | 1.0% | 4,462 | 1.5% |
| Other: Any other ethnic group | – | – | – | – | 2582 | 1.1% | 2,847 | 1.2% | 5,166 | 1.8% | 14,806 | 4.8% |
| Non-White: Total | – | 2.4% | 14,790 | 6.6% | 28,453 | 12.3% | 50,886 | 20.9% | 107,905 | 39.6% | 158,520 | 51.8% |
| Total | – | 100% | 222,658 | 100% | 231,602 | 100% | 243,006 | 100.00% | 273,936 | 100.00% | 305,907 | 100% |

=== Immigration ===
This list includes top-15 sources of immigration to Borough of Hillingdon for 2021 census:

| # | Country | Number |
|---|---|---|
| 1 | India | 27,738 |
| 2 | Pakistan | 6,466 |
| 3 | Poland | 6,398 |
| 4 | Afghanistan | 6,324 |
| 5 | Romania | 5,575 |
| 6 | Sri Lanka | 5,106 |
| 7 | Kenya | 3,670 |
| 8 | Ireland | 3,511 |
| 9 | Somalia | 3,281 |
| 10 | Nepal | 2,152 |
| 11 | Italy | 1,934 |
| 12 | Bangladesh | 1,927 |
| 13 | Portugal | 1,807 |
| 14 | Philippines | 1,515 |
| 15 | Nigeria | 1,514 |

== Parks and recreation ==
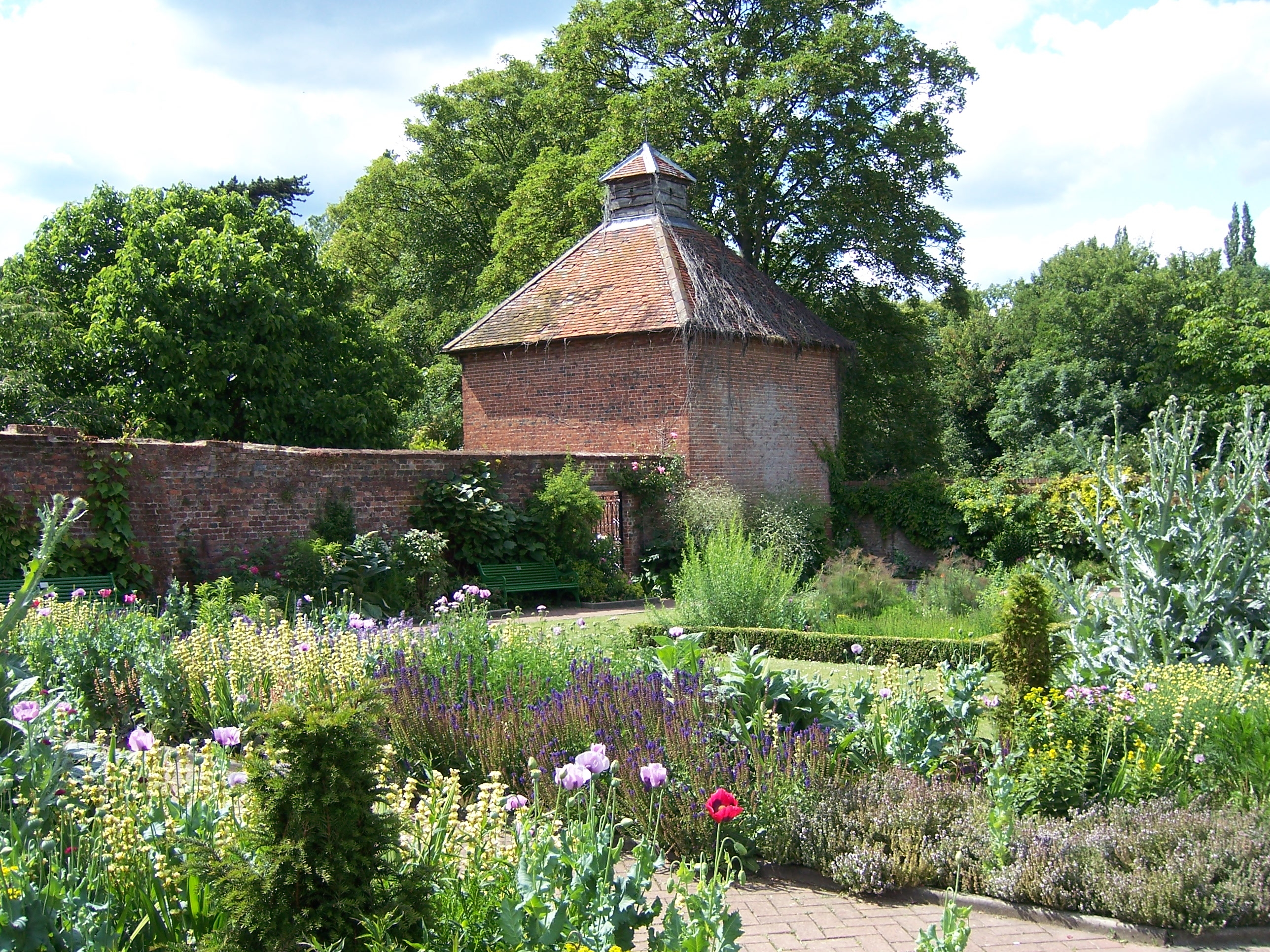
The Eastcote House walled garden

London Borough of Hillingdon from the air

The borough maintains over 200 green spaces, totalling around 1,800 acres (730 ha). As much of the area is within the Metropolitan Green Belt it was, in 2008, one of the least densely populated of all the London boroughs; open spaces range in size from the Colne Valley Regional Park by the River Colne in the north of the borough, to smaller gardens and parks such as the Norman Leddy Memorial Gardens and Lake Farm Country Park in the south of the borough.

Council leader Raymond Puddifoot had given a promise that green-belt land in Hillingdon would be safe on his watch: 'I can give a categoric assurance that under this administration we will never see a threat to the green belt.' In August 2012, however, Mr Puddifoot announced plans to build on green-belt (and longtime common land) site Lake Farm in the south of the borough. Dismissing the discontent of residents in the south of the borough, the Conservative majority of the council's planning committee peremptorily rubber-stamped the plans in March 2013.

Harmondsworth Moor, a park owned by the borough, is administered by British Airways on behalf of the borough. After British Airways planned to create a new headquarters in 1992, the airline agreed to convert a former landfill site into Harmondsworth Moor.

The Grand Union Canal passes through Hayes, Yiewsley, Cowley and Uxbridge in the borough. Ruislip Lido was built as a feeder reservoir for the canal, but was eventually disconnected and changed to become a recreational lido. Two Sites of Special Scientific Interest next to the canal, Frays Farm Meadows and Denham Lock Wood, are managed by the London Wildlife Trust.

The borough also operates children's centres, recreational areas for children of under five years of age and their families. The centres include: Barra Hall, Belmore, Cherry Lane, Colham Manor, Cornerstone, Cowley St. Laurence, Harefield, Hillside, McMillan Early Childhood Centre, Nestles Avenue, Oak Farm, and Uxbridge College (Hayes Campus).

The borough owns four theatres: the Beck Theatre in Hayes (which is operated on behalf of the borough by Trafalgar Entertainment), the Compass Theatre in Ickenham, the Winston Churchill Theatre and Hall (part of the Manor Farm site) and the Open Air Theatre in Barra Hall Park in Hayes.

=== Sport and leisure ===
The borough has seven Non-League football clubs:

- A.F.C. Hayes, who play at Farm Park, Hayes.
- Harefield United F.C., who play at Preston Park, Harefield.
- Hayes & Yeading United F.C., who play at Skyex Community Stadium, Hayes.
- Hillingdon Borough F.C. who play at the Middlesex Stadium, Ruislip.
- Northwood F.C. who play at the Northwood Park Stadium, Northwood.
- Uxbridge F.C. who play at Honeycroft, Yiewsley.
- Wealdstone F.C. who play at Grosvenor Vale, Ruislip.

The borough is also home to Hillingdon Outdoor Activity Centre (HOAC), a water sports and activity centre. The centre is home to a number of independently run sports clubs:

- Queensmead Sailing Club
- Hillingdon Rowing Club
- Hillingdon Junior Canoe Club
- Harrow Angling Club

== Economy ==
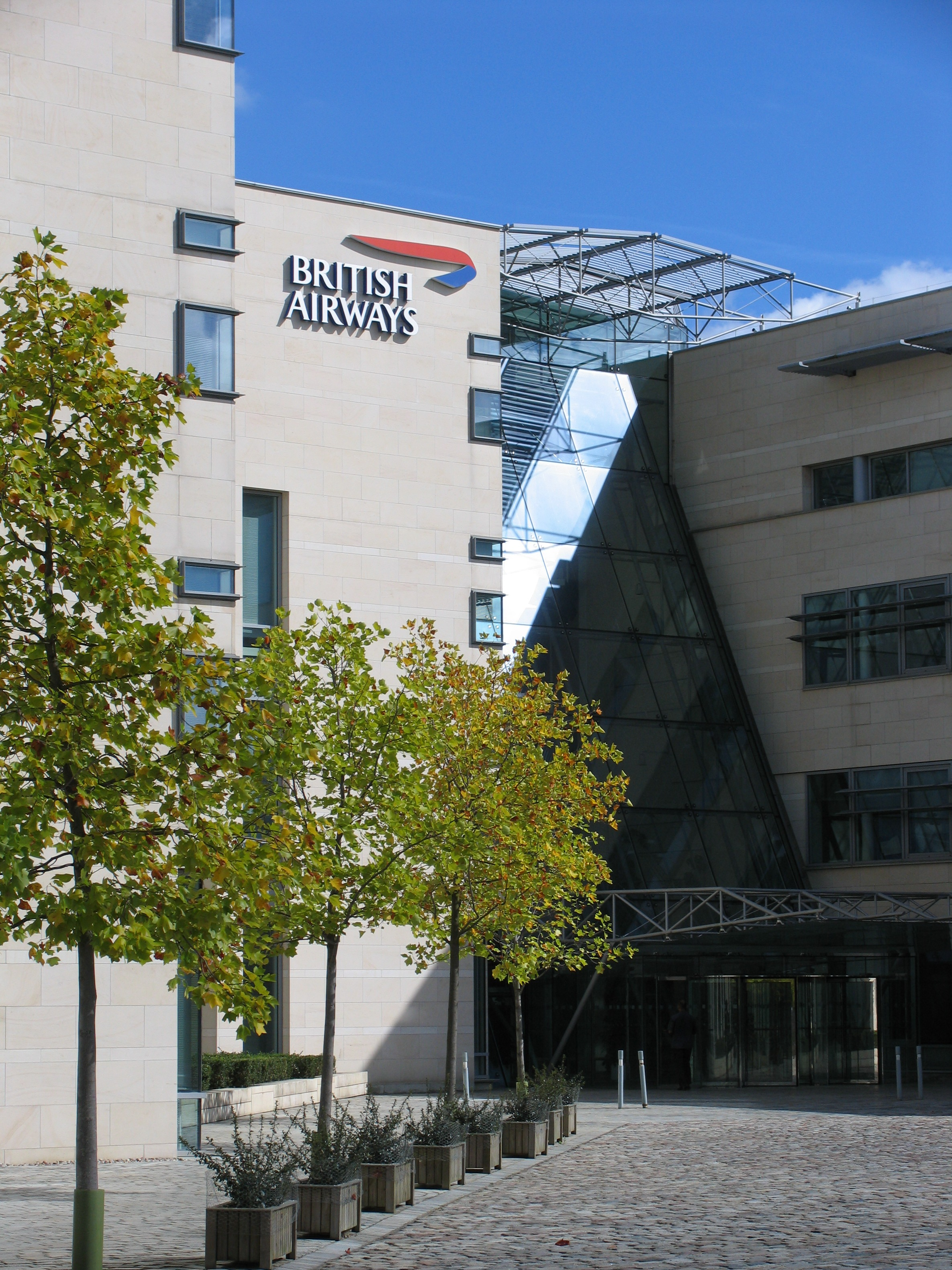
Waterside, the headquarters of British Airways in Harmondsworth

=== Economic history ===
The south's former strong connection with industry has diminished since the 1980s to be replaced by a preponderantly residential suburban population; the north has remained a consistently residential suburban area, although with significant swathes of rural land. The borough's residential areas expanded with the extension of the Metropolitan Railway from Harrow on the Hill to Uxbridge in the early 20th century and the gradual establishment of stops along the line, becoming known as "Metro-land".

=== Contemporary economy ===
Hillingdon has a large economy by national standards, ranked 14th out of 408 local area districts in Britain, and ranked fifth out of the London boroughs.

British Airways is headquartered in Waterside, Harmondsworth, in Hillingdon. The building officially opened in 1998. Prior to the opening of Waterside, the airline's head office was the Speedbird House at London Heathrow Airport. An office of American Airlines is located at the Orient House (HAA3) within Waterside.

In 2007 Cadbury Schweppes announced it would be moving to Uxbridge from Mayfair to cut costs. The company later split and Cadbury plc moved to its new head office in Cadbury House in the Uxbridge Business Park in June 2008.

Guoman Hotel Management (UK) Limited has its head office in the Thistle London Heathrow in West Drayton.

British Midland International had its training centre in Stockley Close, West Drayton. Hellenic Imperial Airways had its United Kingdom offices in the Axis House in Harlington. China Airlines had its UK office in the Hyde Park Hayes 3 (HPH3) in Hayes.

One of the predecessor organisations of British Airways, British Overseas Airways Corporation, had its head office in Speedbird House. The other predecessor, British European Airways, had its headquarters in South Ruislip, as did BEA Helicopters. During its existence the airline British Eagle had its head office on the grounds of Heathrow Airport.

A 2017 study by Trust for London and New Policy Institute found that there is a 22% poverty rate in Hillingdon, slightly below the London-wide figure of 27%. It also found that 24% of Hillingdon's local employees are low-paid, narrowly above the London average of 21%.

=== Government facilities ===
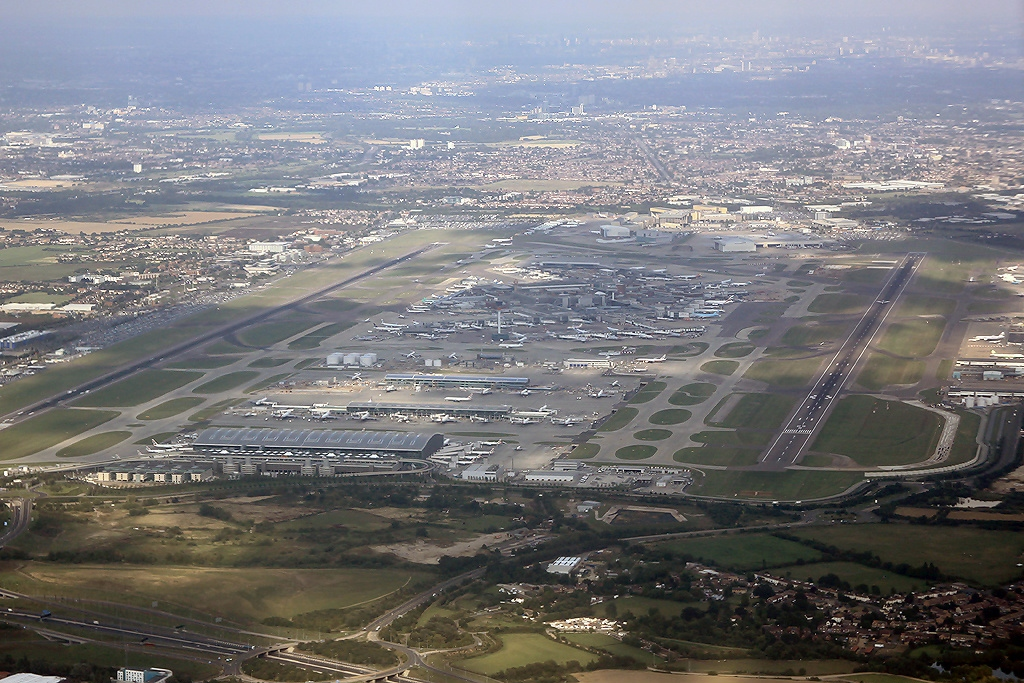
London Heathrow Airport

London Heathrow Airport is located in the borough and is one of the busiest airports in the world. It was originally used by the Royal Air Force. The British Government's UK Visas and Immigration has two immigration removal centres: Colnbrook Immigration Removal Centre and Harmondsworth Immigration Removal Centre in Harmondsworth.

The borough includes RAF Northolt and the former sites of RAF Eastcote, RAF South Ruislip, RAF West Drayton, RAF Ruislip 4MU, RAF West Ruislip and RAF Uxbridge.

== Education ==
The borough maintains 17 libraries: Charville, Eastcote, Harefield, Harlington, Hayes End, Hayes, Ickenham, Manor Farm, Northwood Hills, Northwood, Oak Farm, Ruislip Manor, South Ruislip, Uxbridge, West Drayton, Yeading, and Yiewsley.

Hillingdon has undertaken the largest school expansion programme in London, ensuring that all children within the borough can go to a school close to where they live.

In May 2011, Hillingdon Council received the Library Innovation of the Year award at the 2011 Bookseller Industry Awards.

Also within the borough are Brunel University and Uxbridge College's Uxbridge and Hayes campuses, as well as the Douay Martyrs Catholic Secondary School, St Bernadette Catholic Primary School and ACS Hillingdon International School.

The London Borough of Hillingdon also offers music lessons as part of the Hillingdon Music Service.

== Transport ==
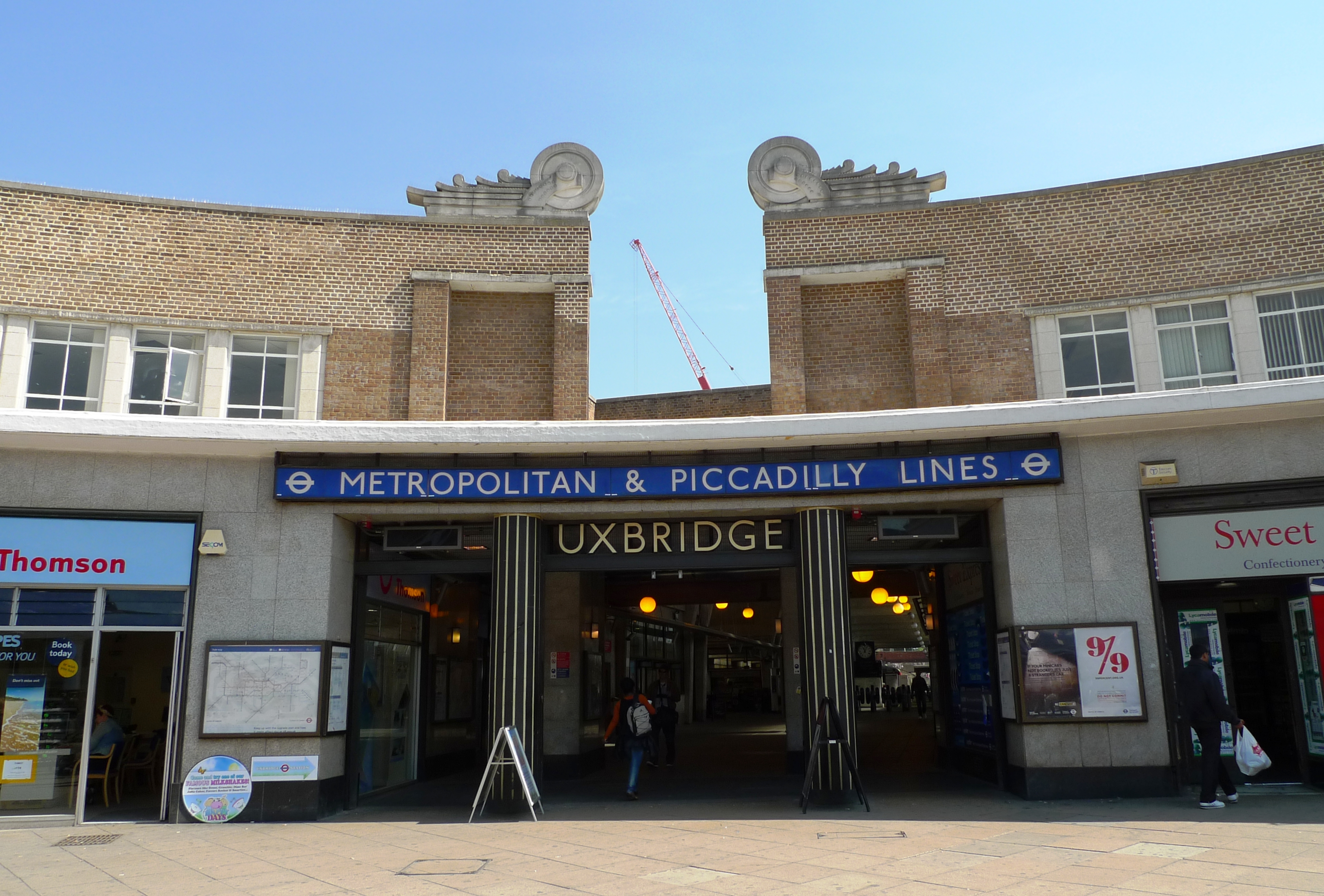
Uxbridge tube station

London Heathrow Airport is the busiest airport in Europe in terms of passenger numbers and the second busiest in the world in terms of international passenger numbers.

National Rail and London Underground stations in the borough are:

- Eastcote tube station
- Hatton Cross tube station
- Hayes and Harlington railway station
- Heathrow Terminals 2 & 3 railway station
- Heathrow Terminals 2 & 3 tube station
- Heathrow Terminal 4 railway station
- Heathrow Terminal 4 tube station
- Heathrow Terminal 5 station
- Hillingdon tube station
- Ickenham tube station
- Northwood Hills tube station
- Northwood tube station
- Ruislip Gardens tube station
- Ruislip Manor tube station
- Ruislip tube station
- South Ruislip station
- Uxbridge tube station
- West Ruislip station
- West Drayton railway station

In March 2011, the main forms of transport that residents used to travel to work were: driving a car or van, 34.5% of all residents aged 16–74; Underground, metro, light rail, tram, 7.9%; bus, minibus or coach, 7.9%; on foot, 4.6%; train, 2.8%; work mainly at or from home, 2.6%; passenger in a car or van, 2.0%.

The Royal Air Force station RAF Northolt is situated in South Ruislip near the A40 and the tube station. Most early RAF airfields were named after the nearest railway station; in this case Northolt Junction, the original name of South Ruislip station. The station has been redeveloped in recent years to house a number of additional military capabilities besides the RAF operations, and is popular with business people and politicians for private flights.

== Town twinning ==
Hillingdon is twinned with:

- Mantes-la-Jolie, France
- Schleswig, Schleswig-Holstein, Germany

The borough has been twinned with the French town of Mantes-la-Jolie and the German town of Schleswig since the Hayes & Harlington Urban District created the link in 1958. The twinning programme was reviewed in 2011 and it was suggested that the link with Schleswig be ended owing to a lack of contact between the towns. In December 2011, the borough decided instead to end the link with a second German town, Emden, citing administrative problems.

== Coat of arms ==
The coat of arms for the London Borough of Hillingdon was granted on 22 March 1965. Between 1973 and 1978, the borough's civic centre was built in Uxbridge.

== See also ==
- Hillingdon
- Hillingdon local elections

== Notes and references ==
Notes

Bibliography

- Cotton, Carolynne. (1994) Uxbridge Past. London: Historical Publications ISBN 0-948667-30-3
