= Lorraine Heggessey =

British producer and executive

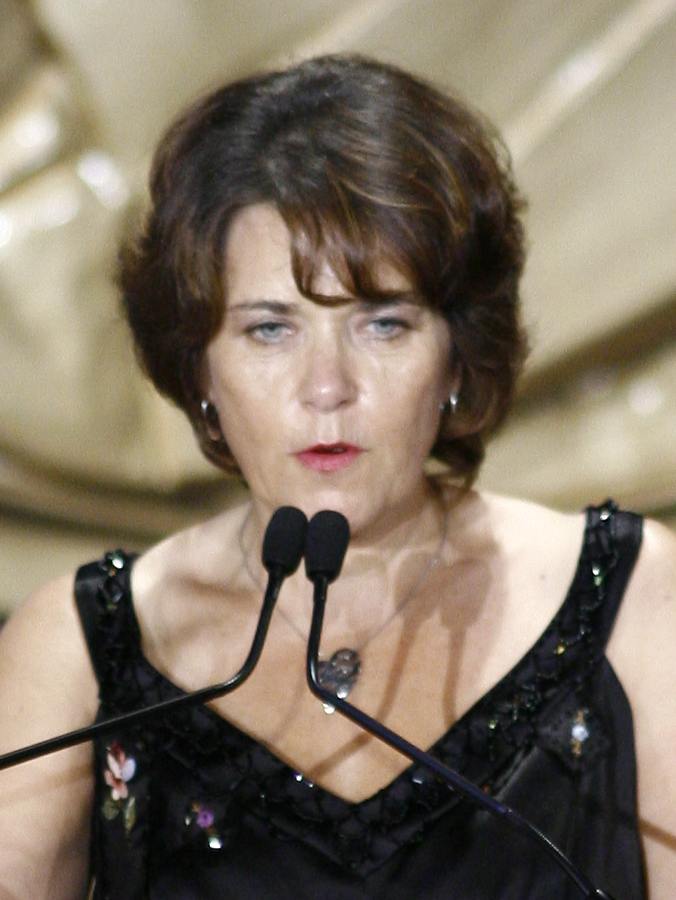
- Heggessey in 2007
- Born: Lorraine Sylvia Heggessey; 16 November 1956 (age 69); Hillingdon, Middlesex, England
- Education: Vyners Grammar School
- Alma mater: Collingwood College, Durham (BA)
- Employer(s): BBC; Talkback Thames
- Title: Controller of BBC One (2000–2005)

Lorraine Sylvia Heggessey (born 16 November 1956) is a British television producer and executive. From 2000 until 2005, she was the first woman to be Controller of BBC One, the primary television channel of the British Broadcasting Corporation. She has also served as the Chief Executive of the production company Talkback Thames. Until October 2019 Heggessey was the Chief Executive of The Royal Foundation.

== Early life, education and career ==
Heggessey was educated at Vyners Grammar School in Ickenham, Hillingdon and later earned an Upper Second Class BA Honours degree in English Language & Literature from Durham University (Collingwood College), before beginning her career in local newspaper journalism. She worked initially for the Westminster Press Group, where her first job was as a trainee reporter on the Acton Gazette local newspaper.

In 1978 she applied for a BBC News traineeship, but was rejected without an interview. She then worked voluntarily in hospital radio and gained a paid job on a local newspaper, before re-applying for the BBC traineeship the following year, this time successfully. She spent the next fifteen years working in current affairs programming in television.

== Career ==
=== Current affairs ===
By the early 1980s she had become a producer on the BBC's flagship current affairs series Panorama, before she left the staff of the BBC to join Thames Television's This Week, broadcast on the rival ITV network. She then moved on again, this time to the small independent production company Clark Productions, for whom she worked on Channel 4's current affairs programme Hard News. In the early 1990s, she and the film director Ken Loach collaborated on an edition of Hard News which investigated the treatment of trade unionist leader Arthur Scargill by The Daily Mirror newspaper and investigative journalist Roger Cook.

When Cook declined to be interviewed for the programme, Heggessey, along with Ken Capstick, Vice President of the Yorkshire NUM, employed one of his own tactics from his television series The Cook Report, "doorstepping" him outside the Birmingham hotel in which he was staying and pursuing him, with a camera crew and asking questions, down the street as he walked away.

She also worked on another Channel 4 documentary series, Dispatches, before returning to the BBC, where she founded the viewer feedback series Biteback. She also secured another notable television moment when she obtained the first interview with the notorious criminal "Mad" Frankie Fraser, for The Underworld documentary series. Working in the science department, she became Editor of the BBC One series QED, and then executive producer of the documentary series Animal Hospital and The Human Body.

=== Children's BBC ===
Heggessey was considering leaving the BBC again and returning to working in the independent sector, when she was offered the position of Head of Children's BBC. As her daughters were at the time aged four and eight, she decided to accept the role, later explaining that "Short of taking over Hamleys, this was the next best job for them." She took up this post in 1997.

It was as Head of Children's BBC that she became involved in the dismissal of Blue Peter presenter Richard Bacon. In October 1998, the News of the World newspaper revealed that Bacon had taken cocaine, and he was subsequently sacked from his job as a presenter on the high-profile children's programme. Heggessey appeared on-screen in a specially-recorded one-minute address to viewers shown directly before the first episode of Blue Peter to be screened following Bacon's sacking, on 19 October 1998, to explain to young viewers why Bacon had been dismissed, stating that he had "not only let himself and the team on Blue Peter down, but he has also let all of you down badly."

=== BBC One ===
In 1999 she was promoted to Director of Programmes and Deputy Chief Executive of the BBC's in-house production arm, BBC Production, responsible for supervising in-house output across all the various genres. She was in this role for little over a year however before she was promoted to Controller of BBC One, a post she took up on 1 November 2000. In this position she was responsible for co-commissioning the channel's output with the various heads of department — drama, news, etc. — and deciding the channel's overall strategy and schedule. She had previously been sounded out about the job in 1997, following Michael Jackson's departure, but had turned down the opportunity as she felt she was then not yet experienced enough.

During Heggessey's five years in charge, BBC One's audience share fell by 19.9%, to 23%, although this was in the context of declining audience figures across all British television channels due to increased competition from multichannel digital television. However, in 2001 BBC One overtook its main rival ITV1 in terms of annual audience share for the first time since the rival channel had launched in 1955, although much of this was down to the success of the channel's daytime television line-up, which had its own Controller in Jane Lush.

When Heggessey arrived at the channel in November 2000, she inherited two controversial schedule changes which had been implemented the previous month, at the behest of Director-General of the BBC Greg Dyke; the main evening BBC News bulletin had been moved from 9pm to 10pm, and Panorama moved from a Monday night prime time slot to a later slot on Sunday nights. The moving of Panorama attracted criticism that BBC One was sidelining serious programming in favour of more populist output. Heggessey publicly defended the decision despite it not being hers, claiming that Panorama's ratings would have "dwindled" in its previous slot.

Heggessey and the BBC's Controller of Drama Commissioning, Jane Tranter, took advantage of the weekday 9pm slot opened up by the moving of the news to commission new popular drama output, such as the successful Waking the Dead (2000–2011) and Spooks (2002–2011). Celebrity dancing show Strictly Come Dancing (2004–present) was also a popular success on Saturday nights and continues to be.

Heggessey did later concede in a 2005 interview with The Independent newspaper that arts programming had suffered a cutback under her control of BBC One. However, she did respond to this omission following criticism from the Board of Governors of the BBC by commissioning programmes such as the arts documentary series Imagine... (2003–present) and A Picture of Britain (2005).

During her early days at BBC One, Heggessy criticized the "Balloon" idents the channel had been using for its between-programme idents since 1997 for being "slow and distant" and so, in 2002, after much speculation, she took the decision to abandon the "Balloon" idents (and the traditional "Globe" idents the channel had used in a variety of forms since 1963). They were replaced by a new style of on-air identity for the channel, the "Rhythm & Movement" idents. The new idents attracted some criticism for going against the traditions of the channel and pandering to political correctness, as they featured activities performed by people of various ethnicities.

One of Heggessey's most notable decisions and last major success at the channel was the re-commissioning of the science-fiction drama series Doctor Who, which had been a popular hit in previous decades but ceased production in 1989. Heggessey and Jane Tranter commissioned a new version of the series in September 2003, after Heggessey had spent two years persuading the BBC's commercial arm, BBC Worldwide, to abandon their attempts to make a feature film version of the programme and allow it instead to return to BBC One. The new version of Doctor Who (2005–present) debuted on 26 March 2005 and became a critical and popular hit, with Paul Hoggart of The Times newspaper describing the series as "a joyful, exuberant reinvention and a fine legacy from Ms Heggessey."

On 14 February 2005 it was announced that Lorraine Heggessey was to leave the BBC to take up the post of Chief Executive at production company Talkback Thames. She left on 15 April. Five months after her departure, BBC One was named "Channel of the Year" at the Edinburgh Television Festival, primarily on the strength of Heggessey commissions such as Strictly Come Dancing and Doctor Who.

=== Talkback Thames ===
At Talkback Thames, Heggessey was responsible for overseeing the production of high-profile programmes such as ITV1's The Bill and The X Factor, BBC One's QI and Channel 4's Green Wing. She was also responsible for delivering to BBC One in early 2006 two Stephen Poliakoff dramas that she herself had commissioned before she left the channel, Friends and Crocodiles and Gideon's Daughter, the latter of which went on to win two Golden Globe Awards (Best Actor in a Mini-series for Bill Nighy and Best Supporting Actress in a Mini-series for Emily Blunt) in 2007.

In June 2010 it was announced that she was leaving her post of Chief Executive with Talkback Thames.

=== Boom Pictures ===
Heggessey returned to the television industry in July 2012, when she became co-owner and Executive Chairman of the new Cardiff-based independent production company Boom Pictures. In June 2014 Heggessey left the company, the success created by her led to its subsequent acquisition by ITV Studios.

=== The Royal Foundation ===
In April 2017, Heggessey was appointed Chief Executive of The Royal Foundation, the primary philanthropic and charitable vehicle for The Duke and Duchess of Cambridge and The Duke and Duchess of Sussex. She left the position on 1 October 2019.

== Personal life ==
Heggessy is married to Ron de Jong, a musician and composer, and they have two daughters.

Media offices
Preceded by Peter Salmon	Controller of BBC One; 2000–2005	Succeeded by Peter Fincham
