= St Giles' Church, Ickenham =

Coordinates: 51°33′53″N 0°26′38″W

St Giles' Church
- Parish Church of St Giles
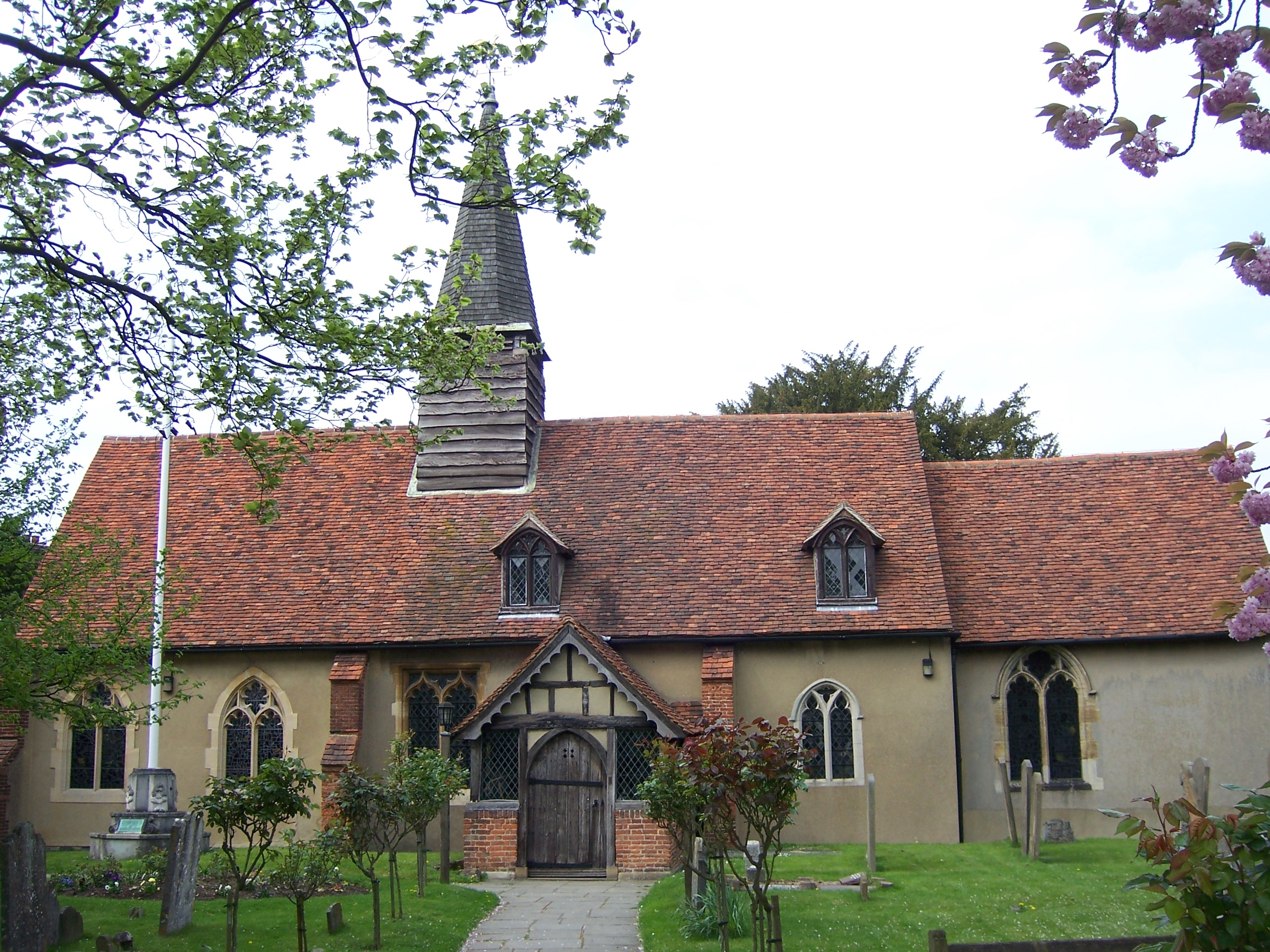
- St Giles' Church, viewed from the entrance of the churchyard
- St Giles' Church
- Location: St Giles' Church, Swakeleys Road, Ickenham
- Country: England
- Denomination: Church of England
- Website: St Giles' Church, Ickenham

History
- Dedication: Saint Giles
- Consecrated: 1335

Architecture
- Years built: 1335

Administration
- Diocese: London

Clergy
- Rector: Rev. Christine Britton

St. Giles' Church is the parish church in Ickenham, within the London Borough of Hillingdon in England.

The church is located in the centre of Ickenham, at the intersection of Swakeleys Road and Long Lane.

The oldest parts of the church, the nave and chancel, date back to 1335. Other extensions have been added over the years. Inside the church, several memorials exist to the prominent families of Ickenham.

== History ==
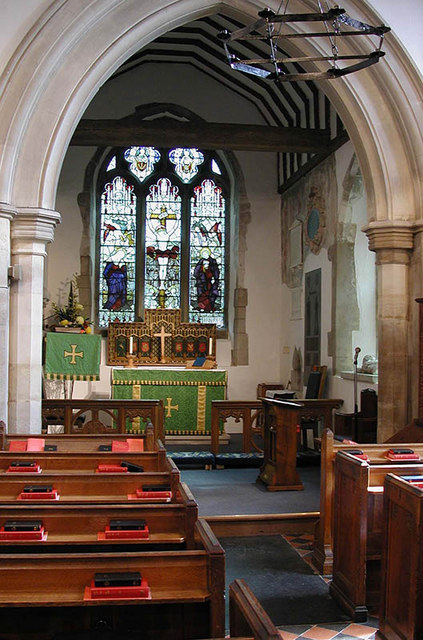
Interior of the East End

Ickenham appears in the Domesday Book under the name "Ticheham", although there is no mention of a church. One did exist in the nearby parish of Harefield and it is believed that residents of Ickenham travelled there for church services.

The original nave and chancel of St Giles' church have been dated to 1335 while the nave was extended west in 1959. The bell turret was built in the 15th century and a north aisle added in 1575.

William Say contributed the cost of the bricks for the north aisle, though he expected to be repaid eventually. Pews were incorporated into the aisle for Say's family, when it was common for worshippers to stand or kneel in church. William Say made his will in March 1582, shortly before his death, in which he indicated his wish to be buried within the aisle. He also suggested that the debt the parishioners held could be reduced by 3s and 4d for each burial of a member of his household.

William Say is remembered in the church by a brass memorial showing himself, his wife Isabel and their two children. His son Robert died in 1584 and has a brass memorial, of him alone.

A memorial to Robert Clayton, the baby son of Sir Robert and Dame Martha Clayton, is on a windowsill within the church, in the shape of a sleeping baby. He was buried within the chapel for the manor of Swakeleys in the north aisle. The boy had died a few hours after his birth in August 1665 at Swakeleys House, where his parents were staying as guests of Lady Harrington. Sir Robert was an alderman of London but the couple were staying in Ickenham to escape the Great Plague; he later became Lord Mayor of London in 1679.

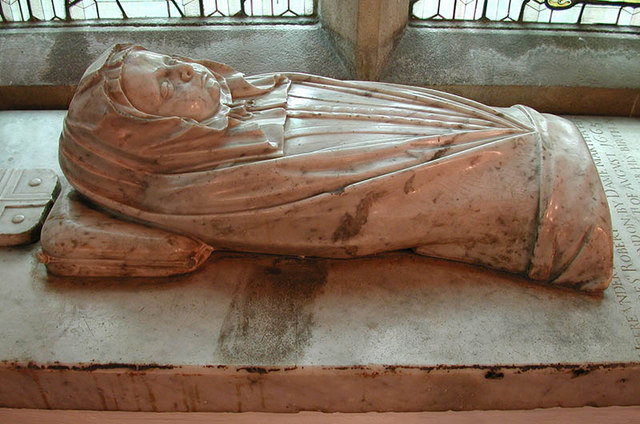
Memorial to Robert Clayton, the baby son of Sir Robert and Dame Martha Clayton

The nephew of Sir Robert Vyner, Thomas Vyner, was buried in the Swakeleys chapel in 1907, despite his having died in Rome. By 1914, the chapel for Swakeleys had become full, and the church authorities decided to clear it by burying the coffins in the graveyard. The memorial to Robert Clayton was moved from his coffin to the windowsill at this point. A doorway leading from the old chapel into the main church was built in 1918.

Cyril Bibby and Frances Hirst were married in the church in 1936. Within the church is a plaque honouring the men of the village who died in the First World War, which is listed by the Church of England as a Grade II. The altar rail is dedicated to those of the church's youth fellowship who died during the Second World War. Their names are remembered on a nearby plaque. A further memorial to members of the fellowship killed in the war is the Book of Remembrance. The Middlesex Regiment and Home Guard is commemorated by two stained glass windows in the south aisle of the church.

The church celebrated its 650th anniversary in the 1980s by forming a covenant with the United Reformed Church, also in Ickenham on Swakeleys Road.

== List of Rectors ==
John Payne (1335)
John Bradely (1399-1401)
John De Thorp (1401)
Robert Wakefield (1433)
William Cornish (1433-1441)
John More (1441-1444)
John Spygurnell (1444/5-1452)
Thomas Vesey (1452-1454)
Robert Haysand (1454-1455)
John Goffe (1456-1457/8)
George Bastwick (1457/8-1459)
Thomas Peny (alias Chandler) (1459-1462)
Richard Child (1462-1463)
James Derwent (1463-1464/5)
John Sawier (1464/5-1482)
Miles Beckwith (1482-1486)
George Percy (alias Gard) (1486)
Richard Roston (1486-1488/9)
Thomas Goodwyn (1488/9-1501)
William Wright (1502-1531)
John Dyer (1531-1568)
Henry Kendall (1568-1624)
Robert Say (1624)
Lancelot Harrison (1625-1635)
Andrew Cleere (or Dr. Clare) (1635-1650)
Nathanial Nicholls (1650)
William Beere (or Bird) (1660-1685)
John Glover (1686-1714)
John Shordich (1714-1725)
Samuel Oilman (1725)
Henry Jodrell (1725-1746/7)
Thomas Clark (1747-1796)
Henry Dearman (1796-1800)
Rev. Thomas Bracken (1800-1815)
Rev. John Addison (1815-1859)
Rev. Beauchamp Henry St. John Pell (1859-1907)
Canon W. Bury (1908-1919)
Hugh B. Langton (1920-1923)
D. W. W. Carmichael (1923-1933)
James B. King (1933-1949)
Frederick J. Evans (1949-1959)
Percy D. Kingston (1959-1964)
Archie C. Markby (1964-1968)
Rev. Victor Barry Wynburne (1968-1977)
Rev. Paul Kelly (1977-1994)
Rev. Philip Robinson (1995-2004) (Priest in Charge)
Rev. Adrian Guthrie (2005-2013)
Rev. Felicity Davies (2014-2023) (50th Rector)
Rev. Christine Britton (2024- )
