= Ickenham Hall =

Georgian mansion in Ickenham, London, England

Coordinates: 51.5621°N 0.4408°W

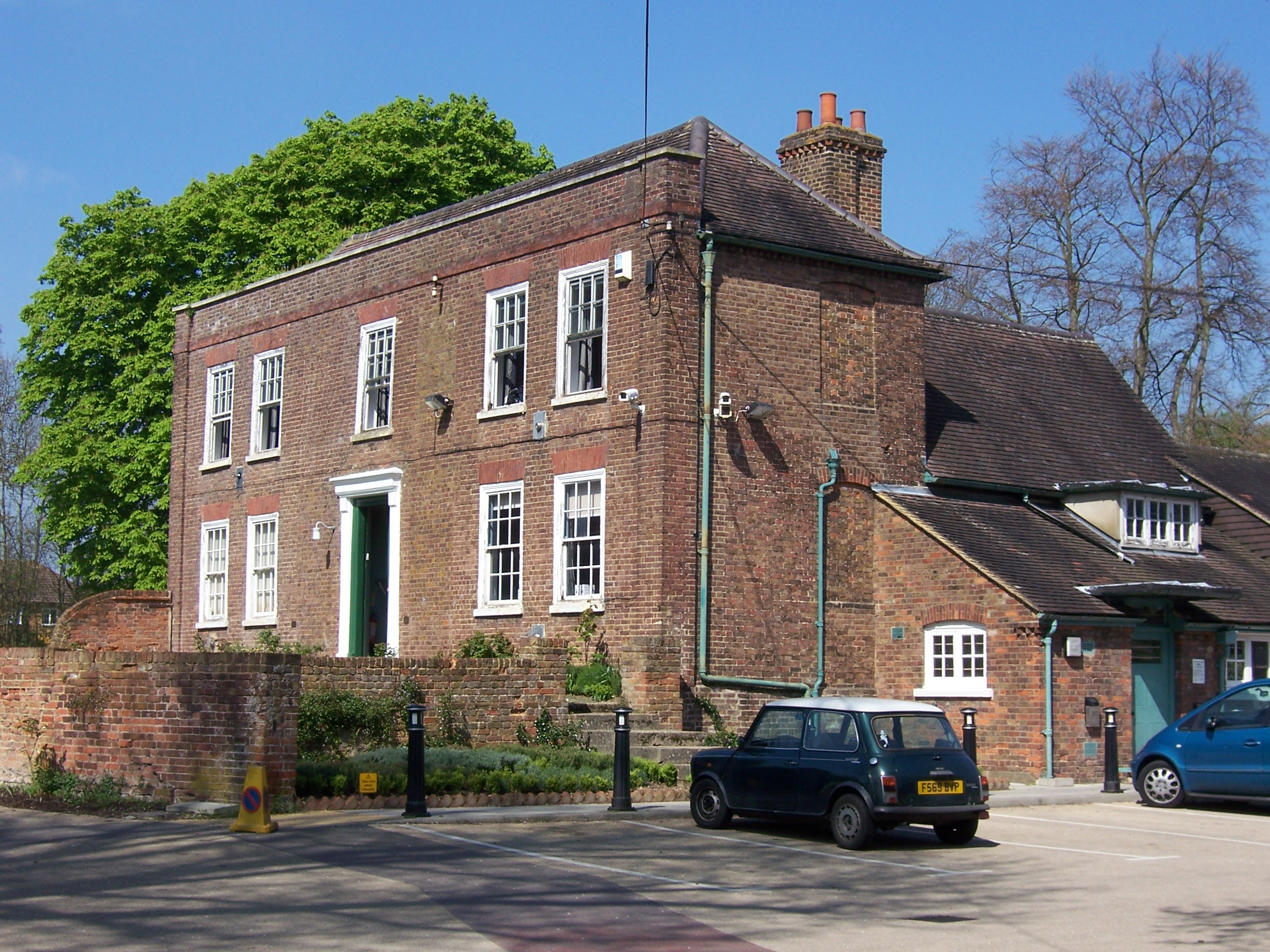
Ickenham Hall

Ickenham Hall is a Grade II Listed Georgian mansion, located in the grounds of the Compass Theatre, Glebe Avenue, Ickenham, and provides office space and hire-able rooms to local organisations.

The hall was originally the home of John Crosier and his family, who had taken ownership by 1624. Crosier referred to the house as "Sherwyns" in his will in 1769, though it was later renamed Ickenham Hall after the local Shorediche family renamed their manorial home to Manor Farm.

The Hall was the name of a GWR 4900 Class number 5944. It was cut up at Cashmore Newport in April 1963.

Middlesex County Council converted the house into a youth centre in 1948. The Compass Theatre was later built beside the hall in 1968. A connection between the theatre and Ickenham Hall was later built between 1974 and 1976.
