= Vyners School =

Coordinates: 51.5585°N 0.4618°W

Location
- Warren Road; Ickenham, London Borough of Hillingdon, UB10 8AB; England

Information
- Type: Academy
- Established: 12 January 1960
- Department for Education URN: 137635 Tables
- Ofsted: Reports
- Headteacher: Gary Mullings
- Gender: Mixed
- Age: 11 to 18
- Colours: Green and red
- Website: http://www.vynersschool.org.uk

Vyners School is a secondary school and sixth form in Ickenham within the London Borough of Hillingdon. Since November 2011 the school has had an academy status.

The headteacher is Gary Mullings.

== History ==
The school was named after Sir Robert Vyner, a former Lord Mayor of London and goldsmith-banker who made the second St. Edward's Crown. He lived at the nearby Swakeleys House for a time,.

Vyners School opened as a grammar school on 12 January 1960, under Headmaster Trevor Jaggar. He was - briefly - succeeded by Mr. R.B. Fox as temporary Head about 1967. A permanent Head was soon appointed - Mr. D.C. Best. The school later became a comprehensive. Delays in building work meant the first intake of pupils had been taught at St Mary's Grammar School in Northwood Hills and Eliots Green Grammar School in Northolt from 9 September 1959. The project received help from John Miles (the headmaster of Bishopshalt School at the time), and one of the houses is now named after him.

Vyners School became a Grant Maintained Secondary School in the 1990s under the headship of Brian Houghton.

The previous Head Teacher was James Heale, who was in his post from 2012 - 2018.

The current Head Teacher is Gary Mullings, who has been in his post from 2018–Present

== Sport ==
Sporting successes in the past have included successive English Schools Senior Netball Championships – 1970 and 1971; a British Athletics International, Mark Naylor, who held the British National Record in the high jump and competed in the Moscow and Los Angeles Olympic Games, a British Youth Shot Put champion [1970], trained by 'Pete' Ferguson, who also taught Latin and English Literature, and married an Art teacher at the school, Miss Woodmansey; as well as numerous Borough and County Championships, team and individual, plus Borough and County representatives at football, netball, athletics, rugby union, and other sports.

Over a few months of the 2017–18 terms, work had started on a new artificial turf sports field, which caused the whole of the former field to be closed. It was officially opened by Olympic gold medalist, Helen Richardson-Walsh on 10 July 2018, naming the field after former head teacher Mr James Heale, who left Vyners the next week on 20 July.

== Vyners Swing Band ==
The Vyners Swing Band was set up in 1968 by history teacher Perry Parsons MBE to give some students at Vyners School the opportunity to enjoy and perform jazz while increasing their self-confidence. The plan was to bring together about ten musicians with a varied competence in music to play some Jazz, Dixieland or Glenn Miller style arrangements and very quickly the band increased in size to around twenty five players.

The first 'performance' took place at the annual House Music Festival in March 1988, and the band has since gone from strength to strength. Large and small ensembles from the VSB have played more than 325 gigs since 1988 and raised in excess of £50,000 for a variety of charities, as well as entertaining audiences both local and further afield including successful tours of France, Italy, Switzerland and Germany.

Roy Castle joined the band for a one-off concert in 1991 to raise money for the Chiltern and Hillingdon Cheshire Homes charity.

== Notable former pupils ==
- Julia Bleasdale, athlete
- Lindsey German, activist
- Mark Naylor, athlete
- Andy Reay, rugby player

=== Vyners Grammar School ===
- Sue Cook, TV presenter
- Lorraine Heggessey, TV producer
- Sally Mapstone, academic
