= Andy Reay =

English rugby union player

- Born: 1 April 1983 (age 43) Hillingdon, England
- Height: 1.83 m (6 ft 0 in)
- Weight: 93 kg (14 st 9 lb)
- School: Vyners School
- University: Brunel University

Rugby union career
- Position: Centre
Senior career
| Years | Team | Apps | (Points) |
| 2002–2005 | Harlequins | | |
| 2005–2007 | Bristol | 5 | (5) |
| 2007–2008 | Newbury | | |
| 2008– | Moseley | | |
International career
| Years | Team | Apps | (Points) |
| | England U21 | 9 | |

Andy Reay (born 1 April 1983 in Hillingdon) is an English rugby union player for Moseley in the Aviva Championship. A centre, Reay was part of the England Under-21 team which claimed the Under 21 Six Nations Championship Grand Slam in 2004 and he also competed in the Under 21 Rugby World Championships that took place in Scotland during June 2004. He has won nine caps for the England U21 team and can play equally well at Inside centre and Outside centre.

Reay is 6' and weighs 93 kg. He was educated at Vyners School, from where he went on to read Sports Science at Brunel University.

As a boy he was introduced to Ruislip Rugby Club by his father, a former back row forward for the Borderers, a team in Harefield. His first senior club was Harlequins, prior to moving to Bristol who loaned him to Moseley in the 2005–06 season, where he made eleven appearances, scoring two tries. Reay was loaned to Moseley for a second time, towards the end of the 2006–07 season, from the February onwards. Reay also was a member of Newbury.
