= Ickenham =

Area of Greater London, England

Coordinates: 51.5580°N 0.4484°W

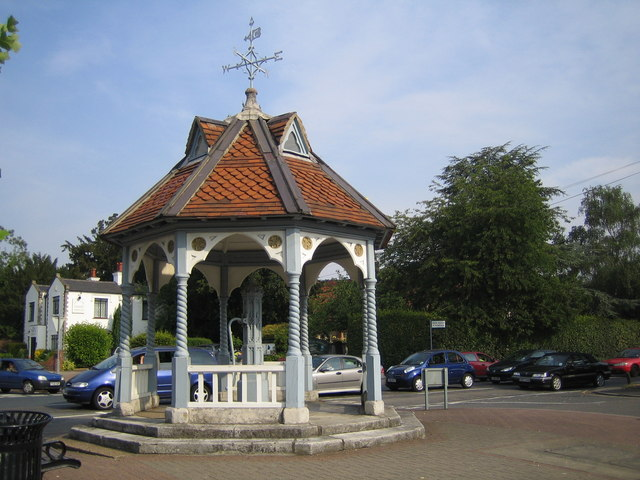
- Ickenham Village Pump

- Location within Greater London
- Population: 10,387 (2011)
- OS grid reference: TQ075855
  - Charing Cross: 14.3 mi (23.0 km) ESE
- London borough: Hillingdon
- Ceremonial county: Greater London
- Region: London
- Country: England
- Sovereign state: United Kingdom
- Post town: UXBRIDGE
- Postcode district: UB10
- Dialling code: 01895
- Police: Metropolitan
- Fire: London
- Ambulance: London
- UK Parliament: Ruislip, Northwood and Pinner
- London Assembly: Ealing and Hillingdon

Ickenham is an area in Greater London, forming the northern part of Uxbridge and within the London Borough of Hillingdon.

While no major historical events have taken place in Ickenham, settlements dating back to the Roman occupation of Britain have been discovered during archaeological surveys, and the area appears in the Domesday Book. Buildings from the 14th, 15th and 16th centuries remain standing and have been restored in recent years.

The village was originally split into four manors, but later there were two: Ickenham and Swakeleys. The old manorial home of Swakeleys, a 17th-century Jacobean mansion Swakeleys House still stands, and much of the Swakeleys estate was sold for housing in the 1920s. Ickenham's manorial home, Manor Farm, now forms part of Long Lane Farm. A military station, RAF West Ruislip, was opened in 1917. Its final use was for the Navy Exchange of the U.S. Naval Activities, United Kingdom command between 1975 and 2006.

At the 1901 census, Ickenham had a population of 329; at the 2001 census the population had reached 9,933, although census figures show a marked population decline during the 1960s and 1970s. By the 2011 census, the population had reached 10,387. When Ickenham obtained a railway station on the Metropolitan Railway's line between Harrow and Uxbridge, a great deal of residential development started in the village, and it gradually became part of the London commuter belt. Ickenham expanded with the sale and development of much of the Swakeleys estate in 1922 and became part of what was later termed "Metro-land".

== History ==
=== Toponymy ===
The name 'Ickenham' means 'homestead/village of Tic(c)a'. The T was lost in the 13th-14th centuries because of confusion with the Middle English word for 'at'.

Ickenham appears in the Domesday Book of 1086 three times under the name "Ticheham". Translated from Latin, the second entry reads:

Manor Ickenham answers for 9½ hides.^{[a]} 3 men-at-arms and 1 Englishman hold it from Earl Roger. Land for 6 ploughs; 4 ploughs there; a further 2 possible. 6 villagers with 1 hide; 2 others with 1 hide and 1 virgate;^{[b]} 2 others with 2 virgates; 4 smallholders with 20 acres; 3 cottages. Meadow for 4 ploughs; pasture for the village livestock; woodland, 200 pigs. Total value £4; when acquired the same; before 1066 £6.

The Domesday Book describes the land as being predominantly flat and composed of London clay with the exception of alluvium along the banks of the River Pinn. Of the few archaeological surveys of Ickenham carried out, one in 1994 by the Museum of London found a system of Roman fields dating back to the 1st and 2nd centuries, along with pottery fragments. Research suggest that the area may have been abandoned for a period following the departure of the Romans from Britain around AD 410.

=== Early developments ===
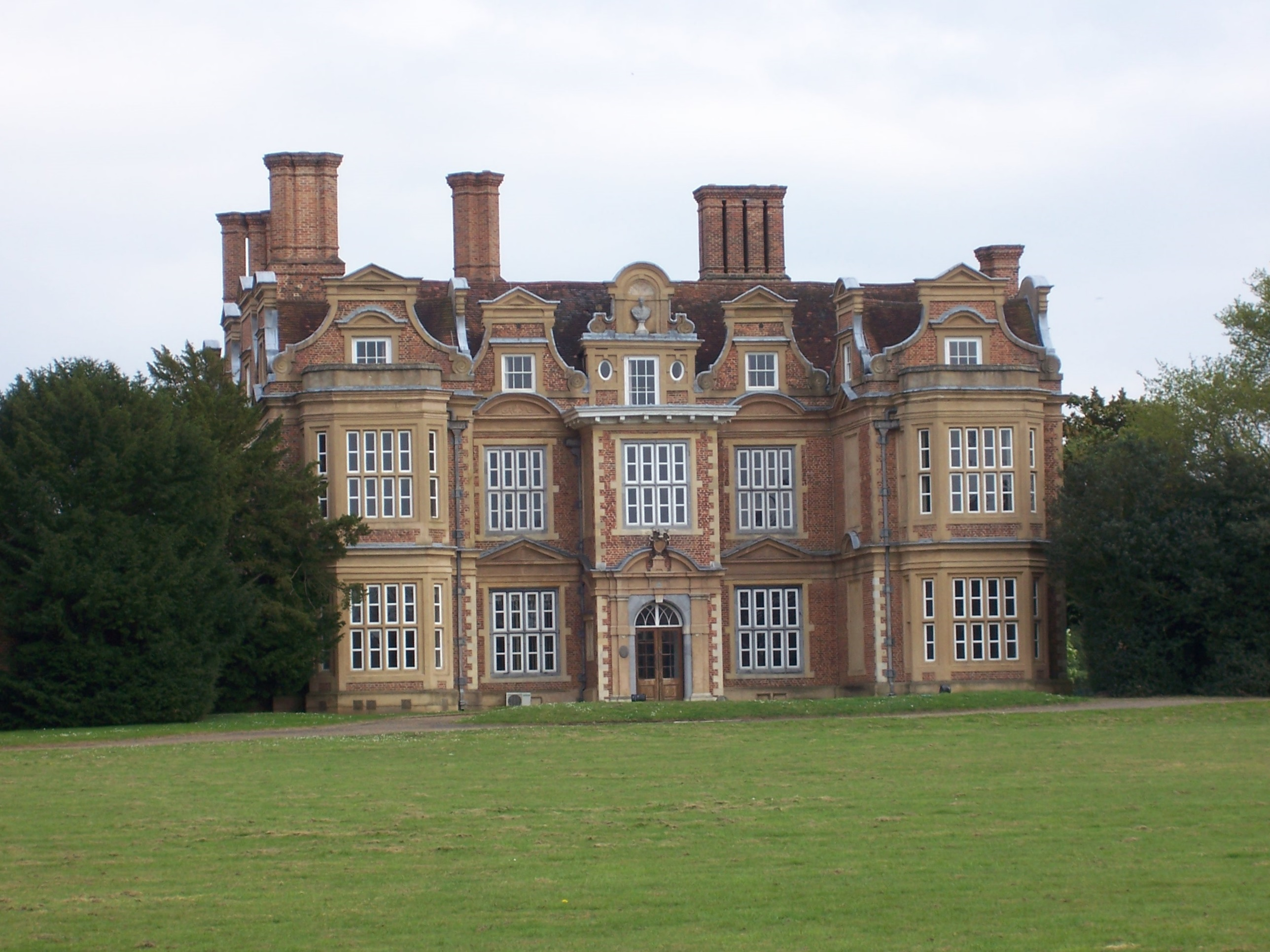
Swakeleys House was built in 1638.

Ickenham was originally divided into the four manors of Ickenham, Tykenham, Swalcliff (Swakeleys) and Herses (Hercies). Tykenham and Herses were within the parish of Hillingdon, though Herses subsequently became part of the manor of Swalcliff. These manors were eventually merged to form the main manors of Ickenham and Swakeleys. The original lord of the manor of Ickenham was Geoffrey de Mandeville, from whom it passed to William de Brock and then, in 1334, to John Charlton whose son John owned Swakeleys from 1350. By the mid-14th century, Ickenham was owned by the Shorediche family who retained possession until 1819.

The Crosier family, major landowners in north-west Middlesex, moved to Ickenham in the 16th century. They established their manorial home as Sherwyns, and owned Home Farm and Sears house in 1624. After the Shorediche family Milton Farm was bought by William Crosier in 1685. Edward Hilliard become the direct descendant of the final member of the Crosier family, John Crosier. Under the Hilliards, Milton Farm was sold to become part of the Swakeleys estate in 1816, and Hill Farm become Northolt Aerodrome in 1916. The Shorediche family built their manor house on a track off Long Lane. Originally called Ickenham Hall, it was let out to farmers in 1818 and renamed Manor Farm, at which point the Crosier family renamed their manorial home from Sherwyns to Ickenham Hall.

Swakeleys manor, subordinate to Ickenham, was named after Robert Swalcliffe, who owned the manor with his wife Joan in the 14th century. He appears in records as Robert de Swalclyve and Robert de Wykeham, reflecting his ownership of Swakeleys and Wickham Park in Oxfordshire. In 1347, he owed £40 to a money lender, Roger Rikeman, which he was unable to pay, and so his land in Ickenham was passed by Rikeman in 1350 to John de Charlton.

A descendant of John de Charlton, the first Sir Thomas de Charlton, died in 1448 whereupon Swakeleys passed to his son, also named Sir Thomas, who became Speaker of the House of Commons and member of parliament (MP) for Middlesex. He died in 1465, at which point his son Sir Richard became owner of the manor. Sir Richard was killed fighting on the side of Richard III during the Battle of Bosworth Field in 1485. The victor of the battle, Henry VII, named him in his Act of Attainder, though he granted Sir Richard's wife Elizabeth a life interest in the manor. However, Sir Thomas Bourchier was subsequently granted the manor of Swakeleys and Covelhall (Cowley). Upon Sir Thomas' death in 1510, the manor passed to Sir John Peeche as his executor. Sir John had no children, so Swakeleys passed to the Earl of Devon, Henry Courteney in 1521. The Earl granted a licence to control Swakeleys to Sir William Fitzwilliam in 1531, who was acting as trustee for Ralph Pexall.

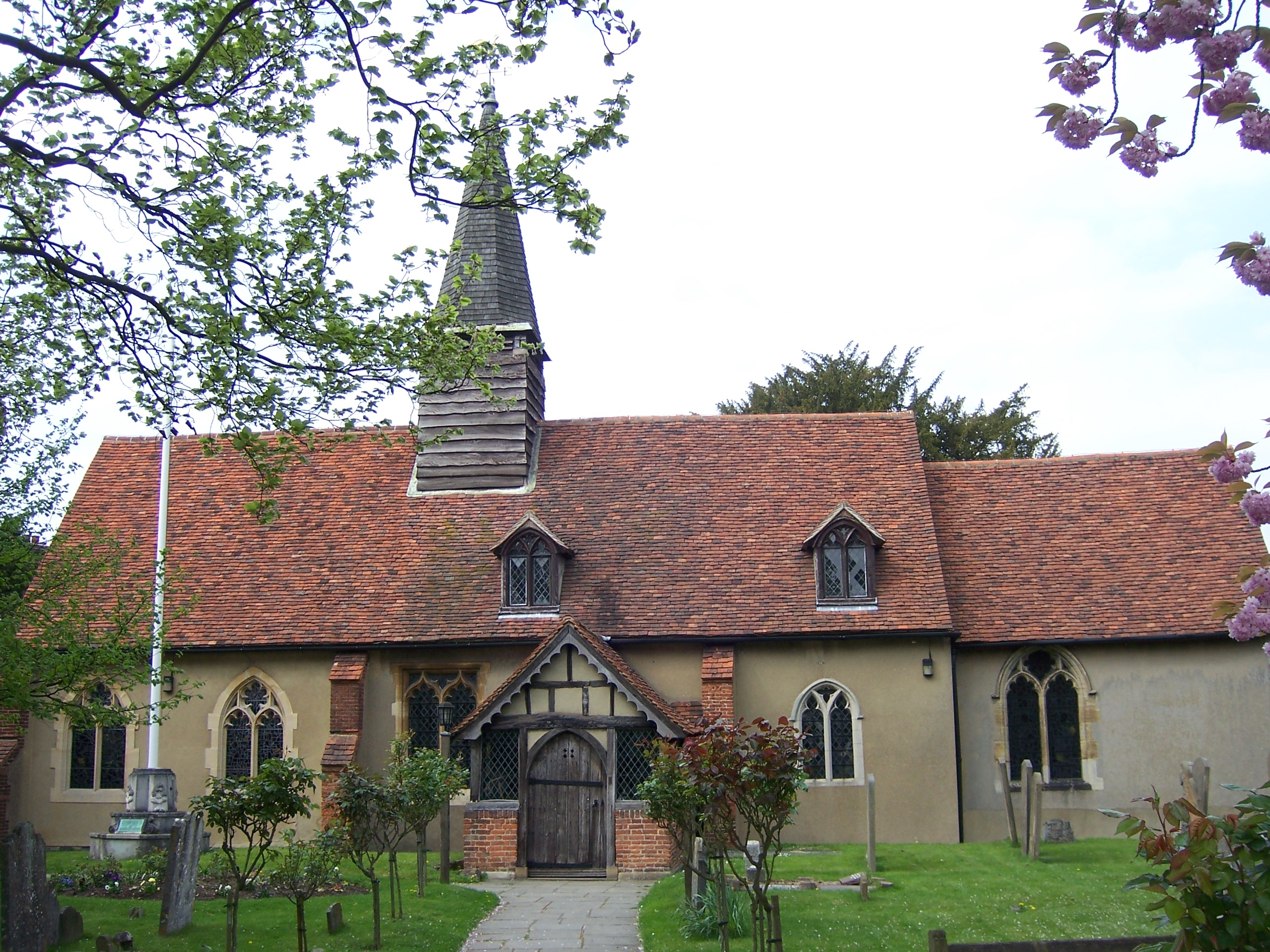
St Giles' church dates back to 1335.

The lords of the manor of Swakeleys resided at Swakeleys House, though the house that stands today was not the first on the site. The original dated to around the 14th century and was probably constructed of wattle and timber. It was subject to extensive remedial work, much lamented at the time, while under the ownership of John Bingley. Bingley later sold the estate to Sir Edmund Wright, a future Lord Mayor of London, in 1629, and the current house was built of brick in 1638.

A church in Ickenham is not mentioned in the Domesday Book and it is likely that residents travelled to nearby Harefield for services. The original nave and chancel of St Giles' Church have been dated to 1335 while the nave was extended west in 1959. The bell turret was built in the 15th century and a brick aisle added in 1575.

'The Pump' is a significant local landmark. Donated to the village by Charlotte Gell, this water pump stands close to the village pond at the intersection of Swakeleys Road and Long Lane. After Gell's death in 1863, under the provisions of her will a water pump was sunk for the benefit for the community in 1866. The village pond next to the pump was dug at the same time as the 144-foot (44 m) well for the pump was sunk, to accommodate waste from the construction. An older pond on the other side of the village was filled in with the excavated earth from the new one. In 1857 Gell had also donated some of her land near St Giles's Church for five almshouses to be built for longstanding servants of the Gell household or Ickenham residents who were members of the Church of England. No more than three people were allowed to live in the houses at one time. The cottages remain and are maintained by the St Giles' Church. Next to the pump stands the Coach & Horses public house, first licensed for the sale of alcohol in 1759 but of 16th-century origin. The house was used for manorial courts throughout the 19th century until the last was held in 1878.

=== Urban development ===
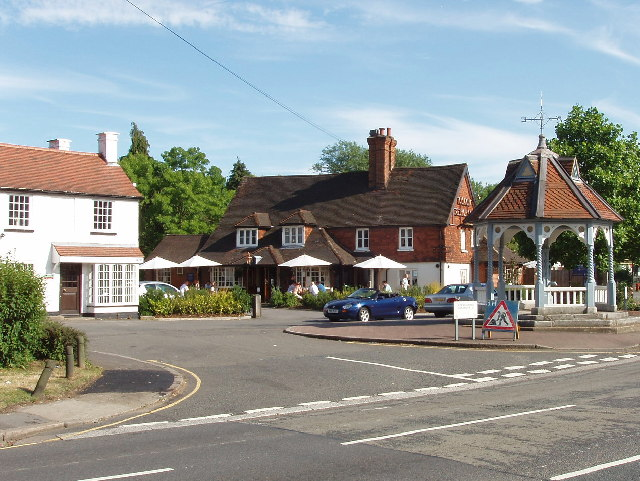
The Coach and Horses public house and the Pump

On 25 September 1905, following lobbying by Ickenham Parish Council, the Metropolitan Railway opened a small halt on their line between Harrow and Uxbridge. The railway company had been reluctant to open a station in the area due to a perceived lack of demand, and so a compromise was reached with the construction of the halt. The new stop brought with it travellers from London seeking a day out in rural surroundings. Nearby villagers sold flowers from their gardens and served teas to the visitors. The parish council later requested shelters for passengers on the platforms, which were built in December 1905, followed by a booking hut in 1910. The original platforms, too short to align with all train carriages, were extended in 1922. Ickenham Halt was rebuilt as a station in the 1970s.

The marathon event of the 1908 Summer Olympics in London passed through Ickenham and Uxbridge on its way to the White City Stadium.

As a result of the railway, more commuters gradually moved to Ickenham and travelled to work in London. On 5 July 1922, 1,382 acres (559 ha) of the Swakeleys estate was auctioned for development, thereby significantly reducing its size. Roads laid out for the new development were Warren Road, Swakeleys Drive, Court Road, Milton Road, Ivy House Road, The Avenue and Thornhill Road (originally named Park Road). Other land bordering the River Pinn was designated as public open land. Shops were built around Swakeleys Road, while houses were constructed along its length. The road was widened to become a dual carriageway in 1937. Milton Farm, one of the farms on the former Swakeleys estate was demolished in 1939. The farm's pond and listed barn were cleared to make way for housing in what became Milton Road and Milton Court, though marketed as "Ickenham Garden City".

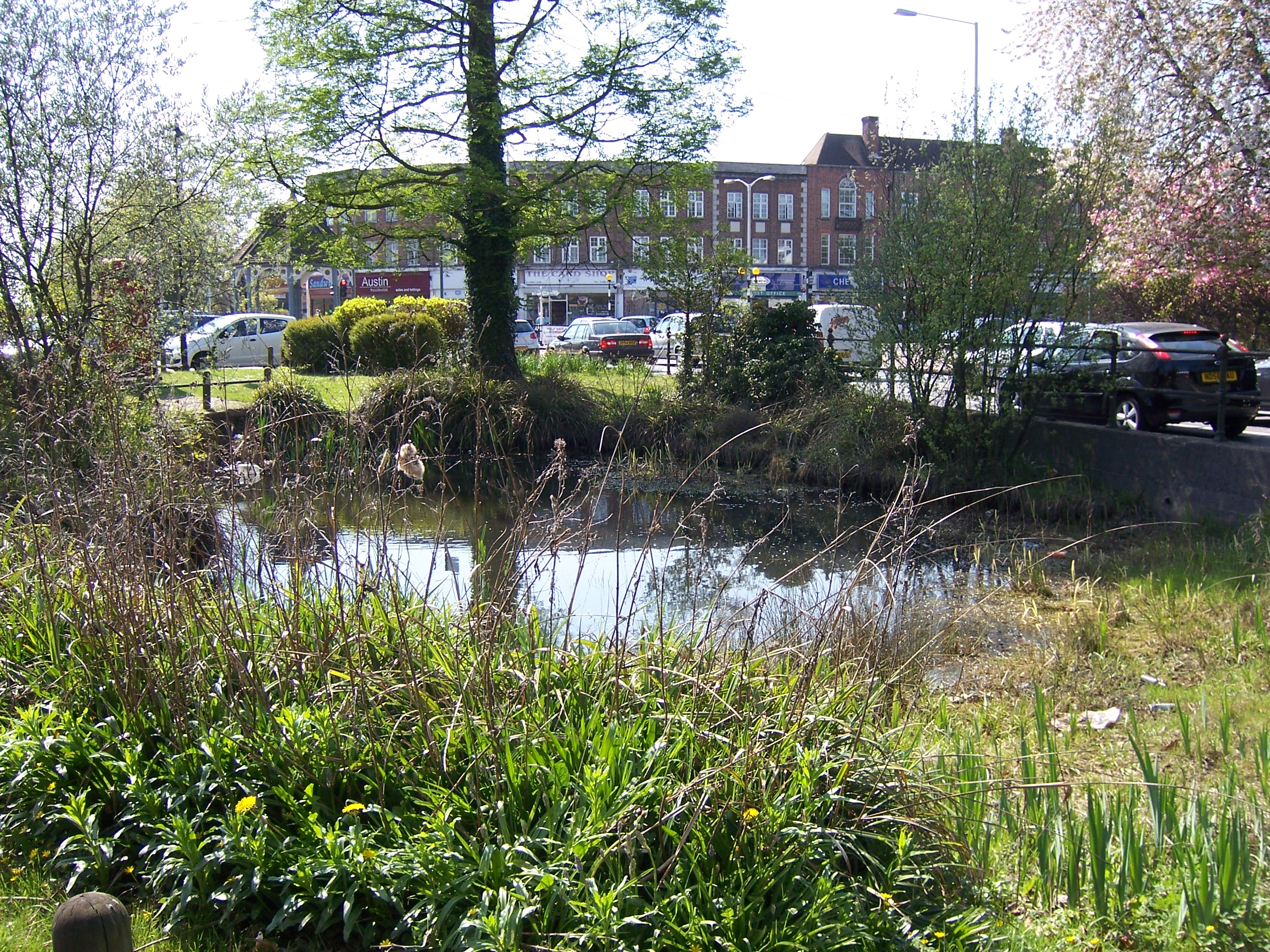
View of Ickenham village pond

A military station, operated by the Royal Air Force and later the United States Navy, was opened on part of Home Farm close to the parish boundary with Ruislip in 1917, later becoming known as RAF West Ruislip. The site was used originally for the British No. 4 Maintenance Unit, together with the RAF Records division. It became involved in the repair of aircraft equipment and later in the servicing of American vehicles from RAF South Ruislip. Between 1955 and 1975 the United States Air Force was based at the Ruislip station, before the U.S. Naval Activities, United Kingdom command leased the site from the Ministry of Defence for the American Naval Exchange.

The original village school was built on Ickenham High Road in 1866, although by 1920 it had become overcrowded. Older children were moved to the village hall in 1928 under the name Ickenham Temporary Council School. In 1929 the village school closed and its infant pupils also moved to the village hall. The road was widened in 1934 necessitating demolition of the school building along with the original Fox & Geese public house.

St Giles' church and the Pump, c. 1900

The village pump remained in use until December 1914, while the handle was removed in 1921 by the local council for safe keeping but was never returned. The pump was restored in 2004 in partnership with a local building company, and a similar handle was fitted during the works.

Breakspear Primary School was built in 1937, followed by Glebe Primary in 1952 on the other side of the railway line. The Roman Catholic secondary school Douay Martyrs was built in 1962 and later expanded onto the former site of Swakeleys School nearby. Swakeleys School had opened in 1929 for older children from the village school. In 1952 the boys moved to the newly opened Abbotsfield School and Swakeleys became a girls' secondary modern school. The girls' school moved from Ickenham to share the site of Abbotsfield School for Boys in Hillingdon in 1973. Vyners School opened as a grammar school on 12 January 1960 and later became a comprehensive. Delays in building work meant the first intake of pupils were taught at St Mary's Grammar School in Northwood Hills from 9 September 1959.

The village hall, designed by Clifton Davy, was built on part of Church Farm in 1926. Opened by Princess Victoria, as well as becoming the temporary village school the hall also became a restaurant during the Second World War and went on to be used as a bank and a polling station. A police telephone box was constructed next to the Pump in February 1936, and became operational on 4 May 1936. Church Farm opposite St Giles' church was demolished after the Second World War and replaced with shops, while new roads were built in the area. By 1951 the population of Ickenham had reached 7,107, and this had risen to 10,370 by 1961 and 11,214 by 1971. The ford over the River Pinn on Swakeleys Drive, nicknamed "The Splash", was replaced in 1957 by a road bridge.

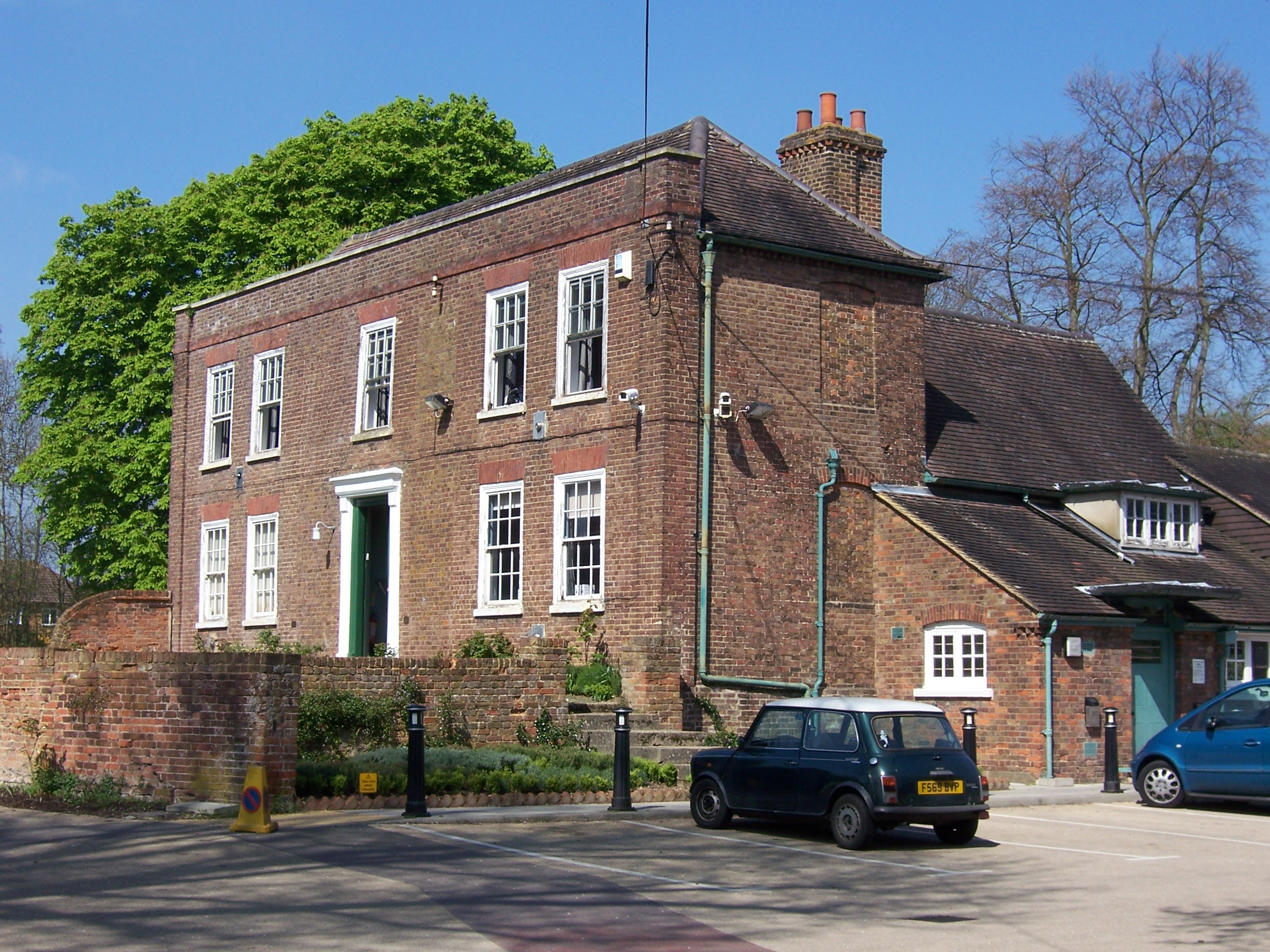
Ickenham Hall was joined to the Compass Theatre in 1976.

Middlesex County Council bought Ickenham Hall and its grounds in 1948 in order to convert it into a youth centre. In 1968 a theatre was built behind the hall, later named the Compass Theatre by the Theatre Director John Sherratt. A new building connecting the two was built in 1976.

During the Second World War Swakeleys House was requisitioned by the military and a searchlight battery established in the grounds. The house was Grade I listed in 1956, and the head gardener's cottage on the junction of Swakeleys Road and The Avenue was Grade II listed in 1959.

The village library opened in 1962 on the site of the 16th century cottage and tea garden, The Orchard. Uxbridge Borough Council installed a three-sided clock commemorating the 1953 coronation of Elizabeth II in the library's tower, having been persuaded not to add it to the eight-sided village pump. The local library was closed for a complete refurbishment in 2009 and reopened in March 2010.

In the 1980s, St Giles' church celebrated its 650th anniversary and formed a covenant with the neighbouring United Reformed Church. The United Reformed Church moved to its current building in 1936 after the previous chapel building proved too small for the growing congregation. It was then used by a local company as a wood and scrap metal yard. Nearby, many buildings on the RAF station were demolished to make way for a new housing estate named Brackenbury Village. The US Navy eventually left in 2006 and the base was permanently closed. The site was cleared in 2007 and is currently undergoing redevelopment as residential housing under the "Ickenham Park" name.

A garden commemorating the Diamond Jubilee of Elizabeth II was opened in September 2012 in Swakeleys Park. The garden, featuring a landscaped area and benches around a stone obelisk, was designed by the local council's Green Spaces Team. The opening had been scheduled for 26 May 2012, although this was postponed after vandals destroyed the stone obelisk overnight shortly after it had been installed.

== Political representation ==
Ickenham had a parish council but came within the Uxbridge Rural District until 1925, when this was absorbed into the Municipal Borough of Uxbridge. On 1 April 1938 the civil parish was abolished and merged with Uxbridge. At the 1931 census (the last before the abolition of the parish), Ickenham had a population of 1741. In 1965 the borough was included in the newly established London Borough of Hillingdon. Within the borough of Hillingdon, all of Ickenham fell within the Ickenham ward, until 1999 when parts of the village were moved into adjoining wards to balance ward populations. Following further ward boundary changes in 2022, Ickenham currently falls within the Ickenham and South Harefield ward, with Conservative councillors Kaushik Banerjee, Martin Goddard and Eddie Lavery representing it.

Ickenham was within the Uxbridge constituency until boundary changes at the 2010 general election meant it became part of the new Ruislip, Northwood and Pinner constituency. As of 2025, it is represented by David Simmonds.

== Demography ==
72% of the population is White British, according to the 2011 census. The next largest groups are Indians (10.9%) and Other Whites (3.6%).

81.2% of people living in Ickenham were born in England. Other common places of birth include India (3%), Ireland (1.6%), and Kenya (1.3%).

The most common religious affiliations in Ickenham are Christians (60%), those of no religion (17.9%), Hindus (5.8%) and Sikhs (4.3%).

Almost half the housing stock, 45.3%, are detached houses. 40.3% are semi-detached, 9.4% flats/maisonettes/apartments, and 5% terraced.

== Education ==
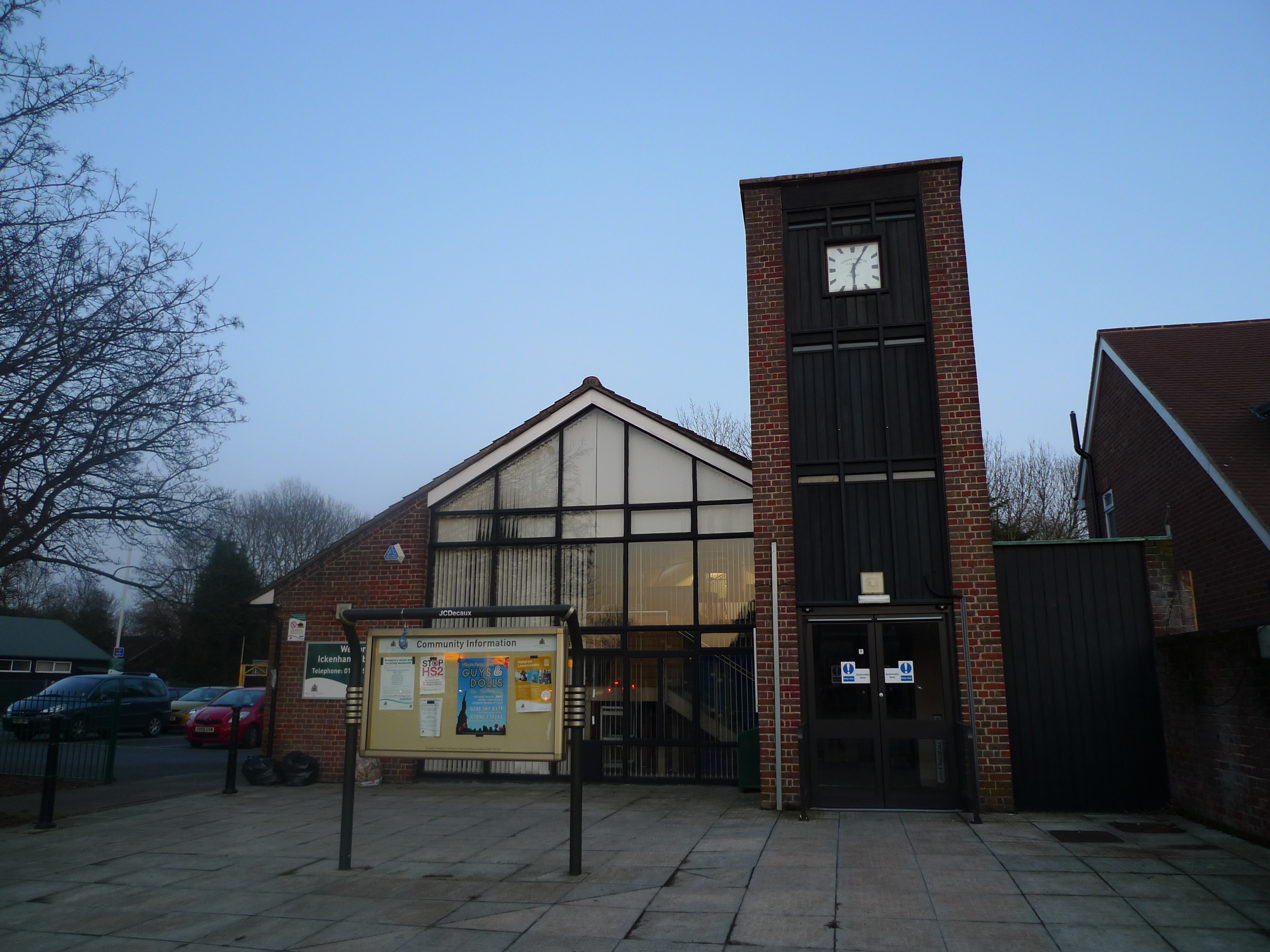
The refurbished library, pictured in March 2012

Primary schools in Ickenham include Breakspear School, Breakspear Junior School, and Glebe Primary School. Secondary schools include The Douay Martyrs School and Vyners School. There is also Pentland Field School – a new special school on the former USA Navy site in Ickenham. This is for young people aged between 4 and 19 years old who have severe to moderate learning difficulties.

== Sports clubs and societies ==
Sports clubs in Ickenham include Ickenham Cricket Club and Ickenham Rugby Club. Hillingdon Athletics Club (an amalgamation of the Ruislip-Northwood and Uxbridge clubs), has attracted many athletes from Ickenham since its foundation in the 1960s.

The Ickenham and District Society of Model Engineers was formed in September 1948 and originally met in the old ARP huts, before moving to Ickenham Hall. On 14 May 1949, the society held their first exhibition of miniature locomotives in a field off Swakeleys Road. A new society clubhouse opened on 18 June 1955 on a site near the Coach & Horses public house where it remains. The miniature railway is open to the public on the first Saturday of each month.

Ickenham's residents' association was established in 1924, and it plays an active role within the community; in recent years the association has been involved in preventing developments by Tesco and IKEA, which in the association's view would have adversely affected the town.

== Transport ==
Ickenham tube station is served by the Metropolitan and Piccadilly lines.

West Ruislip station (opened as Ruislip & Ickenham) is on the border of Ruislip and Ickenham and is served by the Central line and Chiltern Main Line.

The London Buses routes U1, U10 and 278 serve Ickenham.

B467 (Swakeleys Road) and B466 (Long Lane) intersect in the centre of Ickenham. They link the Ickenham area with Harefield, Hillingdon and Ruislip.

== Landmarks and events ==
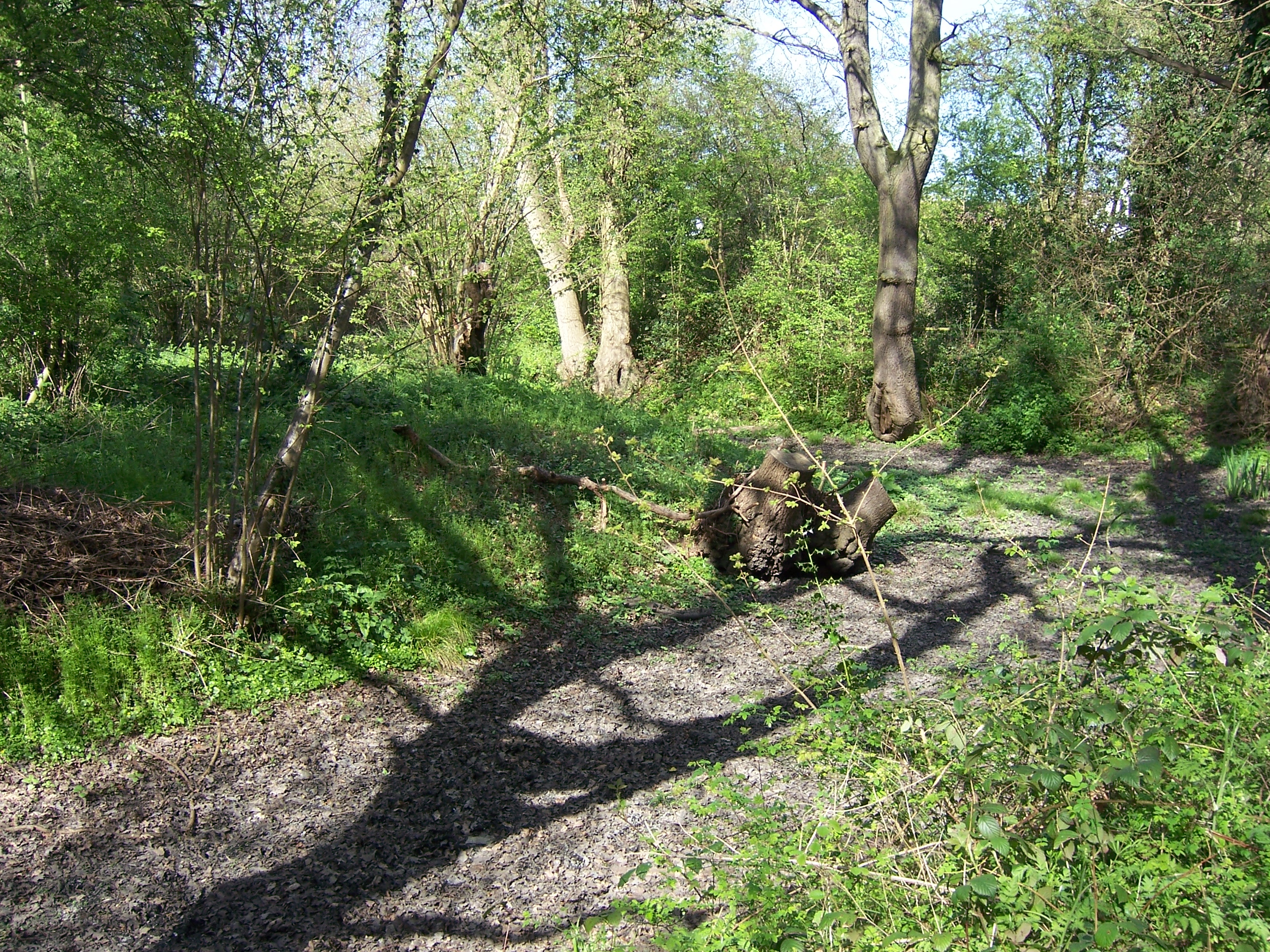
Part of the Pynchester Moat

=== Pynchester Moat ===
The Pynchester Moat is a Scheduled Ancient Monument on the River Pinn just east of Copthall Road West. Although usually dry in the summer months, the moat surrounding the location of a manor house can still be seen. Excavations of the site between 1966 and 1969 found pottery and an oven dating back to the 14th or 15th century. It is believed the manor house at the centre of the moat was "Pynchester", a building owned by the Hastings family in the 16th century.

The moat is a point of interest on the Celandine Route, a 12-mile (19 km) walk along the River Pinn from Pinner to the Grand Union Canal at Cowley.

=== Swakeleys House ===
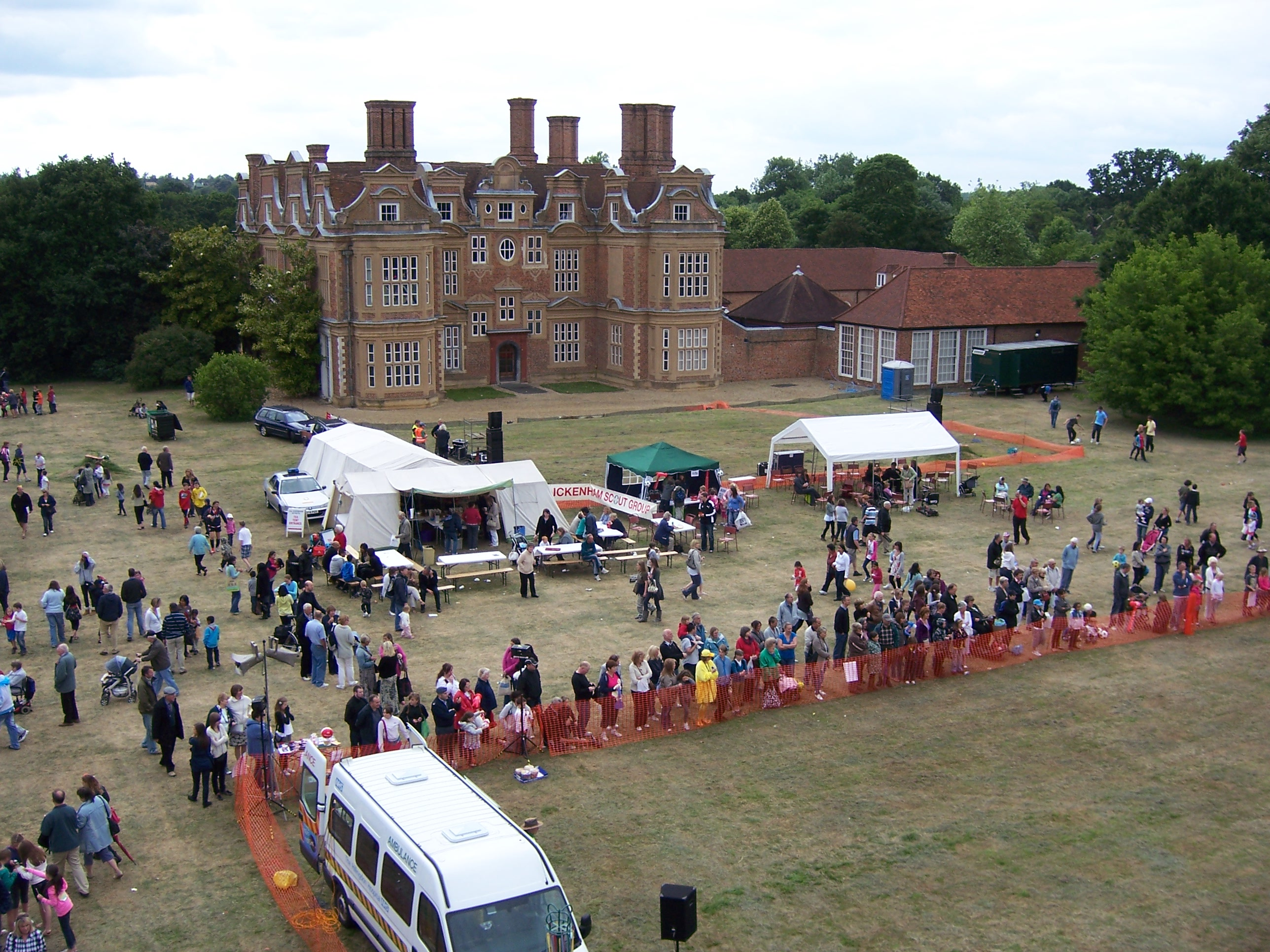
The 2010 Ickenham Festival within the grounds of Swakeleys House

Built between 1629 and 1638 for Sir Edmund Wright, the house replaced an existing structure dating back to the 14th century. In later years the Foreign & Commonwealth Office Sports Association bought the house, followed by the London Postal Region Sports Club. Cricket matches between the club and local teams from Ickenham and Uxbridge were played within the grounds. The house was bought by three local residents in the 1980s and restored, whereupon it was leased to Bristol Myers Squibb for 25 years. Since the expiry of the lease in 2009, the house has been open to the public for one day a year as part of Open House London.

=== Ickenham Festival ===
The biennial Ickenham Festival has taken place in the town since 1976, originally with the aim of highlighting the variety of societies and groups in the area. The festival normally centres on a charity gala day in June, when various groups including Scouts, church groups and schools parade through the town, finishing with a large fête in the grounds of Swakeleys House. Fireworks mark the end of the festival in the evening. The festival Gala moved to the grounds of Vyners School in 2014 after a dispute with the owner of Swakeleys House.

== Notable people ==
- Roger Crab (1621-1680), English soldier, haberdasher, herbal doctor and writer best known for his ascetic lifestyle and Christian vegetarianism, lived as a hermit in Ickenham between 1652 and 1657.
- Steve Conway (1920–1952), singer, latterly lived in Ickenham.
- Cellist Florence Hooton (1912-1988) lived at 34 Thornhill Road, Ickenham, with her violinist husband David Martin (1911-1982).
- Anna Rose O'Sullivan (born 1994), ballerina and principal dancer with The Royal Ballet, was raised in Ickenham.
