= Compass Theatre =

Theatre in London, England

Coordinates: 51.5621°N 0.4405°W

- Compass Arts Theatre, Compass Theatre and Arts Centre
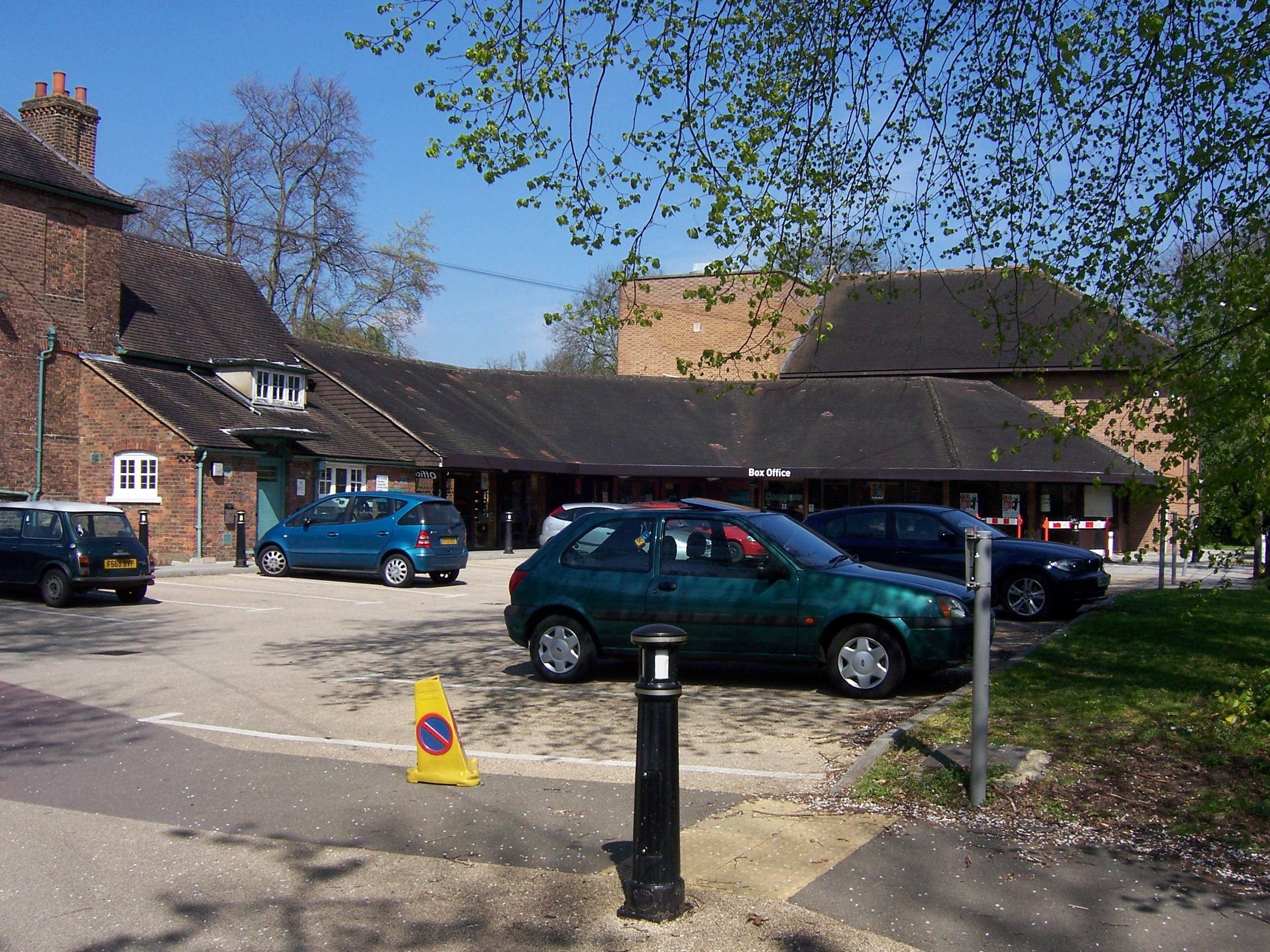
- The Compass Theatre
- Interactive map of Compass Theatre
- Address: Glebe Avenue; Ickenham, London; United Kingdom
- Owner: London Borough of Hillingdon
- Capacity: 158
- Type: Provincial
- Public transit: Ickenham

Construction
- Opened: 1968
- Rebuilt: 1980s

Website
- hillingdontheatres.uk

The Compass Theatre is a 158-seat theatre in Ickenham owned by the London Borough of Hillingdon.

Middlesex County Council bought Ickenham Hall and its grounds in 1948 in order to convert it into a youth centre. In 1968 a theatre was built behind the hall, later named the Compass Theatre by the Theatre Director John Sherratt. The two buildings were connected by a new building in 1976.

The theatre was refurbished in 1990 and reopened by Prince Edward.

The theatre predominantly receives hires by local amateur dramatic groups, as well as films, professional shows for children and other arts activities. It also hosts 360 Youth Theatre, the film company Talking Pictures and the administration of Dance Challenge.

Regularly appearing groups include Argosy Players, Ruislip Dramatic Society, Hillingdon Musical Society, Players 2, Pastiche Musical Theatre and Purple Theatre, as well as professional companies Big Wooden Horse Theatre and Tall Stories.

Until 2009, Tall Stories, producers of The Gruffalo, were a theatre company in residence.
