= Jane Lush =

British television executive

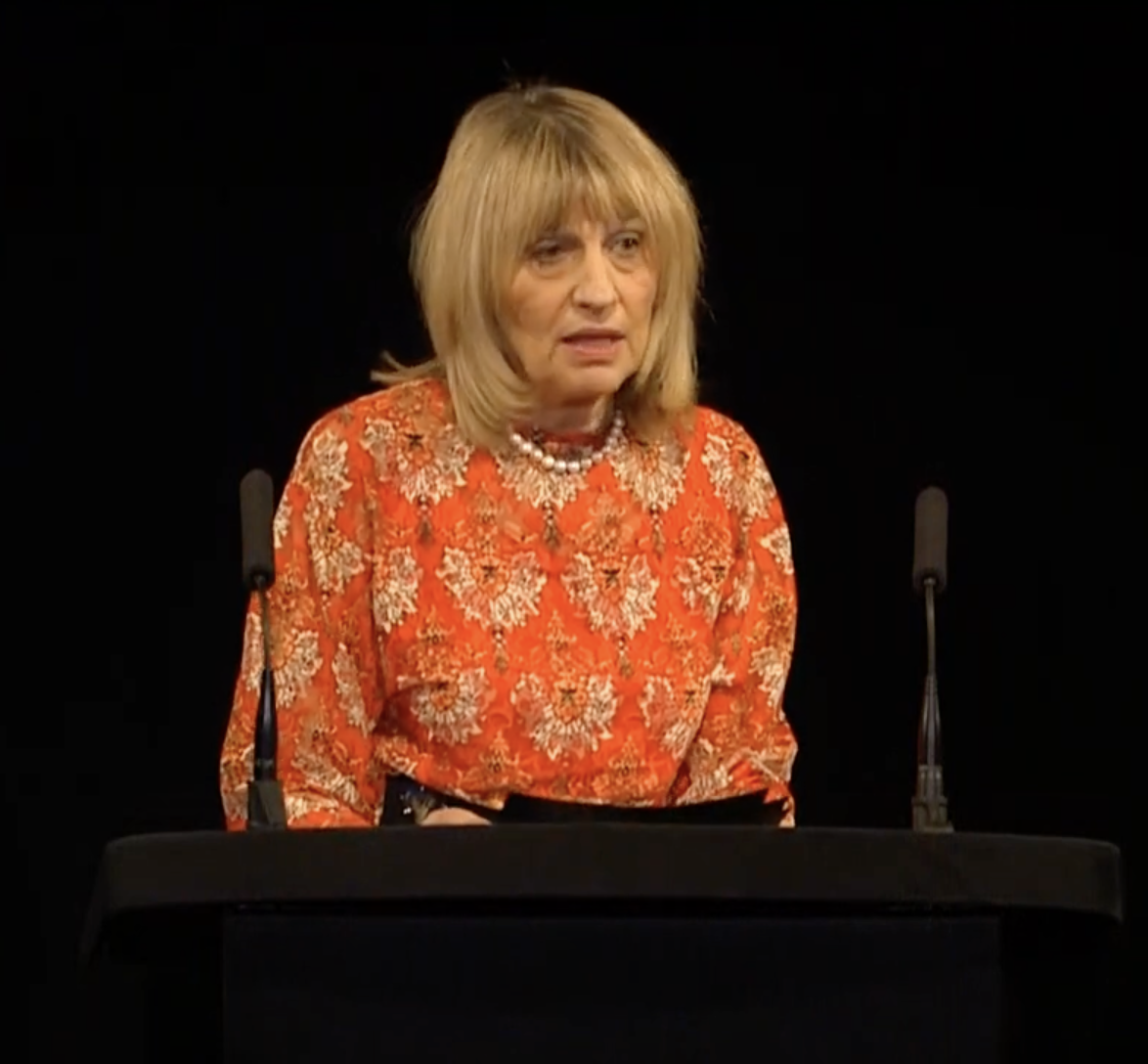
- Lush in 2018
- Born: August 10, 1952 (age 74); Marylebone, London, England
- Occupation: Chairman of BAFTA

Jane Elaine Lush (born 10 August 1952) is the Chairman of BAFTA, and a former BBC executive. She left the British Broadcasting Corporation in 2006, after a career spanning over 35 years.

== Life and career ==
Lush was born in Marylebone. She attended Camden School for Girls from 1963, then a girls' grammar school.

== BBC career ==
Lush began working for the BBC as a trainee secretary in 1970 at what is now Langham Hotel, London, but was then owned and used by the corporation. After nine years, she became a researcher. Lush told Gaby Koppel in 2018: "I think I was quite lucky in that I found myself working for women bosses at crucial times and they took me more seriously and encouraged me much more than my previously male bosses had done, to believe in myself".

After periods as a production assistant and a producer working in presentation, Lush oversaw Barry Norman's Film review programme. She produced the documentary A Film is Born: The Making of Yentl concerning the Barbra Streisand film Yentl (1983). During the 1980s, Lush took over the BBC's Holiday programme and extended its annual run.

As Controller of the BBC's Daytime programming from the autumn of 1998, Lush commissioned such shows as The Weakest Link, the soap Doctors and Bargain Hunt. She chose Anne Robinson for The Weakest Link and brought Graham Norton and Vanessa Feltz to the BBC.

=== Head of Entertainment ===
Lush was responsible for many of the BBC's entertainment shows when she became the head of the department in 2002 including The Apprentice, Dragons' Den, Fame Academy, Comic Relief Does Fame Academy, Test the Nation, Strictly Dance Fever, Just The Two of Us and Strictly Come Dancing. She was also responsible for overseeing the BBC's Comedy output including a role with Have I Got News for You since it began in 1990, and later in 2002, was the person who told Angus Deayton his contract as its host was being terminated.

In 2008, former BBC newsreader Natasha Kaplinsky told how she felt Lush and her junior managers had intimidated her into participating in the BBC's high-profile Strictly Come Dancing entertainment programme in 2003. After Kaplinsky refused to participate for 6 months, the matter was escalated to the BBC One Controller, Lorraine Heggessey and when that approach failed, Lush, Head of Entertainment took Kaplinsky aside and told her "I'm sure you're not going to be penalised for not doing it".

== Later career ==
Lush left the BBC in 2007 to start up the independent production company, Splash Media, its first output being The Underdog Show. Although she still shares links with the BBC, chairing the Fame Academy Bursary with trustees including Sir Paul McCartney.

== Personal life ==
Lush married Peter Tenenbaum in 1974 and lives in north London; the couple have a daughter (born 1981) and a son (born September 1987). She was a close personal friend of the murdered television presenter Jill Dando.

== Notes ==
Media offices
Preceded by	Chairman of BAFTA; June 2016 –	Succeeded by
Preceded by	Controller: Entertainment Commissioning (BBC); 2002–2005	Succeeded by
Preceded by	Controller: Daytime Television (BBC); 1998–2002	Succeeded by
