= Swakeleys House =

17th-century mansion in London

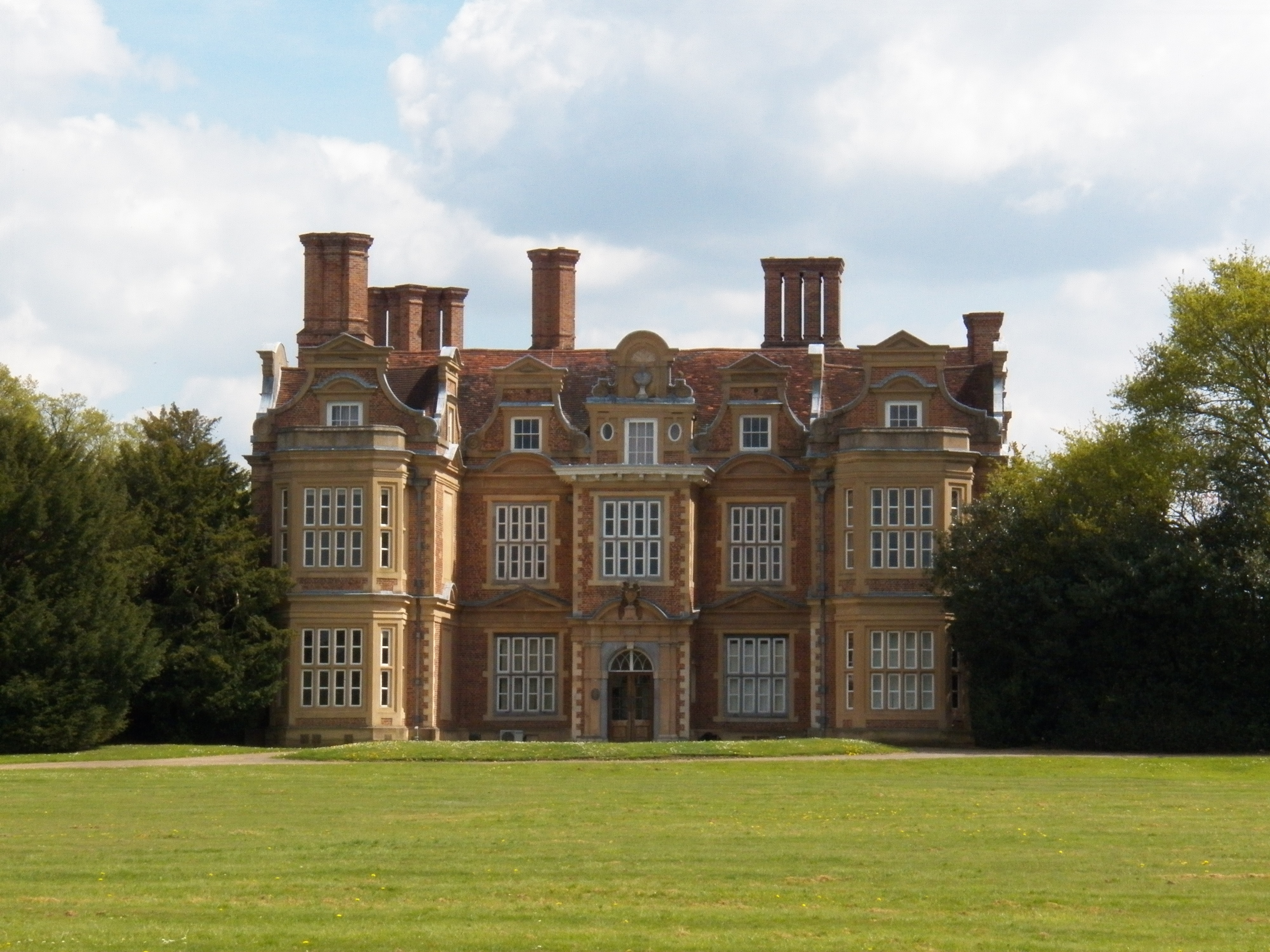
- View of the west side of Swakeleys House

- Location within Greater London

General information
- Architectural style: Artisan Mannerism
- Location: Ickenham, Greater London, England
- Coordinates: 51.56°N 0.451667°W
- Construction started: 1629
- Completed: 1638
- Client: Sir Edmund Wright

Swakeleys House is a Grade I-listed 17th-century mansion in Ickenham, London Borough of Hillingdon, England, built in 1638 for the future Lord Mayor of London, Sir Edmund Wright. The house is a leading example of the architectural style known as "Artisan Mannerism", a development of Jacobean architecture led by a group of mostly London-based craftsmen. The many decorative quasi-classical gable ends are a distinguishing mark of the style.

Originally the home of the lords of the manor of Swakeleys, the diarist Samuel Pepys visited the house twice. The property changed hands many times over the years and at one time was home to the Foreign & Commonwealth Office Sports Association. Large sections of the grounds were sold off in 1922 and developed as suburban housing.

Following a long period of decline, the house was purchased in the 1980s by a group of local residents and restored as part of its conversion to offices. It became a focal point for Ickenham during the biennial Ickenham Festival when the grounds were used to host the main gala day, until the house's new owners restricted access in 2014. Swakeleys is open in part once a year to the public as part of Open House London. Planning permission was granted in 2014 for the conversion of the house to form one large, residential property.

== History ==
=== Construction ===
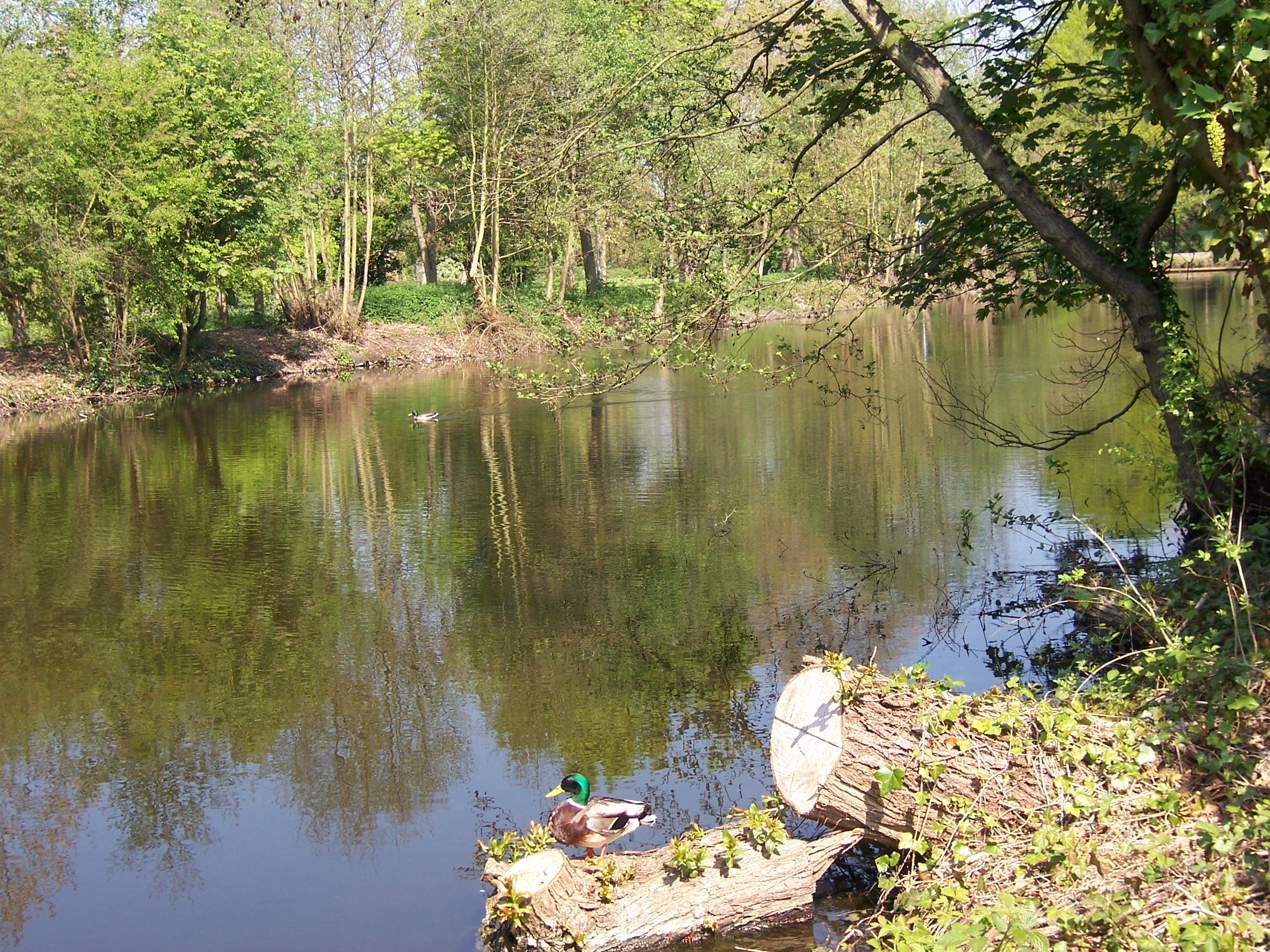
Swakeleys Lake, to the west of the house

The manor of Swakeleys was named after Robert Swalcliffe, 14th-century owner of the manor, who is also recorded as "Swalcleve". John Charlton later took ownership of Swakeleys but a relative of his was subsequently killed during the Battle of Bosworth Field in 1485, while fighting on the side of Richard III. The victor of the battle, Henry VII, subsequently granted Charlton's widow a life interest in the manor, although he gave possession to Sir Thomas Bourchier. The Bourchiers later passed Swakeleys to Sir John Pecche, from whom it then passed to the Earl of Devon, Henry Courteney, then Ralph Pexall.

The house was built for Sir Edmund Wright, who became Lord Mayor of London in 1640. The brick structure dates from between 1629 and 1638. In 1629, Wright purchased the grounds from John Bingley, who had undertaken extensive remedial work on an existing 13th century structure in the grounds—probably timber-framed and wattle filled. Bingley's alterations were said to have been detrimental to the condition of the house and grounds. He was accused of driving away almost all the birds in the dovehouse, and of pulling up many healthy fruit-bearing trees from the orchard. The house had a moat, which Bingley filled in, believing the water to be unhealthy, at which point he also had a defensive brick wall built around the house.

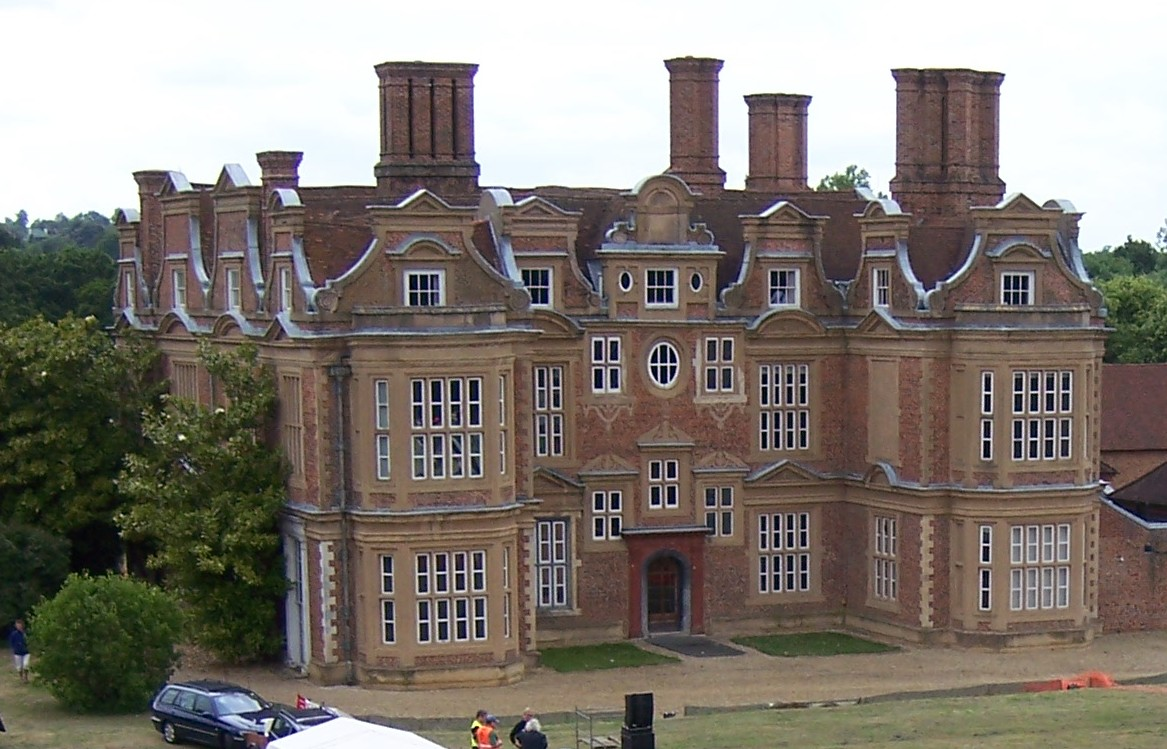
The house

The house is a leading example of what Sir John Summerson calls "Artisan Mannerism", a development of Jacobean architecture led by a group of mostly London-based craftsmen still active in their guilds (called livery companies in London). Swakeleys shows "what a gulf there was between the taste of the Court and that of the City." It features prominently the fancy quasi-classical gable ends that were a mark of the style. Other houses in the style are the "Dutch House", as it was known, now Kew Palace (1630s), West Horsley Place and Slyfield Manor, the last two near Guildford.

The house is built in an "H" shape with a central section flanked by four projecting wings. Swakeleys was built of English Bond brick, with its windows framed with stone. Several of the exterior rain-water heads show the year construction was completed along with the initials "E.W." for Sir Edmund Wright. To the west of the house, a large lawn stretches out to what is now known as Swakeleys Lake. The main routes leading to the house have since become the residential streets Swakeleys Road (then Back Lane), The Grove and The Avenue.

Inside, the main staircase is made of oak, and the fireplaces of marble. The 42 foot (13 m) long by 23 foot (7.0 m) wide Great Chamber, also known as the Ball Room and the Long Gallery, originally had a pinewood floor. It was covered by new flooring after it became worn over time. The room is 16 foot (4.9 m) high, with the ceiling arranged in fifteen panels. Within the room is a wooden screen made for Sir James Harrington in 1655 by woodcarver John Colt and painted to resemble stone. On top of the screen sits a bust of Charles I flanked by two lions. In the Dining Room, the panelling is believed to be from the original house, which Sir Edmund was so impressed by that he had it incorporated into the new building.

=== Subsequent ownership ===
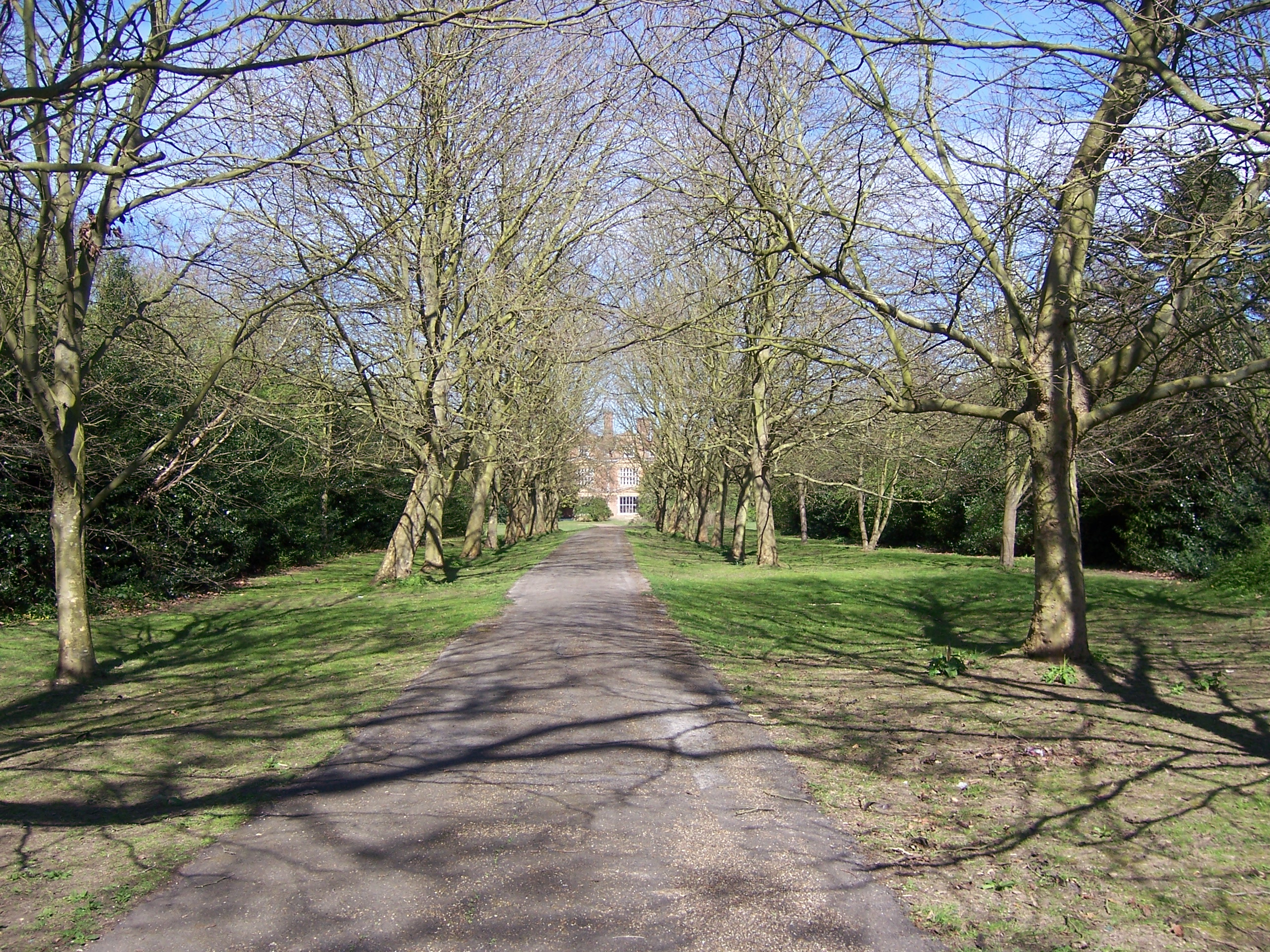
Driveway approaching Swakeleys House from the south

Wright's son-in-law Sir James Harrington took over ownership from Sir Edmund. Harrington was a commissioner at the trial of Charles I and fled to France in 1660 upon the restoration of the monarchy. His wife, Lady Harrington, sold the house to Sir Robert Vyner.

Samuel Pepys visited the house in 1665 and noted some of its features, particularly the busts of Charles I, Lord Essex and Lord Fairfax and described the house as "a very pleasant place". He visited the house twice to collect money on behalf of Charles II from Sir Robert Vyner who was a well-known goldsmith. On one occasion, Sir Robert showed Pepys the body of a black boy who had worked at the house and died of tuberculosis. The body had been dried in an oven and kept in an open coffin and was then displayed to visitors. Sir Robert later became Lord Mayor of London in 1674. After the house became empty in 1923, workmen unsealed a cupboard near the servants' quarters where it was believed the body was stored, though they found no trace of it.

Pepys wrote of his first visit:

...and so we together merrily to Swakeleys, Sir R. Viner's. He took us up and down with great respect, and showed us all his house and grounds: and it is a place not very moderne in the garden nor house, but the most uniforme in all that ever I saw; and some things to excess. Pretty to see over the screen of the hall (put up by Sir J. Harington, a Long Parliament man) the King's head, and my Lord of Essex on one side, and Fairfax on the other; and upon the other side of the screene the parson of the parish and the lord of the manor and his sisters. The window-cases, door-cases, and chimneys of all the house are marble.

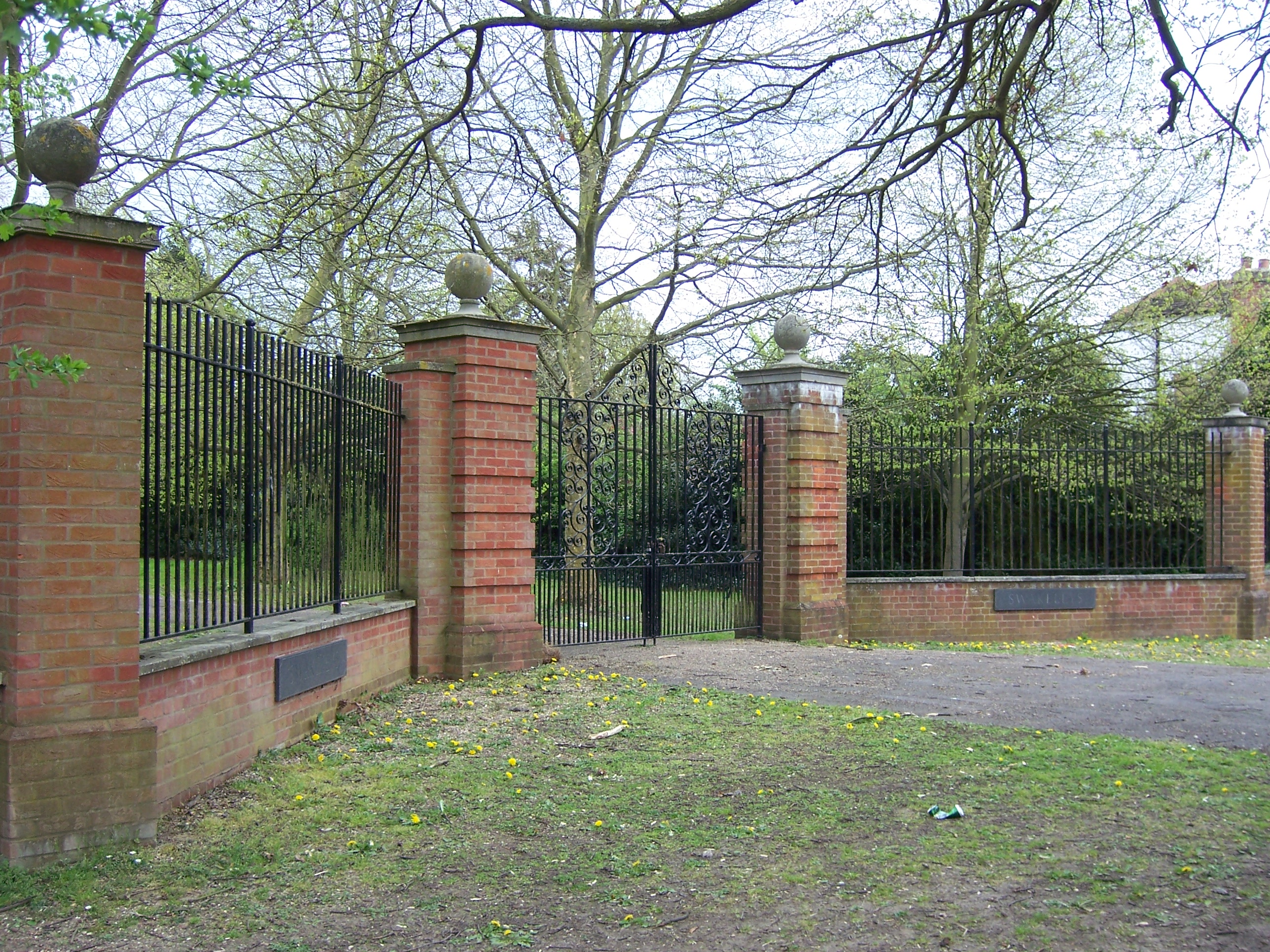
The main gates at the beginning of the driveway

Sir Robert died in 1688, when Swakeleys passed to his nephew Thomas Vyner, whose son Robert sold it to Benjamin Lethiullier in 1741 on behalf of his sister-in-law's son Benjamin. In 1750, Lethiullier's son sold the house to the Reverend Thomas Clarke, at that time rector of Ickenham. Clarke's son Thomas Truesdale Clarke succeeded his father in ownership of the house in 1796. He was later found drowned in the River Pinn, which ran through the Swakeleys estate. Although the river was only 20 inches (51 cm) deep, it was enough to cover his face and therefore cause drowning. An inquest was held which refused to return a suicide verdict as the coroner believed such a ruling would stigmatise the Clarke family.

Edward Walford also wrote about Swakeleys House in 1893, when he described it as "the most interesting Jacobean house in the whole county of Middlesex. The gardens are quaint and trim, laid out in something of the old-fashioned style and a long avenue of elms adorns the front of the house to the south." The avenue was developed as the residential road The Grove, though the elms were killed by Dutch elm disease in the 1960s.

While Albert Gilbey was the main tenant of the house in the 1890s, the All England Croquet Championships were held in the grounds. Gilbey later became High Sheriff of Middlesex in 1912. The estate became significantly smaller following the disposal of 1,382 acres (559 ha) of the estate for development at an auction on 5 July 1922. Warren Road, Swakeleys Drive, Court Road, Milton Road, Ivy House Road, The Avenue and Thornhill Road (originally named Park Road) were constructed while other land bordering the River Pinn was designated as public open land. Humphrey John Talbot bought the house to avoid it being demolished and eventually sold it to the Foreign and Commonwealth Office Sports Association in 1927, upon the condition he could remain as a tenant on the first floor. Swakeleys was requisitioned by the military during the Second World War when a searchlight battery operated within the grounds. The Foreign Office retained the house until 1955 when it was sold to the London Postal Region Sports Club. The club staged cricket matches with local teams from Ickenham and Uxbridge.

=== Restoration ===
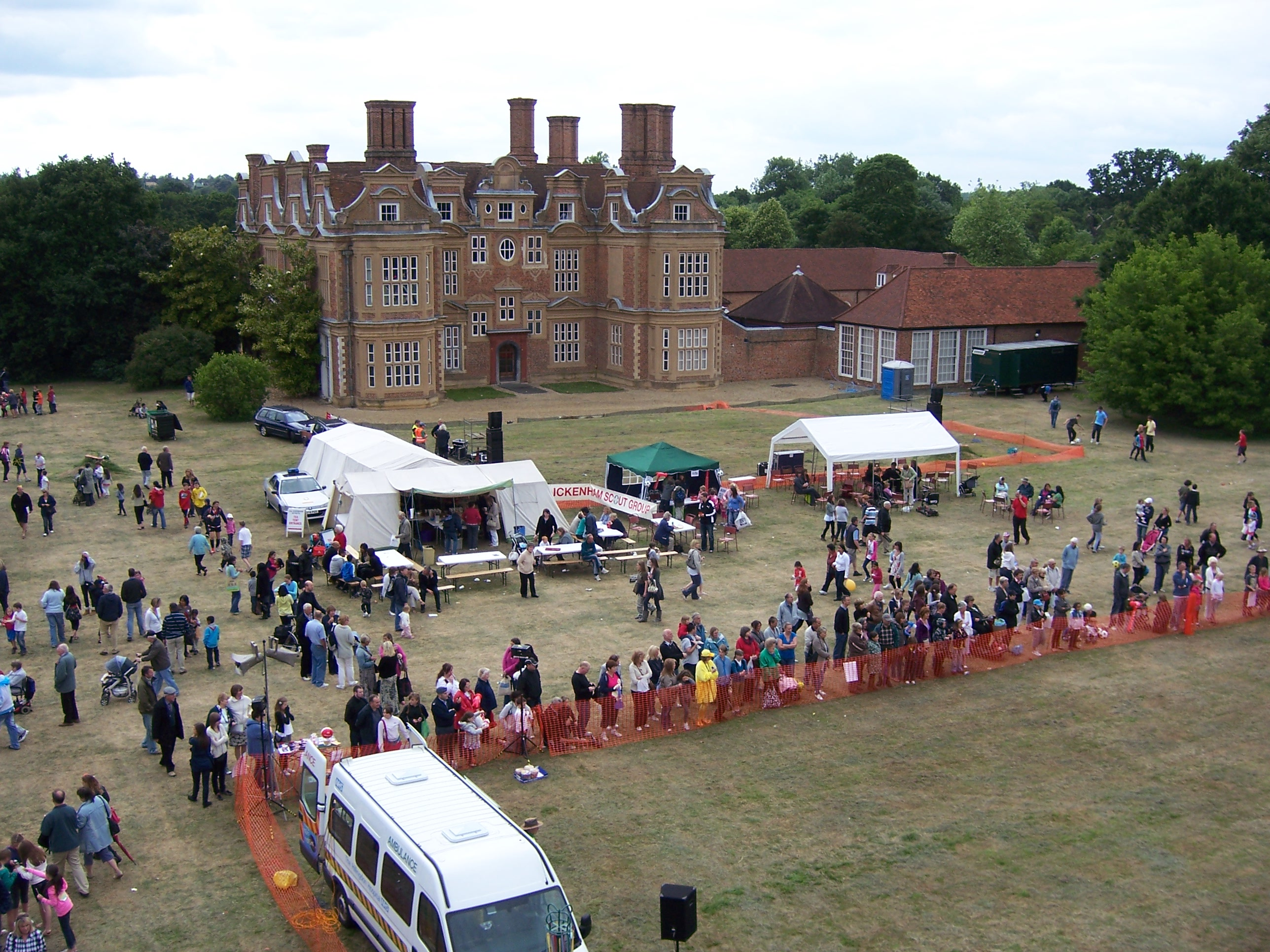
The 2010 Ickenham Festival within the grounds of the house

Three local residents, Keith Chamberlain, Paul Newson and Simon Kreiger, formed Swakeleys House Ltd as a non-profit company to purchase the house in 1980 following a long period of deterioration. They then restored its key features and constructed new office buildings within the grounds to help finance the restoration works. In 1984, a 25-year lease was negotiated with the Bristol-Myers Squibb company and the house was opened to the public for three days a year. HRH Prince Philip the Duke of Edinburgh officially opened the newly refurbished house on 7 May 1985. Swakeleys House Ltd went on to win the 1988 Country House Award for best conversion of a listed country house.

In 1967, the opening cricket scene of Carry On Follow that Camel was filmed on the grounds.

During 2012, scenes for the film Great Expectations, and the television adaptation of Mr Stink, were filmed within the house.

In 2025, Swakeleys House was the 'St. Bartholomew’s rehabilitation center' in the 2nd season of Guy Ritchie's series The Gentlemen.

=== New ownership ===
The Bristol-Myers Squibb lease expired in 2009 and Swakeleys was sold to new owners who wished to reduce public access to one day a year, as part of Open House London. This new proposal was accepted by the London Borough of Hillingdon in June 2010.

In 2014, the new owner of Swakeleys, CES Properties (Ickenham), received planning permission from Hillingdon Council to convert the house back into a single large residence, including 23 en-suite bedrooms, a party pavilion and a stable. CES Properties placed restrictions on the staging of the Ickenham Festival that year, leading to the festival's organising committee relocating its planned gala day and evening events to the nearby Vyners School. The festival had previously used the grounds of the house as a focal point for events. CES Properties placed the house up for sale in February 2015 for £45 million.

== See also ==
- Jacobean architecture
- Artisan Mannerism
- Grade I listed buildings in the London Borough of Hillingdon
- Open House London
