= Edmund Wright (lord mayor) =

English merchant

Sir Edmund Wright (1573-July 1643) was an English merchant who was Lord Mayor of London in 1640.

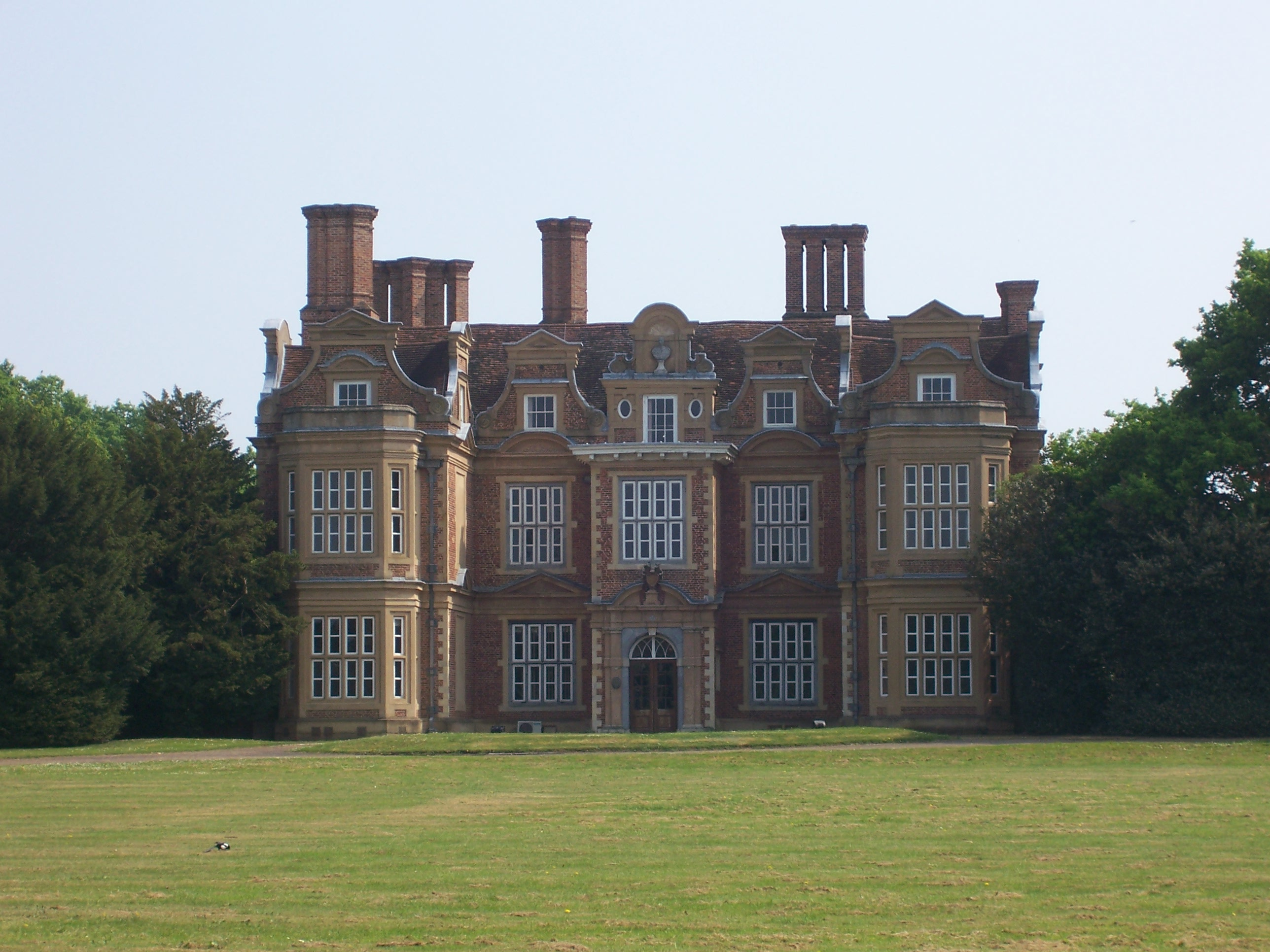
Swakeleys House

Wright, who was born at Nantwich, Cheshire, was a city of London merchant and a member of the Worshipful Company of Grocers. On 23 June 1629 he was elected an alderman of the City of London for Cordwainer ward. He was Sheriff of London in 1629 and 1630. In 1629, he purchased the grounds of Swakeleys House from John Bingley, who had undertaken extensive remedial work on an existing 13th century structure in the grounds—probably timber-framed and wattle filled. Between 1629 and 1638 he rebuilt the house as a brick structure.

In 1640 Wright became Lord Mayor of London after his predecessor was displaced by parliament. He was knighted on 20 June 1641 and was president of St. Thomas' Hospital from 1642 to 1643.

By two wives, Wright had two sons (who died young) and six daughters, three of whom married respectively Sir James Harrington, 3rd Baronet, Sir Richard Atkyns and Sir Robert Cordell, 1st Baronet.

Civic offices
Preceded by Sir William Acton, 1st Baronet	Lord Mayor of the City of London; 1640	Succeeded by Sir Richard Gurney, 1st Baronet
