= History of local government districts in Middlesex =

The History of local government districts in Middlesex outside the metropolitan area began in 1835 with the formation of poor law unions. This was followed by the creation of various forms of local government body to administer the rapidly growing towns of the area. By 1934 until its abolition in 1965, the entire county was divided into urban districts or municipal boroughs.

== Poor law unions ==
The parishes of the county were grouped under the Poor Law Amendment Act 1834 to form unions. Each union had a single workhouse, and was administered by a board of guardians elected by the parish ratepayers. The boundaries of the unions would later be used to define rural sanitary districts in 1875 and rural districts in 1894. Poor law unions were abolished in 1930 by the Local Government Act 1929.

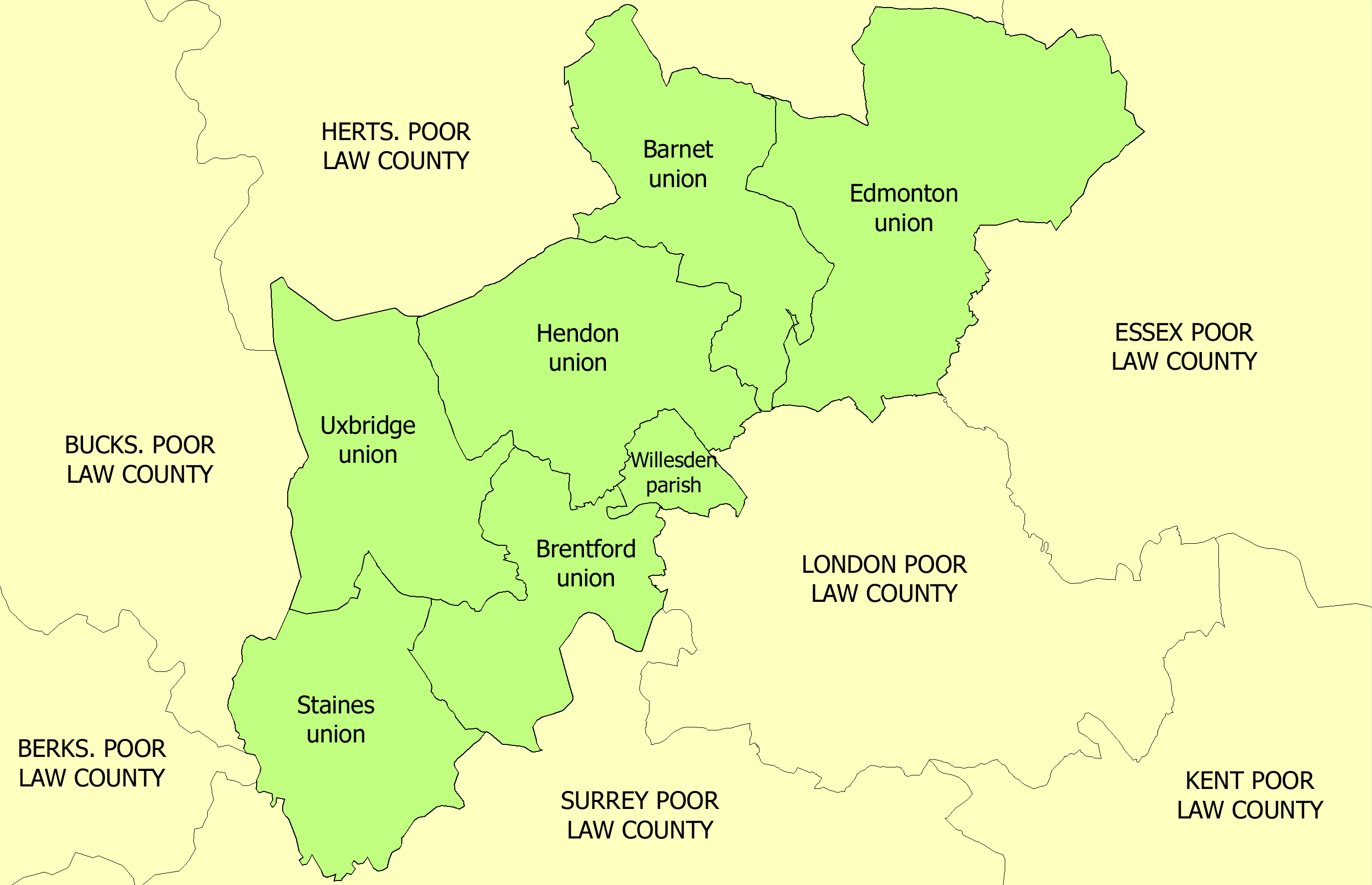
Map of the poor law unions in 1840

Name	Parishes	Notes
Barnet PLU	Friern Barnet, Finchey, Monken Hadley, South Mimms	Remainder of PLU in Hertfordshire
Brentford PLU	Acton, Chiswick, Ealing, Greenford, Hanwell, Heston, Isleworth, New Brentford, Old Brentford, Perivale, Twickenham, West Twyford	
Edmonton PLU	Edmonton, Enfield, Hornsey, Southgate, Tottenham, Wood Green	Included the parish of Hampstead (in the Metropolis) until 1848, Waltham Holy Cross in Essex and Cheshunt in Hertfordshire
Hendon PLU	Edgware, Great Stanmore, Harrow on the Hill, Harrow Weald, Hendon, Kingsbury, Little Stanmore, Pinner, Wealdstone, Wembley, Willesden (until 1896)	
Kingston PLU	Hampton, Hampton Wick, Teddington	Majority of PLU in Surrey
Staines PLU	Ashford, Cranford, East Bedfont, Feltham, Hanworth, Harlington, Harmondsworth, Laleham, Littleton, Shepperton, Staines, Stanwell, Sunbury	
Uxbridge PLU	Cowley, Harefield, Hayes, Hillingdon, Ickenham, Northolt, Northwood, Ruislip, Uxbridge, West Drayton, Yiewsley	
Willesden Poor Law Parish	Willesden	Formed 1896

== Local boards of health ==
An outbreak of cholera in Tottenham forced the creation of a temporary local board of health in 1831/32. Following the enactment of the Public Health Act 1848 (11 & 12 Vict. c. 63), permanent boards could be formed on petition of the inhabitants or where there was excess mortality. The first local board in England formed under the Act was at Uxbridge in 1849, and it was followed by a number of other towns. The Local Government Act 1858 simplified the process of creating local councils: ratepayers of a parish or area could adopt the Act by resolution, whereupon it would become a Local Government District, governed by a Local Board. Numerous localities in Middlesex took the opportunity, and it also provided the mechanism for the developing communities of Southgate and Wood Green to separate themselves from the control of the Edmonton and Tottenham boards.

== Sanitary districts ==
The system was rationalised by the Public Health Act 1875 (38 & 39 Vict. c. 55), which designated all municipal boroughs, local board districts, local government districts and improvement commissioners districts in England and Wales as urban sanitary districts. The existing local authority became an urban sanitary authority, without change of title. Also created were rural sanitary districts, which were identical in area to poor law unions, less any urban sanitary district. The poor law guardians for the parishes in the district became the rural sanitary authority.

== List of districts 1848–1894 ==
=== Local boards and urban sanitary districts 1848–1894 ===
Local board districts (LBDs) were created by the Public Health Act 1848 (11 & 12 Vict. c. 63) and governed by a local board of health; local government districts (LGDs) were created by the Local Government Act 1858 and governed by a local board. Chiswick was an improvement commissioners district (ICD) created by local act of Parliament.

Name	Formed	Area covered
Acton LGD	1865	Parish of Acton
Chiswick ICD	1858	Parish of Chiswick
Ealing LGD	1863	Parish of Ealing less chapelry of Old Brentford
Edmonton LBD	1850	Originally covered entire parish of Edmonton. In 1881 the Southgate area formed a separate LGD. The boundary with Enfield LBD was adjusted in 1883.
Enfield LBD	1850	Most of the parish of Enfield, part of Edmonton parish from 1883.
Hampton LGD	1890	Parish of Hampton
Hampton Wick LGD	1863	Hamlet of Hampton Wick (part of Hampton parish); Constituted separate parish in 1866.
Harrow LBD	1850	Part of the parish of Harrow-on-the Hill (Harrow on the Hill, Roxeth, and parts of Greenhill and Sudbury)
Hornsey LGD	1867	The part of the parish of Hornsey not included in South Hornsey LGD. Gained part of Friern Barnet parish in 1883.
South Hornsey LGD	1863	Part of the parish of Hornsey (Brownswood Park)
Teddington LGD	1867	Parish of Teddington
Tottenham LBD	1850	Parish of Tottenham: Wood Green area became a separate LGD in 1888.
Twickenham LGD	1868	Parish of Twickenham
Uxbridge LBD	1849	Hamlet (later parish) of Uxbridge and western part of parish of Hillingdon.
Friern Barnet LGD	1883	Most of parish of Friern Barnet
Brentford LGD	1874	Chapelries of Old Brentford (Ealing parish) and New Brentford (Hanwell parish)
Finchley LGD	1878	Parish of Finchley
Hanwell LGD	1885	Parish of Hanwell
Hendon LGD	1879	Parish of Hendon
Heston and Isleworth LGD	1875	Parishes of Heston and Isleworth
Norwood LGD	1891	Parish of Norwood
Southgate LGD	1881	Southgate area of Edmonton parish.
Staines LGD	1872	Parish of Staines
Willesden LGD	1874	Parish of Willesden
Wood Green LGD	1888	Wood Green area of Tottenham parish.
East Barnet Valley LGD	1863	Part of Monken Hadley parish Remainder of LGD in Hertfordshire.
Barnet LGD	1863	Part of Monken Hadley parish Remainder of LGD in Hertfordshire.

=== Rural sanitary districts 1875–1894 ===
Name	Notes	Area covered
Barnet RSD	Mostly in Hertfordshire	Parishes of Finchley (until 1878), Friern Barnet (until 1883), South Mimms. Became South Mimms Rural District in 1894.
Brentford RSD		Parishes of Greenford, Hanwell (until 1885), Perivale, West Twyford. Became Greenford UD in 1894.
Edgware RSD	Renamed Hendon RSD 1877	Parishes of Edgware, Great Stanmore, Kingsbury, Little Stanmore and Pinner; and part of the parish of Harrow on the Hill (Harrow Weald, Wealdstone and Wembley areas). Became Hendon RD, Wealdstone UD, Wembley UD in 1894.
Kingston RSD	Mostly in Surrey	Parish of Hampton (until 1890). No Middlesex parishes after 1890.
Staines RSD		Parishes of Ashford, Cranford, East Bedfont, Feltham, Hanworth, Harlington, Harmondsworth, Laleham, Littleton, Shepperton, Stanwell and Sunbury. Became Staines RD, Sunbury on Thames UD 1894.
Uxbridge RSD		Parishes of Cowley, Harefield, Hayes, Ickenham, Northolt, Northwood (until 1891), Ruislip and West Drayton and part of Hillingdon parish. Became Uxbridge RD in 1894.

== County districts 1894–1965 ==
The Local Government Act 1894 (56 & 57 Vict. c. 73) divided the administrative county into four rural districts and thirty-one urban districts, based on existing sanitary districts. One urban district, South Hornsey was a detached part of Middlesex within the County of London until 1900, when it was transferred to the latter county. The rural districts were Hendon, South Mimms, Staines and Uxbridge. Because of increasing urbanisation these had all been abolished by 1934. Urban districts had been created, merged, and many had gained the status of municipal borough by 1965. The districts as at the 1961 census were:

Municipal history 1894–1965	Borough incorporation	District/borough in 1965	Population 1951	Population 1961	1965 fate
Acton UD formed 1894	1921	Acton MB	67,471	65,586	LB Ealing
Brentford UD, Chiswick UD formed 1894, amalgamated as Brentford and Chiswick UD 1927	1932	Brentford and Chiswick MB	59,367	54,833	LB Hounslow
Ealing UD created 1894, absorbed Greenford UD, Hanwell UD 1926	1901	Ealing MB	187,323	183,077	LB Ealing
Edmonton UD created 1894	1937	Edmonton MB	104,270	91,956	LB Enfield
Enfield UD created 1894	1955	Enfield MB	110,465	109,542	LB Enfield
Feltham UD created 1904 from Staines RD, absorbed East Bedfont, Hanworth on abolition of Staines RD 1934	n/a	Feltham UD	44,861	51,047	LB Hounslow
Finchley UD created 1894	1933	Finchley MB	69,991	69,370	LB Barnet
Friern Barnet UD created 1894	n/a	Friern Barnet UD	29,163	28,813	LB Barnet
Harrow on the Hill UD created 1894, Harrow UD formed 1934 from Harrow on the Hill UD part of abolished Wealdstone UD, Harrow Weald, Pinner, Little Stanmore, Great Stanmore from abolished Hendon RD	1954	Harrow MB	219,494	209,080	LB Harrow (boundaries unchanged)
Hayes UD created 1904 from part of Uxbridge RD, Hayes and Harlington UD created 1930 by merger of Hayes UD and Cranford and Harlington from abolished Staines RD	n/a	Hayes and Harlington UD	65,596	67,915	LB Hillingdon
Hendon UD created 1894, absorbed Edgware from Hendon RD 1931	1932	Hendon MB	155,857	151,843	LB Barnet
Heston and Isleworth UD created 1894	1932	Heston and Isleworth MB	106,847	103,013	LB Hounslow
Hornsey UD created 1894	1903	Hornsey MB	98,159	97,962	LB Haringey
South Mimms RD created 1894, became Potters Bar UD 1934	n/a	Potters Bar UD	17,172	23,376	Hertfordshire
Created 1904 from part of Uxbridge RD	n/a	Ruislip-Northwood UD	68,288	72,791	LB Hillingdon
Southall Norwood UD created 1894, renamed Southall 1936	1936	Southall MB	55,896	52,983	LB Ealing
Southgate UD created 1894	1933	Southgate MB	73,377	72,359	LB Enfield
Created 1894, absorbed Ashford, Laleham and Stanwell from abolished Staines RD 1930	n/a	Staines UD	39,995	49,838	Surrey
Created 1894, absorbed Littleton and Shepperton from abolished Staines RD 1930	n/a	Sunbury-on-Thames UD	23,394	33,437	Surrey
Tottenham UD created 1894	1934	Tottenham MB	126,929	113,249	LB Haringey
Twickenham UD created 1894, absorbed Hampton UD, Hampton Wick UD, Teddington UD 1937	1926	Twickenham MB	105,663	100,971	LB Richmond
Uxbridge UD created 1894, absorbed Cowley, Harefield, Hillingdon East and Ickenham from abolished Uxbridge RD 1929	1955	Uxbridge MB	55,960	63,941	LB Hillingdon
Wembley UD created 1894, absorbed Kingsbury UD, part of abolished Wealdstone UD 1934	1937	Wembley MB	131,384	124,892	LB Brent
Willesden UD created 1894	1933	Willesden MB	179,697	171,001	LB Brent
Wood Green UD created 1894	1933	Wood Green MB	52,228	47,945	LB Haringey
Yiewsley UD created 1911 from part of Uxbridge RD, absorbed Harmondsworth, West Drayton from abolished Uxbridge RD to become Yiewsley and West Drayton UD 1929	n/a	Yiewsley and West Drayton UD	20,468	23,723	LB Hillingdon
