= Royal Commission on Local Government in Greater London =

1957 government commission in the United Kingdom

The Royal Commission on Local Government in Greater London, also known as the Herbert Commission, was established in 1957 and published its report in 1960. The report made recommendations for the overhaul of the administration of the capital. They were modified and implemented by the London Government Act 1963.

== Membership ==
The chairman of the Commission was Sir Edwin Herbert. The other members were:

- Paul Cadbury, chairman of Cadbury Brothers, and former member of Birmingham City Council’s reconstruction committee
- Alice Johnston, member of the National Assistance Board
- William Lawson, president of the Institute of Chartered Accountants in England and Wales
- William Mackenzie, professor of government, Victoria University, Manchester
- Sir Charles Morris, vice-chancellor of the University of Leeds
- Sir John Wrigley, former Deputy Secretary of the Ministry of Housing and Local Government

The membership of the commission was notable for not containing anyone with previous involvement with local government in the London area.

== Terms of reference ==
The Commission’s terms of reference were to "examine the present system and working of Local Government in the Greater London area; to recommend whether any, and if so what, changes in local government structure and the distribution of local government functions in the area, or any part of it, would better secure effective and convenient local government."

== Area under review ==
- Administrative County of London
- Administrative County of Middlesex
- The county boroughs of Croydon (Surrey), East Ham and West Ham (Essex)
- The following county districts in the county of Surrey:
  - The boroughs of Barnes, Beddington and Wallington, Epsom and Ewell, Kingston-upon-Thames, Malden and Coombe, Mitcham, Richmond, Surbiton, Sutton and Cheam and Wimbledon
  - The urban districts of Banstead, Carshalton, Caterham and Warlingham, Coulsdon and Purley, Esher, Merton and Morden and Walton and Weybridge,
- The following county districts in the county of Kent:
  - The boroughs of Beckenham, Bexley, Bromley, Dartford and Erith
  - The urban districts of Chislehurst and Sidcup, Crayford, Orpington and Penge,
- The following county districts and parishes in the county of Hertford,
  - The borough of Watford,
  - The urban districts of Barnet, Bushey, Cheshunt, Chorleywood, East Barnet and Rickmansworth,
  - The rural district of Elstree
  - The parish of Northaw in the rural district of Hatfield
  - The parishes of Aldenham and Watford Rural in the rural district of Watford,
- The following county districts in the county of Essex:
  - The boroughs of Barking, Chingford, Dagenham, Ilford, Leyton, Romford, Walthamstow and Wanstead and Woodford
  - The urban districts of Chigwell, Hornchurch and Waltham Holy Cross.

The existing local authorities varied widely in population and size: the six county councils or county boroughs in the metropolitan area had similar responsibilities, but the number of inhabitants in their areas under their control varied from over 3,000,000 to 110,000. There were 102 county districts within the review area and these also varied greatly: some had larger populations and rateable value than existing county boroughs, while others had only a few thousand residents. Outside of the County of London, the division of functions between county councils and county districts was also unclear: some districts enjoyed considerable independence with a range of delegated “county” powers while similar districts did not. There were no set criteria for such delegation, which instead came about because of "fortuitous historical, political and personal factors", which led to "serious administrative friction" in some counties.

== Work ==
The Commission held 114 meetings, heard oral evidence on 70 occasions and asked nearly 16,000 questions. The Commission was also able to draw on the work of the Greater London Group of the London School of Economics, which had carried out an extensive survey on local government in London.

The evidence heard by the Commission was contradictory: the Ministry of Local Government and Housing depicted a system that was breaking down, but the local authorities vigorously defended the status quo.

In the absence of consensus, the Commission drew up two criteria by which to guide its recommendations:

- Efficiency and economy in the use of human and financial resources
- Maintenance of healthy local democracy

By following these criteria a two-tier system was envisaged, with a regional authority for "technical" services and smaller local authorities for "personal" services. Many of the deliberations involved trying to find an optimum size for the sub-units of the proposed system. The general agreement of witnesses was that a basic "many-purpose" unit should have a population of between at least 250,000, many favouring a range of 500,000 to 1,500,000. It was stressed by council officers and teachers that authorities would need to be of a sufficiently large size to provide promotion prospects and attract good staff.

The Commission, however, favoured smaller units because of the second criterion: large authorities, it was felt, would be remote from their citizens. It also hoped that smaller local authorities would encourage greater participation in local elections. The Commission displayed a dislike of "bigness", in particular describing the London County Council as "massive", "inhuman" and "monolithic".

Three criteria were used by the commission to consider if places on the periphery should be included in the review area. They were the extent to which a locality was independent and freestanding, the closeness of links with the capital, and the psychological outlook of the district towards or away from London. In 1960 the commission deleted Potters Bar and all parts of Hertfordshire aside from Cheshunt, Barnet and East Barnet from the review area.

== Report ==
The Report of the Royal Commission on Local Government in Greater London, 1957–60, (Cmnd. 1164) was published on 19 October 1960. The recommendations in the unanimous report were:

- The establishment of a Regional Council for Greater London. The council was to be entirely elected, with one member for each parliamentary constituency.
- The Regional Council was to administer "strategic services" such as town planning, traffic management, education, fire and ambulance services.
- A second tier of local units, called "Greater London Boroughs", would be formed by amalgamation of the existing metropolitan boroughs, county boroughs, municipal boroughs and county districts.
- Greater London Boroughs were to have a population of between 100,000 and 250,000.
- Some services would need to be shared between the two tiers. For example, the regional authority would decide on the educational budget, maintenance of standards, planning of location and types of schools and the recruitment of teachers; the boroughs would oversee the day-to-day administration of all schools in their area.

The Commission did not include the entire review area within its proposed Greater London region: they excluded Aldenham, Bushey, Chorleywood, Dartford, Elstree, Northaw, Potters Bar, Rickmansworth, Waltham Holy Cross, Watford and Watford Rural.

The report proposed a total of fifty-two Greater London Boroughs, to be formed from the following existing areas:

1. City of London
2. City of Westminster
3. Finsbury/Holborn/Shoreditch
4. Islington
5. Hackney/Stoke Newington
6. Bethnal Green/Poplar/Stepney
7. Woolwich
8. Deptford/Greenwich
9. Lewisham
10. Camberwell
11. Bermondsey/Southwark
12. Lambeth
13. Wandsworth (part)
14. Battersea/Wandsworth (part)
15. Hammersmith/Fulham
16. Kensington/Chelsea
17. Paddington/St Marylebone
18. Hampstead/St Pancras
19. Chingford/Walthamstow
20. Chigwell/Leyton/Wanstead and Woodford
21. Ilford
22. Romford
23. Hornchurch
24. Barking/Dagenham
25. East Ham
26. West Ham
27. Bexley/Crayford/Erith
28. Chislehurst and Sidcup/Orpington
29. Beckenham/Bromley/Penge
30. Croydon
31. Caterham and Warlingham/Coulsdon and Purley
32. Banstead/Epsom and Ewell
33. Beddington and Wallington/Carshalton/Sutton and Cheam
34. Merton and Morden/Mitcham/Wimbledon
35. Barnes/Richmond
36. Kingston upon Thames/Malden and Coombe/Surbiton
37. Esher/Walton and Weybridge
38. Feltham/Staines/Sunbury-on-Thames
39. Twickenham
40. Heston and Isleworth
41. Acton/Brentford and Chiswick
42. Ealing
43. Hayes and Harlington/Southall
44. Ruislip-Northwood/Uxbridge/Yiewsley and West Drayton
45. Harrow
46. Wembley
47. Willesden
48. Hendon
49. Barnet/East Barnet/Finchley/Friern Barnet
50. Hornsey/Southgate/Wood Green
51. Edmonton/Tottenham
52. Cheshunt/Enfield

== Government reaction and legislation ==
By May 1961, the government had announced that a number of areas on the edge of the conurbation would be excluded from Greater London. It published a white paper on 29 November 1961 that accepted most of the recommendations. However, it felt education should be a borough-level function in most parts of the capital, with a single authority for central London. It also proposed larger, fewer boroughs. In December, the government proposed that there should be 34 boroughs, rather than 52, and detailed their boundaries. By the time of the introduction of legislation in 1962, the number of boroughs had been reduced to 32, and the area of Greater London again reduced by the exclusion of Banstead, Caterham and Warlingham, Cheshunt, Chigwell (except Hainault), Epsom and Ewell, Esher, Staines, Sunbury-on-Thames, and Walton and Weybridge.

The London Government Act 1963 came into effect on 1 April 1965, with the creation of the Greater London Council and the 32 London borough councils.
