= Chapman code =

3-letter codes used in genealogy

Chapman codes are a set of 3-letter codes used in genealogy to identify the administrative divisions in the United Kingdom, Ireland, the Isle of Man and the Channel Islands.

== Use ==
They were created by the historian Colin R Chapman in the late 1970s, intended to provide a widely used shorthand in genealogy which follows the common practice of describing areas in terms of the counties existing in the 19th and 20th centuries.

== Other uses ==
Chapman codes have no mapping, postal or administrative use. They can however be useful for disambiguation by postal services where a full county name or traditional abbreviation is not supplied after a place name which has more than one occurrence, a particular problem where these are post towns such as Richmond. Many Chapman codes are also used in ISO 3166-2:GB, where they are prefixed with the country code GB-.

== Country codes ==
- CHI Channel Islands
- ENG England
- IOM Isle of Man
- IRL Ireland
- NIR Northern Ireland
- SCT Scotland
- WLS Wales
- ALL All countries

== Channel Islands ==
- ALD Alderney
- GSY Guernsey
- JSY Jersey
- SRK Sark

== England ==
=== Historic counties ===
- BDF Bedfordshire
- BRK Berkshire
- BKM Buckinghamshire
- CAM Cambridgeshire
- CHS Cheshire
- CON Cornwall
- CUL Cumberland
- DBY Derbyshire
- DEV Devonshire
- DOR Dorset
- DUR Durham
- ESS Essex
- GLS Gloucestershire
- HAM Hampshire
- HEF Herefordshire
- HRT Hertfordshire
- HUN Huntingdonshire
- KEN Kent
- LAN Lancashire
- LEI Leicestershire
- LIN Lincolnshire
- MDX Middlesex
- NFK Norfolk
- NTH Northamptonshire
- NBL Northumberland
- NTT Nottinghamshire
- OXF Oxfordshire
- RUT Rutland
- SAL Shropshire (Salop)
- SOM Somerset
- STS Staffordshire
- SFK Suffolk
- SRY Surrey
- SSX Sussex
- WAR Warwickshire
- WES Westmorland
- WIL Wiltshire
- WOR Worcestershire
- YKS Yorkshire
  - ERY East Riding
  - NRY North Riding
  - WRY West Riding

=== Administrative areas ===
- AVN Avon
- CLV Cleveland
- CMA Cumbria
- SXE East Sussex
- GTM Greater Manchester
- HWR Hereford and Worcester
- HUM Humberside
- IOW Isle of Wight
- LND London
- MSY Merseyside
- WMD West Midlands
- NYK North Yorkshire
- SYK South Yorkshire
- TWR Tyne and Wear
- SXW West Sussex
- WYK West Yorkshire

== Scotland ==
=== Historic counties ===
- ABD Aberdeenshire
- ANS Angus (formerly Forfarshire)
- ARL Argyll (Argyllshire)
- AYR Ayrshire
- BAN Banffshire
- BEW Berwickshire
- BUT Bute (Buteshire)
- CAI Caithness
- CLK Clackmannanshire
- DFS Dumfriesshire
- DNB Dunbartonshire
- ELN East Lothian (formerly Haddingtonshire)
- FIF Fife
- INV Inverness-shire
- KCD Kincardineshire
- KRS Kinross-shire
- KKD Kirkcudbrightshire
- LKS Lanarkshire
- MLN Midlothian (formerly Edinburghshire)
- MOR Moray (formerly Elginshire)
- NAI Nairnshire
- OKI Orkney
- PEE Peeblesshire
- PER Perthshire
- RFW Renfrewshire
- ROC Ross and Cromarty
- ROX Roxburghshire
- SEL Selkirkshire
- SHI Shetland
- STI Stirlingshire
- SUT Sutherland
- WLN West Lothian (formerly Linlithgowshire)
- WIG Wigtownshire

=== 1975–1996 regions ===
- BOR Borders
- CEN Central
- DGY Dumfries and Galloway
- FIF Fife
- GMP Grampian
- HLD Highland
- LTN Lothian
- OKI Orkney Isles
- SHI Shetland Isles
- STD Strathclyde
- TAY Tayside
- WIS Western Isles

== Wales ==
=== Historic counties ===
- AGY Anglesey
- BRE Brecknockshire
- CAE Caernarfonshire
- CGN Cardiganshire
- CMN Carmarthenshire
- DEN Denbighshire
- FLN Flintshire
- GLA Glamorgan
- MER Merionethshire
- MON Monmouthshire
- MGY Montgomeryshire
- PEM Pembrokeshire
- RAD Radnorshire

=== 1974–1996 ===
- CWD Clwyd
- DFD Dyfed
- GNT Gwent
- GWN Gwynedd
- MGM Mid Glamorgan
- POW Powys
- SGM South Glamorgan
- WGM West Glamorgan

== Northern Ireland ==
- ANT Antrim
- ARM Armagh
- DOW Down
- FER Fermanagh
- LDY Londonderry
- TYR Tyrone

== Ireland ==
- CAR Carlow
- CAV Cavan
- CLA Clare
- COR Cork
- DON Donegal
- DUB Dublin
- GAL Galway
- KER Kerry
- KID Kildare
- KIK Kilkenny
- LET Leitrim
- LEX Leix (formerly Queen's)
- LIM Limerick
- LOG Longford
- LOU Louth
- MAY Mayo
- MEA Meath
- MOG Monaghan
- OFF Offaly (formerly King's)
- ROS Roscommon
- SLI Sligo
- TIP Tipperary
- WAT Waterford
- WEM Westmeath
- WEX Wexford
- WIC Wicklow

== See also ==
- Historic counties of England
- Historic counties of Scotland
- Historic counties of Wales
- Counties of Northern Ireland
