= London Government Act 1963 =

Act of the Parliament of the United Kingdom

London Government Act 1963 (Note: Section 94(1).)
- Act of Parliament
- Parliament of the United Kingdom
- Long title: An Act to make provision with respect to local government and the functions of local authorities in the metropolitan area; to assimilate certain provisions of the Local Government Act 1933 to provisions for corresponding purposes contained in the London Government Act 1939; to make an adjustment of the metropolitan police district; and for connected purposes.
- Citation: 1963 c. 33
- Territorial extent: England and Wales; Scotland (in part); Northern Ireland (in part); (Note: Section 94(3)–(4).)

Dates
- Royal assent: 31 July 1963
- Commencement: 31 July 1963 (in part); 1 April 1965 (rest of act); (Note: Section 94(2))
Other legislation
Amends	List: Bridges Act 1702; Disorderly Houses Act 1751; Highway Act 1835; London Hackney Carriages Act 1843; Inclosure Act 1845; City of London Sewers Act 1848; Burial Acts 1852; Burial Act 1857; Metropolitan Fire Brigade Act 1865; Metropolitan Streets Act 1867; Public Health Act 1875; Highways and Locomotives (Amendment) Act 1878; Local Government Act 1888; Public Health Acts Amendment Act 1890; Military Lands Act 1892; Public Libraries Act 1892; Telegraph Act 1892; Local Government Act 1894; Canals Protection (London) Act 1898; London Government Act 1899; Public Libraries Act 1901; Alkali, &c. Works Regulation Act 1906; Public Health Acts Amendment Act 1907; London Cab and Stage Carriage Act 1907; Land Settlement (Facilities) Act 1919; Allotments Act 1922; Public Health Act 1925; Rating and Valuation Act 1925; Petroleum (Consolidation) Act 1928; Local Government Act 1929; Land Drainage Act 1930; London Building Act 1930; Children and Young Persons Act 1933; London Passenger Transport Act 1933; Local Government Act 1933; London Building Act 1935; Public Health Act 1936; Public Health (London) Act 1936; Local Government Superannuation Act 1937; Green Belt (London and Home Counties) Act 1938; Civil Defence Act 1939; London Building Acts (Amendment) Act 1939; Water Act 1945; National Health Service Act 1946; Civic Restaurants Act 1947; Statistics of Trade Act 1947; Agriculture Act 1947; Local Government Act 1948; Prevention of Damage by Pests Act 1949; Diseases of Animals Act 1950; Public Utilities Street Works Act 1950; Rag Flock and Other Filling Materials Act 1951; Town Development Act 1952; Local Government (Miscellaneous Provisions) Act 1953; Registration Service Act 1953; Licensing Act 1953; Auxiliary Forces Act 1953; Housing Repairs and Rents Act 1954; Food and Drugs Act 1955; Clean Air Act 1956; Valuation and Rating (Scotland) Act 1956; Nurses Agencies Act 1957; House of Commons Disqualification Act 1957; Rent Act 1957; Housing Act 1957; Housing (Financial Provisions) Act 1958; Local Government Act 1958; Slaughter of Animals Act 1958; Highways Acts 1959; House Purchase and Housing Act 1959; Town and Country Planning Act 1959; Road Traffic Act 1960; Caravan Sites and Control of Development Act 1960; Road Traffic and Roads Improvement Act 1960; Noise Abatement Act 1960; Home Safety Act 1961; Land Compensation Act 1961; Factories Act 1961; Consumer Protection Act 1961; Rating and Valuation Act 1961; Public Health Act 1961; Licensing Act 1961; Trustee Investments Act 1961; Town and Country Planning Act 1962; Transport Act 1962; Road Traffic Act 1962; Local Government (Records) Act 1962; Betting, Gaming and Lotteries Act 1963; Offices, Shops and Railway Premises Act 1963
Repeals/revokes	Bridges Act 1702; Bridges Act 1740; Hammersmith Parish Act 1834; Racecourses Licensing Act 1879; Metropolitan Streets Act 1903; London County Council (Loans) Act 1955
Amended by	List: Licensing Act 1964; Administration of Justice Act 1964; Public Libraries and Museums Act 1964; Port of London Act 1964; City of London (Various Powers) Act 1965; Local Government Act 1966; General Rate Act 1967; Local Government (Termination of Reviews) Act 1967; Road Traffic Regulation Act 1967; Rent Act 1968; Health Services and Public Health Act 1968; Theatres Act 1968; Justices of the Peace Act 1968; Representation of the People Act 1969; Vehicle and Driving Licences Act 1969; Children and Young Persons Act 1969; Transport (London) Act 1969; Agriculture Act 1970; Local Authority Social Services Act 1970; Courts Act 1971; Betting, Gaming and Lotteries (Amendment) Act 1971; Town and Country Planning Act 1971; Superannuation Act 1972; Road Traffic Act 1972; Housing Finance Act 1972; Gas Act 1972; Poisons Act 1972; Local Government Act 1972; Agriculture (Miscellaneous Provisions) Act 1972; Education Act 1973; National Health Service Reorganisation Act 1973; Water Act 1973; Employment And Training Act 1973; Slaughterhouses Act 1974; Statute Law (Repeals) Act 1974; Control of Pollution Act 1974; Statute Law (Repeals) Act 1975; House of Commons Disqualification Act 1975; Northern Ireland Assembly Disqualification Act 1975; Nursing Homes Act 1975; Local Land Charges Act 1975; Statute Law (Repeals) Act 1976; Land Drainage Act 1976; Statute Law (Repeals) Act 1977; Interpretation Act 1978; Statute Law (Repeals) Act 1978; Reserve Forces Act 1980; Education Act 1980; Transport Act 1980; Highways Act 1980; Animal Health Act 1981; Acquisition of Land Act 1981; Wildlife and Countryside Act 1981; Local Government (Miscellaneous Provisions) Act 1982; Representation of the People Act 1983; Litter Act 1983; Telecommunications Act 1984; Public Health (Control of Disease) Act 1984; Food Act 1984; Building Act 1984; Cinemas Act 1985; Local Government Act 1985; Housing (Consequential Provisions) Act 1985; Waste Regulation and Disposal (Authorities) Order 1985; Parliamentary Constituencies Act 1986; Education Reform Act 1988; Local Government Finance Act 1988; Water Act 1989; Statute Law (Repeals) Act 1989; Planning (Consequential Provisions) Act 1990; Food Safety Act 1990; Environmental Protection Act 1990; Local Government Finance (Repeals, Savings and Consequential Amendments) Order 1990; New Roads and Street Works Act 1991; Water Consolidation (Consequential Provisions) Act 1991; Charities Act 1993; Clean Air Act 1993; Appropriation Act 1993; Statute Law (Repeals) Act 1993; Sunday Trading Act 1994; Deregulation (Rag Flock and Other Filling Materials Act 1951) (Repeal) Order 1996; Land Registration Act 1997; School Standards and Framework Act 1998; Greater London Authority Act 1999; Care Standards Act 2000; London Local Authorities Act 2000; Licensing Act 2003; Manufacture and Storage of Explosives Regulations 2005; Local Education Authorities and Children’s Services Authorities (Integration of Functions) Order 2010; Policing and Crime Act 2017
Relates to	London Government Act 1899; Local Government Act 1933; London Government Act 1939

Status: Amended

Text of statute as originally enacted

Revised text of statute as amended

Text of the London Government Act 1963 as in force today (including any amendments) within the United Kingdom, from legislation.gov.uk.

The London Government Act 1963 (c. 33) is an act of the Parliament of the United Kingdom, which created Greater London and a new local government structure within it. The act significantly reduced the number of local government districts in the area, resulting in local authorities responsible for larger areas and populations. The upper tier of local government was reformed to cover the whole of the Greater London area and with a more strategic role; and the split of functions between upper and lower tiers was recast. The act classified the boroughs into inner and outer London groups. The City of London and its corporation were essentially unreformed by the legislation. Subsequent amendments to the act have significantly amended the upper tier arrangements, with the Greater London Council abolished in 1986, and the Greater London Authority introduced in 2000. As of 2024, the London boroughs are more or less identical to those created in 1965, although with some enhanced powers over services such as waste management and education.

== Provisions of the act ==
The act set up a two-tier local government system, with powers divided between the newly formed Greater London Council (GLC), 32 new London borough councils and the existing City of London. The provisions of the act came into effect on 1 April 1965, the new councils having been elected as "shadow authorities" in 1964.

Section 1 of the act established 32 London boroughs, each of which was to be governed by an elected borough council, and was to be regulated by the Municipal Corporations Act 1882 and Local Government Act 1933 (23 & 24 Geo. 5. c. 51). Twelve of the boroughs, corresponding to the former County of London, were designated Inner London boroughs. The remaining twenty boroughs were designated Outer London boroughs. None of the boroughs were given names in the act.

Section 2 declared that the area comprising the areas of the London boroughs, the City and the Temples shall constitute an administrative area to be known as Greater London. An elected Greater London Council was to govern the new area.

Section 3 abolished the administrative counties of Middlesex and London (created in 1889), and absorbed parts of Kent, Essex, Surrey and Hertfordshire plus the whole of the City of London to form the administrative area of Greater London. As well as the two counties, the twenty-eight existing metropolitan boroughs, plus all county boroughs, county districts or parishes that fell wholly within Greater London were to cease to exist, along with their councils. No part of Greater London was to form part of any administrative county, county district or parish. The prohibition on parishes was lifted by the Local Government and Public Involvement in Health Act 2007. Three Middlesex urban districts not included in Greater London were transferred to other counties: Potters Bar to Hertfordshire and Staines and Sunbury-on-Thames to Surrey.

The act also established the Inner London Education Authority to administer schools and colleges in the 12 inner London boroughs. The remaining 20 outer boroughs became local education authorities in their own right. The London Traffic Area and the London and Home Counties Traffic Advisory Committee, set up in 1924, were abolished, with the GLC gaining powers to regulate road traffic. An alteration was also made to the Metropolitan Police District to include the whole of Greater London, but the district continued to include a number of areas in surrounding counties.

=== The boroughs ===
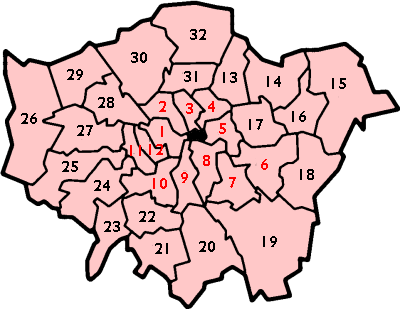
Map of London boroughs as numbered in schedule 1 of the act. Inner London boroughs are labelled in red, while the City of London is shown in black.

The composition of the London boroughs was given in schedule 1 of the act:

1. The metropolitan boroughs of Westminster, Paddington and St Marylebone.
2. The metropolitan boroughs of Hampstead, Holborn and St Pancras.
3. The metropolitan boroughs of Finsbury and Islington.
4. The metropolitan boroughs of Hackney, Shoreditch and Stoke Newington.
5. The metropolitan boroughs of Bethnal Green, Poplar and Stepney.
6. The metropolitan borough of Greenwich and so much of the metropolitan borough of Woolwich as lay south of the centre of the navigable channel of the River Thames at low water.
7. The metropolitan boroughs of Deptford and Lewisham.
8. The metropolitan boroughs of Bermondsey, Camberwell and Southwark.
9. The metropolitan borough of Lambeth and so much of the metropolitan borough of Wandsworth as lay east of Hazelbourne Road, Cavendish Road, the railway between Balham and Streatham Common stations and the railway between Streatham and Mitcham Junction stations.
10. The metropolitan borough of Battersea and the remainder of the metropolitan borough of Wandsworth not included in borough 9.
11. The metropolitan boroughs of Fulham and Hammersmith.
12. The metropolitan boroughs of Chelsea and Kensington
13. The boroughs of Chingford, Leyton and Walthamstow
14. The borough of Ilford, the borough of Wanstead and Woodford, so much of the borough of Dagenham as lay north of Billet Road and an area in the south of the urban district of Chigwell including the Hainault Estate.
15. The borough of Romford and the urban district of Hornchurch.
16. The borough of Barking except the part in Borough 17 and the borough of Dagenham except the part in Borough 14.
17. The county boroughs of East Ham and West Ham, so much of the borough of Barking as lay west of the River Roding and Barking Creek and the part of the metropolitan borough of Woolwich not included in Borough 6.
18. The boroughs of Bexley and Erith, the urban district of Crayford, and so much of the urban district of Chislehurst and Sidcup as lay north of the A20 road.
19. The boroughs of Beckenham and Bromley, the urban districts of Orpington and Penge, and so much of the urban district of Chislehurst and Sidcup as lay south of the A20 road.
20. The county borough of Croydon and the urban district of Coulsdon and Purley.
21. The borough of Beddington and Wallington, the borough of Sutton and Cheam and the urban district of Carshalton.
22. The boroughs of Mitcham and Wimbledon and the urban district of Merton and Morden.
23. The borough of Kingston upon Thames, the borough of Malden and Coombe and the borough of Surbiton.
24. The boroughs of Barnes, Richmond and Twickenham.
25. The borough of Brentford and Chiswick, the borough of Heston and Isleworth, and the urban district of Feltham.
26. The borough of Uxbridge, the urban district of Hayes and Harlington, the urban district of Ruislip-Northwood, and the urban district of Yiewsley and West Drayton.
27. The boroughs of Acton, Ealing and Southall.
28. The boroughs of Wembley and Willesden.
29. The borough of Harrow.
30. The boroughs of Finchley and Hendon, and the urban districts of Barnet, East Barnet and Friern Barnet.
31. The boroughs of Hornsey, Tottenham and Wood Green.
32. The boroughs of Edmonton, Enfield and Southgate.

==== Names ====
As passed, the act did not include names for the new boroughs. Keith Joseph, the minister, asked local councils for suggestions as to possible names, asking that they be a single word if possible, and noting that "the best name will be the place recognised as the centre of the new borough". Double-barrelled names were to be prohibited.

The 'Royal Borough of Charlton' was proposed for the Greenwich and Woolwich metropolitan boroughs. Lewisham and Deptford were unable to agree on whether the borough should be named Lewisham, Deptford or after the central river/stream, Ravensbourne. The councils to become part of the London Borough of Barnet suggested "Northgate" or "Northern Heights" as names. Islington and Finsbury (Borough 3) were also unable to come to a decision, with Finsbury preferring "New River" and Islington preferring Islington. Richmond and Twickenham (Borough 24) disagreed over which, if any of those names should appear in the new borough names. Suggestions for Enfield (Borough 32) included "Enfield Chase" and "Edmonton Hundred".

Nine names were without controversy and were proposed in September 1963:

- Westminster (Borough 1)
- Camden (Borough 2) – "virtually in the centre of the three boroughs"
- Tower Hamlets (Borough 5) – a historic alternative name for the Tower Division of Middlesex
- Redbridge (Borough 14) – named after a red bridge of the River Roding in Ilford
- Newham (Borough 17) – combination of East Ham and West Ham
- Croydon (Borough 20)
- Kingston upon Thames (Borough 23)
- Ealing (Borough 27)
- Haringey (Borough 31) – a variant spelling of Harringay

Six new names were proposed by the Minister in October 1963 for boroughs unable to decide upon a name:

- Bexley (Borough 18)
- Bromley (Borough 19)
- Sutton (Borough 21)
- Richmond upon Thames (Borough 24)
- Hounslow (Borough 25)
- Uxbridge (ultimately changed to Hillingdon) (Borough 26)

The minister proposed a further twelve names in January 1964:

- Greenwich (not Charlton as previously suggested) (Borough 6)
- Hillingdon (not Uxbridge) (Borough 26)
- Islington (Borough 3)
- Hackney (Borough 4)
- Lewisham (Borough 7)
- Southwark (Borough 8)
- Wandsworth (Borough 10)
- Kensington and Chelsea (Borough 12)
- Waltham Forest (Borough 13)
- Havering (Borough 15) – after the former Royal Liberty of Havering, which covered a similar area
- Barking (Borough 16)
- Morden (Borough 22) (ultimately changed to Merton)
- Barnet (Borough 30)
- Enfield (Borough 32)
- Wembley and Willesden (Borough 28) wished to be called "Willesden and Wembley", but was ultimately titled Brent after the River Brent.
- Hammersmith (Borough 11) as Fulham and Hammersmith were unable to choose a single name, and sent a shortlist to the minister, including "Riverside" and "Olympia" (ultimately changed to Hammersmith and Fulham).

Councillors for the metropolitan boroughs of Chelsea and Kensington were divided, and opposed the loss of their two ancient parish names in combining, so the Minister for Housing and Local Government made one exception, and the Royal Borough of Kensington and Chelsea came into being.

=== Distribution of functions ===
The split of functions between the new authorities were:

Greater London Council	Shared	London boroughs
Fire; Ambulance; Refuse disposal; Land drainage; Smallholdings; Thames flood preventions; Motor-vehicle and driving licences	Education (dependent on whether in ILEA / Outer boroughs); Roads; Planning; Housing; Sewage; Traffic	Personal health services; Welfare services; Children's services; Libraries; Refuse collection; Swimming baths; Weights and measures; Food and drugs; Public health inspection; Cemeteries and crematoria; Collection of rates

== Background ==
=== Herbert Report ===
A royal commission was appointed in 1957 under the chairmanship of Sir Edwin Herbert to consider future local government structures in Greater London. The commission delivered its report in October 1960 proposing the creation of a Greater London with 52 Greater London boroughs.

The Greater London area set up by the 1963 act was very similar to that proposed by the Herbert Report but excluded Banstead, Caterham and Warlingham, Esher, Walton and Weybridge in Surrey, Chigwell in Essex, Cheshunt in Hertfordshire, and Staines and Sunbury in Middlesex.

=== Passage through Parliament ===
The government considered that the boroughs should be fewer and larger so published its plan for 34 London boroughs in late 1961. In the County of London this reorganised the proposed boroughs so that combinations for the present boroughs of Camden, Westminster and Islington were achieved. The Hackney borough had Shoreditch rather than the Tower Hamlets borough. Lewisham would be standalone, Deptford would combine with Camberwell and Bermondsey, and Southwark and Lambeth would unite. Eastern Wandsworth was to form a borough in itself, with western Wandsworth being paired with Battersea.

Outside the former County of London, the outer London boroughs were to be:

- Chigwell (north of the Roding – that is, Loughton and Buckhurst Hill)/Chingford/Leyton/Walthamstow/Wanstead and Woodford
- Chigwell (south of the Roding)/Ilford
- Hornchurch (part)/Romford
- Barking/Dagenham/Hornchurch (Rainham and South Hornchurch wards)
- East Ham/West Ham/North Woolwich
- Bexley/Chislehurst and Sidcup/Crayford/Erith
- Beckenham/Bromley/Orpington/Penge
- Caterham and Warlingham/Coulsdon and Purley/Croydon
- Banstead/Beddington and Wallington/Carshalton/Epsom and Ewell/Sutton and Cheam
- Merton and Morden/Mitcham/Wimbledon
- Esher/Kingston/Malden and Coombe/Surbiton/Walton and Weybridge
- Barnes/Richmond/Twickenham
- Brentford and Chiswick/Feltham/Heston and Isleworth/Staines/Sunbury
- Hayes and Harlington/Ruislip-Northwood/Uxbridge/Yiewsley and West Drayton
- Acton/Ealing/Southall
- Wembley/Willesden
- Harrow
- Barnet/Finchley/Hendon
- East Barnet/Enfield (part)/Friern Barnet/Hornsey/Southgate/Wood Green
- Cheshunt/Edmonton/Enfield (part)/Tottenham

The Minister of Housing and Local Government announced, on their request, that five urban districts (Cheshunt, Chigwell, Esher, Staines and Sunbury) were to be excluded from Greater London on 18 May 1961, having earlier confirmed the widely expected exclusion of Banstead, Caterham and Warlingham and Walton and Weybridge.

Requests from the councils of Romford, Barnet, Carshalton, Coulsdon and Purley, Feltham, Yiewsley and West Drayton to be removed from the area were turned down. Additionally, the department decided that the "northern part of the borough of Epsom and Ewell definitely forms part of Greater London and must be included". Epsom and Ewell would ultimately be excluded from the area in its entirety.

Changes published in August 1962 saw a reduction from 33 to 32 boroughs, and in greater detail, Shoreditch to join Hackney; Wanstead and Woodford to be added to Ilford to form 'Redbridge' rather than join Waltham Forest; Chislehurst and Sidcup to be divided between the Bromley borough and the Bexley borough; Barnet, East Barnet, Friern Barnet, Hendon, and Finchley to form a single borough (Barnet), Enfield to join Edmonton and Southgate (to be simply Enfield), the Tottenham, Hornsey and Wood Green authorities to combine to form Haringey and at the most local level, Clapham and Streatham neighbourhoods to join Lambeth.

The slightly amended form was laid before Parliament for substantive debates from November 1962 until April 1963. This proposed the eventually settled 32 more empowered boroughs forming a new administrative county.

=== Support ===
Ministerial proponents of the bill advanced its smooth passage summarising the royal commission's report:

One of those basic strands is that London Government must reflect the physical fact that Greater London is a single city with a recognisable existence of its own: it is a living organism with its heart, its limbs and its lungs. The Surrey [-proposed] Plan does not recognise this important basic fact. Secondly, the Government regard it as vital that the functions that need to be exercised over the whole of Greater London should be in the hands of a body with real positive powers. In no other way can such a Government be effective.

— Earl Jellicoe, Joint Parliamentary Secretary to the Ministry of Local Government and Housing, (Con)

...but [in] ordinary human speech, how is it that such people can be so appalled at acknowledging that they live in what is the greatest capital city in the world?

...

It would be ludicrous for the Government to go to this extent to try to reorganise metropolitan government for the next half century and boggle at including in it the whole of the metropolitan continuous built-up area.

— Sir Keith Joseph, (Con), Minister of Housing and Local Government

I invite hon. Members on both sides to agree that, whatever may have been the merits of saying that the area of the L.C.C. was London in 1848, it is idle to say in 1962 that the frontiers are the same now. Plainly, in the more than 70 years since the L.C.C. came into existence, the whole pattern of London has been transformed.

— Charles Curran, (Con, Uxbridge, Middlesex moved into London under this Bill)

=== Opposition ===
The leaders and all members of the Opposition in both houses saw the bill as being partisan, opposed London's re-casting and celebrated its predecessor:

...you mean to go through with this execution of the London County Council because they have been so successful and they have been so strongly supported for 28 years by the electorate.

— Viscount Alexander of Hillsborough, Leader of Opposition (Lords) (Lab-Coop)

...we believe that it is a party political Bill. We have been told that it is "politics in the raw". It certainly is. If London County Council can be destroyed for political reasons, so can the City of London Common Council.

— John Parker, Lab, Dagenham, Essex, moved into London under this Bill

Five Conservative MPs (for North-West Croydon, South Croydon, Carshalton, Wimbledon and East Surrey) sympathised with a petition from 20,000 to 30,000 people from Croydon and two hillside semi-rural towns not to join London. Former Labour Home Secretary James Chuter Ede, a retired Surrey magistrate and county councillor, co-led the opposition in Committee, having met residents who were all "resolutely and determinedly opposed to the Bill." He was instrumental in getting his own area, Epsom and Ewell, completely excluded. Charles Doughty, MP for East Surrey (including Coulsdon and Purley), prophesied that "A shotgun marriage of the kind proposed in the Bill between Coulsdon, Purley and [the Borough of] Croydon can never be successful...The affinities of Coulsdon and Purley go south, not to the north and east. This is a very bad part of the Bill." The bill passed, and the boundaries including this fusion, have lasted since 1 April 1965.

== Subsequent amendments ==
=== Local Government Act 1972 ===
The Local Government Act 1972 provided a mechanism for councils to change their names: the London Borough of Hammersmith and the London Borough of Barking changed their names after their creation to contain a second locality, to form the London Borough of Hammersmith and Fulham and the London Borough of Barking and Dagenham.

=== Local Government Act 1985 ===
The Local Government Act 1985 abolished the Greater London Council and transferred its functions to the London borough councils, joint arrangements and to central government. The Inner London Education Authority continued to exist as a directly elected authority.

=== Education Reform Act 1988 ===
The Education Reform Act 1988 abolished the Inner London Education Authority and made the inner London boroughs education authorities.

=== Greater London Authority Act 1999 ===
The Greater London Authority Act 1999 created the Greater London Authority as a replacement for the Greater London Council.

== Subsequent developments ==
Section 93(1) of, and schedule 18 to, the act, together with paragraph 67 of schedule 6 and paragraph 29 of schedule 17, were repealed by section 1 of, and part XI of the schedule to, the Statute Law (Repeals) Act 1974, which came into force on 27 June 1974.
