= Middlesex =

Historic county of England

- Historic county
- 1889–1965
- Flag Coat of arms

- Middlesex within Great Britain in 1888
- Area
  - 1801/1881: 734 km^{2} (181,320 acres)
  - 1911: 601.8 km^{2} (148,701 acres)
  - 1961: 601.7 km^{2} (148,691 acres)
  - Coordinates: 51.54°N 0.27°W
- Area transferred
  - 1889: Metropolitan parishes to County of London
- Population
  - 1801: 818,129
  - 1881: 2,920,485
  - 1911: 1,126,465
  - 1961: 2,234,543
- Density
  - 1801: 11/ha (4.5/acre)
  - 1881: 40/ha (16.1/acre)
  - 1911: 19/ha (7.6/acre)
  - 1961: 37/ha (15/acre)
- History
  - Preceded by: Kingdom of Essex
  - Origin: Middle Saxons
  - Created: Early Middle Ages
- Status: Ceremonial county (until 1965); Administrative county (1889–1965)
- Chapman code: MDX (Note: Historic boundaries excluding the City of London, which is code LND.)
- Government: Middlesex Quarter Sessions (until 1889) (Note: The Middlesex Quarter Sessions had jurisdiction in Westminster, but not the Tower Liberty.); Within the metropolis: Metropolitan Board of Works (1855–1889); Middlesex County Council (1889–1965)
  - HQ: see text
- History
  - Established: 1889
  - Disestablished: 1965
- Subdivisions
  - Type: Hundreds (ancient); Districts (1835–1965)
- Today part of: Greater London, Hertfordshire, Surrey

Middlesex (/ˈmɪdəlsɛks/; abbreviation: Middx) is one of the historic counties of England. The county boundary largely follows three rivers: the Thames in the south, the Lea to the east and the Colne to the west, with a line of hills forming its northern boundary with Hertfordshire. It lies almost entirely in the ceremonial county of Greater London, with smaller parts in the counties of Hertfordshire and Surrey. The county is the second smallest of the historic counties of England, after Rutland.

The name of the county derives from its origin as a homeland for the Middle Saxons in the early Middle Ages, with the county subsequently part of that territory in the ninth or tenth century. The City of London, formerly part of the county, became a self governing county corporate in the twelfth century; the City was still able to exert influence as the sheriffs of London maintained their jurisdiction in Middlesex, though the county otherwise remained separate. The diocese of the Bishop of London also extended through Middlesex. To the east of the City, the Tower Division (or Tower Hamlets) had considerable autonomy under its own Lord Lieutenant. To the west, precincts around Westminster and Charing Cross became built up.

Despite London's expansion into rural Middlesex, the Corporation of London resisted attempts to expand the City of London boundaries into the county, posing problems for the administration of local government, public infrastructure, and justice. In the eighteenth and nineteenth centuries, the population density was especially high in the southeast of the county, including the East and West Ends of London. In 1855 the densely populated southeast, together with sections of Kent and Surrey, came under the Metropolitan Board of Works for certain infrastructure purposes, while remaining a part of Middlesex. The Metropolitan Police also developed in the nineteenth century.

When county councils were introduced in 1889, about twenty per cent of the area of the historic county, along with a third of its population, was incorporated into the new administrative county of London. The remainder formed the administrative county of Middlesex, governed by the Middlesex County Council, which met regularly at the Middlesex Guildhall in Westminster. Further suburban growth, stimulated by the improvement and expansion of public transport, as well as the setting up of new industries, led to the creation of Greater London in 1965, an area which included almost all of the historic county of Middlesex, with the rest included in neighbouring ceremonial counties.

== Governance ==
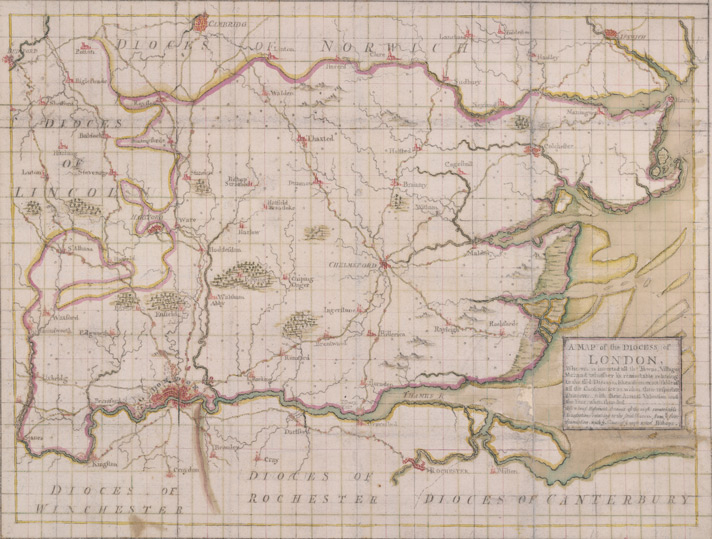
Middlesex as part of the Diocese of London in 1714. The diocese was based on the East Saxon kingdom, and was probably originally larger than shown here.

Map of Middlesex, drawn by Thomas Kitchin, geographer, engraver to the Duke of York, 1769

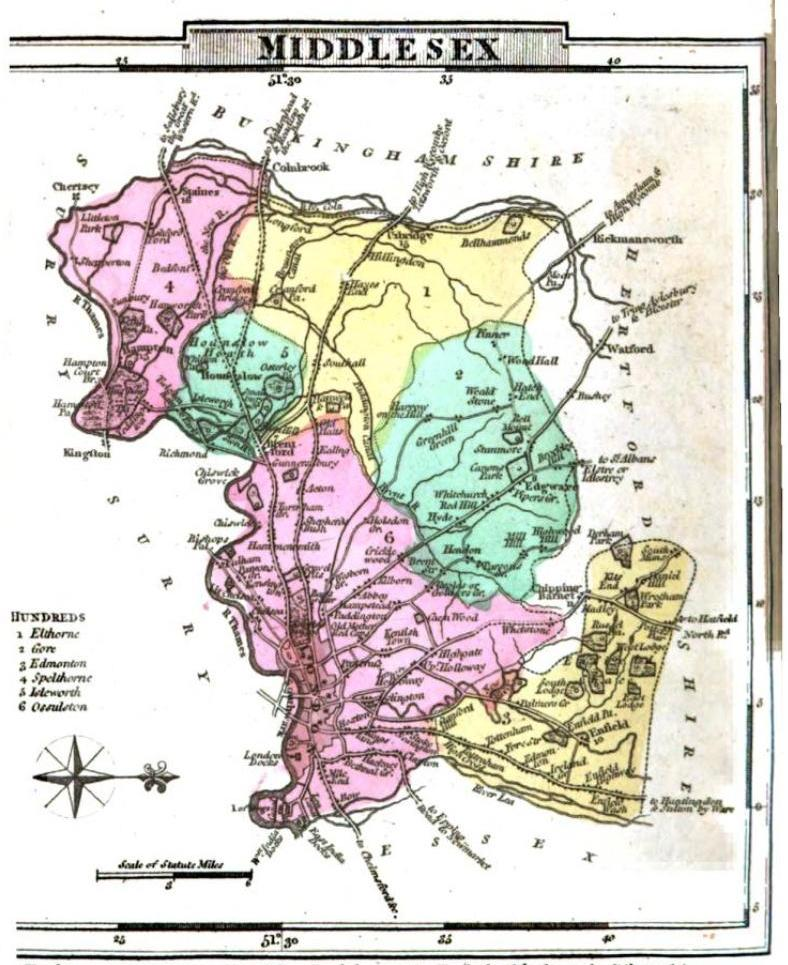
Map of Middlesex, 1824. Note: west is at the top.

=== Origin and toponymy ===
The county has its roots in the settlement of the Middle Saxons. The extent of the province is not clear, and probably varied over time, but it is clear that it occupied at least the area of the current county and much of Hertfordshire. Although the province appeared to have come under the dominion of, and is only ever recorded as a part of the Kingdom of the East Saxons, charter evidence shows that it was not part of their core territory. However, it is probable the county was independent at some point.

At times, Essex was ruled jointly by co-Kings, and it is thought that the Middle Saxon province is likely to have been the domain of one of these co-kings. This link to Essex endured through the Diocese of London, re-established in 604 as the East Saxon see, and its boundaries continued to be based on the Kingdom of Essex until the nineteenth century.

The name means territory of the middle Saxons. The word is formed from the Old English, middel and Seaxe ('Saxons') (cf. Essex, Sussex and Wessex). In 704, it is recorded as Middleseaxon in an Anglo-Saxon chronicle, written in Latin, about land at Twickenham. The Latin text reads: "in prouincia quæ nuncupatur Middelseaxan Haec".

The Saxons derived their name, Seaxe in their own tongue, from the seax, a kind of knife for which they were known. The seax appears in the heraldry of the English counties of Essex and Middlesex, each of which bears three seaxes in their ceremonial emblem, or rather the Tudor heralds' idea of what a seax looked like, portrayed in each case like a falchion or scimitar. The names 'Middlesex', 'Essex', 'Sussex' and 'Wessex', contain the name Seaxe.

=== Early county government ===
It is not known exactly when Middlesex was established as a county, possibly the early tenth century, but it is clear that it did not cover the whole of the former Middle Saxon Province of Essex. It was recorded in the Domesday Book of 1086 as being divided into the six hundreds of Edmonton, Elthorne, Gore, Hounslow (Isleworth in all later records), Ossulstone and Spelthorne. The City of London has been self-governing since the thirteenth century and became a county in its own right, a county corporate. (Note: The City of London continues to be a county distinct from Greater London.) Middlesex also included Westminster, which was separate from the City of London. Westminster Abbey dominated the area of Westminster, until the Dissolution of the Monasteries greatly reduced its influence. A Court of Burgesses was established, in 1585, to fill the power vacuum left behind by the Abbey.

Of the six hundreds, Ossulstone contained the districts closest to the City of London. During the 17th century it was divided into four divisions, which, along with the Liberty of Westminster, largely took over the administrative functions of the hundred. The divisions were named Finsbury, Holborn, Kensington and Tower. The county had parliamentary representation from the 13th century.

Middlesex outside the metropolitan area remained largely rural until the middle of the 19th century and so the special boards of local government for various metropolitan areas were late in developing. Other than the Cities of London and Westminster, there were no ancient boroughs. The importance of the hundred courts declined, and such local administration as there was divided between "county business" conducted by the justices of the peace meeting in quarter sessions, and the local matters dealt with by parish vestries. As the suburbs of London spread into the area, unplanned development and outbreaks of cholera forced the creation of local boards and poor law unions to help govern most areas; in a few cases parishes appointed improvement commissioners. In rural areas, parishes began to be grouped for different administrative purposes. From 1875 these local bodies were designated as urban or rural sanitary districts.

=== Tower Division ===
The Tower Division, better known as the Tower Hamlets, was an area in the south-east of the county covering what is now the London Borough of Tower Hamlets as well as most of what is now the London Borough of Hackney. The territory had its origin in the medieval Manor of Stepney.

The area was unusual in combining Hundred and many County responsibilities, to form a "county within a county" comparable to one of the Ridings of Yorkshire. Of particular note was its military autonomy: it had its own Lord-Lieutenant of the Tower Hamlets and was thus independent of the Lord Lieutenant of Middlesex.

=== Metropolitan challenges ===
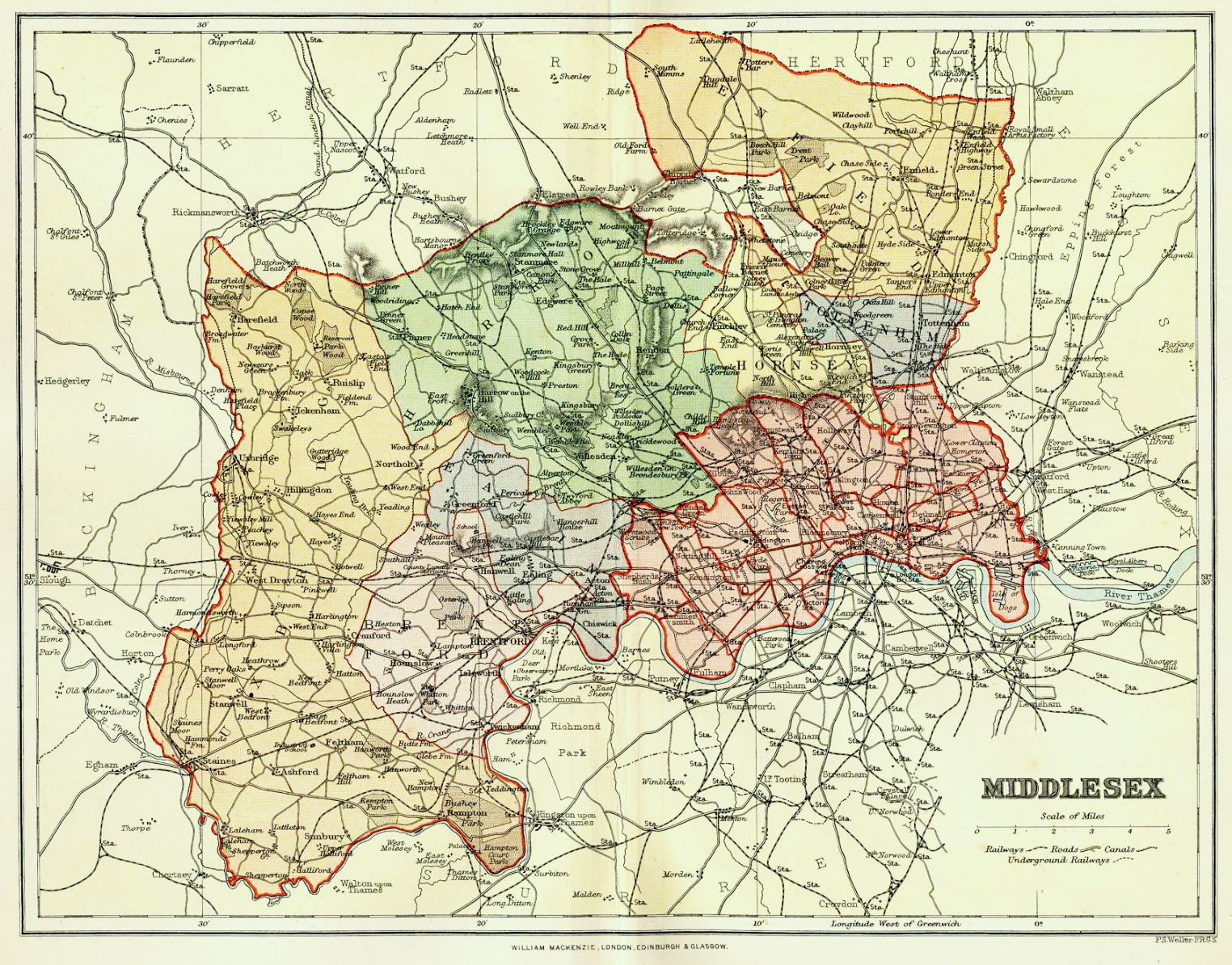
County of Middlesex (c. 1891–1895)

By the 19th century, the East End of London had expanded to the eastern boundary with Essex, and the Tower division, an area which approximated to the East End, had reached a population of over a million. When the railways were built, the north western suburbs of London steadily spread over large parts of the county. The areas closest to London were served by the Metropolitan Police from 1829, and from 1840 the entire county was included in the Metropolitan Police District.

Local government in the county was unaffected by the Municipal Corporations Act 1835, and civic works continued to be the responsibility of the individual parish vestries or ad hoc improvement commissioners. From 1855, the parishes of the densely populated area in the south east, but excluding the City of London, came within the responsibility of the Metropolitan Board of Works for certain infrastructure purposes, though the area remained a part of Middlesex. Despite this innovation, the system was described by commentators at the time as one "in chaos".

=== 1889 – Administrative County of London ===
In 1889, under the Local Government Act 1888, the metropolitan area of approximately 30,000 acres (120 km^{2}) became part of the administrative County of London. The Act also provided that the part of Middlesex in the administrative county of London should be "severed from Middlesex, and form a separate county for all non-administrative purposes".

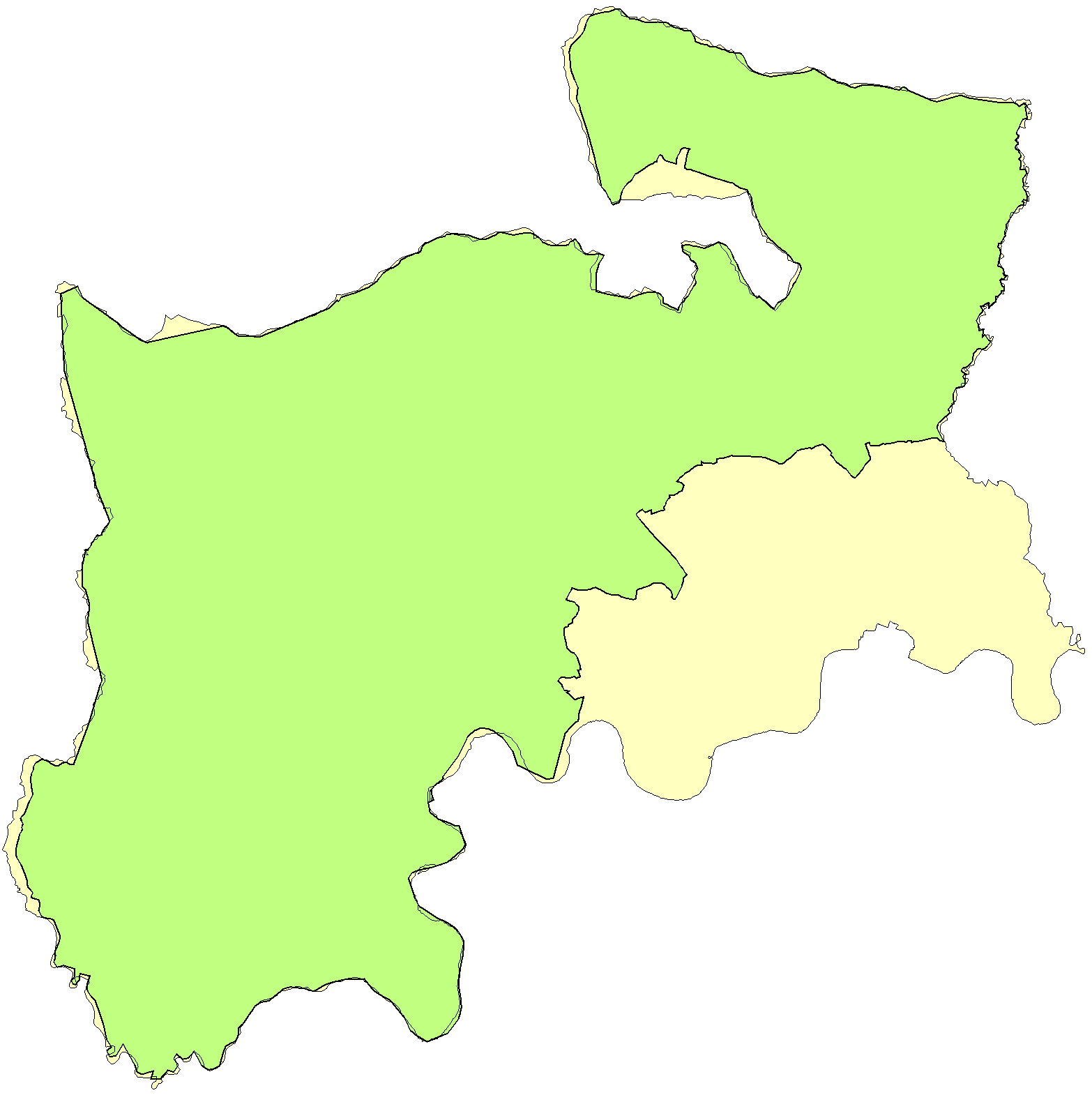
Map showing boundaries of Middlesex in 1851 and 1911, aside from minor realignments. The small yellow area in the North is Monken Hadley, which was transferred to Hertfordshire; the larger yellow area in the Southeast was transferred to the newly created County of London in 1889.

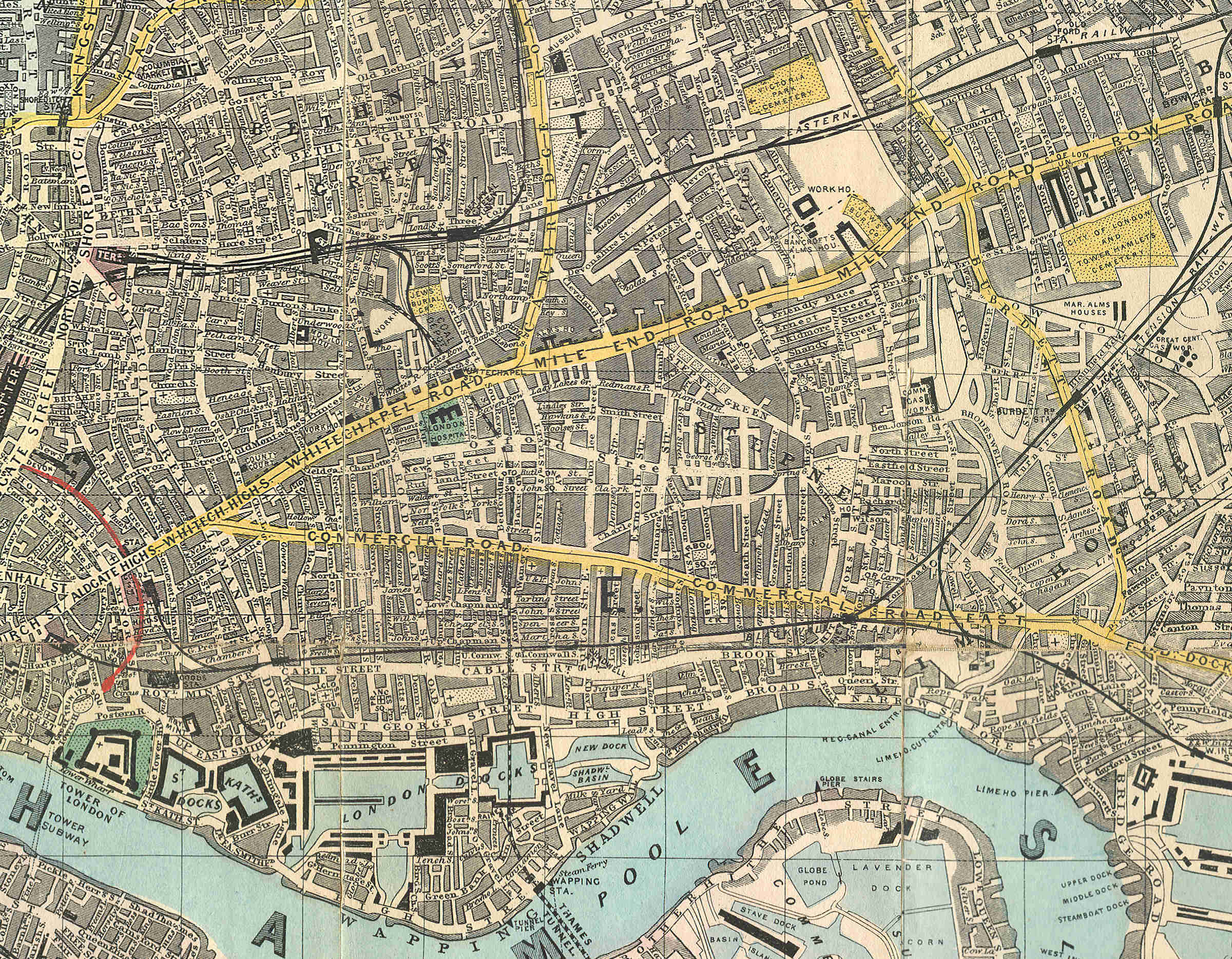
Map in 1882 shows complete urbanisation of the East End

The part of the County of London that had been transferred from Middlesex was divided in 1900 into 18 metropolitan boroughs:

- Bethnal Green
- Chelsea
- Finsbury
- Fulham
- Hackney
- Hammersmith
- Hampstead
- Holborn
- Islington
- Kensington (Royal Borough)
- Paddington
- Poplar
- Shoreditch
- St Marylebone
- St Pancras
- Stepney
- Stoke Newington
- Westminster (City)

=== 1889 – Middlesex County Council ===
Following the Local Government Act 1888, the remaining county came under the control of Middlesex County Council except for the parish of Monken Hadley, which became part of Hertfordshire. The area of responsibility of the Lord Lieutenant of Middlesex was reduced accordingly. Middlesex did not contain any county boroughs, so the county and administrative county (the area of county council control) were identical. At this time, Middlesex regained the right to appoint its own sheriff, lost in the 12th century.

The Local Government Act 1894 divided the administrative county into four rural districts and thirty-one urban districts, based on existing sanitary districts. One urban district, South Hornsey, was an exclave of Middlesex within the County of London until 1900, when it was transferred to the latter county. The rural districts were Hendon, South Mimms, Staines and Uxbridge. Because of increasing urbanisation these had all been abolished by 1934. Urban districts had been created, merged, and many had gained the status of municipal borough by 1965. The districts as at the 1961 census were:

1. Potters Bar; 2. Enfield; 3. Southgate; 4. Edmonton; 5. Tottenham; 6. Wood Green; 7. Friern Barnet; 8. Hornsey; 9. Finchley; 10. Hendon; 11. Harrow; 12. Ruislip-Northwood; 13. Uxbridge	Middlesex urban districts in 1961	14. Ealing; 15. Wembley; 16. Willesden; 17. Acton; 18. Brentford and Chiswick; 19. Heston and Isleworth; 20. Southall; 21. Hayes and Harlington; 22. Yiewsley and West Drayton; 23. Staines; 24. Feltham; 25. Twickenham; 26. Sunbury-on-Thames

After 1889, the growth of London continued, and the county became almost entirely filled by suburbs of London, with a big rise in population density. This process was accelerated by the Metro-land developments, which covered a large part of the county. The expanding urbanisation had, however, been foretold in 1771 by Tobias Smollett in The Expedition of Humphry Clinker, in which it is said:

Pimlico and Knightsbridge are almost joined to Chelsea and Kensington, and, if this infatuation continues for half a century, then, I suppose, the whole county of Middlesex will be covered in brick.

Public transport in the county, including the extensive network of trams, buses and the London Underground came under control of the London Passenger Transport Board in 1933 and a New Works Programme was developed to further enhance services during the 1930s. Partly because of its proximity to the capital, the county had a major role during the Second World War. The county was subject to aerial bombardment and contained military establishments, such as RAF Uxbridge and RAF Heston, which were involved in the Battle of Britain.

=== County town ===
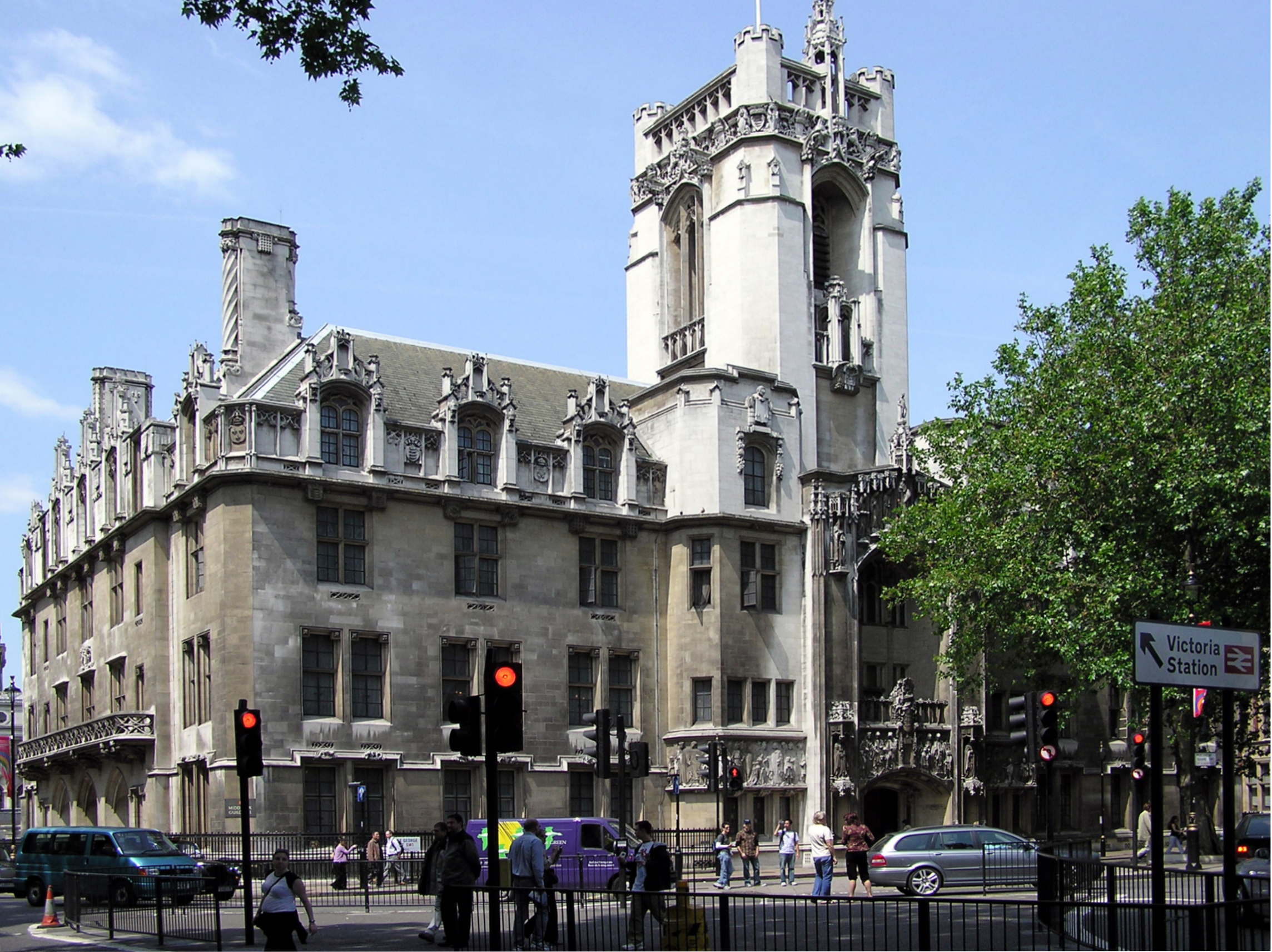
The Middlesex Guildhall at Westminster, which now houses the Supreme Court of the United Kingdom

Middlesex arguably never, and certainly not since 1789, had a single, established county town. The City of London could be regarded as its county town for most purposes and provided different locations for the various, mostly judicial, county purposes. The county assizes for Middlesex were held at the Old Bailey in the City of London. Until 1889, the High Sheriff of Middlesex was chosen by the City of London Corporation. The sessions house for the Middlesex Quarter Sessions was Hicks Hall in Clerkenwell (just outside the City boundary) from 1612 to 1782, and Middlesex Sessions House on Clerkenwell Green from 1782 to 1921. The quarter sessions performed most of the limited administration on a county level prior to the creation of the Middlesex County Council in 1889.

New Brentford was first promulgated as the county town in 1789, on the basis that it was where elections of knights of the shire (or Members of Parliament) were held from 1701. Thus a traveller's and historian's London regional summary of 1795 states that (New) Brentford was "considered as the county-town; but there is no town-hall or other public building". Middlesex County Council took over at the Guildhall in Westminster, which became the Middlesex Guildhall. In the same year, this location was placed into the new County of London, and was thus outside the council's area of jurisdiction.

=== Creation of Greater London ===
The population of inner London (then the County of London) declined after its creation in 1889 as more residents moved into the outer suburbs. In the interwar years, suburban London expanded further, with improvement and expansion of public transport, and the setting up of new industries.

After the Second World War, from 1951 to 1961, the populations of the administrative county of London and of inner Middlesex were in steady decline, with population growth continuing in the outer parts of Middlesex. According to the 1961 census, Ealing, Enfield, Harrow, Hendon, Heston & Isleworth, Tottenham, Wembley, Willesden and Twickenham had each reached a population greater than 100,000, which would normally have entitled each of them to seek county borough status. If this status were to be granted to all those boroughs, it would mean that the population of the administrative county of Middlesex would be reduced by over half, to just under one million.

Evidence submitted to the Royal Commission on Local Government in Greater London (1957–1960) included a recommendation to divide Middlesex into two administrative counties of North Middlesex and West Middlesex. However, the commission instead proposed abolition of the county and merging of the boroughs and districts. This was enacted by Parliament as the London Government Act 1963, which came into force on 1 April 1965.

The Act abolished the administrative counties of Middlesex and London. The Administration of Justice Act 1964 abolished the Middlesex magistracy and lieutenancy, and altered the jurisdiction of the Central Criminal Court.

==== New London boroughs from former London CC area ====
Eighteen of the London County Council Metropolitan Boroughs were part of the ancient county of Middlesex. In 1965 these merged to form seven of the twelve current boroughs of Inner London:

- Camden was formed from the metropolitan boroughs of Hampstead, Holborn and St Pancras.
- Hackney was formed from the metropolitan boroughs of Hackney, Shoreditch and Stoke Newington.
- Hammersmith (known as Hammersmith and Fulham from 1979) was formed from the metropolitan boroughs of Hammersmith and Fulham.
- Islington was formed from the metropolitan boroughs of Finsbury and Islington.
- Kensington and Chelsea was formed from the metropolitan boroughs of Chelsea and Kensington.
- Tower Hamlets was formed from the metropolitan boroughs of Bethnal Green, Poplar and Stepney.
- The City of Westminster was formed from the metropolitan boroughs of Paddington and St Marylebone and the City of Westminster.

==== New London boroughs from former Middlesex CC area ====
In April 1965, nearly all of the area of the historic county of Middlesex became part of Greater London, under the control of the Greater London Council, and formed the new outer London boroughs of Barnet (part only), Brent, Ealing, Enfield, Haringey, Harrow, Hillingdon, Hounslow and Richmond upon Thames (part only).

==== Areas transferred to Surrey and Hertfordshire County Councils ====
The remaining areas were Potters Bar Urban District, which became part of the administrative county of Hertfordshire, and Sunbury-on-Thames Urban District and Staines Urban District, which became part of the administrative county of Surrey. Following the changes, local acts of Parliament relating to Middlesex were henceforth to apply to the entirety of the nine "North West London Boroughs".

In 1974, the three urban districts that had been transferred to Hertfordshire and Surrey were abolished and became the districts of Hertsmere (part only) and Spelthorne respectively. In 1995 the village of Poyle was transferred from Spelthorne to the Berkshire borough of Slough. Additionally, the Greater London boundary to the west and north has been subject to several small changes since 1965.

==== Judicial areas ====
On its creation in 1965, Greater London was divided into five Commission Areas for justice. The one named "Middlesex" consisted of the boroughs of Barnet, Brent, Ealing, Enfield, Haringey, Harrow, Hillingdon and Hounslow. It was abolished on 1 July 2003, when all of the commission areas were merged into one.

== Earldom ==
The title Earl of Middlesex was created twice, in 1622 and 1675, but became extinct in 1843.

== Geography ==
The county lay within the London Basin and the most significant feature was the River Thames, which formed the southern boundary. The River Lea and the River Colne formed natural boundaries to the east and west. The entire south west boundary of Middlesex followed a gently descending meander of the Thames without hills. In many places "Middlesex bank" is more accurate than "north bank" — for instance at Teddington the river flows north-westward, so the left (Middlesex) bank is the south-west bank. (Note: County descriptions are standard in boat races, and the historic county descriptions of the respective sides of the river are still used during the famous University Boat Race and the professional and amateur Head of the River Race.) The largely low-lying county was dominated by clay in its north and alluvium on gravel in its south.

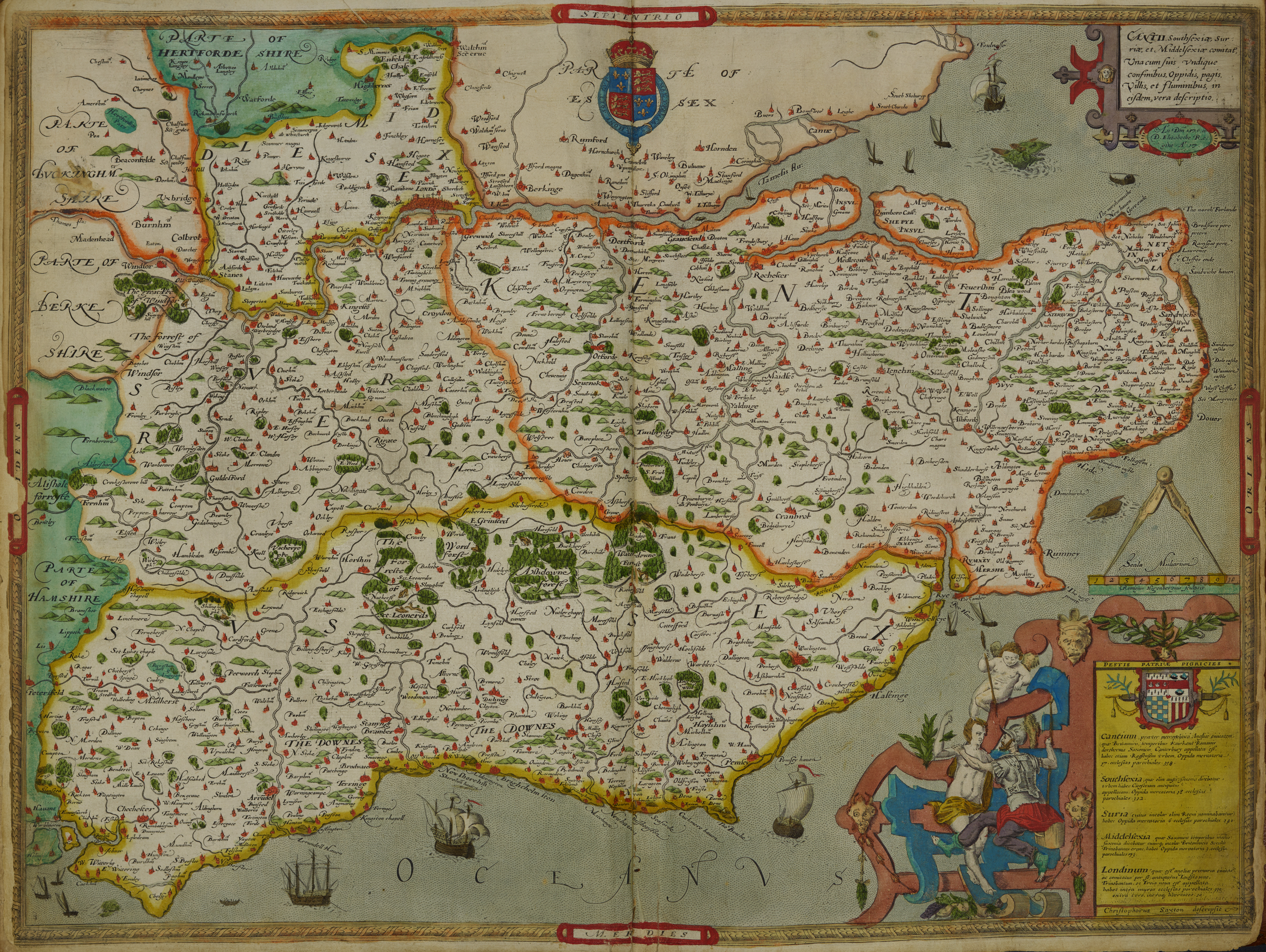
Hand-drawn map of Kent, Sussex, Surrey and Middlesex from 1575

In the north, the boundary ran along a WSW/ENE aligned ridge of hills. From the Colne to Barnet Gate Wood, this boundary is marked by a 20 kilometre hedge of great antiquity. East of the wood the hedge continues but does not form the county boundary, suggesting that the eastern part of the boundary is younger.

After Barnett Gate Wood the hedge continues east to Arkley where it divides into two branches, one continuing east to Chipping Barnet and Cockfosters, with another heading north to form the parish boundary between Shenley and Ridge, both in Hertfordshire. Neither branch formed part of the county boundary. The change to the county boundary was probably caused in the late 8th century, before Middlesex took the form of a county, when the Liberty of St Albans was created from parts of the Dioceses of London and Lincoln.

The hills are broken by Barnet or 'Dollis' valleys. (South of the boundary, these feed into the Welsh Harp Lake or Brent Reservoir which becomes the River Brent). (Note: The Dollis Valley greenwalk follows this steep upper valley of the Dollis Brook.) This formed a long protrusion of Hertfordshire into the county. The county was once well wooded, with much of it covered by the ancient Forest of Middlesex; Domesday returns for Middlesex indicate that it was around 30% wooded (much of it wood-pasture) in 1086, about double the English average. The highest point is the High Road by Bushey Heath at 502 feet (153 m).

Bentley Priory Nature Reserve houses Middlesex's oldest tree: The Master Oak.

== Economic development ==
There were settlements in the area of Middlesex that can be traced back thousands of years before the creation of a county. The economy of the county was dependent on the City of London from early times and was primarily agricultural. A variety of goods were provided for the City, including crops such as grain and hay, livestock and building materials. Tourism began to develop in the late 16th century and, in 1593, John Norden noted that the county was attracting visitors to its "divers devices, neatly decked with rare inventions, environed with orchards of sundry delicate fruits, gardens with delectable walks, arbours, alleys, and great variety of pleasing dainties." Inns and tea gardens at Isleworth, Tottenham, Edmonton and Hornsey are noted in the 17th and 18th centuries for attracting day-trippers from London. Hampton Court Palace was among the historic buildings opened to the public in the 19th century and 350,000 people visited in 1851.

During the 18th century, the inner parishes of Middlesex became suburbs of the City and were increasingly urbanised. In 1794, Thomas Cox wrote of Middlesex:

We may call it almost all London, being chiefly inhabited by the citizens, who fill the towns in it with their country houses, to which they often resort that they may breathe a little sweet air, free from the fogs and smoke of the City.

In 1803, Sir John Sinclair, president of the Board of Agriculture, spoke of the need to cultivate the substantial Finchley Common and Hounslow Heath (perhaps prophetic of the Dig for Victory campaign of World War II) and fellow Board member Middleton estimated that one tenth of the county, 17,000 acres (6,900 ha), was uncultivated common, capable of improvement. However, William Cobbett, in his Rural Rides first serialised in 1822, said that

"A more ugly country between Egham and Kensington would with great difficulty be found in England. Flat as a pancake, and until you come to Hammersmith, the soil is a nasty, stony dirt upon a bed of gravel. Hounslow Heath which is only a little worse than the general run, is a sample of all that is bad in soil and villainous in look. Yet this is now enclosed, and what they call 'cultivated'. Here is a fresh robbery of villages, hamlets, and farm and labourers' buildings and abodes."

Thomas Babington wrote in 1843, "An acre in Middlesex is worth a principality in Utopia" which contrasts neatly with its agricultural description.

The building of radial railway lines from 1839 caused a fundamental shift away from agricultural supply for London towards large scale house building. Tottenham, Edmonton and Enfield in the north developed first as working-class residential suburbs with easy access to central London. The line to Windsor through Middlesex was completed in 1848, and the railway to Potters Bar in 1850; and the Metropolitan and District Railways started a series of extensions into the county in 1878. Closer to London, the districts of Acton, Willesden, Ealing and Hornsey came within reach of the tram and bus networks, providing cheap transport to central London.

After World War I, the availability of labour and proximity to London made areas such as Hayes and Park Royal ideal locations for the developing new industries. New jobs attracted more people to the county and the population continued to rise, reaching a peak in 1951. Middlesex became the location of facilities for the film industry. Twickenham Studios were established in 1913. There were also studios at Cricklewood Studios, Gainsborough Pictures, Isleworth Studios, Kew Bridge Studios and Southall Studios.

== Former postal county ==
Middlesex (abbreviated Middx) is a former postal county. Counties were an element of postal addressing in routine use until 1996, intended to avoid confusion between post towns, and are no longer required for the routing of the mail. The postal county did not match the boundaries of Middlesex because of the presence of the London postal district, which stretched into the county to include Tottenham, Willesden, Hornsey and Chiswick. Addresses in this area included "LONDON" which is the post town but any overlap with the then County of London was coincidental.

In 1965, Royal Mail retained the postal county because it would have been too costly to amend addresses covering the bulk of Outer London. Exceptionally, the Potters Bar post town was transferred to Hertfordshire. Geographically the postal county consisted of two unconnected areas, 6 miles (10 km) apart. The first was in and around Enfield and the second, larger area was to the west. This led the retention of 25 Post Towns to this day:

Postcode area	Post towns
EN (part)	ENFIELD; POTTERS BAR (until 1965)
HA	EDGWARE, HARROW, NORTHWOOD, PINNER, RUISLIP, STANMORE, WEMBLEY
TW (part)	ASHFORD, BRENTFORD, FELTHAM, HAMPTON, HOUNSLOW†, ISLEWORTH, SHEPPERTON, STAINES, SUNBURY-ON-THAMES, TEDDINGTON, TWICKENHAM†
UB	GREENFORD, HAYES, NORTHOLT, SOUTHALL, UXBRIDGE, WEST DRAYTON

† = postal county was not required

The postal county had many border inconsistencies where its constituent post towns encroached on neighbouring counties, such as the villages of Denham in Buckinghamshire, Wraysbury in Berkshire and Eastbury in Hertfordshire which were respectively in the post towns of Uxbridge, Staines and Northwood and therefore in the postal county of Middlesex. Egham Hythe, Surrey also had postal addresses of Staines, Middlesex. Conversely, Hampton Wick was conveniently placed in Kingston, Surrey with its sorting offices just across the river. Nearby Hampton Court Palace has a postal address of East Molesey, therefore associating it with Surrey.

Middlesex former postal county

The Enfield post town in the EN postcode area was in the former postal county. All post towns in the HA postcode area and UB postcode area were in the former postal county. Most of the TW postcode area was in the former postal county.

== Culture and community ==
=== Flag and coat of arms ===
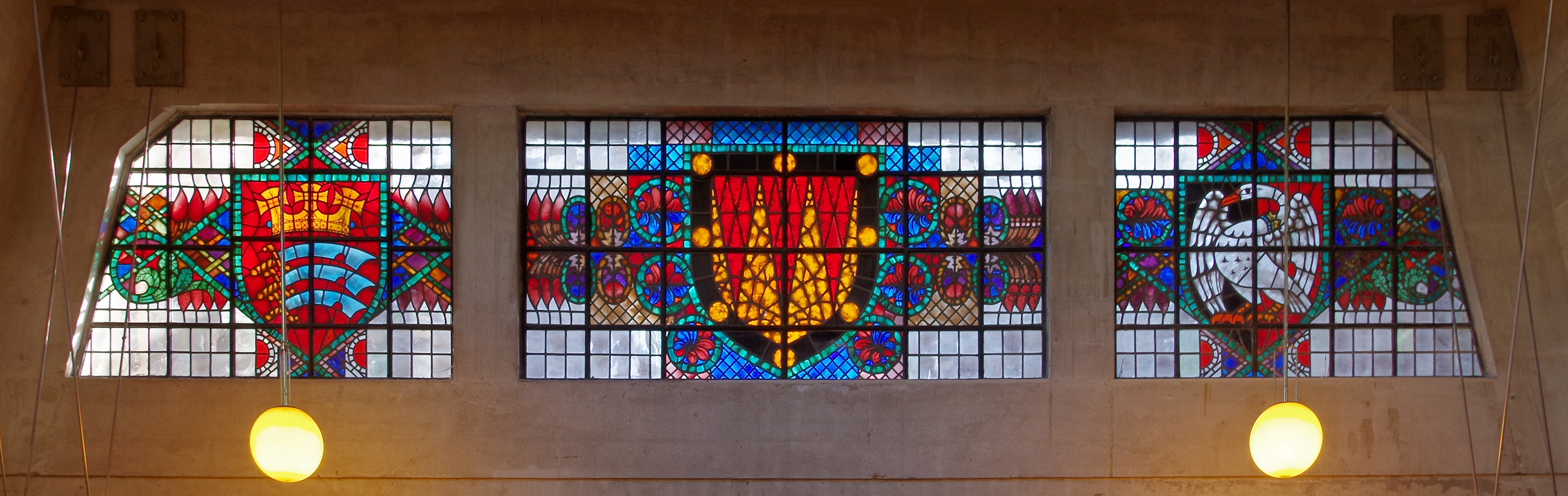
Coats of arms of Middlesex (left) and Buckinghamshire (right) in stained glass at the exit from Uxbridge tube station

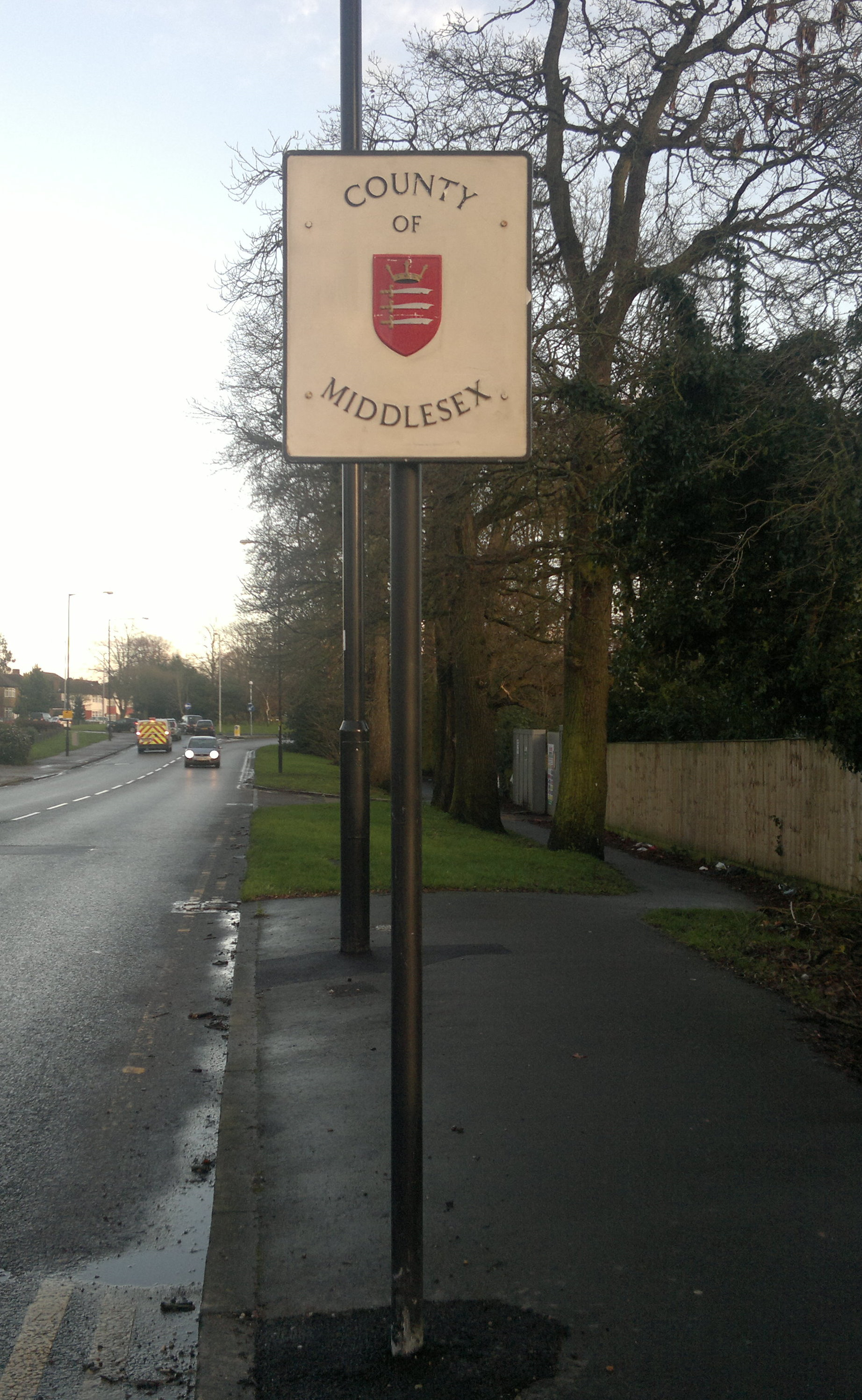
County of Middlesex sign in 2014, on the border between the London Boroughs of Barnet and Enfield

Coats of arms were attributed by the mediaeval heralds to the kingdoms of the Anglo-Saxon Heptarchy. That assigned to the Kingdom of Essex, of which the Middle Saxon Province was part, depicted three "seaxes" or short notched swords on a red background. The seaxe was a weapon carried by Anglo-Saxon warriors, and the term "Saxon" may be derived from the word. These arms became associated with the two counties that approximated to the kingdom: Middlesex and Essex. County authorities, militia and volunteer regiments associated with both counties used the attributed arms.

In 1910, it was observed that the county councils of Essex and Middlesex and the Sheriff's Office of the County of London were all using the same arms. Middlesex County Council decided to apply for a formal grant of arms from the College of Arms, with the addition of a heraldic "difference" to the attributed arms. Colonel Otley Parry, a justice of the peace for Middlesex and author of a book on military badges, was asked to devise an addition to the shield. The chosen addition was a "Saxon Crown", derived from the portrait of King Athelstan on a silver penny of his reign, stated to be the earliest form of crown associated with any English sovereign. The grant of arms was made by letters patent dated 7 November 1910.

Arms of the Middlesex County Council	The arms of the Middlesex County Council were blazoned: Gules, three seaxes fessewise points to the sinister proper, pomels and hilts and in the centre chief point a Saxon crown or.

The undifferenced arms of the kingdom were eventually granted to Essex County Council in 1932. Seaxes were also used in the insignia of many of the boroughs and urban districts in the county, while the Saxon crown came to be a common heraldic charge in English civic arms. On the creation of the Greater London Council in 1965 a Saxon crown was introduced in its coat of arms. Seaxes appear in the arms of several London borough councils and of Spelthorne Borough Council.

The Middlesex Flag is included in the Flag Institute's registry of county and regional flags. The flag is a banner of the arms of the former Middlesex County Council, abolished in 1965. A similar design had been used traditionally as a local badge in Middlesex and neighbouring Essex for centuries.

=== Military units ===
As well as the ancient county fyrd and militia, Middlesex military units have included the Middlesex Regiment, the Middlesex Yeomanry and their predecessors.

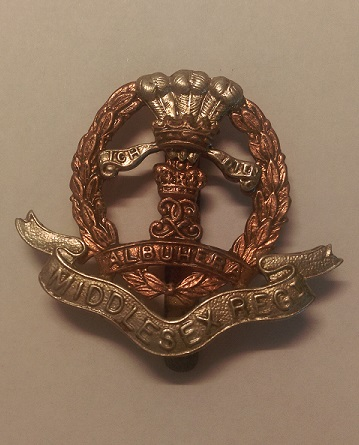
Middlesex Regiment Cap Badge

In the south-east, the Tower Division, effectively a separate county, had its own military arrangements.

=== County day ===
Middlesex Day is celebrated each year on 16 May. This commemorates the actions of the 57th (West Middlesex) Regiment in 1811, at the Battle of Albuera, during the Peninsular War. During the battle, Lieutenant-Colonel William Inglis, despite his injuries, refused to retire from the battle but remained with the regimental colours, encouraging his men with the words "Die hard 57th, die hard!" as they came under intense pressure from a French attack. The regiment held and the battle was won. The 'Die Hards' subsequently became the West Middlesex's regimental nickname and the phrase Die Hard entered the language. In 2003, an early day motion in the House of Commons noted the celebration of 16 May, the anniversary of Albuhera, as Middlesex Day.

=== County flower ===
In 2002 Plantlife ran a county flowers campaign to assign flowers to each of the counties of the United Kingdom. The general public was invited to vote for the bloom they felt most represented their county. The wood anemone was chosen as the flower of Middlesex. The flower was a common sight in the Forest of Middlesex.

When the suburbs of London swept over Middlesex, many of its woods were bypassed and preserved. The wood anemone still blooms there to this day.

=== County history societies ===
The London and Middlesex Archaeological Society (LAMAS) was founded in 1855 for the study of the archaeology and local history of the City of London and the county of Middlesex. It works in close association with the London Museum and with the Museum of London Archaeology. It has over 40 affiliated local history societies in Middlesex.

The interests of family historians in Middlesex are supported by two member organisations of the Federation of Family History Societies: The London, Westminster and Middlesex Family History Society and the West Middlesex Family History Society. For genealogical research Middlesex is assigned Chapman code MDX, except for the City of London ("square mile") assigned LND.

=== Literature ===
Sir John Betjeman, Poet Laureate from 1972 until his death in 1984, was born in 1906 in Gospel Oak and grew up in Highgate. He published several poems about Middlesex and suburban life. Many were featured in the televised readings Metroland.

Dear Middlesex, dear vanished country friend,
Your neighbour, London, killed you in the end.

— Contrasts: Marble Arch to Edgware – A Lament, John Betjeman (1968)

== Sport ==
Middlesex continues to be used as a geographic frame of reference by a number of sporting associations.

=== Rugby union ===
Seven rugby union clubs at national league levels 1 to 4 have some or all of their other teams playing in Middlesex leagues (those marked * having grounds in Middlesex). These are Harlequins*, Saracens*, London Scottish, London Irish*, Richmond, Ealing Trailfinders*, and Barnes.

Middlesex Rugby is the governing body for rugby union in Middlesex. The union selects players from its 88 affiliated clubs for the Middlesex team in the County Championship. It runs the Middlesex RFU Senior Cup open to the top 8 Middlesex clubs that play between tiers 6–7 of the English rugby union system. It also runs the Middlesex RFU Senior Bowl and the Middlesex RFU Senior Vase for sides from lower down the pyramid. It helps run the Herts/Middlesex 1 (tier 9) and Herts/Middlesex 2 (tier 10) leagues. Middlesex Rugby is also active in promoting youth rugby and women's rugby in the county.

=== Football ===
The Middlesex County Football Association regulates and promotes football in the county. The Middlesex F.A. organises many cup competitions, the most prestigious being the Middlesex Senior Cup (founded in 1889) and the Middlesex Senior Charity Cup (founded in 1901).

The Middlesex County Football League was founded in 1984 and currently comprises 5 divisions. The premier divisions sits at level 7 of the National League System.

=== Cricket ===
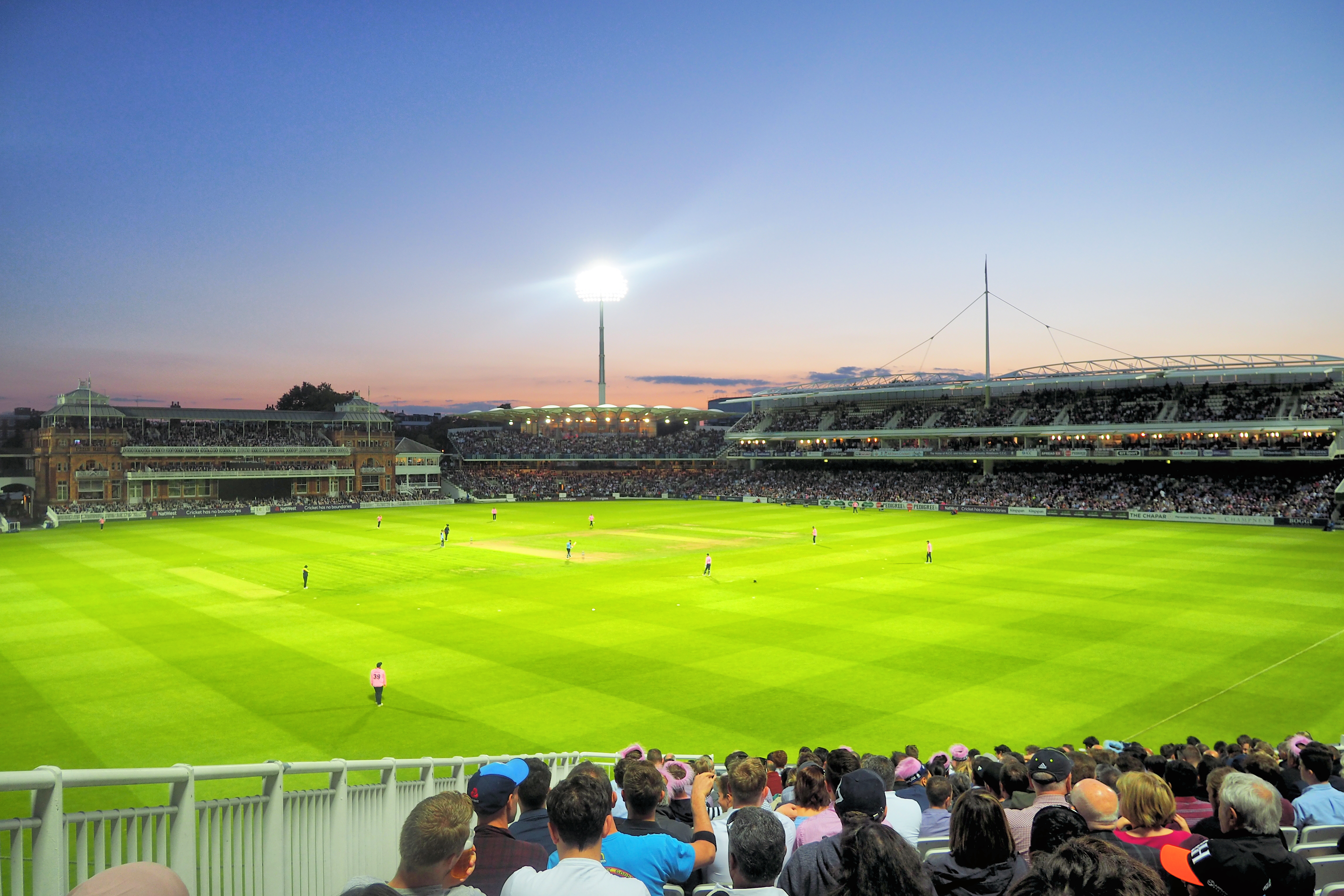
Middlesex vs Sussex at Lord's

Middlesex County Cricket Club is one of eighteen first-class county clubs within the domestic cricket structure of England and Wales. The club was founded in 1864 but teams representing the county have played top-class cricket since the early 18th century and the club has always held first-class status. Middlesex have won thirteen County Championship titles (including 2 shared titles), the most recent in 2016.

The Middlesex Cricket Board is the governing body of all recreational cricket in Middlesex.

The Middlesex County Cricket League is the top-level competition for all recreational club cricket in the county. The League now consists of twenty-two divisions in total. The top division has been designated an ECB Premier League.

=== Other sports ===
Middlesex Bowling Association has over 80 affiliated clubs throughout the county.

Middlesex County Amateur Swimming Association organises training, competitions and representative county teams in swimming, diving, water polo and synchronised swimming.

Middlesex County Athletics Association is the organisation controlling Amateur Athletics in Middlesex under the direction of UK Athletics.

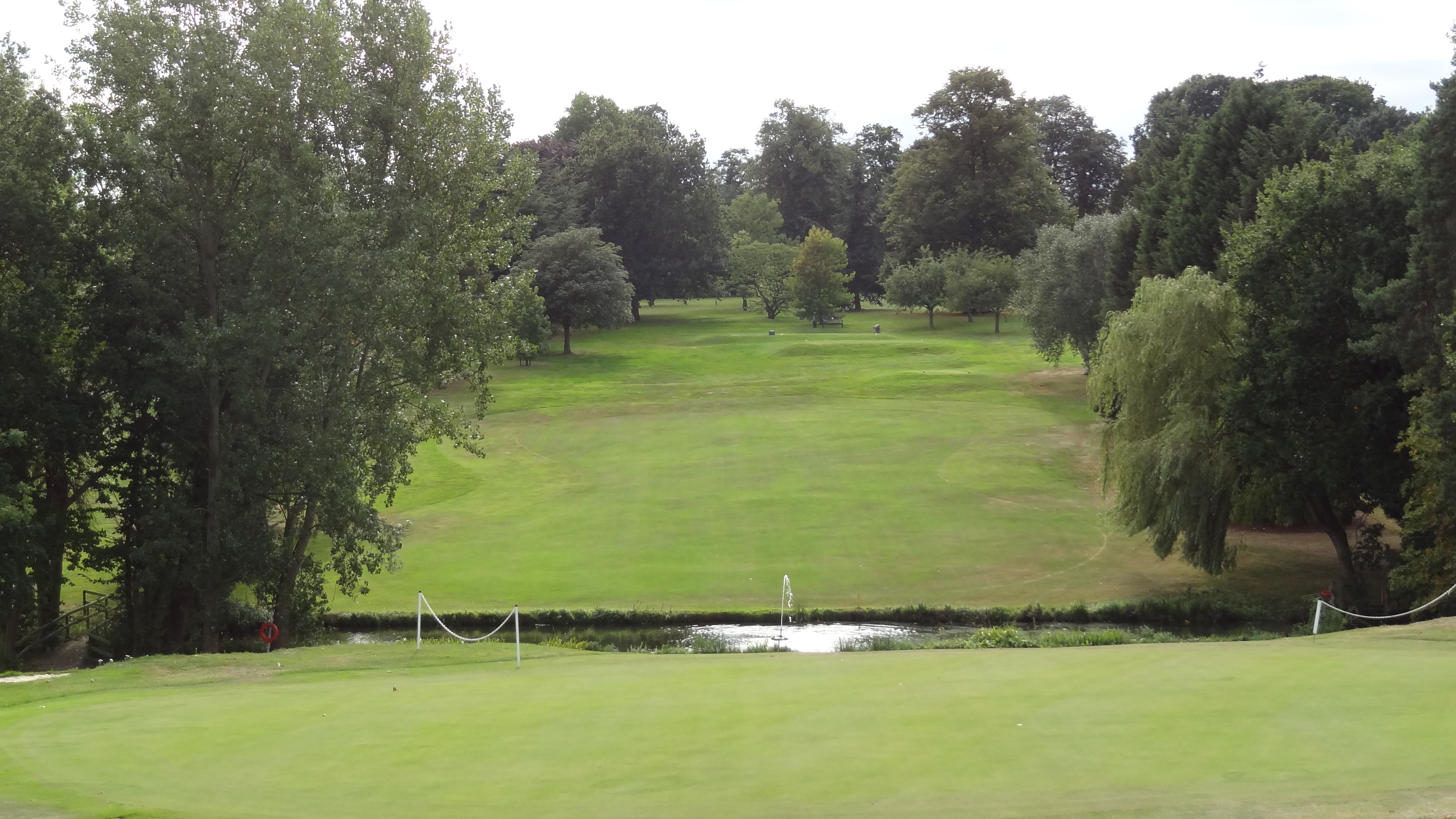
North Middlesex Golf Club

Middlesex Golf represents all aspects of golf within the county. It has 33 affiliated golf clubs.

Middlesex Tennis, affiliated to the LTA, works to create more opportunities for people in Middlesex to play and compete in tennis at all levels of the game. The Middlesex County Championships are the highlight of Middlesex's Competition Calendar.

Middlesex County Badminton Association has over 80 affiliated clubs and organises men's, ladies' and mixed leagues.

Middlesex Squash & Racketball Association is responsible for organising and promoting squash in Middlesex. It was founded in the 1930s and ran the first Middlesex Open Championships in 1937.

Middlesex County Archery Association is the governing body for the sport of archery in the county.

Middlesex Small-Bore Rifle Association brings together small-bore rifle and airgun clubs in the county, and organises teams to represent the County in competitions.

Middlesex County Chess Association aims to foster chess throughout Middlesex. It has 15 affiliated clubs.

Middlesex County Bridge Association runs the Middlesex Cup and the Middlesex League and enters county teams in national and regional competitions.

== See also ==
- List of Lord Lieutenants of Middlesex
- Custos Rotulorum of Middlesex – List of Keepers of the Rolls
- List of English and Welsh endowed schools (19th century)#Middlesex
- List of High Sheriffs of Middlesex
- Middlesex (UK Parliament constituency) – Historical list of MPs for the Middlesex constituency
