= Sunbury-on-Thames Urban District =

Former local government area in the UK

Coordinates: 51.41°N 0.43°W

Sunbury on Thames
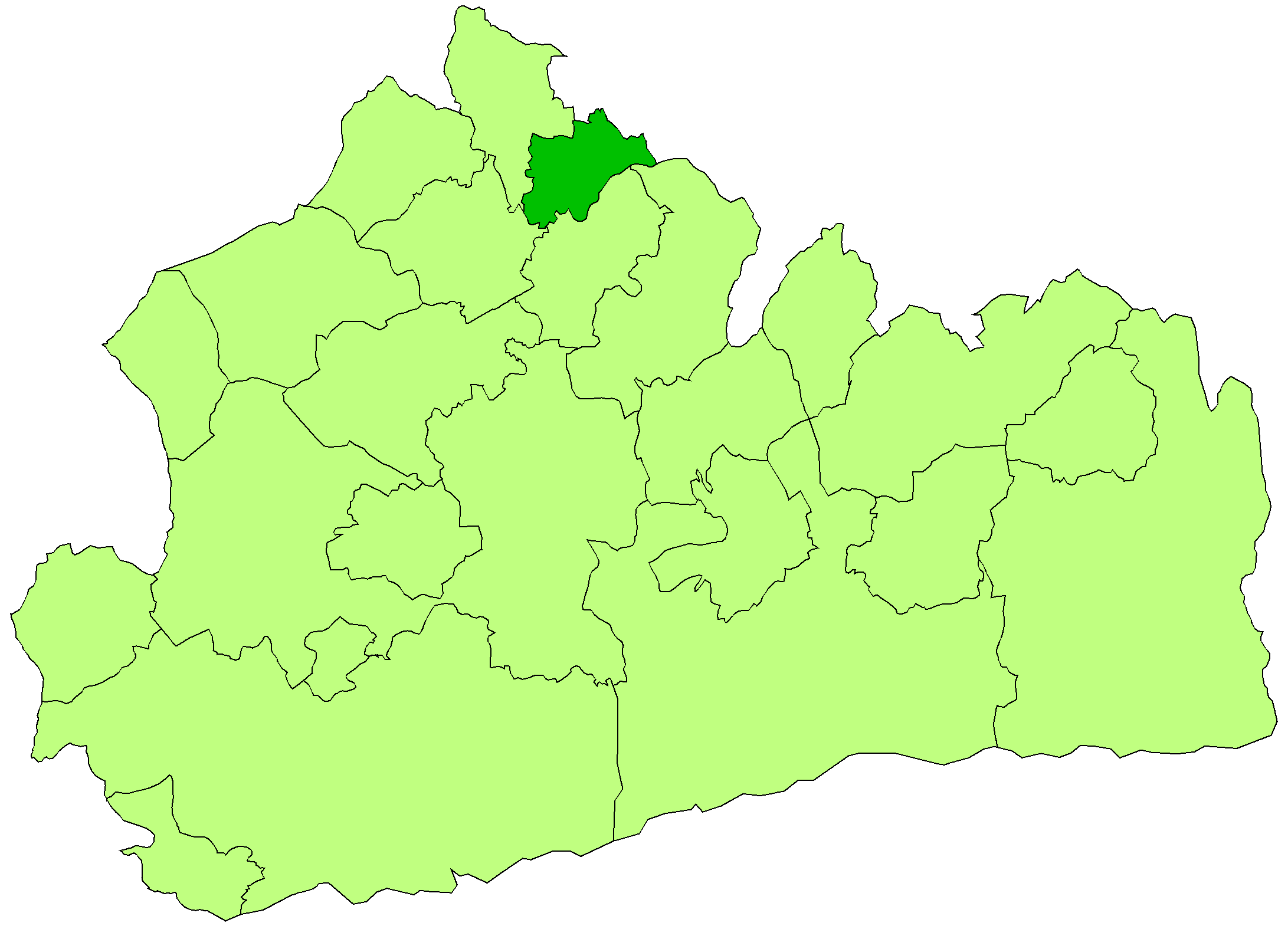
- Sunbury-on-Thames 1965–1974
- Area
  - 1894: 2,659 acres (10.8 km^{2})
  - 1974: 5,609 acres (22.7 km^{2})
- Population
  - 1901: 4,544
  - 1971: 40,179
- History
  - Created: 1894
  - Abolished: 1974
  - Succeeded by: Spelthorne
- Status: Urban district
- Government
  - HQ: Poor Law institute and at the Assembly Rooms (during 1895) from 1895: Church Villa from 1930: Benwell House; Sunbury-on-Thames
  - Motto: Sol et Pastor Deus (God is my Sun and Shepherd)

Sunbury on Thames Urban District, also known as Sunbury Urban District, was a local government district from 1894 to 1974 comprising the town and parish (Note: Civil parish and from 1880, overlapping two ecclesiastical parishes, Upper Sunbury and Sunbury) of Sunbury-on-Thames and from 1930 also the parishes of Littleton and Shepperton.

== Background and boundaries ==
In 1894, under the Local Government Act 1894, Sunbury on Thames was created an urban district of the administrative county of Middlesex. It adopted planning, lighting and sanitary responsibilities. For 36 years it covered just the parish of Sunbury, which still includes the hamlets (colloquially villages) of Charlton and Upper Halliford but gained the parishes of Shepperton and Littleton in 1930 on the abolition of the Staines Rural District.

Sunbury U.D. in Middlesex 1930–1965 (rest of county as at 1931)

== Members and programmes ==
By 1795 the parish had a fire engine for which a keeper and assistant keeper were appointed. Before 1859 the beadle looked after it and from that year to 1879 the overseer was responsible. A volunteer brigade was proposed in 1879, and had been formed by 1895, when it was decided to hand the engine over to the newly formed urban district council. The vestry agreed to sell the old parish cage or round house in 1859. In 1860 the old part of the Cemetery was opened by public subscription, in 1873 a public meeting was held to discuss the management of the greens, and in 1874 committees were appointed for telegraphic communications and for lighting. In or before 1879 part of the parish was made a lighting district. Serious agitation for better drainage began in 1890, and in 1892 the vestry decided to press for urban status. A parochial committee was formed in the same year using the Public Health Act 1875. At a local inquiry which was held in 1893 it was said that middle-class property in the parish was depreciating because of the Staines rural sanitary authority's apathy about drainage. The latter was not represented at the inquiry and there was no opposition to the proposed urban district, which was created in the following year.

The council had 12 members until 1930, when it was increased to 17 on the addition of Shepperton and Littleton parishes. By 1957 it had been further increased to 20. In 1931 all the councillors were independents and from World War II until its demise the councillors were predominantly Conservative. During the first few years the council met twice monthly, but in the few years to 1957 it met thirteen times a year. The first meeting, in January 1895, was held at the Institute. Thereafter the council met at the Assembly Rooms in Thames Street until it acquired the lease of Church Villa later in 1895. By 1930 the building was too small and a temporary one was erected in the grounds. The house known as Benwell, which now contains the council offices, was purchased in 1932. Church Villa was bought by the council after 1929 and was used as a fire station until the early 1960s. Since World War II additional office buildings were put up in the grounds. In 1895 one person was appointed surveyor and inspector of nuisances, a collector and medical officer were appointed, and the vestry clerk was made clerk to the council. In 1957 there were five chief officers, including the joint post of public health inspector and chief housing officer, and there was an administrative staff of 48. The council's own expenditure within the district rose from £7,152 in 1906-7 (equivalent to £971,700 in 2023) to £293,872 in 1956-7 (equivalent to £8,949,336 in 2023). In 1896 there were committees for finance, highways and lighting, by-laws, fire brigade, Church Green improvement, sanitary and general purposes, and drainage. The last comprised the whole council and a sewerage scheme absorbed much attention at first. The 'new cemetery' was provided in 1900. By 1957 the council had built 1,570 houses and flats, of which 996 were in the old parish rather than in Shepperton or Littleton.

== Coat of arms ==
The district was granted a coat of arms in November 1948. It is described as: Per fess Or and argent on a fess Vert between in chief two shepherd's crooks in saltire and in base as many bars wavy azure a mitre between two Saxon crowns of the first. The crest is: On a wreath argent and vert in front of a sun rising Or a seax (Saxon sword) fesswise point to the dexter azure hilted gules. The motto is Latin for "God is my sun and shepherd".

The shepherd's crooks stand for Shepperton, and the mitre for Sunbury-on-Thames, the two main towns in the district. The motto is a pun on the prefixes of the two towns (Sunbury and Shepperton).

== Successor ==
The Royal Commission on Local Government in Greater London recommended the district for inclusion for the new administrative county of Greater London. Under the London Government Act 1963, the bulk of Middlesex contributed to Greater London from 1965, but Sunbury on Thames Urban District joined two others in a transfer to a neighbouring administrative county, in this case Surrey. (Note: The other two districts transferred were Staines Urban District and Potters Bar Urban District, respectively to Surrey and Hertfordshire.)

In 1974, under the Local Government Act 1972, the urban district was abolished and its former area was combined with that of Staines Urban District to form the present-day borough of Spelthorne.

== See also ==
- Middlesex County Council
- Surrey County Council
- Sanitary districts
