= Edwin Herbert, Baron Tangley =

British lawyer and mountaineer (1899–1973)

The Right Honourable The Lord Tangley KBE
- Herbert in 1949
- Born: 29 June 1899; Egham, Surrey
- Died: 5 June 1973 (aged 73); St George's Hospital, London
- Occupations: solicitor and mountaineer
- Honours: KBE

Edwin Savory Herbert, Baron Tangley, KBE (29 June 1899 – 5 June 1973) was a British solicitor and mountaineer.

== Life and career ==
The son (one of five children) of Henry William Herbert, a chemist, and his wife Harriett Lizzie (née Elmes), of Egham, Surrey, Herbert was educated at Queen's College, Taunton and the Law Society's Law School, from which he received his LL.B.

Herbert served as director of postal and telegraph censorship for the Ministry of Information during the Second World War. He was elected President of the Law Society in 1956.

A Knight Bachelor in 1943, Herbert was appointed a Knight Commander of the Order of the British Empire (KBE) in the 1956 Birthday Honours. He was also awarded the American Medal for Merit and the Norwegian King Haakon's liberty cross.

He was created a life peer as Baron Tangley, of Blackheath in the County of Surrey on 22 January 1964. This was in recognition of his work on the Royal Commission on Local Government in Greater London. The area that was to become what is now known as Greater London was controlled by the London, Surrey, Essex, Kent and Middlesex County Councils and a number of County Boroughs. The result was that the London and Middlesex County Councils and County Boroughs disappeared, and the areas covered by Essex and Surrey were reduced.

The Greater London Council was established as the strategic authority, with broad town planning and transport powers; below it were the City of London, basically covering the area it had always controlled, and thirty two new London Boroughs. They provided local town planning powers, local highways and inter alia social and housing powers. The GLC took over running the council housing that the London County Council had controlled.

Herbert introduced Thomas Graham Brown to Frank Smythe in 1927. Herbert and Brown later climbed the Brenva face of Mont Blanc. Herbert was President of the Alpine Club from 1953 to 1956 and he chaired the Everest committee when the world's highest peak was scaled for the first time.

He held honorary LLD degrees from Montreal (1956) and Leeds (1960). In 1969 he became an honorary fellow of Darwin College, Cambridge, and an honorary LLD of the university.

Herbert married Gwendoline Judd in 1932; they had a son and three daughters. His eldest daughter, Dr Hon. Elizabeth Ann Herbert, M.A. B.Ch., married Michael Cottrell Brain, 3rd Baron Brain, in 1960.

== Arms ==
Coat of arms of Edwin Herbert, Baron Tangley
Coronet The coronet of a Baron Crest A demi-lion affronté Azure, resting the forepaws on a ship's steering wheel Or Escutcheon Paly of six Or and Vert, three piles reversed Argent, on a chief of the last as many lions rampant Azure Supporters Dexter, a badger Proper Sinister, a roe deer Proper Motto Levavi Oculos ("I will lift up my eyes") Orders The Order of the British Empire circlet
