= Staines Rural District =

Former local government area in the UK

Coordinates: 51.45°N 0.47°W

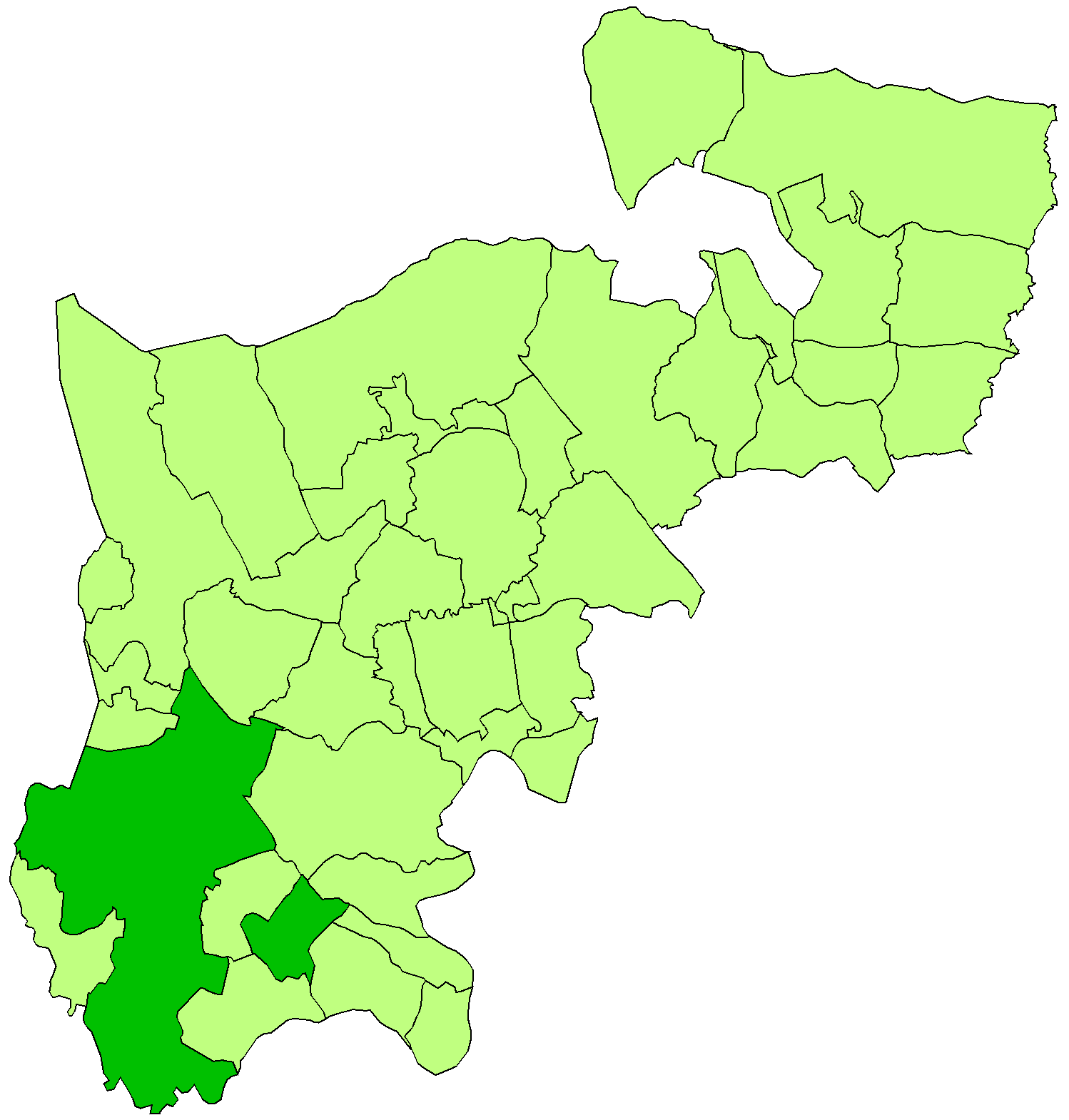
- Staines Rural District within Middlesex in 1911 (boundaries apply approximately 1904-1930)
- History
  - Created: 1894
  - Abolished: 1930
- Status: Rural district
- Government: Staines Rural District Council

Staines Rural District was a rural district of Middlesex in England from 1894 to 1930.

It was created in 1894 replacing the 1875-created Staines rural sanitary district. It co-governed with varying degrees of input from the civil parish councils and functions increasingly came to be carried out by the newly created Middlesex County Council from 1888:

- Ashford
- Cranford
- East Bedfont also known as Bedfont
- Feltham
- Hanworth
- Harlington
- Harmondsworth
- Laleham
- Littleton
- Shepperton
- Stanwell (including until 1990 a very small part of Colnbrook with Poyle).
- Hanworth

It was named after Staines, the urban district of which bordered it to the west, and bordered that of Sunbury to the south-east. Feltham became an independent urban district in 1904 so for the following 26 years the parish of Hanworth was an exclave of the district surrounded by five Urban Districts. The rural district was divided up among existing urban districts in 1930. It covered over half of medieval Spelthorne Hundred one of six divisions of the historic county Middlesex.

== Staines Rural Sanitary District ==
Sunbury-on-Thames and Staines civil parishes in the former Sanitary District saw the Staines Rural Sanitary District's very slow progress in installing drainage as backward. Indeed, the ineffective taxation and implementation of many such bodies was one of the main prompts for members of Parliament supporting the Local Government Act 1894, which introduced a second tier of local government six years after the deemed success of the administrative county introduction in 1888. Rate-raising and well-managed foul sewer and surface water drain construction was swift in the two Urban Districts and in the Rural District from 1894.

== Example of constraints ==
Until 1930 the separation of church and state was gradual in this District as this extract from an account of Stanwell's local government history shows:

[From] 1836 the [Stanwell] vestry continued to meet, generally with the vicar presiding, to elect parish officers and raise rates. Its burial board was formed in 1892 and a cemetery was opened in 1895. In the same year a (civil) parish council of nine members was formed. Contested elections for this were very rare. The longest tenure of the chair was that of Sir Alexander Gibbons in 1922–30. The vicar never sat on the council but often presided at the annual parish meetings. The whole council constituted a burial board and churchyard committee; it also had a finance committee, on which latterly all the members sat. The council was an active one; it intervened with partial success in the negotiations for the building of the reservoirs and was concerned in the provision of allotments in 1918 and of a recreation ground in 1927. Its first complaint about dangerous driving along the London Road was made in 1909. In addition to the overseer, who was unpaid, the council had two salaried assistant overseers, one of whom was also clerk to the council and the other of whom was the rate collector. The council protested against the inclusion of Stanwell in Staines urban district, which nevertheless took place in 1930, so that the council was dissolved. In 1905 gas street-lighting was provided in Poyle. An annual meeting [its] inhabitants thereafter raised the necessary rates while the parish council administered the lighting. Lighting was given up in 1914 and not resumed until electric lighting was provided for the parish as a whole in 1926.

== Successors ==
=== Immediate ===
The district was abolished in 1930 when its civil parishes were re-allocated as follows:

Parishes	Successor as parent District	Notes
Ashford, Laleham and Stanwell	Staines U.D.	Large reservoirs in Stanwell in construction/built.
Littleton and Shepperton	Sunbury U.D.	Large reservoir in Littleton in construction/built.
East Bedfont and Hanworth	Feltham U.D.	Opposite sides of town itself.
Harlington	Hayes and Harlington U.D.	Until transfer known as Hayes U.D.
Cranford	Hayes and Harlington U.D.	Half remaining there 1934 on its abolition, half given to Heston and Isleworth U.D.
Harmondsworth	Yiewsley and West Drayton U.D.	Large airport soon in construction.

=== From 1 April 1965 ===
- Feltham, Hanworth, Cranford (east), (East) Bedfont: London Borough of Hounslow
- Within Stanwell the former manor of Poyle: Borough of Slough
- Harlington (including former west Cranford) and Harmondsworth: London Borough of Hillingdon
- Remainder: Borough of Spelthorne in Surrey
