= Staines Urban District =

Former local government district in England

Coordinates: 51.44°N 0.51°W

Staines
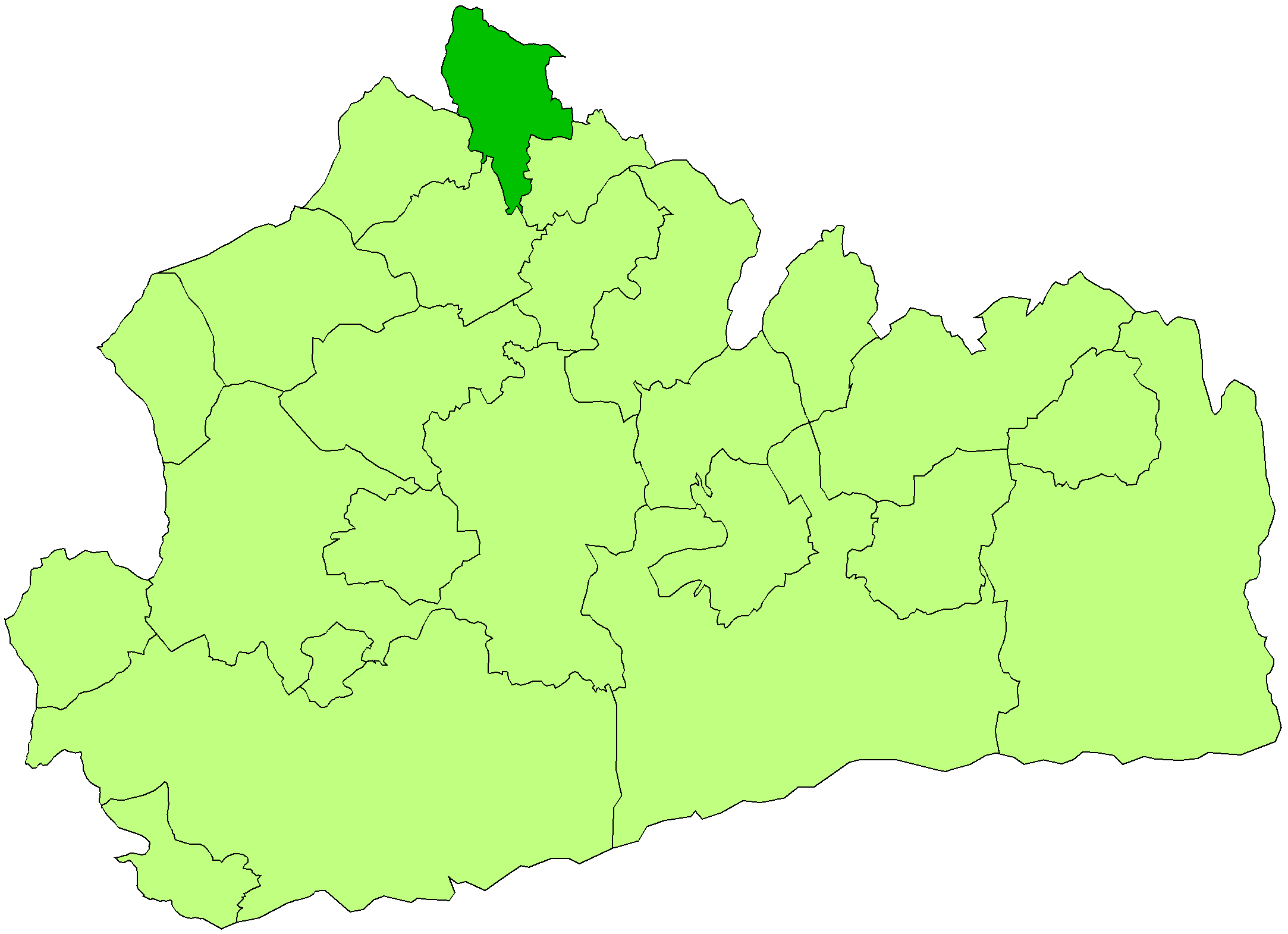
- Staines within Surrey in 1971
- Area
  - 1894: 1,918 acres (7.8 km^{2})
  - 1974: 8,270 acres (33.5 km^{2})
- Population
  - 1901: 6,688
  - 1971: 56,725
- History
  - Created: 1894
  - Abolished: 1974
  - Succeeded by: Spelthorne
- Status: Urban district
- Government
  - HQ: Staines
  - Motto: Ad pontes prospicimus (At the bridges we look forward)
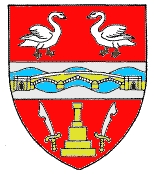
- Subdivisions
  - Type: Civil Parishes
  - Units: Staines Civil Parish; Ashford Civil Parish; Laleham Civil Parish; Stanwell Civil Parish

Staines was a local government district from 1894 to 1974 named after the English town of Staines.

== Background, functions and boundaries ==
Apart from the town of Staines itself which included a few rural pockets aside from its large moor until the 1940s, the district also covered the suburban settlements of Ashford and Stanwell and Laleham. In the far north, Stanwell and Staines Moor (collectively known as Staines Moor) formed the main agricultural area at the time of disbandment of the area. During its existence a significant amount of Staines Urban District's land was transferred to the Metropolitan Water Board to form two large reservoirs and a small percentage of a third. An aqueduct and pumping station were made c. 1902 when the Staines Reservoirs were constructed across the parish boundary in Stanwell, a main cemetery, in London Road was opened in 1911 by this authority and a cottage hospital in Kingston Road in 1914. Between the two wars building spread along the London Road, where the London Transport garage was opened in 1934. The chief area of development was to the south, around the Kingston and Laleham Roads. The 'bungalow town' of what were initially simply brick-built retirement properties with gardens in South Staines or the tithing of 'Penton' towards Penton Hook was in existence by 1919. By the demise of the area many of these plots had been transformed into the two-storey houses of London commuters and affluent workers. Between the Second World War and 1964 much of the remaining land in the south of the parish was built over. Many of the houses of Staines are detached or semi-detached, with some terraces dating from the 19th century A significant planned housing and population increase took place here as in the rest of the county during the existence of its County Council.

In 1894, under the Local Government Act 1894, Staines was changed to an urban district of Middlesex. It originally just covered the parish of Staines. In 1930 the civil parishes of Ashford, Laleham and Stanwell were added from the disbanded Staines Rural District.

The Minister for Local Government and Housing considered objections from the Royal Commission on Local Government in Greater London to place 14 urban districts in Greater London and the Staines urban district was one of 8 such districts to be excluded on objection. On 1 April 1965, when Middlesex was abolished and most of its former area was transferred to Greater London under the London Government Act 1963, Staines Urban District was one of three Urban Districts transferred to Surrey or to Hertfordshire.

Staines with Middlesex county in 1961

== Members and programmes ==
At the outset 12 members convened. On the addition of the three settlements mentioned in 1930 this number doubled.

The council met fortnightly until 1897, and until its demise generally met once a month. In 1886 there were seven committees, for the town hall, commons, cemetery, highways, hospital, finance, and drainage. The provision of a sewerage system was the first major task confronting the local board, and was finally accomplished in 1896, laying main sewers through four parishes beyond to reach the major works at Twickenham which avoided acquiring costly riverside land at Staines: its importance in the council's affairs is reflected in the fact that 'general purposes' became associated in the title of the drainage committee in 1897 and the two were not divided until 1930. The hospital committee was dissolved soon after it was formed, without having provided a hospital. In 1957 the council had ten committees, and two standing sub-committees. By 1939 the urban district contained 500 council houses, of which 94 were in Staines itself. Between 1947 and 1957 a further 1,369 were built almost all in the former Rural District - two, were in Staines parish and these are described as 'sold'.

In 1896-7 the council spent nearly £8,000, and in 1955-6 nearly £624,000, of which £525,000 went to the county council and Metropolitan Police. Apart from those employed on the roads, cemeteries, and others, the original staff comprised the clerk, surveyor, and medical officer of health. By 1957 there was also a treasurer, and the four principal officers had a subordinate staff of about 100. The local firm of solicitors Horne, Engall and Freeman provided the clerks to the select vestry, local board, and council, as well as to most of the other local bodies, from 1823 to 1946, when a full-time clerk was appointed. After the World War I the town hall at an oblique angle to the river became too small for the council's offices, which were transferred to nearby buildings in Clarence Street, given up in 1952, and in Bridge Street. The surveyor's department moved to the London Road in 1950 and the clerk's department to no. 73, High Street in 1952.

A school board of five members was formed for Staines in 1885. This took over all the existing elementary schools, but did not build any new ones until 1896. Its functions were transferred to the county council in 1902.

== Coat of arms ==
The district's coat of arms was granted in 1951. It is described as: Gules on a fess barry wavy of four argent and Azure between in chief two swans respectant proper and in base a representation of London Stone Or between two seaxes (Saxon swords) blades upwards and outwards of the second hilted and pommelled a representation of the Staines Bridge Or. The crest is: On a wreath of the colours upon the battlements of a tower Or a greyhound sejeant gules. The motto is Latin for "At the bridges we look forward".

The bridge is Staines Bridge, and the waves on which it stands is the River Thames. The London Stone is the local landmark, and the swans are associated with the river. The seaxes derive from the coat of arms of Middlesex, its county.

The greyhound is from the heraldry of Mr H. Scott Freeman, who was Clerk of the council from 1901 until 1946, and bore the cost of the grant.

Ad Pontes, part of the motto, was the Roman name for Staines.

== Successor ==
In 1974, under the Local Government Act 1972, the urban district was abolished and its former area was combined with that of Sunbury-on-Thames Urban District to form the present-day borough of Spelthorne.
