= Feltham Urban District =

Former local government area in the UK

Coordinates: 51.445°N 0.412°W

Feltham
- Feltham within Middlesex in 1961
- Area
  - 1894: 1,790 acres (7.2 km^{2})
  - 1965: 4,925 acres (19.9 km^{2})
- Population
  - 1901: 4,534
  - 1961: 51,047
- History
  - Created: 1904
  - Abolished: 1965
  - Succeeded by: London Borough of Hounslow
- Status: Urban district
- Government
  - HQ: Bridge House
  - Motto: In Unitatem Coemus (Let us go forward together)

Feltham was an urban district in the former county of Middlesex, England, from 1904 to 1965. As Middlesex was disbanded in 1965, Feltham now is a part of Greater London.

It was the main civic body covering the overlapping civil (and almost identical ecclesiastical) parish of Feltham. The area had before 1904 been part of the Staines Rural District created in 1895 and, in turn, its sanitary district forebear. In 1930, the parent district was abolished so two similar-sized parishes: East Bedfont (including its tall-hat-shaped Hatton northern part) and Hanworth to the south-west were added.

Feltham U.D. was abolished under the London Government Act 1963, in 1965, to form part the south-west of the new London Borough of Hounslow in a new county for London.

== Coat of arms ==
The district's coat of arms, granted in 1945, was: Per fess wavy argent and azure in chief two palets sable between a Tudor rose stalked, slipped and leaved proper and a peacock in his pride vert and in base in front of two wings conjoined of the first a sword erect or. The crest was: On a wreath of the colours within a chaplet of hawthorn fructed proper a mount of pellets thereon an eagle wings expanded or.

The wavy line and the silver and blue field represent the Duke of Northumberland's River which takes the head-waters of the River Colne to Syon House, and the Longford River (also called the Queen's or Cardinal's River) which takes the Colne Waters to serve the fountain and lakes of Hampton Court Palace.

The two black palets represent railway lines and indicate Feltham's importance in the southern portion of the British Railways system. (See Feltham marshalling yard).

The rose stands for the Tudor associations of Hanworth, particularly the claim that Elizabeth I spent much of her early childhood at Hanworth Manor. The peacock represents the topiary peacocks in the grounds of St Mary's Church, Bedfont, which are accepted as local emblems. The winged sword stands for London Airport and the district's close association with the aircraft industry. The sword also refers to the Royal Army Ordnance Depot, and to the ancient sword-mill marked on a 17th-century map.

The gunstones also allude to the R.A.O.C. Depot, and to the powder mills which formerly existed in the Crane Valley. The hawthorn refers to the Spelthorne Hundred, and the eagle is a reference not only of air traffic, but also of the Roman-founded London to Bath (Aquae Sulis) and Calleva Atrebatum (town ruins in the parish of Silchester) roads which passed through the district.

== Components ==
- East Bedfont Civil Parish (from 1930)
- Feltham Civil Parish (throughout)
- Hanworth Civil Parish (From 1930)

=== 1934 minor changes to area ===
Minor area changes took place in 1934; gains of 8 acres (0.032 km^{2}), and losses of 16, 50, 98 and 8 acres to neighbouring districts. These were noted to move a total of approximately 257 people based on the 1931 census. The total area of the District on its April 1965 abolition was 1,993 acres (8.07 km^{2}).
