= Grade II* listed buildings in Hertsmere =

There are over 20,000 Grade II* listed buildings in England. This page is a list of these buildings in the district of Hertsmere in Hertfordshire.

== Hertsmere ==
Name	Location	Type	Completed (Note: The date given is the date used by Historic England as significant for the initial building or that of an important part in the structure's description.)	Date designated	Grid ref. (Note: The grid reference is based on the British national grid reference system, sometimes known as OSGB36, used by the Ordnance Survey.) Geo-coordinates	Entry number (Note: The "List Entry Number" is a unique number assigned to each listed building and scheduled monument by Historic England.)	Image
Aldenham House and Stable Block	Elstree, Aldenham, Hertsmere	Country House	c. 1672	1 September 1953	TQ1685196530; 51°39′20″N 0°18′44″W	1346891	Aldenham House and Stable Block More images
Batlers Green House	Batlers Green, Aldenham, Hertsmere	House	c. 1500	1 September 1953	TQ1557798543; 51°40′26″N 0°19′48″W	1296473	Upload Photo
Holly Bush Public House	Elstree, Elstree and Borehamwood, Hertsmere	House	17th century	30 April 1974	TQ1786695461; 51°38′44″N 0°17′52″W	1103589	Holly Bush Public House More images
The Leys	Elstree and Borehamwood, Hertsmere	House	1901	7 June 1995	TQ1832694896; 51°38′26″N 0°17′29″W	1263392	Upload Photo
Church of St Margaret	Ridge, Hertsmere	Parish Church	14th century	25 February 1952	TL2136600462; 51°41′23″N 0°14′44″W	1103539	Church of St Margaret More images
Salisbury Hall	London Colney, Shenley, Hertsmere	Country House	1668-79	25 February 1952	TL1953502827; 51°42′41″N 0°16′17″W	1346960	Salisbury Hall More images
St Botolphs	Shenley	House	1970s	25 February 1952	TL1832501859; 51°42′11″N 0°17′21″W	1308251	St Botolphs More images
Knightsland Farm House	Barnet, South Mimms, Hertsmere	House	c. 1600	20 May 1949	TQ2335998500; 51°40′18″N 0°13′03″W	1346930	Knightsland Farm House More images
Lodges and arched Gateway to Dyrham Park	Dyrham Park, South Mimms, Hertsmere	Gate Lodge	c1790-1800	20 May 1949	TQ2324298924; 51°40′32″N 0°13′09″W	1103565	Lodges and arched Gateway to Dyrham Park More images
Church of St James	Bushey, Hertsmere	Parish Church	early/mid 13th century	14 September 1949	TQ1303195223; 51°38′40″N 0°22′04″W	1103603	Church of St James More images
Hilfield Castle	Patchetts Green, Hertsmere	Castle	1798-99	1 June 1984	TQ1529096295; 51°39′13″N 0°20′05″W	1103569	Hilfield Castle More images
Lululaund	Bushey, Hertsmere	House	1886-1894	21 June 1978	TQ1364695195; 51°38′39″N 0°21′32″W	1103577	Lululaund More images
Wrotham Park and Stable Block	Barnet, Hertsmere	Country House	1754	20 May 1949	TQ2479099155; 51°40′38″N 0°11′48″W	1174715	Wrotham Park and Stable Block More images
