= Air Raid Precautions =

British civil defence programme

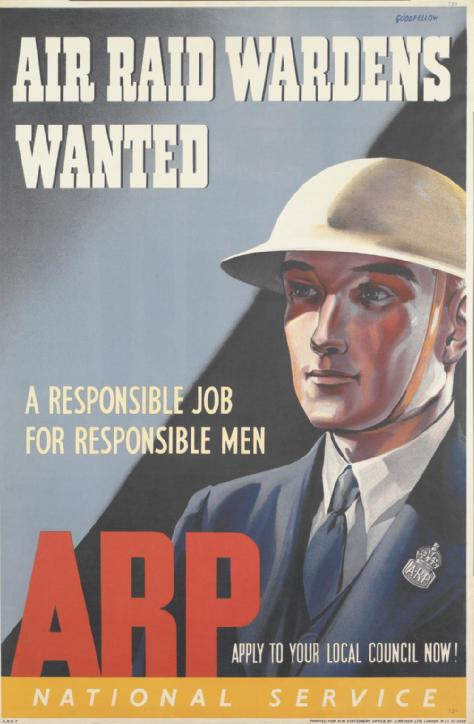
Recruitment poster for Air Raid Wardens

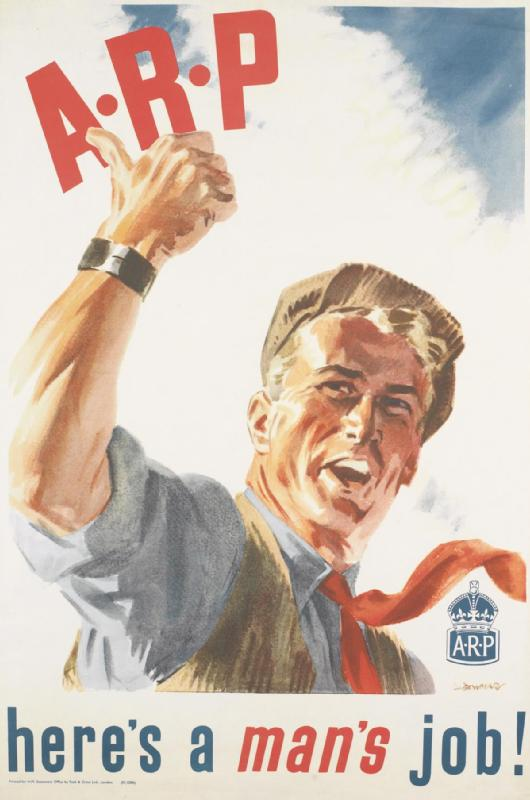
ARP poster

Air Raid Precautions (ARP) refers to a number of organisations and guidelines in the United Kingdom dedicated to the protection of civilians from the danger of air raids. Government consideration for air raid precautions increased in the 1920s and 30s, with the Raid Wardens' Service set up in 1937 to report on bombing incidents. Every local Borough Council was responsible for organising ARP wardens, messengers, ambulance drivers, rescue parties, and liaison with police and fire brigades.

From 1 September 1939, ARP wardens enforced the "blackout". Heavy curtains and shutters were required on all private residences, commercial premises, and factories to prevent light escaping and so making them a possible marker for enemy bombers to locate their targets.

With increased enemy bombing during the Blitz, the ARP services were central in reporting and dealing with bombing incidents. They managed the air raid sirens and ensured people were directed to shelters. Women were involved in ARP services, working as Wardens and through the Women's Voluntary Service.

The Auxiliary Fire Service was set up in 1938 to support existing local fire services, which were amalgamated into a National Fire Service in 1941.

From 1941 the ARP officially changed its title to Civil Defence Service to reflect the wider range of roles it then encompassed. During the war almost 7,000 Civil Defence workers were killed. In all some 1.5 million men and women served within the organisation during World War Two. Over 127,000 full-time personnel were involved at the height of the Blitz but by the end of 1943 this had dropped to 70,000. The Civil Defence Service was stood down towards the end of the war in Europe on 2 May 1945.

Between 1949 and 1968 many of the duties of the Civil Defence Service were resurrected through the Civil Defence Corps.

== Origins ==
During the First World War Britain was bombed by Zeppelins and Gotha bombers and it was predicted that large-scale aerial bombing of the civilian population would feature prominently in any future war. In 1924, the Committee of Imperial Defence set up a subcommittee to look at what measure could be taken to protect the civil population from aerial attack. The new committee, known as Air Raid Precautions, was headed by the then Lord Privy Seal, Sir John Anderson.

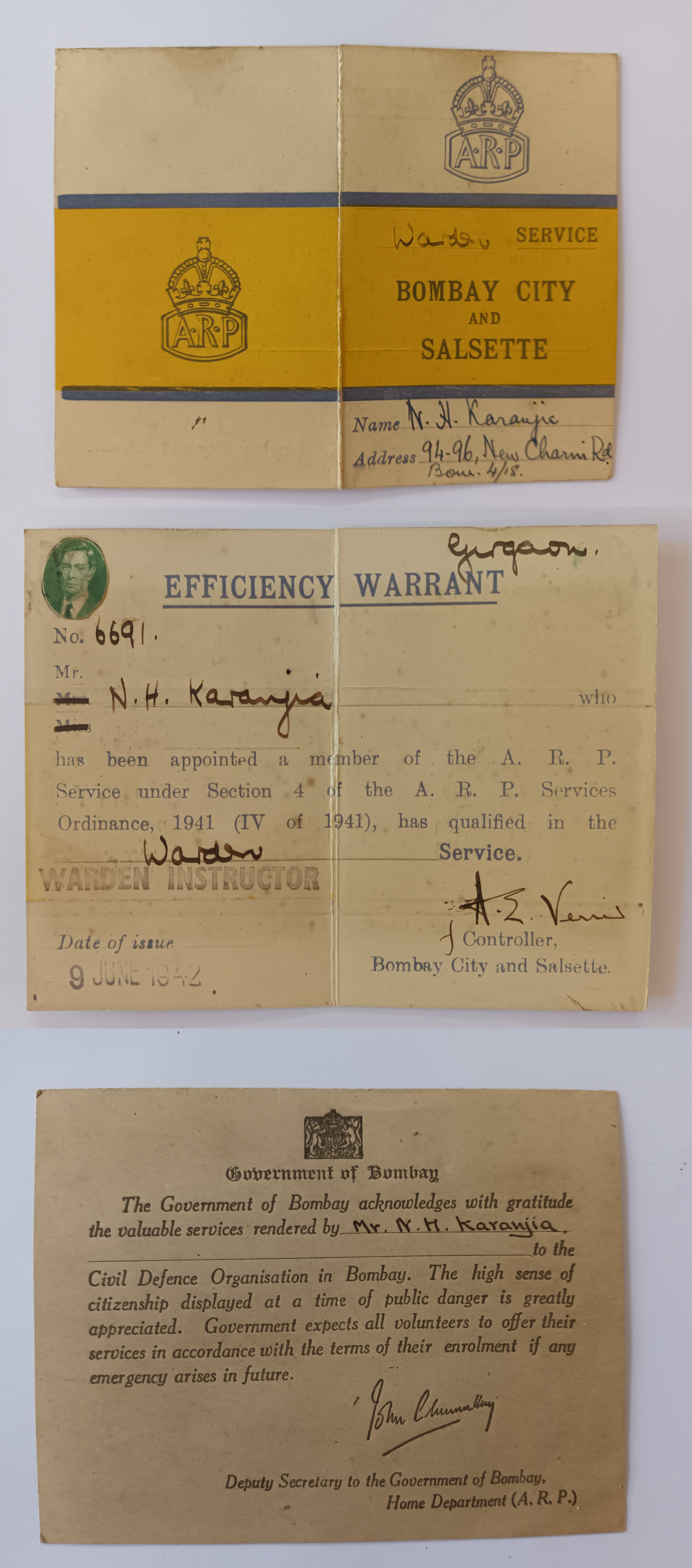
ARP Warden Service Efficiency Warrant issued to NH Karanjia, Bombay, June 1942 with Acknowledgement of Gratitude Card

For the next ten years this committee looked into issues of new aerial weapons development and the possible impact on civilians. The use of gas attacks in the First World War played heavily on the decisions and protection via gas masks was a core decision taken by the committee. Every single person would need a gas mask which meant nearly 40 million would be required. Together with ideas around the building of air raid shelters, evacuations of people and blackout requirements these were all termed passive air defence.

With the rise of Adolf Hitler and Nazi Germany's remilitarisation during the 1930s, a further Home Office committee, the Air Raid Precautions (ARP) Department, was created in March 1935. This department replaced the earlier subcommittees and took overall control of the British response to passive air defence.

Air-Raid Precautions Act 1937 (Note: Section 15(1).)
- Act of Parliament
- Parliament of the United Kingdom
- Long title: An Act to secure that precautions shall be taken with a view to the protection of persons and property from injury or damage in the event of hostile attack from the air.
- Citation: 1 & 2 Geo. 6. c. 6
- Territorial extent: England and Wales; Scotland; Northern Ireland (section 14); (Note: Section 15(2).)

Dates
- Royal assent: 22 December 1937
- Commencement: 22 December 1937 (Note: The Acts of Parliament (Commencement) Act 1793.)
- Repealed: 27 May 1976
Other legislation
Repealed by	Statute Law (Repeals) Act 1976

Status: Repealed

Text of statute as originally enacted

In April 1937, the Air Raid Wardens' Service was created which aimed to seek some 800,000 volunteers (some 200,000 people had joined by mid-1938, and following the Munich Crisis of September 1938 another 500,000 had enrolled). After the bombing of Guernica, Gaumont-British began distributing newsreels on air-raid safety to British cinemas. Wardens gave ARP advice to the public and were responsible for reporting bombs and other incidents, and were joined by the Women's Voluntary Service in May 1938. On 1 January 1938, the Air-Raid Precautions Act 1937 (1 & 2 Geo. 6. c. 6) came into force, compelling all local authorities to begin creating their own ARP services. Air raid shelters were distributed from 1938.

With the threat of war imminent in 1939, the Home Office issued dozens of leaflets advising people on how to protect themselves from the inevitable air war to follow, with the Ministry of Home Security providing information for the civilian population as the war progressed.

== ARP duties ==
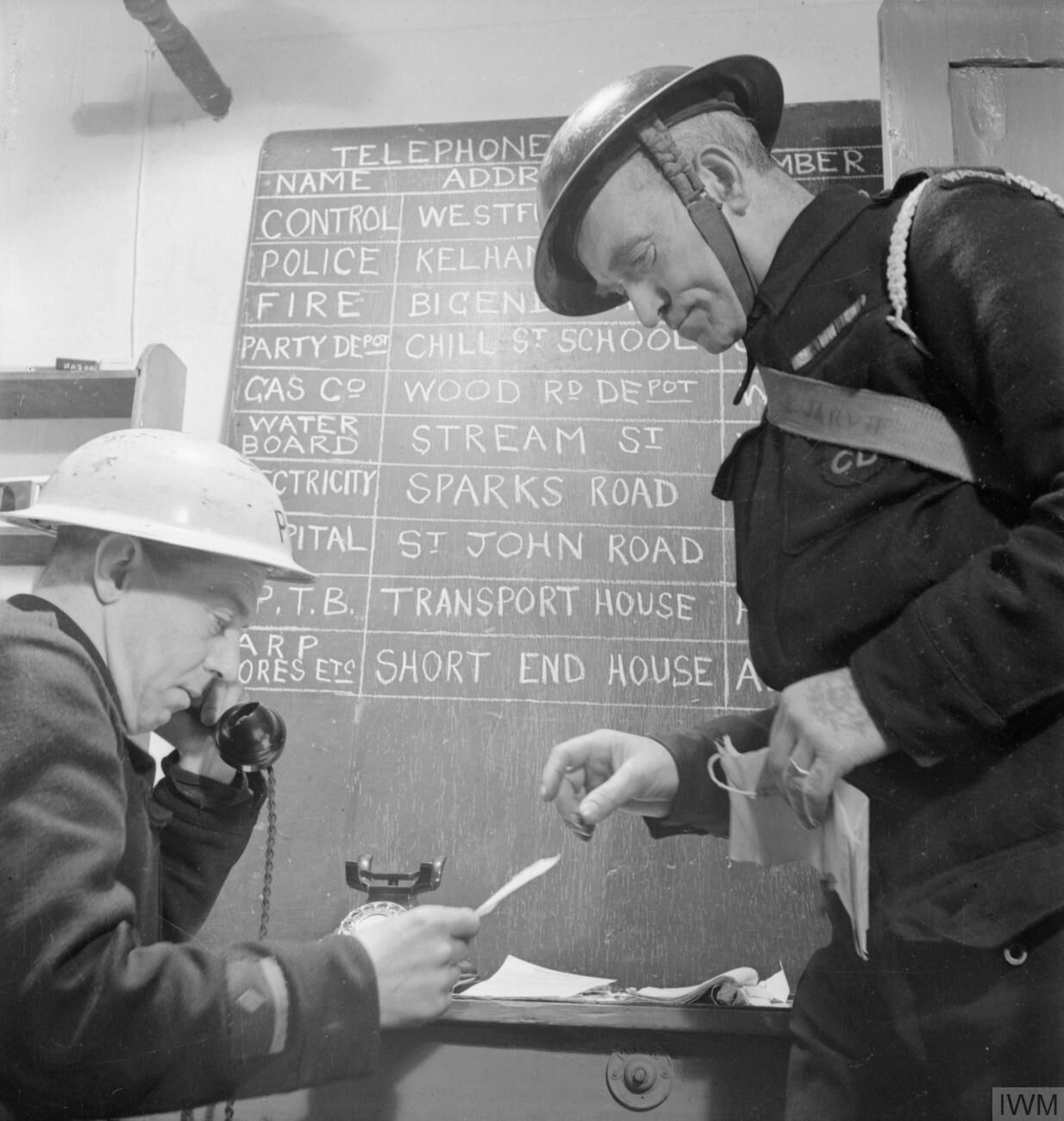
Civil Defence training exercise in Fulham, London, 1942

The ARP services were to include several specialist branches:

=== Wardens ===
ARP wardens ensured the blackout was observed, sounded air raid sirens, safely guided people into public air raid shelters, issued and checked gas masks, evacuated areas around unexploded bombs, rescued people where possible from bomb damaged properties, located temporary accommodation for those who had been bombed out, and reported to their control centre about incidents, fires, etc. Also, they called in other services as required.

=== Report and control ===
Central headquarters that received information from wardens and messengers and managed the delivery of the relevant services needed to deal with each incident.

=== Messengers ===
Often Boy Scouts or Boys' Brigade members aged between 14 and 18 as messengers or runners would take verbal or written messages from air raid wardens and deliver them to either the sector post or the Control centre. Bombing would sometimes cut telephone lines and messengers performed an important role in giving the ARP services a fuller picture of events. They also prevented telephone exchanges becoming congested with callers as at the time exchanges were all hand operated.

=== First aid parties ===
Trained to give first response first aid to those injured in bombing incidents. First aid parties would provide initial treatment on scene, and could call upon doctors and nurses to provide enhanced care.

=== Ambulance drivers ===
Casualties from bombing were taken to first aid posts or hospital by volunteer drivers.

=== Rescue services ===
The rescue services were involved in getting the dead and injured out of bombed premises.

=== Gas decontamination ===
Specialists to deal with and clean up incidents involving chemical weapons.

=== Fire guards ===
Following the destruction caused by the bombing of the City of London in late December 1940, the Fire Watcher scheme was introduced in January 1941. All buildings in certain areas had to have a 24-hour watch kept. In the event of fire these fire watchers could call on the rescue services and ensure they could access the building to deal with incidents.

== Second World War ==
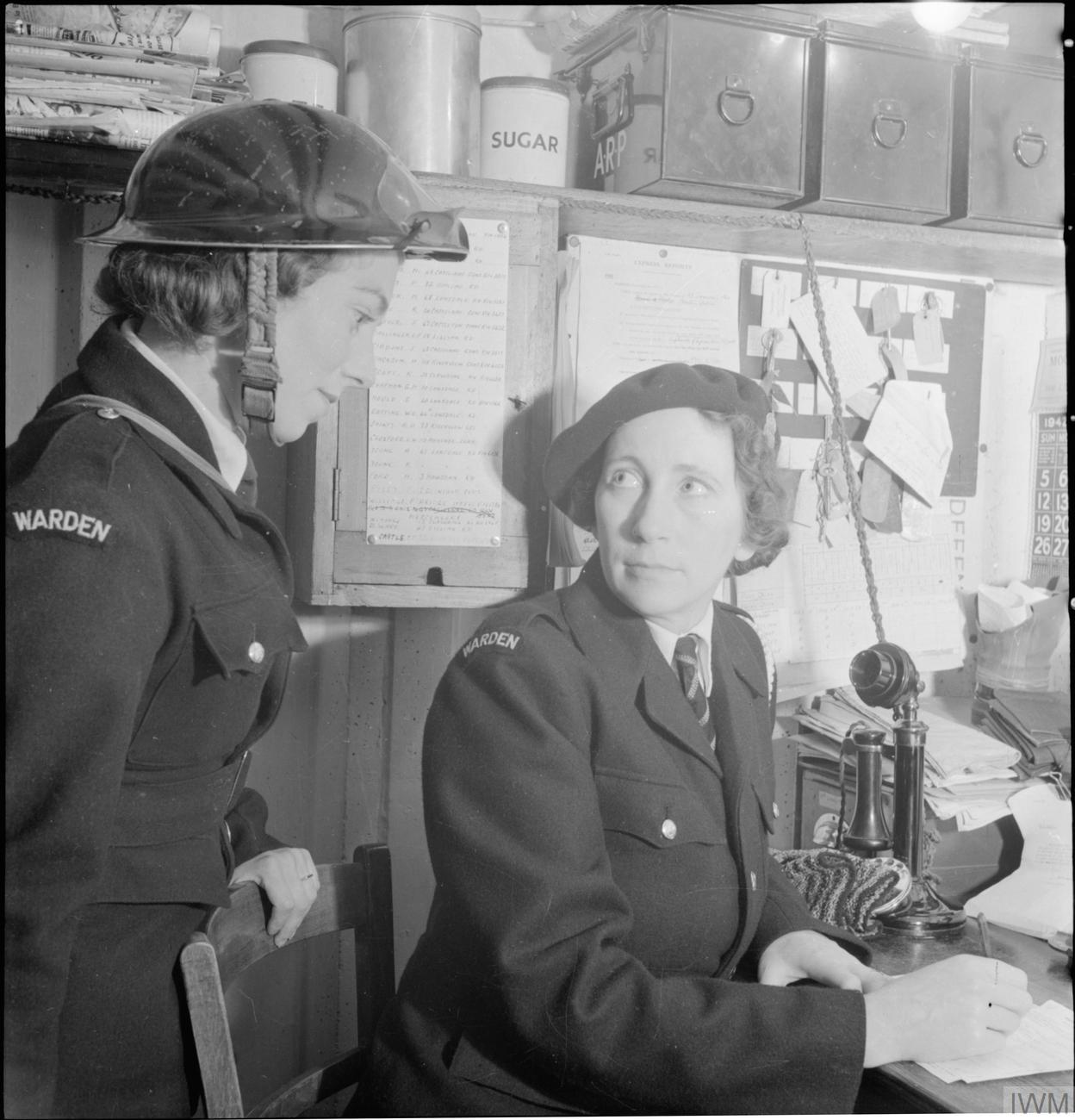
ARP wardens working at a London ARP sector post.

Local councils were responsible for organising all the necessary ARP services in their areas. Although the standard procedures prescribed that the ideal warden should be at least 30 years old, men and women of all ages were wardens. In certain instances, given special needs of communities, even teenagers were wardens. The role of ARP was open to both men and women but only men could serve in the gas contamination (teams that dealt with chemical and gas bombs), heavy and light rescue and demolition services.

Control of a local authority's warden service was through a chief warden to whom each sector's area warden would report. Within metropolitan boroughs, the initial aim was to have one warden to every 500 residents (this increased later), reporting from individual warden posts – each with its own Post Warden. Post wardens received messages from the local wardens which they passed to the central Report and Control headquarters.

ARP wardens were initially set up in temporary posts (in homes, shops and offices) and later in purpose-built facilities, mainly at the junctions of roads. In cities, a warden post was responsible for a small area (larger in rural areas) with five wardens to every 4–5,000 people. In London there were approximately ten posts to the square mile. Divided into sectors each post had between three and six wardens who had local knowledge of the location of shelters, utilities (water, gas, electric), what buildings contained (important for the fire services) and who was resident in their sector. ARP wardens had the task of patrolling the streets during blackout, to ensure that no light was visible. If a light was spotted, the warden would alert the person/people responsible by shouting something like "Put that light out!". They could report persistent offenders to the local police.

During the seven-month Phoney War period following the outbreak of war in September 1939, ARP wardens mainly offered advice, issued gas masks and air raid shelters (such as the external Anderson and internal Morrison shelter) and enforced the blackout.

=== The Blitz ===
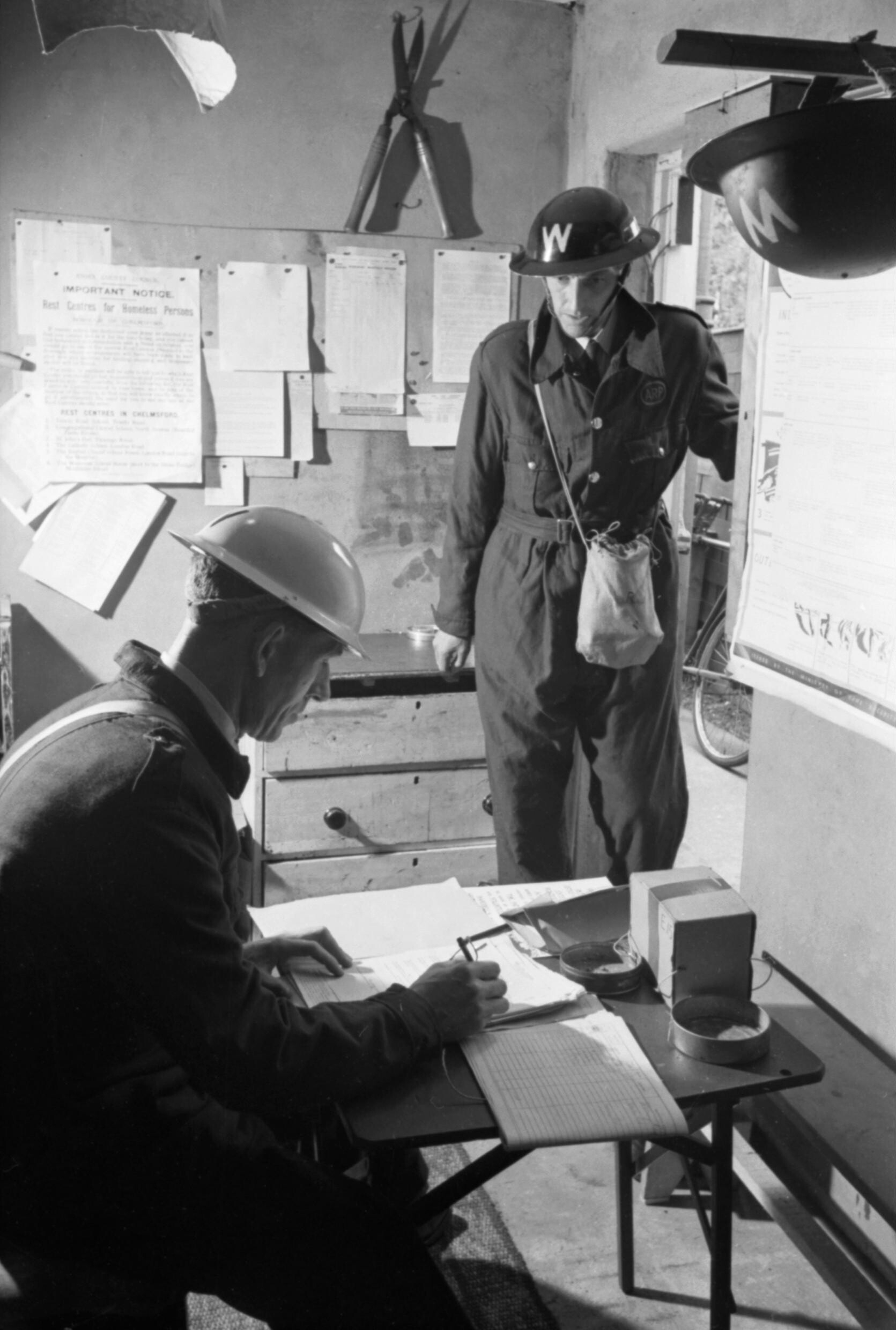
An ARP warden (in overalls) reports for duty to the Chief Warden at his sector post in Springfield, Essex, August 1941.

The role of ARP services came into their own during the Blitz of 1940–41. ARP control centres would sound the air raid sirens and wardens would marshal people into the shelters and then watch out for the fall of any bombs within their sector – often done during air raids and therefore highly dangerous.

When the wardens came across the site of a bombing they would telephone for the emergency services, render first aid to victims with minor injuries and deal with small fires (placing sand on incendiary devices). Other ARP units included first-aid, light and heavy rescue parties, stretcher parties and messenger boys and girls (who cycled between incidents carrying messages from wardens). Other duties included helping to police areas suffering bomb damage and helping bombed-out householders. They were also tasked with keeping an emergency under control until official rescue services arrived.

From 1 September 1939 a small percentage of ARP wardens were full-time and were paid a salary (£3 for men, £2 for women), but most were part-time volunteers who carried out their ARP duties as well as full-time jobs. Part-time wardens were supposed to be on duty about three nights a week, but this increased greatly when the bombing was heaviest. One in six was a woman, and amongst the men there were a significant number of veterans of World War I.

== Uniform ==
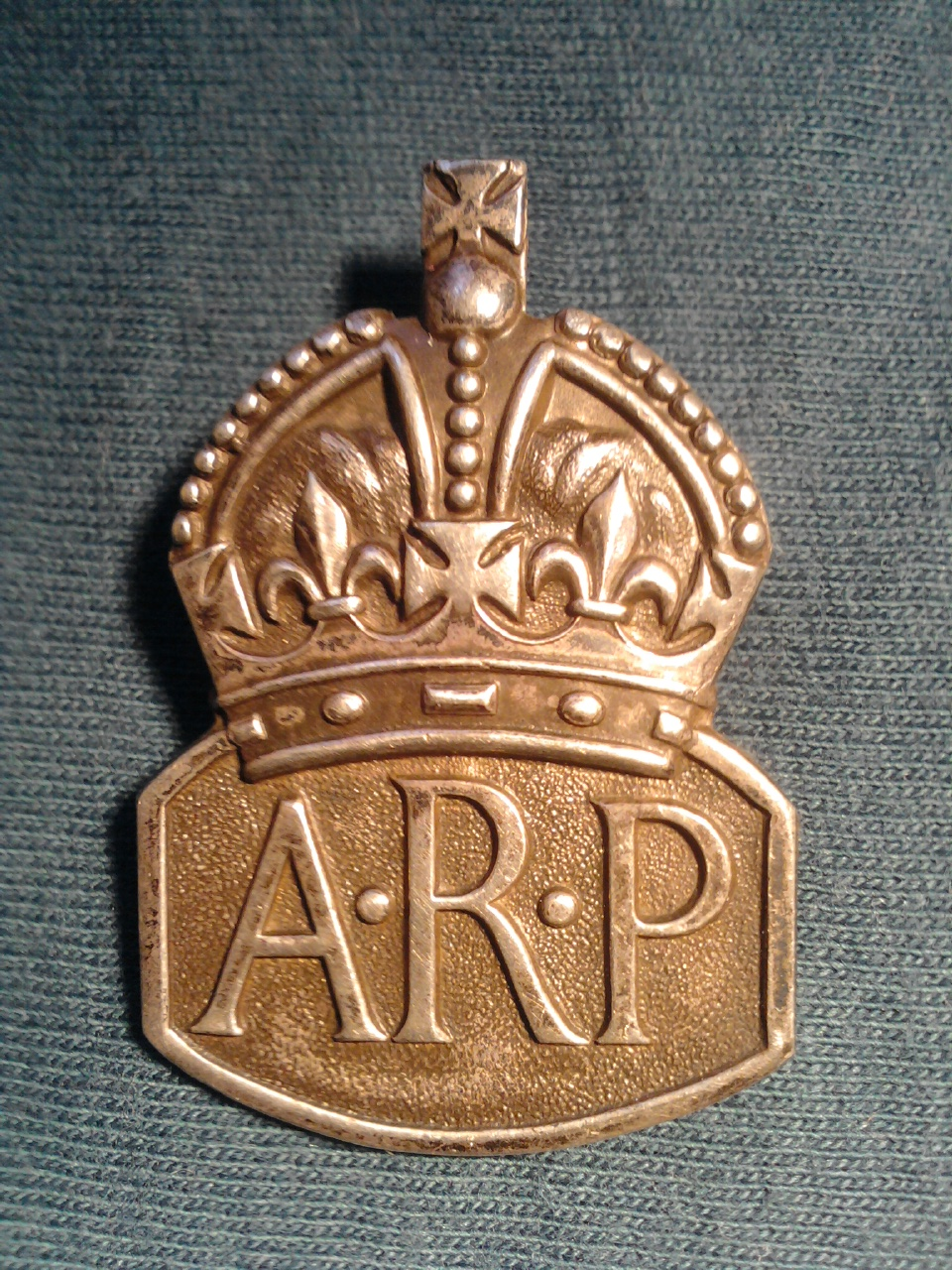
Silver 1936 ARP lapel badge

At the beginning of the war, ARP wardens had no uniform, but wore their own clothes (wardens wore helmets, arm bands and badges on their civilian clothes) and in October 1939 issued with 'bluette' overalls with a red on black 'ARP' badge.

From the formation of the ARP until 1939, the badges were produced by the Royal Mint and made of solid sterling silver, with a crescent-shaped button hole attachment for men and a pin style brooch for women. From 1940 on, the badges were made of a base metal.

From May 1941 full-time and regular part-time wardens were issued with dark blue battledress and beret. Women were issued with a four pocket tunic, again in dark blue serge with skirt.

=== Helmets ===
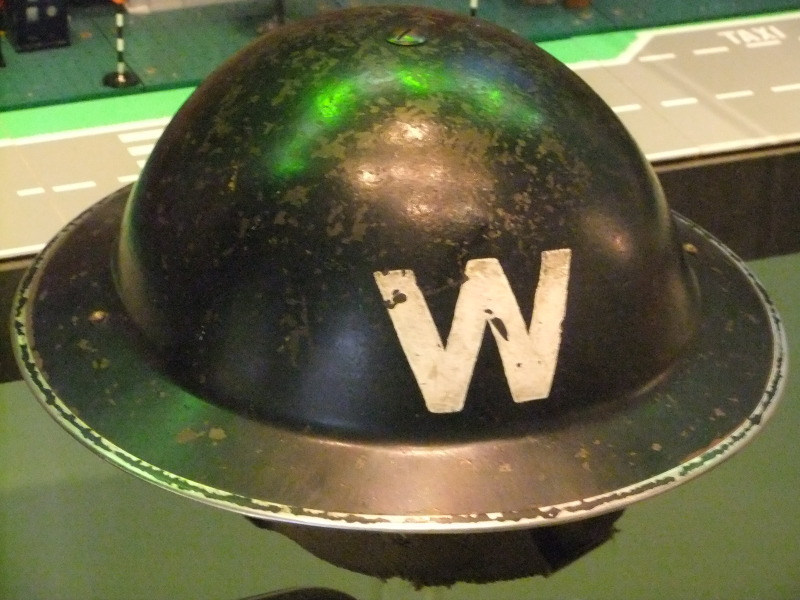
ARP warden's helmet.

ARP service personnel were issued with Mk. II British helmets. These were often not made to the same level as issued to soldiers to reduce costs. These helmets, which had less resistance to ballistic impact, would have small holes drilled in the rim to show they were not for front line use. Depending on the role of the person the helmet would be marked with a letter or letters to easily allow others to ascertain their role at an incident.

- W for wardens (some warden/fire guards had W/FG). Rank within the warden service was denoted by a white helmet and black bands.
- R for rescue services (later HR and LR were used for heavy and light rescue parties)
- RP for repair parties
- FAP for first aid parties and first aid posts
- A for ambulance drivers
- M for messenger/runner

== Numbers ==
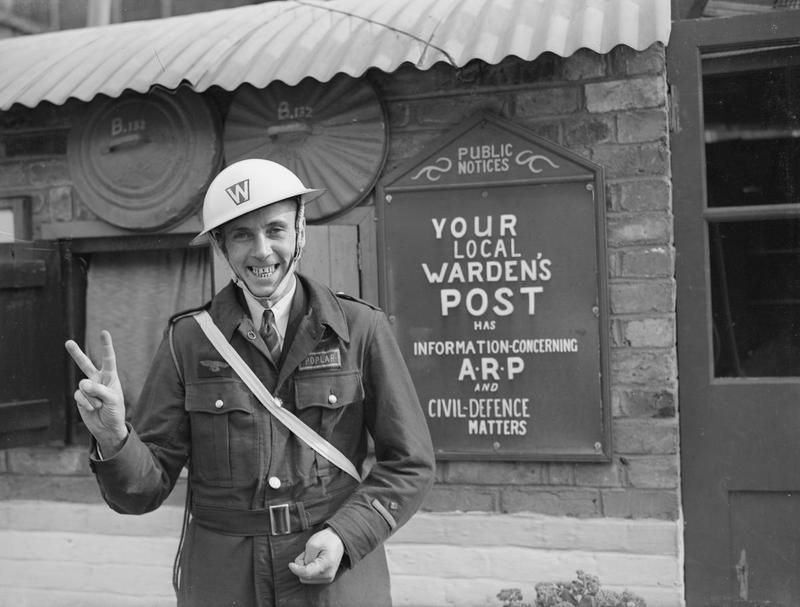
An ARP warden in Poplar, London at the start of the Second World War.

By the outbreak of war there were more than 1.5 million involved in the various ARP services. There were around 1.4 million ARP wardens in Britain during the war.

Full-time ARP staff peaked at just over 131,000 in December 1940 (nearly 20,000 were women). By 1944, with the decreasing threat from enemy bombing, the total of full-time ARP staff had dropped to approximately 67,000 (10,000 of whom were women). Volunteers in 1944 numbered nearly 800,000 (of whom 180,000 were women).

=== Civil Defence regions ===
Mainland Britain was divided in eleven CD regions. Each has a headquarters that controlled the services in that region.

- Region 1 – Northern – Newcastle
- Region 2 – North Eastern – Leeds
- Region 3 – North Midland – Nottingham
- Region 4 – Eastern – Cambridge
- Region 5 – London
  - Group 1 – 1. Chelsea, 2. Fulham, 3. Hammersmith, 4. Kensington, 5. Westminster
  - Group 2 – 6. Hampstead, 7. Paddington, 8. St Marylebone, 9. St Pacras, 10. Islington, 11. Stoke Newington
  - Group 3 – 12. Bethnal Green, 13. City of London, 14. Finsbury, 15. Hackney, 16. Holborn, 17. Poplar, 18. Shoreditch, 19. Stepney
  - Group 4 – 20. Bermondsey, 21. Deptford, 22. Greenwich, 23. Lewisham, 24. Woolwich
  - Group 5 – 25. ??, 26. ??, 27. ??, 28. ??, 29. ??
  - Group 6A – 30. Cheshunt, 31. East Barnet, 32. Edmonton, 33. Enfield, 34. Hornsey, 35. Southgate, 36. Tottenham, 37. Wood Green
  - Group 6B – 38. Friern Barnet, 39. Potter's Bar, 40. Barnet Rural District, 41. Finchley, 43. Barnet Urban District, 46. Hendon
  - Group 6C – 42. Bushey, 44. Harrow, 45. Ruislip and Northwood, 47. Uxbridge, 48. Wembley, 49. Willesden, 50. Acton, 51. Ealing, 60. Southall and Norwood
  - Group 6D – 54. Brentford, 53. Feltham, 54. Hayes and ??, 55. Heston and ??, 56. Staines, 57. Sunbury, 58. Twickenham, 59. Yiewsley
  - Group 7 – 61. ??, 62. ??, 63. ??, 65. ??, 66. ??, 67. ??, 68. ??, 69. ??, 70. ??, 71. ?? + 1 other
  - Group 8 – 72. Beckenham, 73. Bexley, 74. Bromley, 75. ??, 78. ??, 79. ??
  - Group 9A – 80. Barnes, 81. ??, 82. ??, 83. ??, 84. ??, 85. ??, 86. ??, 88. ??
  - Group 9B – 90. ??, 91. ??, 92. ??, 93. ??, 94. ??, 95. ??
- Region 6 – Southern – Reading
- Region 7 – South Western – Bristol
- Region 8 – Wales – Cardiff
- Region 9 - Midland – Birmingham
- Region 10 – North Western – Manchester
- Region 11 – Scotland – Glasgow
- Region 12 – Northern Ireland – Belfast

== Medals ==
Many wardens went considerably beyond the call of duty and a search of medal citations in the London Gazette demonstrates this. The first ARP warden to receive the George Cross was Thomas Alderson, who won his award for actions saving civilian life in Bridlington in 1940.

== Gallery of ARP photographs ==
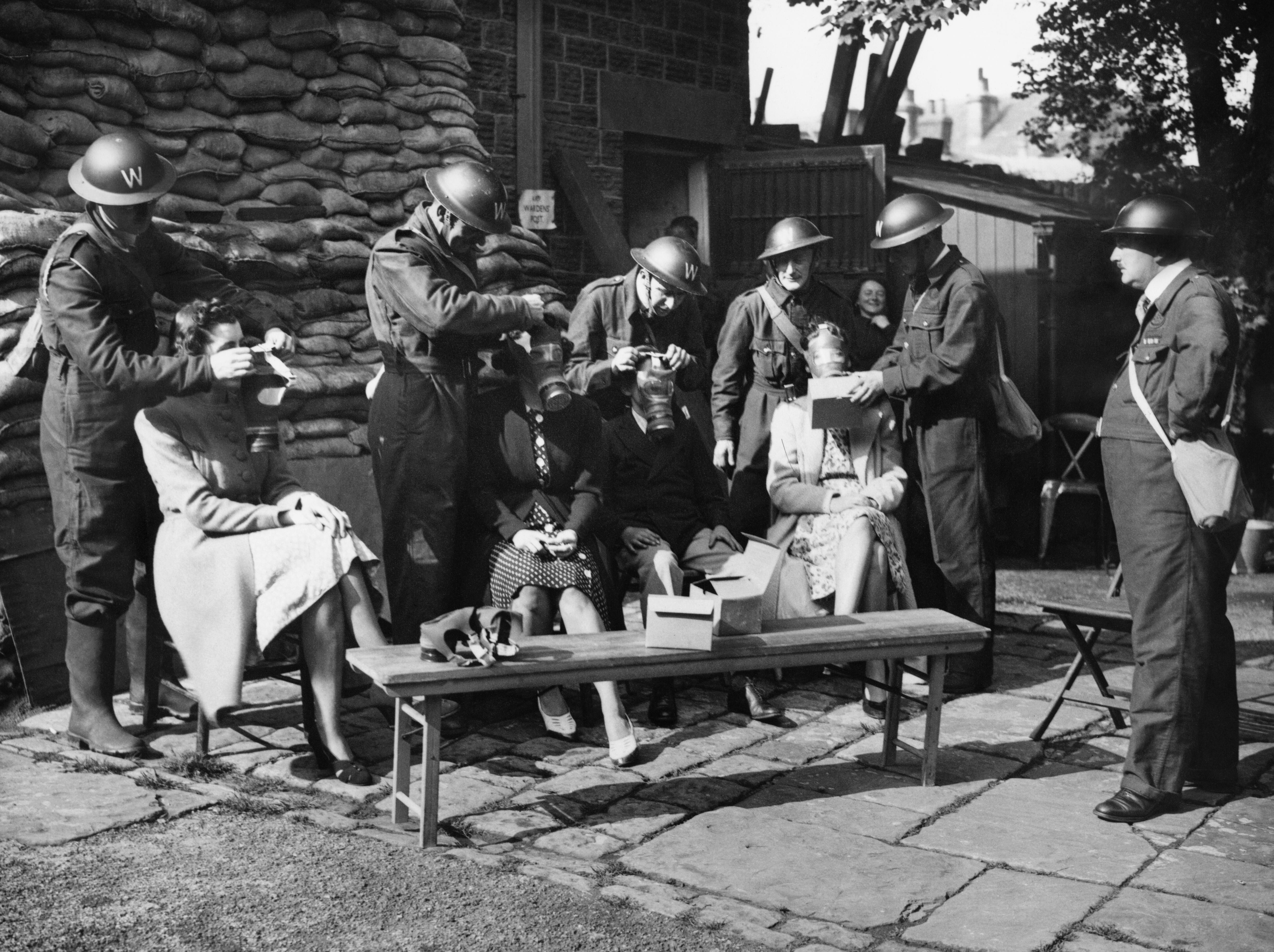
Issue of gas masks to British civilians, 1940

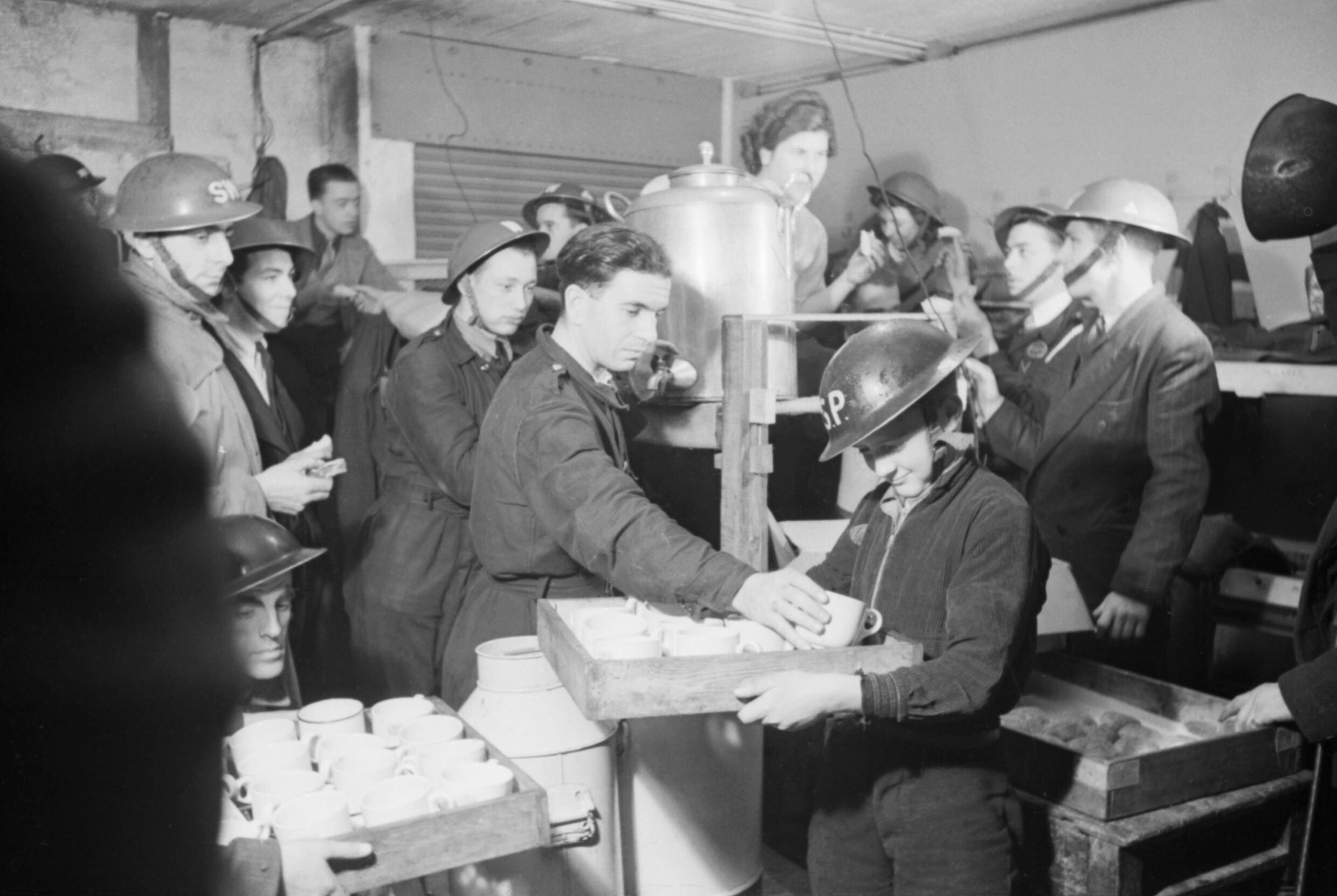
Tea and buns are supplied by local ARP workers to fellow workers and civilians in a basement shelter in south east London, 1940

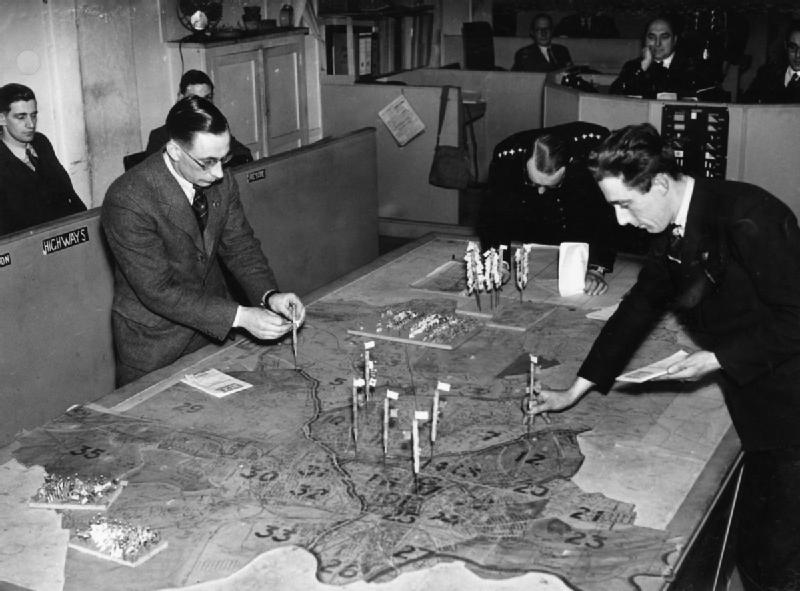
ARP control room, Nottingham, 1940

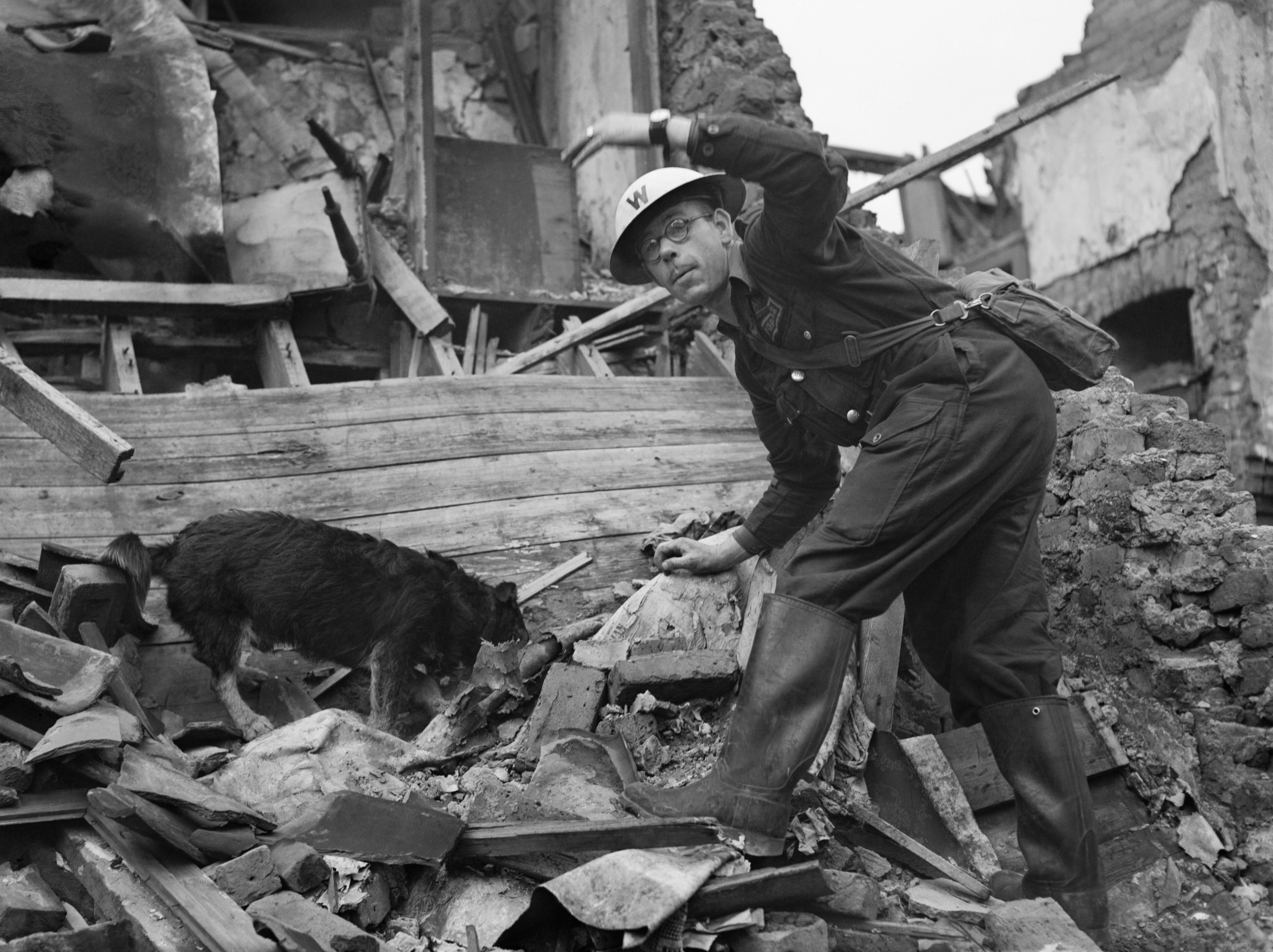
Air Raid Precautions dog at work in Poplar, London, England, 1941

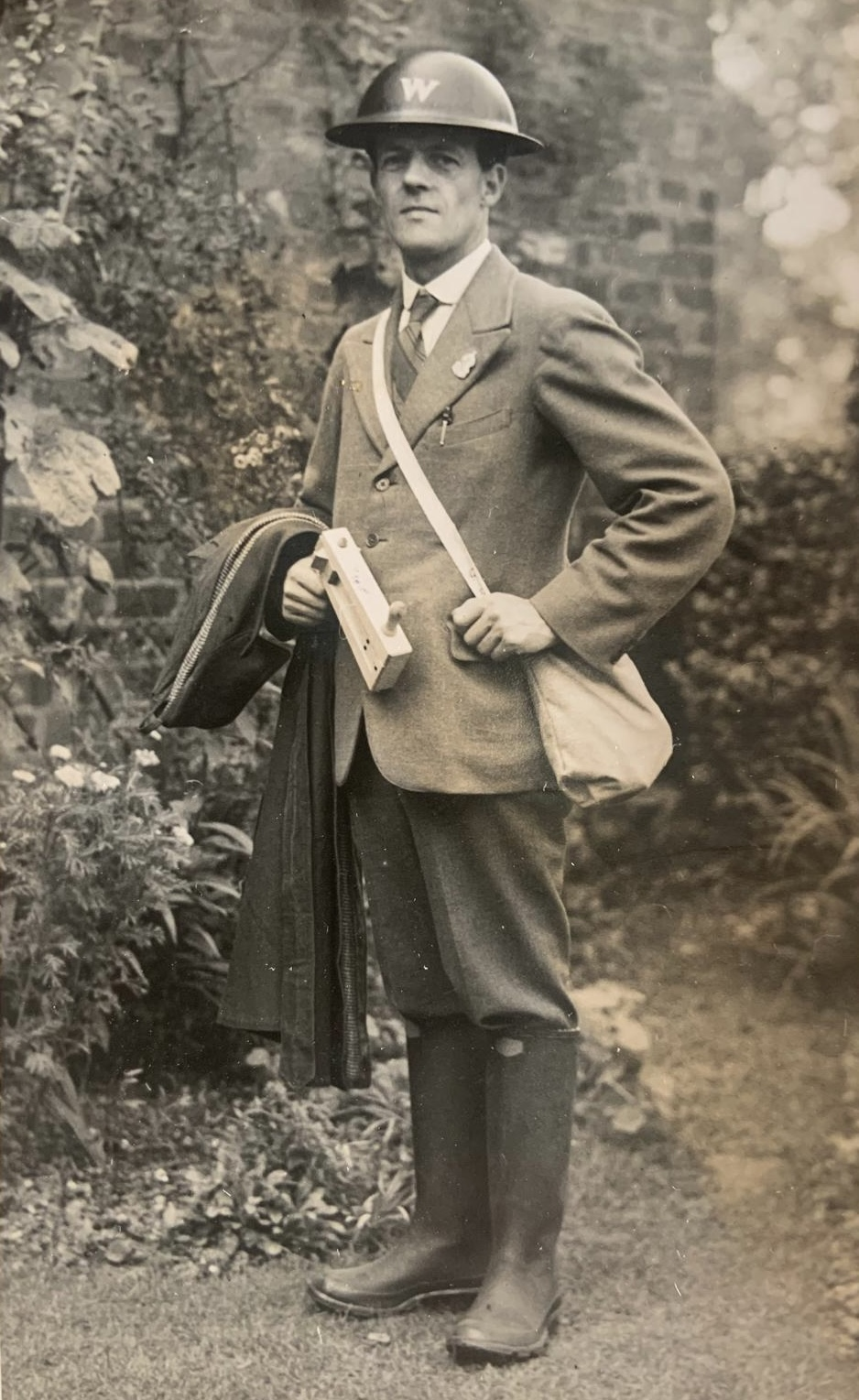
Postcard featuring an A.R.P. Warden, 1939

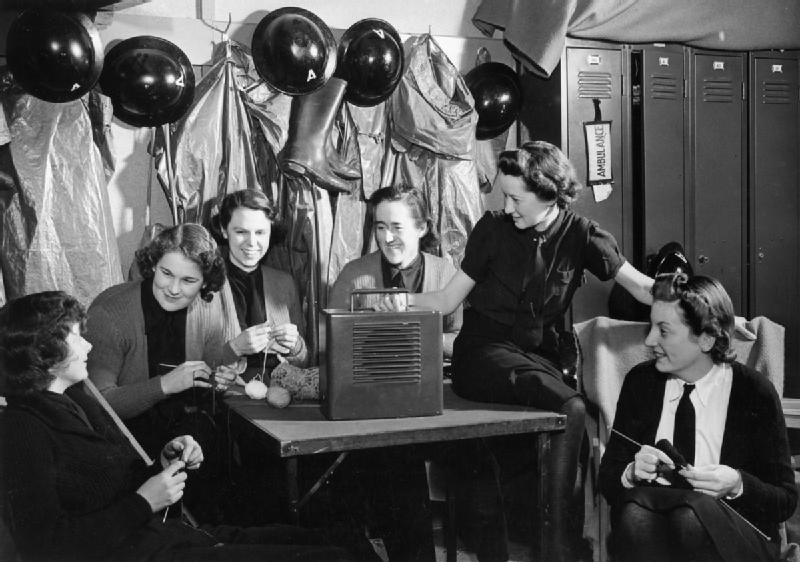
Ambulance drivers knit and listen to a wireless while they await a call out to air raid incidents in 1940

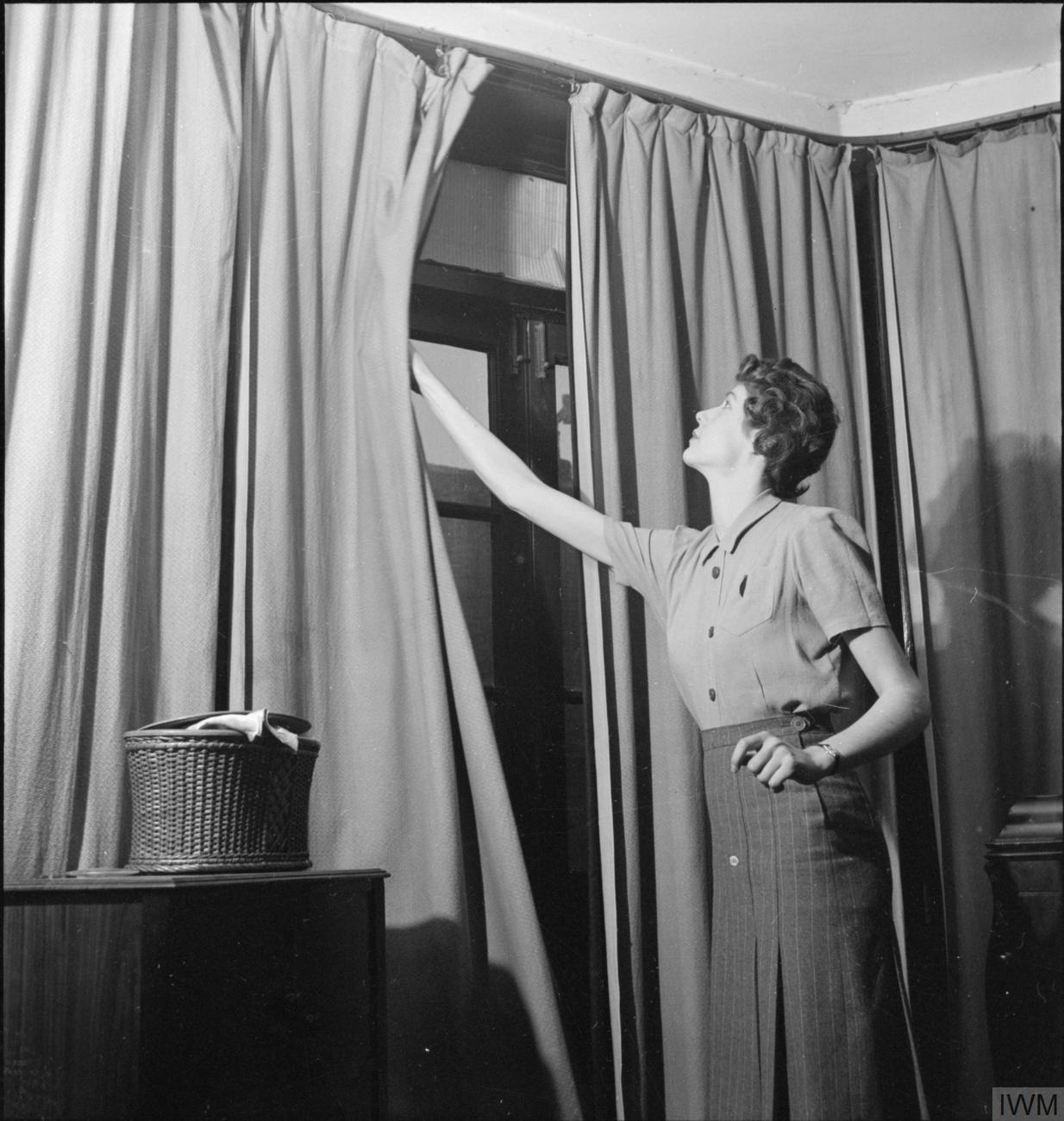
Adjusting blackout curtains in 1943

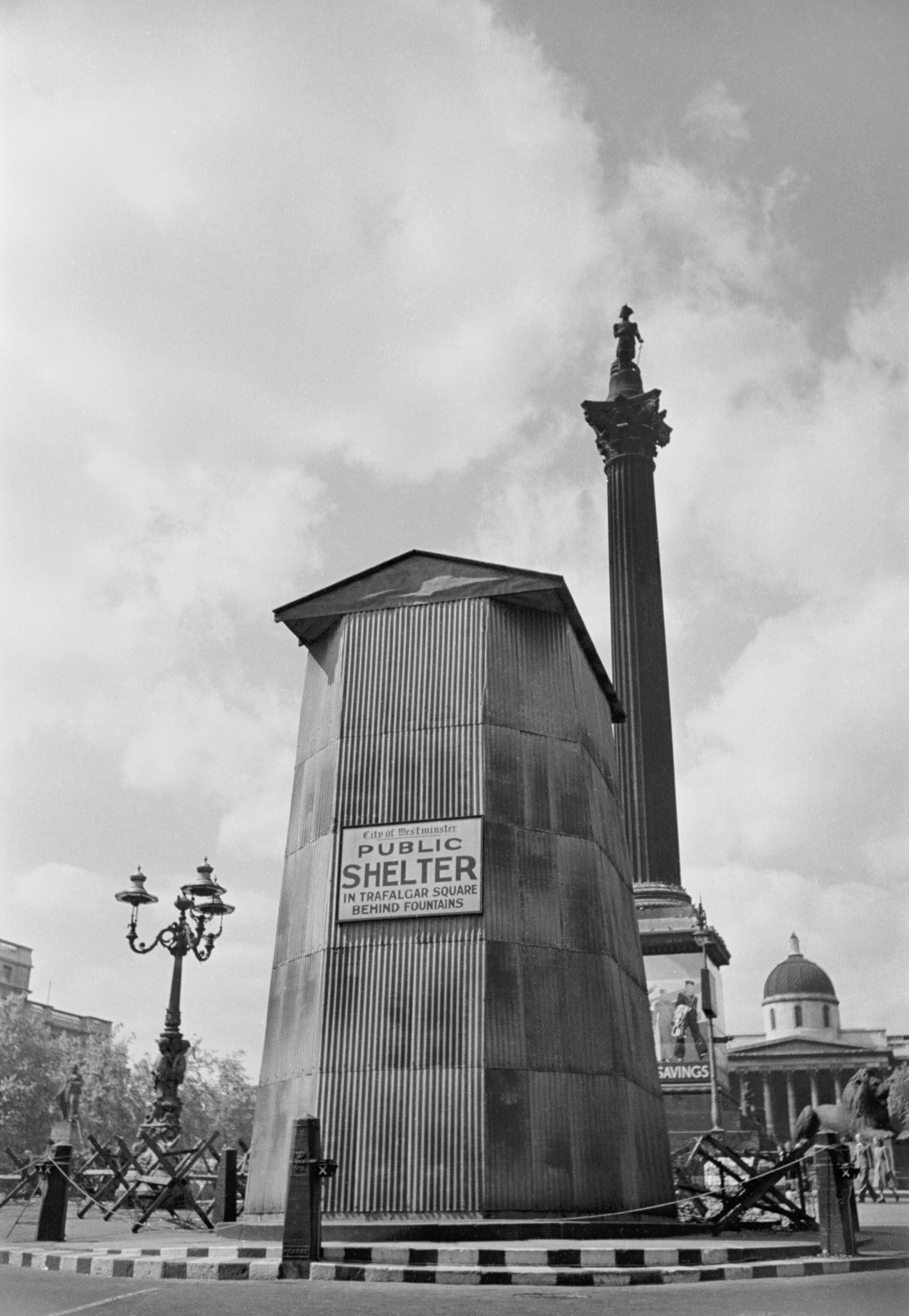
Encased equestrian statue of Charles I in Trafalgar Square with a notice giving directions to the nearest public air raid shelter

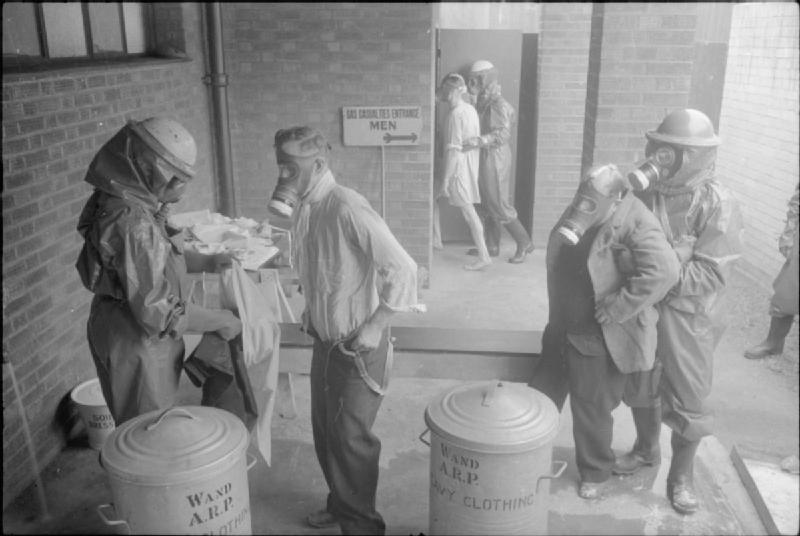
Training exercise at a Gas Cleansing Centre, Wandsworth, London, England, 1941

== See also ==
- Air raid siren
- Air raid shelter
- Auxiliary Fire Service
- Civil Defence Service
- Strategic bombing during World War II
- The Blitz
