= Black Horse, South Mimms =

Pub in South Mimms, Hertfordshire, England

Coordinates: 51°41′58″N 0°14′06″W

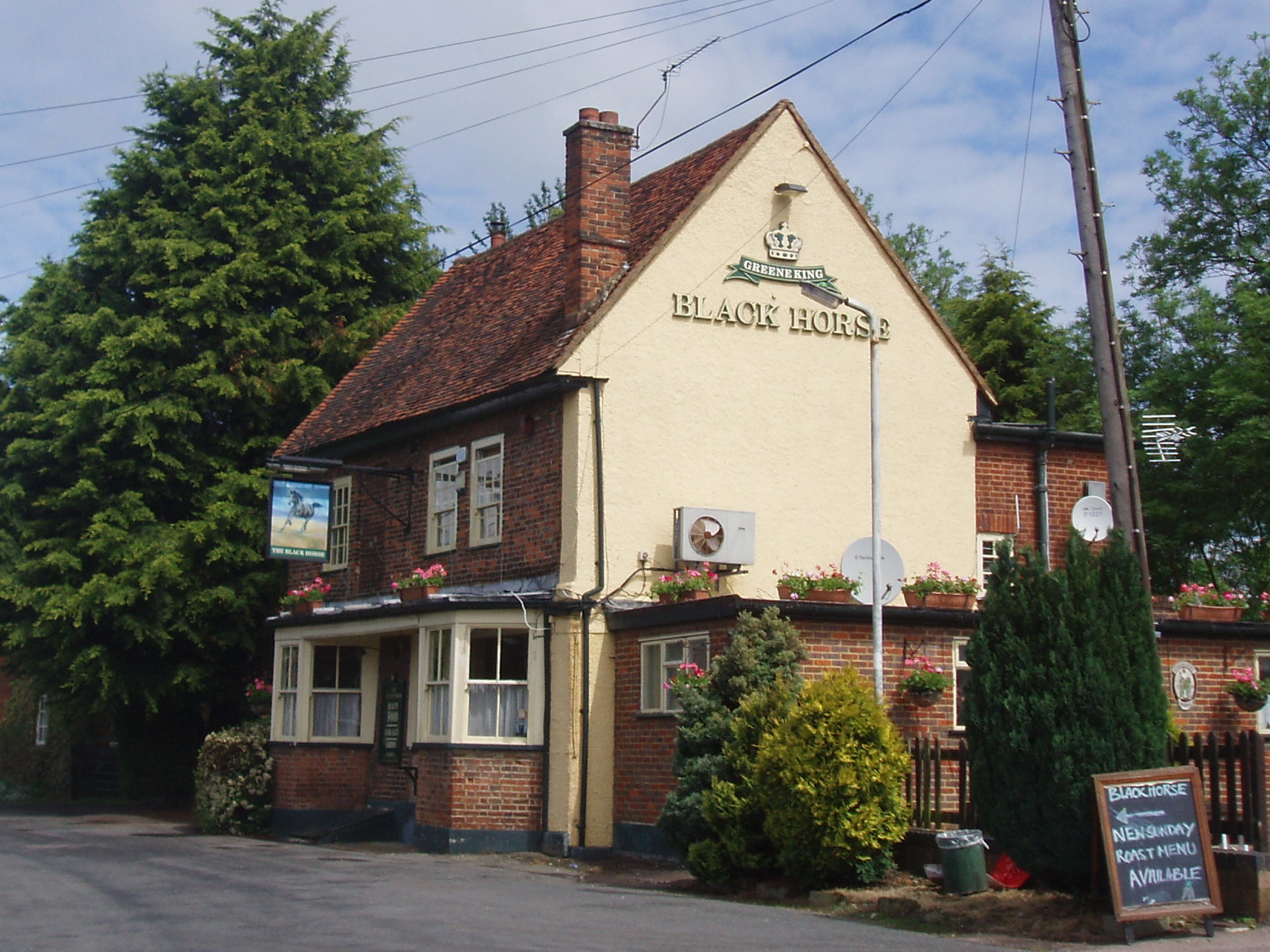
The Black Horse

The Black Horse is a Grade II listed public house on Blackhorse Lane in South Mimms, Hertfordshire, England.

== History ==
The pub can be dated to the 1700s, and is of red brick with a tiled roof. It has been kept in its original style, with traditional decor and original bay windows. In 1874, the licensee was William Marle. The pub was sold by auction in 1854. When a local resident was shot by her fiancé in July 1970, the landlord set up a fund to allow her to go on holiday after she left hospital, but died before being able to go. The building was made Grade II listed on 12 August 1985. Blackhorse Lane, which may be named after the pub, is the lane along which South Mimms developed, and was historically part of the main road to Holyhead.

== Geography ==
The surrounding area has historically been and remains rural.
