= Elstree Rural District =

History of Hertfordshire

Coordinates: 51°40′N 00°15′W

Elstree Rural District Barnet Rural District (1894–1941)
- Rural district
Coat of arms
- Area
  - 1911: 10,820 acres (43.8 km^{2})
  - 1974: 8,339 acres (33.75 km^{2})
- Population
  - 1901: 4,154
  - 1971: 31,565
- History
  - Created: 28 December 1894
  - Abolished: 31 March 1974
  - Succeeded by: Hertsmere
- Government
  - HQ: Council Offices, Shenley Road, Borehamwood
  - Motto: Do well and fear not
- Contained within
  - County Council: Hertfordshire

Elstree Rural District (until 1941 called Barnet Rural District) was a rural district in Hertfordshire, England from 1894 to 1974.

== Creation ==
The district had its origins in the Barnet Rural Sanitary District, which had been created in 1872, covering the rural parts of the Barnet Poor Law Union. Under the Local Government Act 1894, rural sanitary districts became rural districts on 28 December 1894. Where districts straddled county boundaries, as Barnet Rural Sanitary District did, separate rural districts were to be created for the parts in each county. The parish of South Mimms was in Middlesex, and became the South Mimms Rural District, whilst the rest of the Barnet Sanitary Rural District was in Hertfordshire and became the Barnet Rural District. Parishes which straddled urban and rural districts were also divided into separate urban and rural parishes, and so the old parish of Chipping Barnet was split, with its rural part becoming the parish of Arkley.

The district was renamed Elstree Rural District on 28 July 1941.

== Civil parishes ==
Over its existence the rural district consisted of the following civil parishes:

Parish	From	To	Notes
Arkley	28 Dec 1894	31 Mar 1905	Created 4 December 1894 from that part of Chipping Barnet parish outside the Barnet Urban District and East Barnet Valley Urban District. Ceded territory to Barnet Urban District in 1897, rest of parish transferred to Barnet Urban District on 1 April 1905.
Elstree	28 Dec 1894	31 Mar 1974	
Ridge	28 Dec 1894	31 Mar 1974	
Shenley	28 Dec 1894	31 Mar 1974	
Totteridge	28 Dec 1894	31 Mar 1914	Transferred to Barnet Urban District on 1 April 1914.

Arkley was transferred into Barnet Urban District in 1905. This made Totteridge an exclave of the Barnet Rural District. Nine years later, in 1914, Totteridge was also transferred into Barnet Urban District.

In 1935 a county review order amended the area of the district with 1,176 acres of Elstree, Ridge and Shenley transferred to Barnet Urban District; 392 acres of Ridge and Shenley transferred to St Albans Rural District; and 692 acres of Aldenham gained from Watford Rural District.

== Premises ==
The council originally met at the board room of the Barnet Union Workhouse at 17 Wellhouse Lane in Barnet, holding its first meeting there on 3 January 1895, when John Osmond, a farmer from Totteridge, was appointed the council's first chairman. He had previously been the chairman of the old Barnet Rural Sanitary Authority. The council continued to meet at the workhouse (later Wellhouse Hospital) until 1929, when the board room and committee rooms were needed to provide extra space for the hospital.

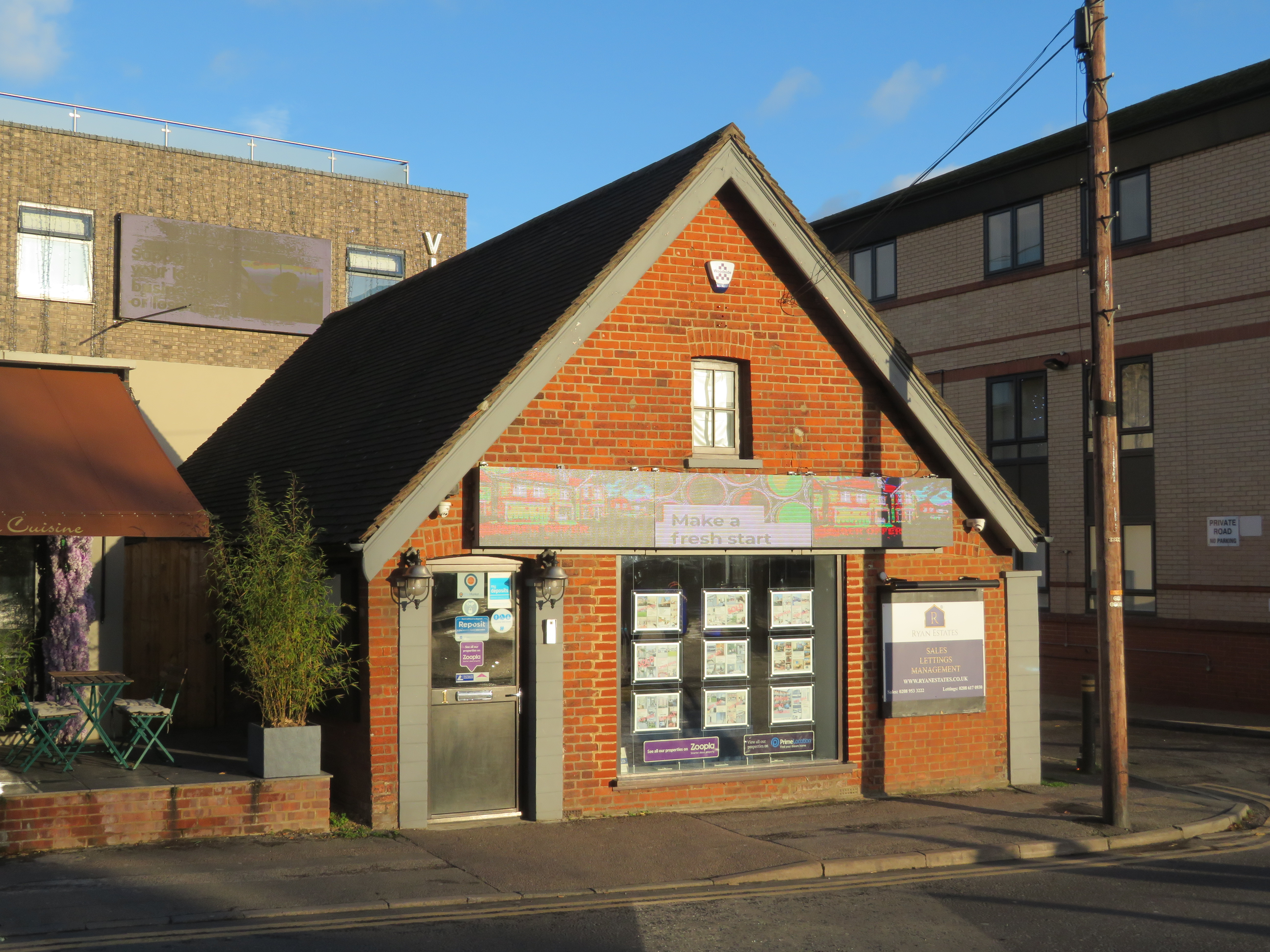
1 Station Road, Borehamwood: served as Council Offices in the 1930s.

The council left Barnet and found new offices in Borehamwood, which was rapidly developing into a small town, associated with the growth of Elstree Studios there. The council acquired a former Baptist Chapel at 1 Station Road, which had been built in 1894 and had briefly served as Borehamwood's first cinema, "The Gem", between 1914 and c. 1917. The small building was not large enough for the council and some functions were carried out at the offices of the solicitor who acted as clerk to the council, based just around the corner at 16 Shenley Road. The council later moved to new premises at 84 Shenley Road, which were built on former tennis courts behind a row of shops at 76–92 Shenley Road.

== Coat of arms ==
On 20 March 1957, Armorial Bearings were granted. The arms and crest are described as follows:

The background of royal ermine, represents the royal visits to and associations with the district, principally the visit of Henry VIII and his court to Tyttenhanger in 1525 to avoid the "sweatinge sicknesse" and the visits of Charles II to Salisbury Hall in Shenley. The oak tree with the Saxon crown represents Saxon Elstree – "Tidwulf's tree" – around which the district has grown. The tree also represents Boreham Wood and the district's woodlands, the gold acorns symbolize growth and prosperity. The waves at the base represent the River Colne, Aldenham Reservoir and link with the waves in the arms of the Hertfordshire CC and the Greater London Council.The gold saltire on blue is from the arms of the Abbey of St. Albans, the manor of Elstree came into the possession of the Abbey in 1188, and Tyttenhanger in Ridge stands on the site of a former possession of the Abbey, and the whole area lies in the Liberty of St. Albans. The scallop shells, the badge of pilgrims, recalls their passage along Watling Street through Elstree to St. Albans. The hart is from one of the supporters of the County Council arms, wearing a mural crown, symbol of civic government. The spool of film (unique in civic heraldry) recalls the industry which had made the name of Elstree and Boreham Wood so widely known in modern times. The motto is taken from the wall of Shenley Cage, and also links with the County motto "Trust and fear not".

== Abolition ==
Elstree Rural District was abolished under the Local Government Act 1972, becoming part of the non-metropolitan district of Hertsmere on 1 April 1974. The council's former offices at 84 Shenley Road were redeveloped shortly afterwards to become a Tesco supermarket, which in turn became a cinema and leisure complex in the late 1990s.
