= Barnet Urban District =

Former local government area in the UK

Coordinates: 51°39′N 0°12′W

Barnet
- Local Government District (1863–1894); Urban District (1894–1965)
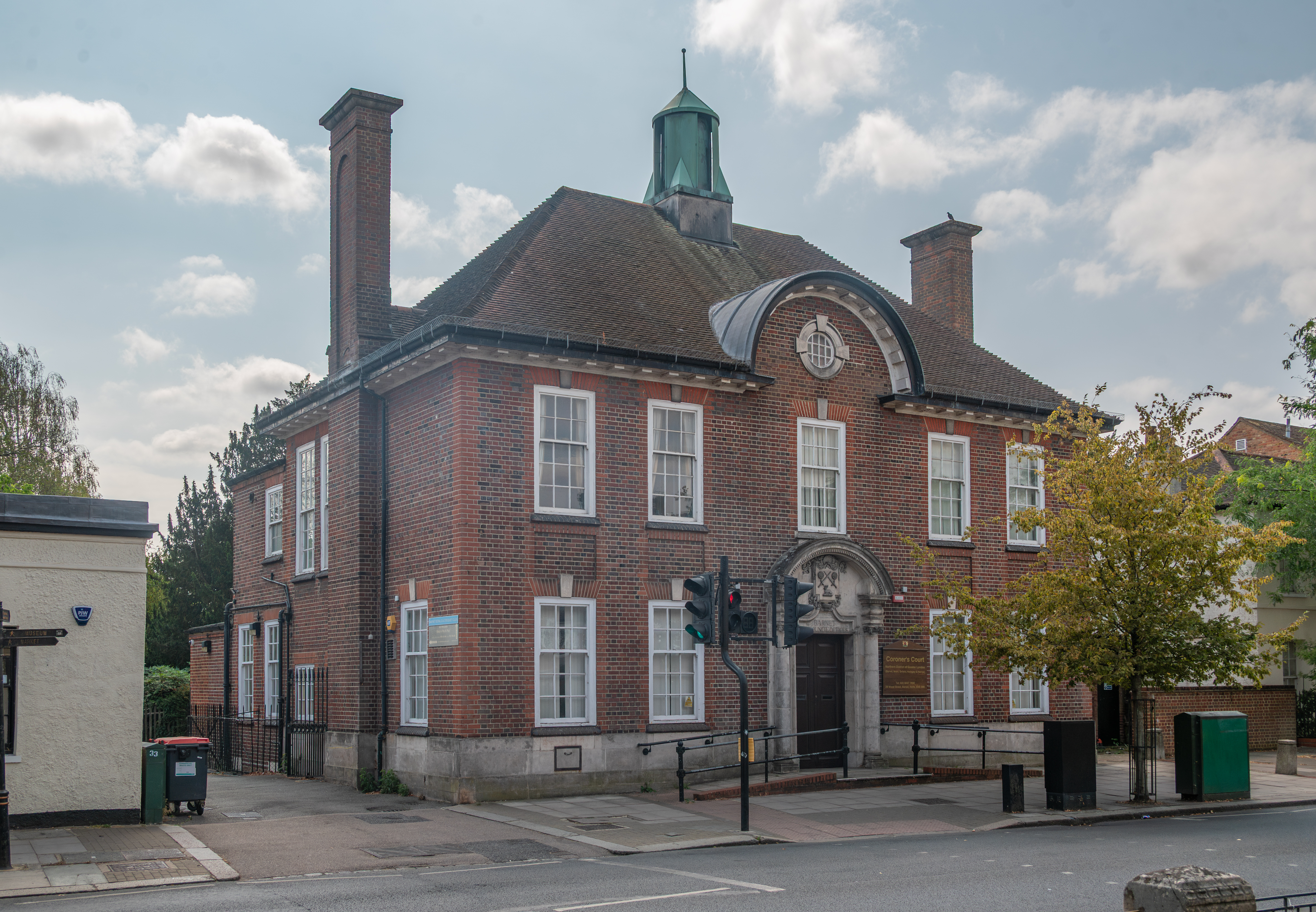
- Council's offices, now the North London Coroner's Court
- Area
  - 1911: 1,510 acres (6.1 km^{2})
  - 1931: 3,114 acres (12.6 km^{2})
  - 1961: 4,290 acres (17.4 km^{2})
- Population
  - 1911: 10,440
  - 1931: 14,726
  - 1961: 27,846
- Density
  - 1911: 6.9/acre
  - 1931: 4.7/acre
  - 1961: 6.5/acre
- History
  - Created: 5 October 1863
  - Abolished: 31 March 1965
  - Succeeded by: London Borough of Barnet
- Government: Barnet Local Board (1863-1894); Barnet Urban District Council (1894-1965)
  - HQ: 29 Wood Street, Barnet

Barnet was a local government district in south Hertfordshire from 1863 to 1965 around the town of Barnet.

== Creation ==
Barnet Local Government District was created on 5 October 1863, after the town's ratepayers decided to adopt the Local Government Act 1858, and it was governed by a local board. Under the Public Health Act 1872 local government districts were also designated as urban sanitary districts. The Local Government Act 1894 (56 & 57 Vict. c. 73) reconstituted the area as an urban district with effect from 31 December 1894, and the local board was replaced by an elected Barnet Urban District Council. The urban district was extended in 1905, 1914 and 1935.

== Civil parishes ==
The district originally consisted of parts of the parishes of Chipping Barnet in Hertfordshire, and Monken Hadley and South Mimms in Middlesex. The Local Government Act 1888 adjusted the county boundaries in 1889, so that the entire district was in Hertfordshire; forming part of a long, thin protrusion into Middlesex surrounded by that county on two sides, to the north and south.

The Local Government Act 1894 (56 & 57 Vict. c. 73) divided the urban district into three civil parishes:

- Chipping Barnet (from the part of Chipping Barnet parish in Barnet Urban District)
- Hadley (from the part of Monken Hadley parish in Barnet Urban District)
- South Mimms Urban (from the part of South Mimms parish in Barnet Urban District)

On 30 September 1896 the parish of South Mimms Urban (and therefore Barnet Urban District) was enlarged, gaining area previously in the parish of South Mimms (South Mimms Rural District). On 25 June the following year the parish of Chipping Barnet was also enlarged, gaining area previously in the parish of Arkley (Barnet Rural District).

In 1905 and 1914 respectively the parishes of Arkley and Totteridge were added, from Barnet Rural District. Rowley parish was added on 1 April 1935, created from area of the parishes of Elstree, Ridge and Shenley that lay east of the A1 in the Barnet Rural District.

== Abolition ==
Barnet Urban District was abolished by the London Government Act 1963 and its former area transferred from Hertfordshire to Greater London on 1 April 1965. Its former area was combined with that of other districts to form the present-day London Borough of Barnet.

== Politics ==
The urban district was divided into six wards for elections: Arkley East, Arkley West, Barnet North, Barnet South, Totteridge East and Totteridge West.

=== Parliament constituency ===
For elections to Parliament, the urban district was part of the constituency of:

- Mid or St Albans Division of Hertfordshire

In 1945 St Albans was divided as an emergency measure because its electorate exceeded 100,000 voters, with the urban district becoming part of the new constituency of:

- Barnet

== Gallery ==
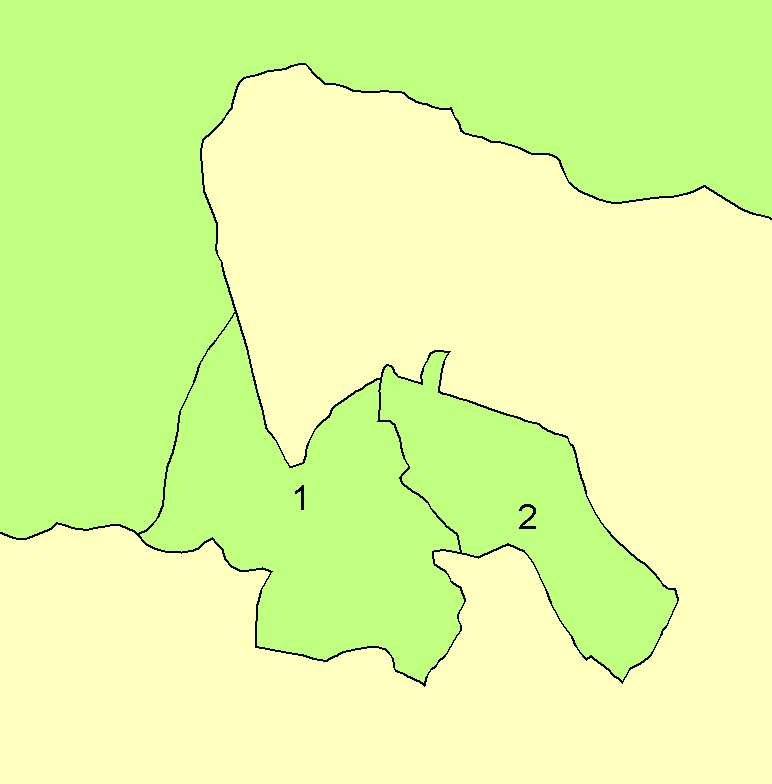
In 1961: 1 is Barnet and 2 is East Barnet

District in 1863.

District in 1894.

District in 1935.
