= List of Hertfordshire boundary changes =

Boundary changes affecting the English county of Hertfordshire. The county borders Buckinghamshire to the west, Bedfordshire and Cambridgeshire to the north, Essex to the east and Greater London to the south. Until 1965 it had a southern boundary with Middlesex.

== Summary ==
Apart from a number of minor exchanges of land with surrounding counties, the alterations in Hertfordshire's boundaries involved the following:

- The county had four exclaves that were integrated into their surrounding counties in 1844, and a set of six small enclaves of Bedfordshire was annexed.
- In the south, the boundary with Middlesex was somewhat complex, with Hertfordshire forming a long protrusion into it. In 1889 Hertfordshire gained some territory in this area and when Greater London was formed in 1965 the whole area, including Barnet and East Barnet, became part of the new county. Potters Bar in Middlesex was surrounded by Hertfordshire on three sides, and it was transferred to it in 1965, along with South Mimms.
- In the north, the town of Royston was partly in Cambridgeshire until 1896
- In the north west there were various irregularities in the boundaries with Buckinghamshire and Bedfordshire which were adjusted in the years from 1883 to 1897.
- In the south west the growth of the towns of Chorleywood and Rickmansworth necessitated an adjustment of the boundary with Buckinghamshire in 1906.
- More recently, the boundary with Greater London has been partially aligned to the M25 motorway.

== List of changes ==
Date	Legislation	Effect
20 October 1844	Counties (Detached Parts) Act 1844	Coleshill (part) transferred to Buckinghamshire; Meppershall (part) transferred to Bedfordshire; Studham (part) transferred to Bedfordshire; Shillington (part) transferred from Bedfordshire (six small enclaves) -listed on schedule as Ickleford in error
25 March 1883	Divided Parishes and Poor Law Amendment Act 1882, Local Government Board Order 19622	Parts of Drayton Beauchamp and Marsworth transferred from Buckinghamshire
25 March 1885	Local Government Board Order 16585	Part of Edlesborough (Hudnall) transferred from Buckinghamshire
24 March 1888	Local Government Board Order 21701	Part of Edlesborough transferred from Buckinghamshire
1 April 1889	Local Government Act 1888	Monken Hadley parish and parts of Enfield and South Mimms parishes transferred from Middlesex
30 September 1895	Local Government Board Order P 1170	The parish of Nettleden and part of the parish of Ivinghoe transferred from Buckinghamshire
30 September 1896	Local Government Board Order P 1173	The part of the parish of Royston in Cambridgeshire transferred from Cambridgeshire to become North Royston parish^{1}; Part of Bassingbourn parish transferred from Cambridgeshire to become South Bassingbourn parish^{1}; Part of Kneesworth parish transferred from Cambridgeshire to become South Kneesworth parish^{1}; Part of Melbourn parish transferred from Cambridgeshire to become South Melbourn parish^{1}
31 September 1896	Local Government Board Provisional Orders Confirmation (No. 13) Act 1896	South Mimms (part) transferred from Middlesex
30 September 1897	Local Government Board Order P 1312	Humbershoe and part of Houghton Regis transferred from Bedfordshire to Hertfordshire to form the new parish of Markyate
30 September 1897	Local Government Board Order P 1313	Part of Shillington parish transferred from Bedfordshire to Hertfordshire
1 October 1900	Local Government Board Order 41337	Parts of the Buckinghamshire parish of Ashley Green exchanged with parts of parishes of Bovingdon and Northchurch, Hertfordshire.
1 April 1907	Counties of Bedford and Hertford (Alteration of County Boundaries) Order 1906	Parts of parishes of Caddington, Hyde and Studham transferred from Bedfordshire; Parts of parishes of Flamstead, Harpenden Rural and Markyate transferred to Bedfordshire
1 April 1907	Counties of Buckingham and Hertford (Alteration of County Boundaries) Order 1906	Exchanges of small unpopulated areas: between the Buckinghamshire parishes of Ashley Green, Chalfont St Peter, Chenies, Denham, Gerrards Cross, Hawridge and Latimer with the Hertfordshire parishes of Chorleywood, Northchurch, Rickmansworth Rural and Wigginton
1 October 1926	Ministry of Health Provisional Orders Confirmation (No. 10) Act 1926	Minor exchanges between Ridge, Hertfordshire and South Mimms, Middlesex and Shenley, Hertfordshire and Hendon, Middlesex
18 September 1934	Ministry of Health Declaration under section 145 of the Local Government Act 1933 (Alteration of Watercourses)	Realignment of boundary with Essex due to alteration of watercourses.
1 April 1935	The County of Hertford Review Order (Ministry of Health Order No. 80168); The County of Essex Review Order (Ministry of Health Order No. 83994)	Transfer of small areas of Eastwick and Gilston to Essex
28 September 1947	Ministry of Health Declaration	Part of Arlesey transferred from Bedfordshire
13 August 1956	Ministry of Health Declaration	Part of Arlesey transferred from Bedfordshire
1 April 1965	London Government Act 1963	Potters Bar Urban District gained from Middlesex; Former area of Barnet Urban District and East Barnet Urban District transferred to Greater London^{2}
1 April 1989	The Cambridgeshire, Essex, Hertfordshire and Lincolnshire (County Boundaries) Order 1989	Transfers from South Cambridgeshire to North Hertfordshire (mainly to Royston parish)
1 April 1989	The Bedfordshire and Hertfordshire (County Boundaries) Order 1989	Transfers an area of 5·54 hectares from Kings Walden parish, North Hertfordshire to Luton, Bedfordshire
1 April 1993	The Greater London and Hertfordshire (County Boundaries) Order 1992	Southern part of Elstree village from Barnet/Harrow to the Elstree and Borehamwood parish in Hertfordshire; Some streets on the edge of Barnet town gained by Barnet from unparished area of Hertsmere, Hertfordshire
1 April 1993	The Essex and Hertfordshire (County Boundaries) Order 1992	Changes to Essex/Hertfordshire boundary
1 April 1994	The Essex, Greater London and Hertfordshire (County and London Borough Boundaries) Order 1993	Changes to the Greater London/Hertfordshire boundary: some alignment to the M25 motorway

== Notes ==
- ^1 These areas were merged with other areas to form the urban district and civil parish of Royston 1 October 1897 (Local Government Board Order 36,608)
- ^2 The area included the following places: Arkley, Barnet, East Barnet, Monken Hadley, New Barnet, Totteridge
