= Frederic James Edward Raby =

English scholar of Medieval Latin

Frederic James Edward Raby, CB, FSA, FBA (11 December 1888 – 30 October 1966) was an English Latinist, historian and government official. While working as a civil servant, he authored two seminal books on medieval Latin poetry which established his international reputation. After retiring from government work, he was a fellow of Jesus College, Cambridge (1948–55).

== Early life and education ==
Born in Ely, Raby was the son of Edward, a grocer with a classical education; the family moved to Hoole in Cheshire and Raby attended the King's School in Chester. He studied history at Trinity College, Cambridge, from 1907 to 1910, graduating with a double first.

== Career ==
=== Civil service ===
He passed the entry examinations for HM Civil Service in 1911 and was appointed to HM Office of Works; there, his tasks included organising the protection of ancient monuments. Taking an interest in archaeological excavations, he wrote pamphlets and guidebooks on several sites of national importance. In 1927, he was promoted to Assistant Secretary, at which rank he remained until retirement in 1948. In recognition of his work, he had been appointed a Companion of the Order of the Bath in 1934. He played an important role in organizing the WWII "Salvage Scheme," in which the Ministry of Works employed architects to provide timely first-aid repairs to bomb damaged historic buildings.

=== Scholarship and academia ===
Alongside his government work, Raby began his own researches; a project on the Holy Roman Emperor Frederick Barbarossa turned into an even larger one on Christian-Latin poetry. This became A History of Christian-Latin Poetry from the Beginnings to the Close of the Middle Ages (1927). He followed this up with the two-volume book A History of Secular Latin Poetry in the Middle Ages in 1934. He edited the poems of John of Howden (published in 1939). As the classical scholar Michael Lapidge has written, Raby "achieved an international reputation for his scholarship in the field of medieval Latin literature", which was "based principally" on his first two books.

Having in 1941 been appointed to an honorary fellowship at Jesus College, Cambridge, the Latinist Frederick Brittain (a fellow there) saw that after Raby retired from the civil service he was elected to a full fellowship at the college in 1948, which he held until 1955. During that time, he worked on revising Christian-Latin Poetry and Secular Latin Poetry. In his last retirement, he authored The Oxford Book of Medieval Latin Verse in 1959. Raby was elected a fellow of the Society of Antiquaries in 1923 (serving as one of its vice-president from 1940 to 1946) and a fellow of the British Academy in 1941. He was awarded the DLitt by the University of Cambridge in 1942. As Lapidge also wrote, Raby "put the study of medieval Latin poetry on a professional level" for the first time in England.

He died in 1966; his wife Joyce (née Mason), with whom he had two children, had died 24 years earlier.
