= Knightsland Farm House =

Farmhouse in South Mimms, Hertfordshire, England

Coordinates: 51°40′18″N 0°13′03″W

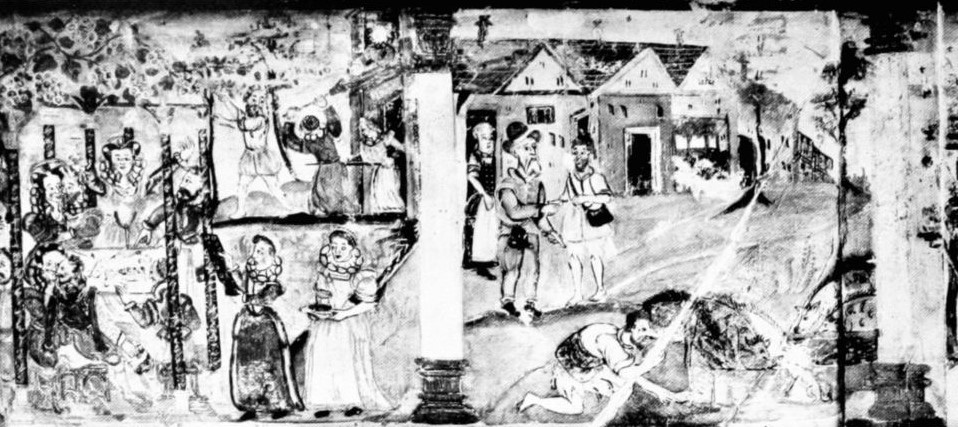
Knightsland Farm House wall painting

Knightsland Farm House is a Grade II* listed farmhouse in South Mimms in Hertfordshire, England. It dates from the 16th century, with later additions, and is timber-framed with a brick casing. The associated barn is also Grade II* listed.

The house is known for its four c. 1590–1610 wall-paintings on the first floor, depicting the parable of the Prodigal Son.
