= London Research Institute =

Biological research facility

Coordinates: 51.5153°N 0.1168°W

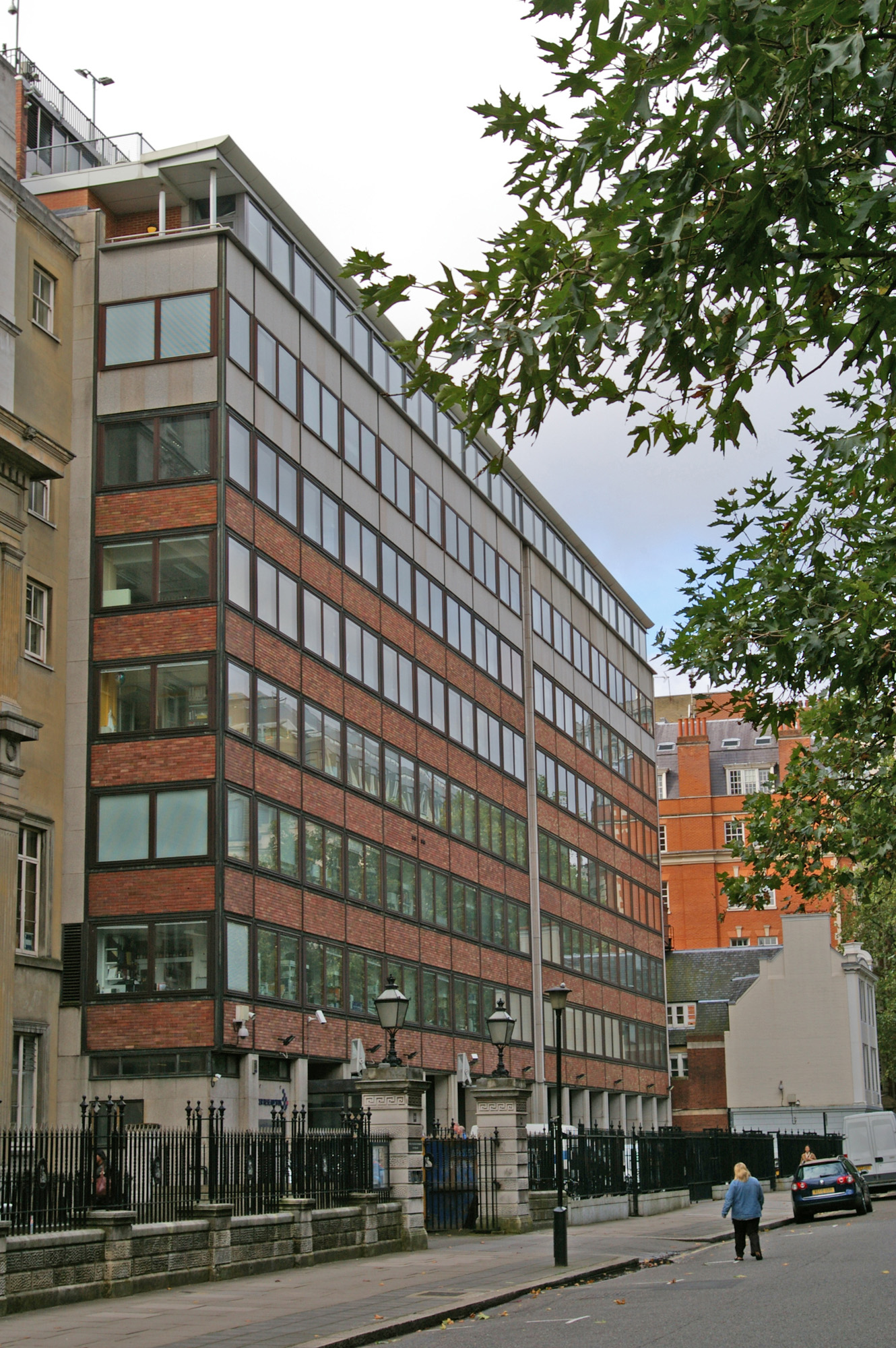
Cancer Research UK's London Research Institute, Lincoln's Inn Fields, London

The Cancer Research UK London Research Institute (LRI) was a biological research facility which conducted research into the basic biology of cancer.

The LRI officially became a part of the Francis Crick Institute ("the Crick") in April 2015, research transferred to the new Crick building in Somers Town throughout 2015 and 2016, and LRI fully closed in 2017, after 115 years of research.

== History ==
The LRI had its origins as the principal research facilities of the Imperial Cancer Research Fund (ICRF), which was founded in 1902 as the first specialist cancer research charity in the United Kingdom. When the ICRF merged with Cancer Research Campaign in 2002 to form Cancer Research UK, the LRI was the largest core-funded institute in Cancer Research UK's portfolio. At the time of its transfer to the Crick, the LRI housed 46 research groups based at two locations: Lincoln's Inn Fields (LIF) laboratories in central London, and Clare Hall (CH) laboratories on London's outskirts at South Mimms, Hertfordshire.

The LRI had an international reputation for cancer research. Themes of research included signal transduction (biology of tissues and organs, and molecular cell biology) and genome integrity (cell cycle and chromosomes and DNA repair). At the time of its transfer to the Crick, 11 of the scientific staff were Fellows of the Royal Society and two had received knighthoods. During its history, the LRI saw four of its researchers receive the Nobel Prize.

== Discoveries ==
=== Lincoln's Inn Fields laboratories ===
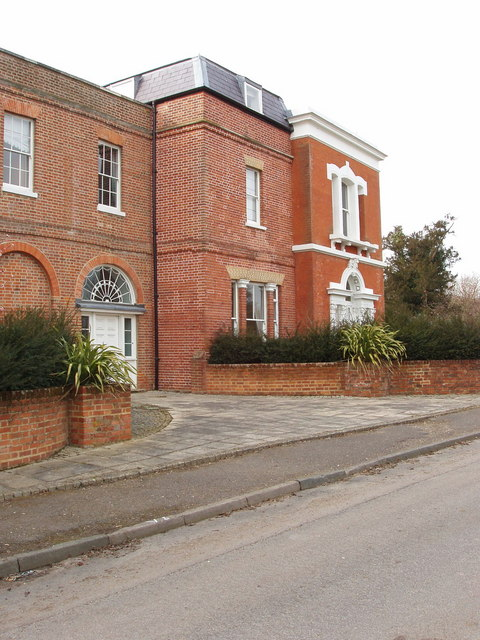
Clare Hall Manor, the LRI's other site

The laboratories are associated with a number of major scientific discoveries, including the discovery of the p53 gene, the link between growth factors and oncogenes; the identification of mammalian homologues of the cell cycle regulator cdc2; and the identification of the sex-determining gene SRY.

In 1975 Dr Renato Dulbecco, then Deputy Research Director of the Laboratories shared the Nobel Prize for Physiology or Medicine for his work on the interactions between DNA tumour viruses and cells. In 2001, the Nobel Committee again honoured the Lincoln's Inn Fields Laboratories with the award of a share of the Prize to Dr Paul Nurse, then Chief Executive of Cancer Research UK and a group leader at the Lincoln's Inn Fields laboratories for his work on the cell cycle.

=== Clare Hall laboratories ===
The Scientific Director of the Clare Hall laboratories was Dr John Diffley. The laboratories were housed on a purpose-built research campus adjoining Clare Hall Manor (a Grade II listed building) located approximately 15 miles to the north of central London in the Hertfordshire green belt.

The Clare Hall laboratories were officially opened in 1986. Under the guidance of Director Tomas Lindahl, Clare Hall became a leading centre for studies of DNA repair, recombination and replication, cell cycle control and transcription. In addition, the site provided scientific support services of increasing sophistication over the years.

Dr Tim Hunt, a Clare Hall Group Leader, shared the 2001 Nobel Prize in Physiology or Medicine with his Lincoln's Inn Fields colleague, Dr Paul Nurse.

Tomas Lindahl shared the 2015 Nobel Prize in Chemistry (with Paul L. Modrich and Aziz Sancar) for work on DNA repair.

== After closure ==
The Lincoln's Inn Fields building was sold to the London School of Economics and demolished in 2018 to make way for their new Marshall Building. The animal facility at Clare Hall was sold to UCL in January 2018, but as of January 2019 Clare Hall Manor itself and other laboratory buildings remained advertised for sale.
