= The Holly Bush, Elstree =

Former pub in Elstree, Hertfordshire, England

Coordinates: 51°38′44″N 0°17′52″W

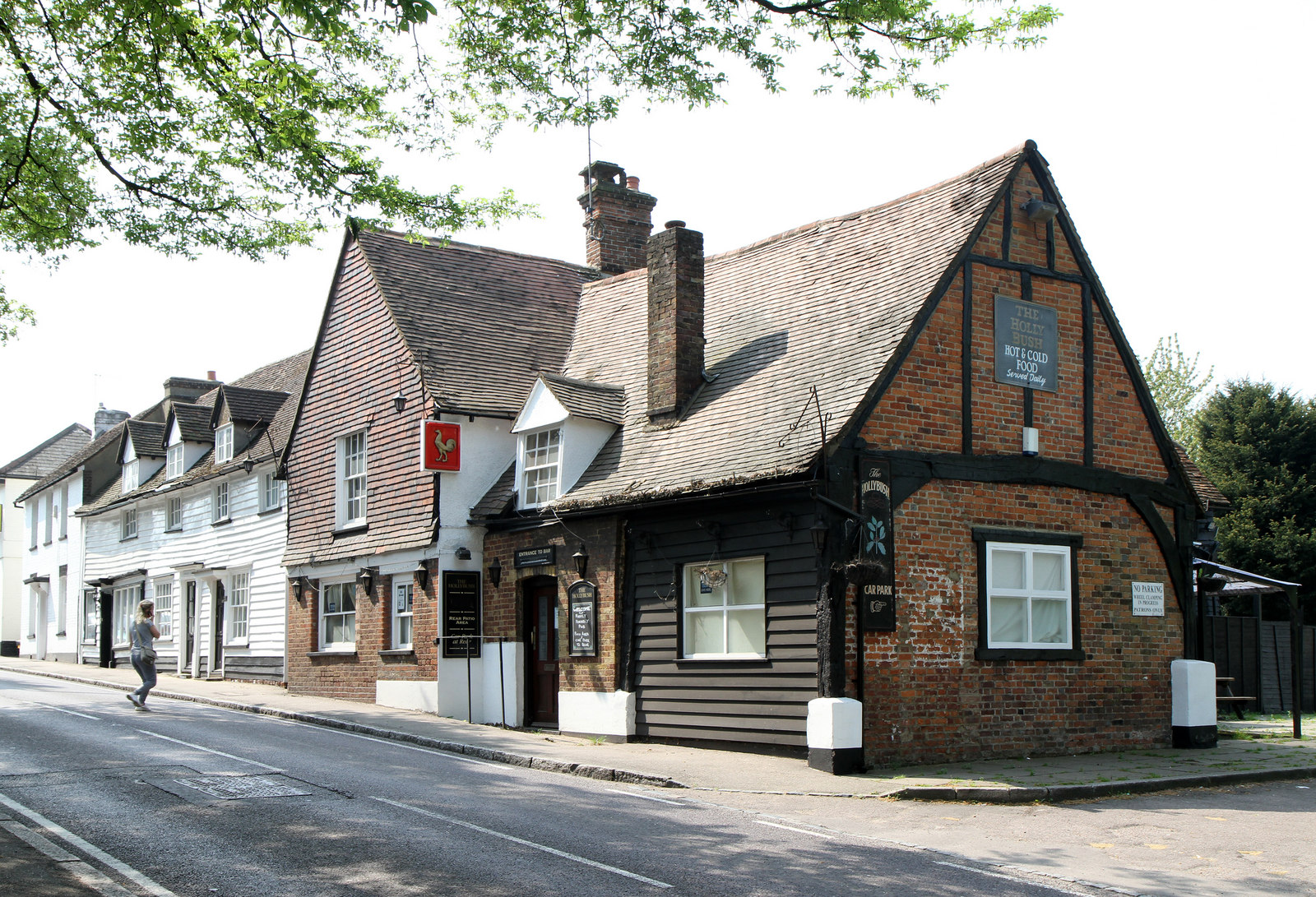
"The Holly Bush" displaying its signage in 2011. The golden cockrel was a symbol of the Courage Brewery

The Holly Bush is a listed building, was formerly a public house, on the High Street, Elstree, Hertfordshire, England. Elstree's High Street was formerly an important main road, the A5 which followed the course of the Roman road Watling Street.

== Architecture ==
The building is listed Grade II* listed. It is one of several late-medieval timber-framed hall houses in Elstree. It dates from the 15th century and was centred on an open hall. The hall is now two storeys; other modifications include a waggon way cut through the building. There is good interior timbering, including a crown post roof.

== Conservation ==
The building was listed in the 1970s while it was a pub. A conservation area protecting the pub and other buildings in Elstree was also designated in the 1970s. At the time, Elstree was divided between Hertfordshire and Greater London, and accordingly, the conservation area was designated by three local authorities, the London Boroughs of Barnet and Harrow, and Hertsmere Borough Council. Boundary changes in 1993 abolished this subdivision and united both parts of Elstree within Hertfordshire.

After the pub closed, planning permission was sought for conversion to residential use. This was modified to allow the ground floor to be used as a nursery.
