= Ashley Green =

Village in Buckinghamshire, England

Coordinates: 51.73°N 00.59°W

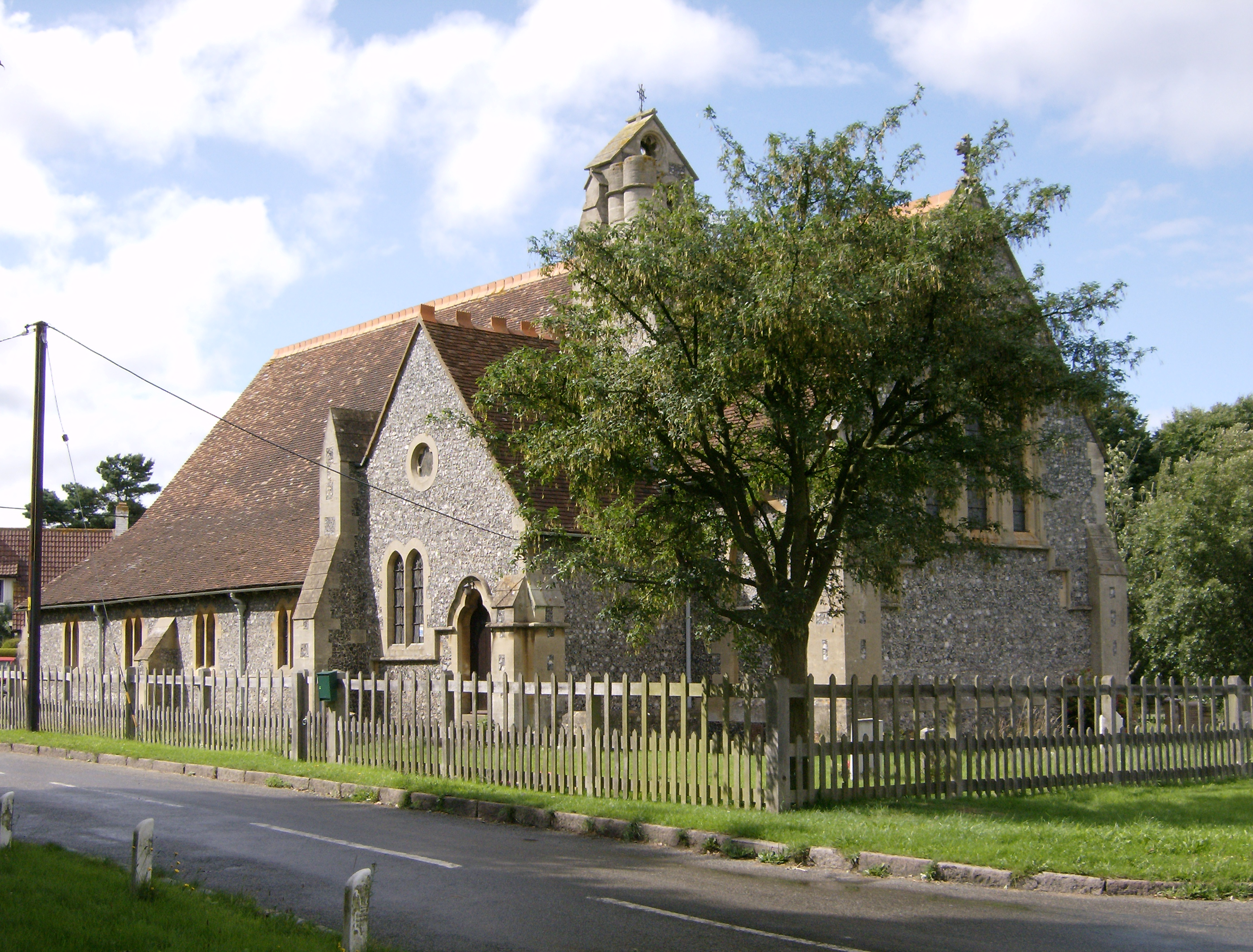
- St John the Evangelist Parish Church

- Location within Buckinghamshire
- Population: 980 (2011, including Orchard Leigh)
- OS grid reference: SP9705
- Civil parish: Ashley Green
- Unitary authority: Buckinghamshire
- Ceremonial county: Buckinghamshire
- Region: South East
- Country: England
- Sovereign state: United Kingdom
- Post town: CHESHAM
- Postcode district: HP5
- Dialling code: 01442
- Police: Thames Valley
- Fire: Buckinghamshire
- Ambulance: South Central
- UK Parliament: Chesham and Amersham

Ashley Green is a village and civil parish in Buckinghamshire, England. The parish is on the boundary with Hertfordshire, midway between Chesham and Berkhamsted.

Originally a hamlet within Chesham parish, its toponym is derived from the Old English for Ash Field, referring to the forest that once covered this part of the Chiltern Hills.

== Churches ==
Ashley Green used to have a Baptist church, situated down Hog Lane, which was a branch of Broadway Baptist Church in Chesham. It closed in the early 1900s.

Anglican services started in the village school in 1872, led by Rev Pratt, vicar of St Mary's Chesham. Land for an Anglican church was given by Lord Chesham. The architect was G.E. Street and the contractor G. Cooper of Aylesbury Buckinghamshire. The total cost of the building was over £2,000 with the endowment being a further £6,000. The Church was built and endowed by the gift of Elizabeth Dorrien of Clifton, Bristol, in memory of her sisters and dedicated to John the Evangelist on 31 December 1873, although it was already in use when it was dedicated. Ashley Green became a separate ecclesiastical parish in 1876. Newspapers and coins were built into the pillar adjoining the pulpit. In 1980 the parish rejoined Chesham parish under a team ministry.

The Church is built of local knapped black flints with Bath stone dressings. There is a bellcote with two bells. There is a boiler house, and the church was originally being heated by "Hayden's hot air apparatus", now disused. The porch is on the Northern side of the building the front of which is an oak moulded archway, the timber being framed in red bricks - herringboned. The roof is of plain clay tiles. St. John's has stained glass windows from various makers including Burlison and Grylls, Kempe and Co., James Powell and Sons, C.E. Moore and A.L. Moore.

Some of St. Johns' pews used to have a note on them that stated:

The seats in this Church are entirely free and unappropriated. The Church Wardens look to the Congregation for the support through the offertory of the usual Church expenses.

The bellcote has two bells, one of a diameter of one foot seven and a half inches (49.5 cm) and the other of a diameter of one foot five inches (43 cm). John Taylor & Co of Loughborough cast them in 1874 and refurbished and re-hung in the early 1990s.

In 2010 a kitchen and toilet was installed in the Church. In keeping with the tradition of the original builders, a time capsule that included a newspaper and a photograph of the congregation was buried under the floor of the kitchen.

== Population ==
Today Ashley Green is a popular home for commuters and executives who commute daily to London. There are also many local residents who have lived and raised children who also continue to live in the village along with several farms surrounding the area.

== Local business ==
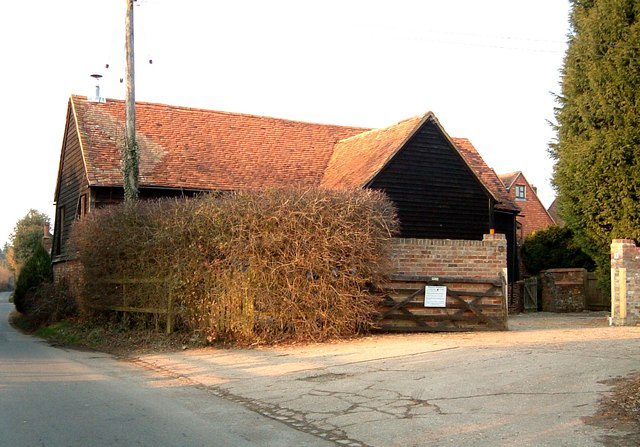
Hog Lane farm

Ashley Green has one public house, "The Golden Eagle", referred to locally as "The Eagle". On the junction of Chesham Road and Hog Lane the corner house used to be a shop and post office. An old post box still remains built into one of the entrance posts. There is a "farm shop" at John's Lane farm and the Chesham side of the village has a farm selling free range eggs.

== Community facilities ==
The old school is used by a playgroup youth club and for ballet classes. The village hall also hosts regular events such as the village fete and for rehearsals by local actors who put on productions around the local area. Behind the village hall in The Glebe there is a play park. There is a well on the village green outside the entrance gates to the old school.

== Media ==
Ashley Village School was the subject of a documentary film (Village School 1940) directed by John Eldridge. The film is a tribute to Britain's women teachers in wartime.

The film 'starred' Mrs. James the headmistress of the school and Mrs. Glover the other teacher at the school. Many of the pupils are shown taking part in school activities both indoors and outdoors. Some of the pupils were evacuees.
