= The Leys, Elstree =

Historic building in England

The Leys
- Interactive map of The Leys
- 51.6404°N 0.2914°W
- Location: Barnet Lane, Elstree, Hertfordshire, England

History
- Built: 1901; wing added 1923

Site notes
- Architect: George Henry Walton
- Architectural styles: Glasgow School / Arts and Crafts

Listed Building – Grade II*
- Official name: The Leys
- Designated: 7 June 1995
- Reference no.: 1263392

The Leys in Barnet Lane, Elstree, Hertfordshire, is an architecturally notable house that is grade II* listed with Historic England. It was designed by the Scottish architect George Henry Walton and built in 1901, with a further wing added in 1923, for the photographer and photographic-paper manufacturer James Booker Blakemore Wellington. Three further structures within the grounds — the entrance gates, a coach house, and a lodge — are separately listed at Grade II.

== History ==
The Leys was built in 1901 to a design by George Henry Walton (1867–1933), a Glasgow-born decorator and architect associated with the Glasgow School and the wider Arts and Crafts movement. One antiques-dealer biography of Walton describes The Leys as his first house design, commissioned after he had already built a reputation in London as an interior decorator, including work for Kodak shops — a claim not corroborated by the Historic England listing or the University of Glasgow archive. Walton returned to enlarge the house with an additional wing in 1923.

The house was built for James Booker Blakemore Wellington (1858–1939), a pictorial photographer who had worked with George Eastman on the early Kodak business before founding the photographic-paper manufacturer Wellington & Ward. Wellington lived at The Leys until his death in 1939; the Elstree & Borehamwood Museum holds glass lantern plates, photographic paper samples, and photographs relating to his business and to his time at the house. Following his death, Walton's original furniture and fittings for the house were dispersed. From 1947 the building was used as a residential home, first by Middlesex County Council and later by the London Borough of Barnet.

== Architecture ==
The Leys is built in the Glasgow School and Arts and Crafts style, with an orange-red brick ground floor and a pebbledashed upper storey above a moulded stone band, under a very steeply pitched plain tile roof with deep boarded eaves and lead hip flashings; the roof was re-tiled in the 1980s. The house stands on a U-shaped plan of two storeys and an attic, and its cast-iron rainwater hoppers carry heart motifs and the inscribed date 1901.

The symmetrical front elevation is arranged around a central semi-circular bay with leaded metal casement windows in a 2:3:2 pattern; the bay breaks through the main eaves in a flat-roofed, timber-framed section with brick herringbone panels and further leaded glazing. A projecting brick porch has a segmental leaded roof and double plank doors, each fitted with a heart-shaped light. The front originally had a three-bay arcaded loggia; this survives structurally but was enclosed and partly absorbed into a single-storey dining-room extension added in 1965, and the balcony above it was enclosed at the same time. Inside, the ground-floor kitchen retains some of its original 1920s tiling, and the first-floor billiard room, though since partitioned and fitted with an inserted ceiling, keeps its dark-stained vertical wall panelling.

Historic England's listing assessment describes the house as among Walton's best work and highlights it as a rare, largely intact example of Glasgow School-influenced design outside Scotland.

== Associated listed structures ==
Three further structures on the estate are separately included on the National Heritage List for England.

=== Entrance gates ===
The entrance gates to The Leys, in a Scottish Baronial style with circular rendered piers with conical brick-and-tile caps and timber-openwork, ledged and braced oak gates, were listed at Grade II in 1990.

=== Coach house and tower ===
The former coach house and stables, designed by Walton in 1901 and altered in the 1920s, were also built for Wellington. Arranged around a small courtyard on a U-plan, the red-brick, one-and-a-half-storey range has cast-iron rainwater hoppers matching those of the main house, a brick tower over its right-hand wing, and a courtyard paved in herringbone brick. It was later converted to garages and workshops and was listed at Grade II in 1995.

=== Lodge ===
A single-storey lodge and gardener's cottage, built around 1923 to Walton's design, stands near the entrance. It shares the main house's steep, hipped, plain-tile roof form, and is listed at Grade II in group with the entrance gates and as a subsidiary building to The Leys.
