= Elstree and Borehamwood =

Civil parish in Hertfordshire, England

Coordinates: 51.657°N 0.272°W

- Flag

- Location within Hertfordshire
- Interactive map of Elstree and Borehamwood
- Area: 5.315 sq mi (13.77 km^{2})
- Population: 41,423 (2021)
  - Density: 7,794/sq mi (3,009/km^{2})
- OS grid reference: TQ195975
  - London: 12 mi (19 km) SE
- Civil parish: Elstree and Borehamwood
- District: Hertsmere
- Shire county: Hertfordshire
- Region: East
- Country: England
- Sovereign state: United Kingdom
- Post town: BOREHAMWOOD
- Postcode district: WD6
- Dialling code: 020
- Police: Hertfordshire
- Fire: Hertfordshire
- Ambulance: East of England
- UK Parliament: Hertsmere
- Website: Elstree and Borehamwood Town Council

Elstree and Borehamwood is a civil parish in the Hertsmere district, in Hertfordshire, England. Located approximately 12 miles (19 km) northwest of central London and adjacent to the Greater London boundary, it is an urbanised parish with suburban residential development, some open land and light industry. Elstree and Borehamwood is a recent renaming of the ancient parish of Elstree, covering the settlements of Elstree and Borehamwood. Formed in 1894 as the Elstree Parish Council, the local council is Elstree and Borehamwood Town Council. One of the most populous civil parishes in England, at the 2021 census it had a population of 41,423.

== History ==
Elstree was an ancient parish in the Cashio Hundred of Hertfordshire. In 1894 it became part of the Barnet Rural District and the Elstree Parish Council was formed. Barnet Rural District became Elstree Rural District in 1941. The parish was part of the review area of the Royal Commission on Local Government in Greater London, however it did not form part of the proposed Greater London area. In 1974 the parish became part of the Borough of Hertsmere. The Local Government Act 1972 permitted parish councils to become town councils and provided a mechanism for the name of the parish to be changed if the district council was in agreement. The parish name was subsequently changed to Elstree and Borehamwood on 24 February 1982. The parish council became Elstree and Borehamwood Town Council.

The boundaries of Elstree and Borehamwood were adjusted on 1 April 1993 when part of the village of Elstree was transferred from Greater London, and the boroughs of Barnet and Harrow to Hertfordshire.

== Government ==
The local council is Elstree and Borehamwood Town Council. The council offices are located at Fairway Hall, Brook Close. The parish has thirteen councillors. It is divided into the five wards of Brookmeadow (electing three councillors), Cowley Hill (three councillors), Elstree (two councillors), Hillside (three councillors) and Kenilworth (two councillors).

== Geography ==
Map of the parish

The civil parish is 5.315 square miles (13.77 km^{2}). It is located approximately 12 miles (19 km) northwest of central London and is adjacent to the Greater London boundary in the south and east. It is predominantly residential development with some light industry and open land in the Metropolitan Green Belt. The parish includes the settlements of Elstree and Borehamwood, which are divided from each other by the Midland Main Line. For postal addresses, the parish is almost entirely within the Borehamwood post town and the WD6 postcode district. The Elstree telephone exchange building is within 12.5 miles (20.1 km) of Oxford Circus and subscriber numbers therefore use the 020 code.

== Transport ==
Elstree & Borehamwood railway station is located between the two main settlements on the Thameslink route from Bedford to Brighton via Central London. Although outside Greater London, the railway station is in London fare zone 6 for Travelcard and Oyster card fares, and the area is served by London Buses routes 107 and 292, providing connections to Arkley, Chipping Barnet, Colindale, Edgware and New Barnet.
