= Clare Hall Manor =

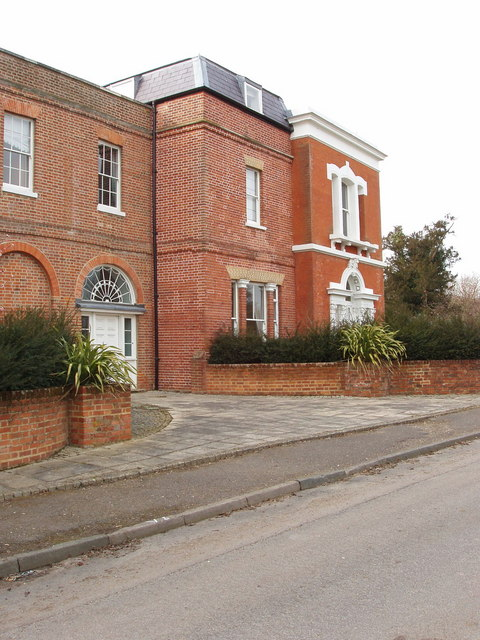
- Clare Hall Manor

- Shown in Hertfordshire

Geography
- Location: Blanche Lane, South Mimms, Hertfordshire, England
- Coordinates: 51.6877°N 0.2378°W

Organisation
- Care system: National Health Service
- Type: Specialist

Services
- Speciality: Tuberculosis hospital

History
- Founded: 1896; 130 years ago
- Closed: 1974; 52 years ago

Clare Hall Manor is a former health facility in Blanche Lane, South Mimms, Hertfordshire, England. It is a Grade II listed building.

== History ==
The estate was formed in the early 18th century. The house was built as a private residence in 1745 and became St Monica's Priory, a Roman Catholic nunnery, in 1886. In 1896 the house was converted into a hospital so allowing the transfer of smallpox treatment services from Highgate Hospital; the new facility became known as Clare Hall Hospital. Following substantial progress towards eradication of smallpox, the hospital converted to the treatment of tuberculosis patients in 1912 and became Clare Hall Sanatorium in 1929.

In 1938, a series of brick huts, operated as part of the Emergency Medical Service, was built on the opposite side of Blanche Lane and were in use throughout the Second World War. It joined the National Health Service as Clare Hall Hospital in 1948.

After the hospital closed in 1974, the buildings were acquired by the London Research Institute which carried out biotechnological research at the manor. After research services transferred to the Francis Crick Institute in 2015, Clare Hall was advertised for sale.
