= Frederick Brittain =

English Latinist (1893–1969)

Frederick Brittain (24 October 1893 – 14 March 1969) was an English Latinist.

Born on 24 October 1893 and educated at Queen Elizabeth's Grammar School in Barnet and Jesus College, Cambridge, Brittain studied medieval languages at university. After graduating, he taught privately and lived at the Oratory of the Good Shepherd in Cambridge before being elected to a fellowship at his old college in 1937. He was steward of the college from 1945 to 1954 and also served as its keeper of the records. He was also the junior proctor for the University of Cambridge in 1944.

His main academic interests were in Provençal and medieval Latin, and in 1946 he became the University of Cambridge's first lecturer in medieval Latin. He was awarded the DLitt from the university in 1948. His principle publications were Latin in Church (1934) and The Medieval Latin and Romance Lyric (1937); he also compiled The Penguin Book of Latin Verse (1962). Alongside works on Saint Giles (1928) and Saint Radegund (1926), he also wrote biographies of Sir Arthur Quiller-Couch (1947) and Bernard Manning (1942), books about South Mimms (where he lived and was Churchwarden), and a history of his college's boat club (1962, with H. B. Playford). He retired from his lectureship in 1961 and died on 14 March 1969. The main entry gate to the churchyard of St. Giles, South Mimms is dedicated to his memory.
