= Ridge, Hertfordshire =

Village in Hertfordshire, England

Coordinates: 51°41′N 0°14′W

Ridge
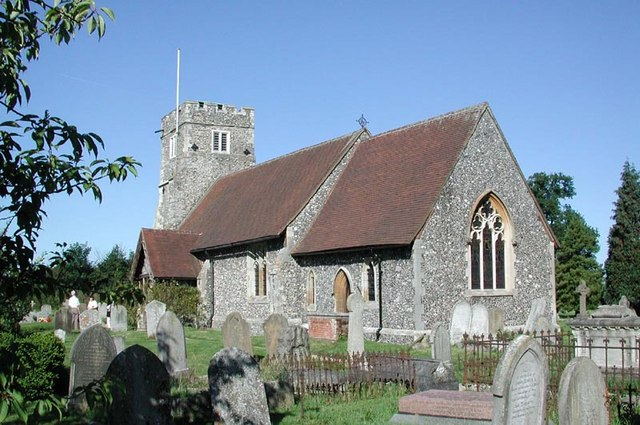
- St Margaret, Ridge

- Location within Hertfordshire
- Population: 192 (Parish, 2021)
- Civil parish: South Mimms and Ridge
- District: Hertsmere
- Shire county: Hertfordshire
- Region: East
- Country: England
- Sovereign state: United Kingdom
- Post town: POTTERS BAR
- Postcode district: EN6
- Dialling code: 01707
- UK Parliament: Hertsmere

Ridge is a village in the civil parish of South Mimms and Ridge, in the Hertsmere borough of Hertfordshire, England. It is situated between Potters Bar and Shenley. At the 2021 census the civil parish of Ridge had a population of 192. The parish was subsequently merged with the neighbouring parish of South Mimms in 2023 to form the new parish of South Mimms and Ridge.

It has a church, St Margaret's; a playground; and the Old Guinea public house, which serves food on most days. The village holds an annual fete on the August bank holiday. Ridge is surrounded by countryside with numerous public footpaths. In 1926, the parish boundary between Ridge, Hertfordshire, and South Mimms, Middlesex, was subject to a minor adjustment.

Clare Hall in Ridge is a former manor house, built around 1745 by Thomas Roberts, a linen draper from St Albans. It was originally called Clay Hall and renamed Clare Hall in 1750. From 1886 to 1974, Clare Hall was used as an isolation hospital for diseases including smallpox and tuberculosis. It was taken over by the Imperial Cancer Research Fund in 1980 as a research laboratory. It is now part of the Francis Crick Institute.

Field Marshal Harold Alexander, 1st Earl Alexander of Tunis, the World War II commander and former Governor General of Canada, is buried in St Margaret's churchyard.

On 1 April 2023 the parish was abolished and merged with South Mimms to form "South Mimms and Ridge".
