= South Mimms =

Village in Hertfordshire, England

Coordinates: 51.69889°N 0.22885°W

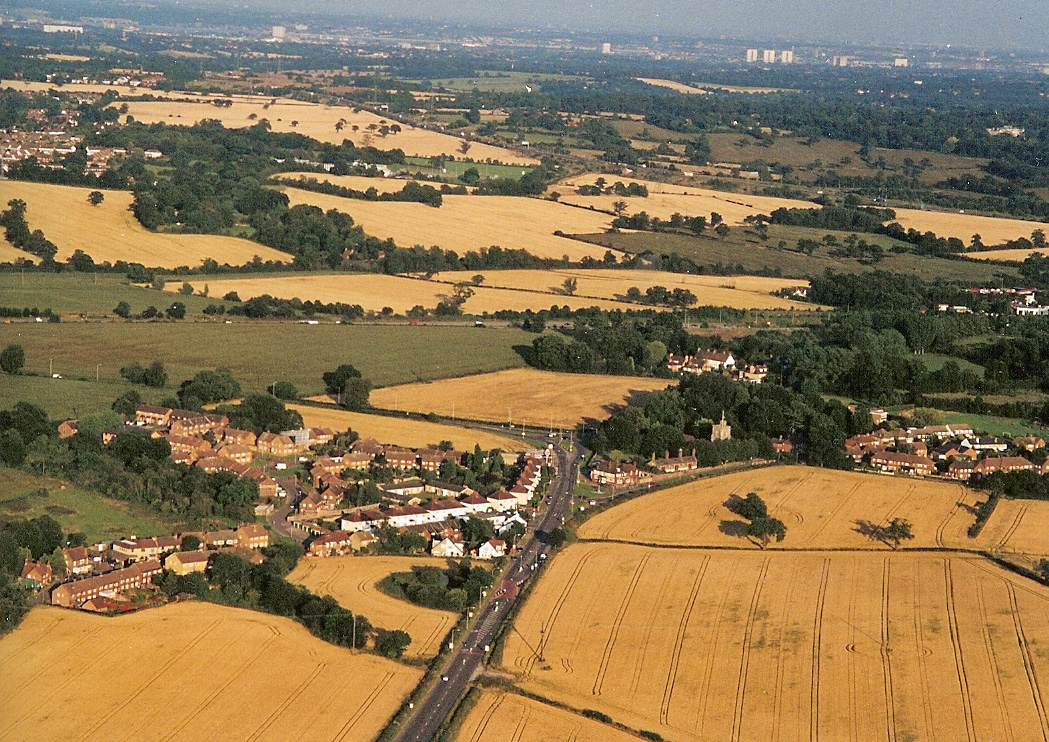
- Aerial view

- Location within Hertfordshire
- Population: 874 (South Mimms parish, 2021); 661 (Built up area, 2021)
- OS grid reference: TL225015
- Civil parish: South Mimms and Ridge
- District: Hertsmere
- Shire county: Hertfordshire
- Region: East
- Country: England
- Sovereign state: United Kingdom
- Post town: POTTERS BAR
- Postcode district: EN6
- Dialling code: 01707
- Police: Hertfordshire
- Fire: Hertfordshire
- Ambulance: East of England
- UK Parliament: Hertsmere

South Mimms is a village in the civil parish of South Mimms and Ridge, in the borough of Hertsmere in Hertfordshire, England. The village is near the junction of the M25 motorway with the A1(M) motorway; it gives it name to the South Mimms services at that junction. At the 2021 census the built up area had a population of 661 and the civil parish of South Mimms had a population of 874. The civil parish subsequently merged with the neighbouring parish of Ridge in 2023 to form the new parish of South Mimms and Ridge.

== History ==
The name Mimms or Mymms is thought to derive from the name of a tribe who once inhabited the area. South Mimms and neighbouring North Mymms are presumed to have anciently formed a single territory. Ownership of the territory appears to have fragmented by the time the area was divided into counties in the early 10th century, and the county boundaries were drawn to keep estates in one ownership in the same county. North Mymms was placed in Hertfordshire, whereas South Mimms was placed in Middlesex, of which it formed the northernmost parish. The Domesday Book of 1086 records that South Mimms was then owned as a detached part of the manor of Edmonton.Edmonton, London.

The name was spelled in a variety of ways historically. North Mymms was recorded in the Domesday Book as "Mimmine". By the 19th century the legal name of both civil parishes had settled on the spelling Mimms. In 1939 the official spelling of North Mimms was changed to North Mymms, but South Mimms retained its spelling of the name. Conversely, the Church of England uses the spelling Mymms for both its North Mymms and South Mymms ecclesiastical parishes.

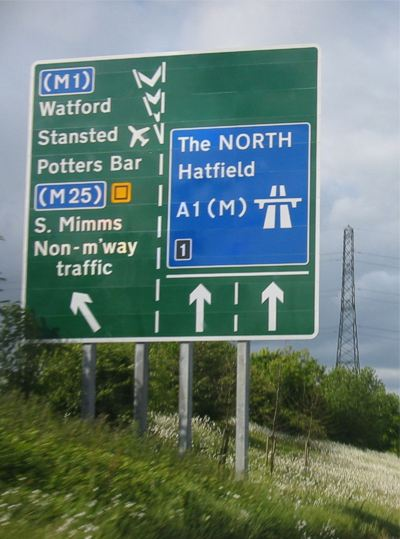
Sign at Junction 1 of the A1(M) at South Mimms

Potters Bar was originally a small settlement in the parish. Potters Bar railway station opened in 1850, after which Potters Bar grew to become the largest settlement in the parish. The station was renamed "Potters Bar and South Mimms" in 1923, but reverted to its original name in 1971.

The Grange, a country house in South Mimms, served as a home for Queen Wilhelmina of the Netherlands during her exile during World War II, from 1940. On 20 February 1944, a German air attack on South Mimms narrowly missed her, killing two of her guards, an incident mentioned in her autobiography. This prompted her move to a house near Reading.

Dancers Hill in South Mimms was the location of a World War II prisoner-of-war camp, Camp 33, that consisted of two compounds, both providing tented accommodation for prisoners.

Richmond Thackeray, father of William Makepeace Thackeray, was born in the parish and baptised in the church in 1781.

Clare Hall Manor, a former private residence, became a tuberculosis sanatorium in 1912 and then a research laboratory.

There is now only one public house, the Black Horse. The White Hart, adjacent to the church, remains closed and the future use of the site is uncertain. Both buildings date from the 18th century and are Grade II listed.

== Geography ==
Construction of the A6 dual-carriageway bypass, now part of the M25, began in November 1960. The bypass, built by Tarmac and costing £318,616, was 1.5 miles long. The bypass would complete the dual-carriageway approach to the M10, to the west. It was opened by Transport junior minister John Hay (Henley MP) on 26 July 1962. The former route is partly the B556. A roundabout was built at the southern end, which was redeveloped, being much larger in 1975, when a section of the M25 was added.

== Governance ==
There are three tiers of local government covering South Mimms, at parish, district, and county level: South Mimms and Ridge Parish Council, Hertsmere Borough Council, and Hertfordshire County Council. The parish council meets at both South Mimms Village Hall on Blanche Lane and at Ridge Village Hall.

=== Administrative history ===
South Mimms was an ancient parish in the Edmonton Hundred of Middlesex. In 1835 the parish became part of the Barnet poor law union, a group of parishes which collectively administered their functions under the poor laws. From 1863 the southern tip of the parish was included in the Barnet local government district. When elected county councils were established in 1889 under the Local Government Act 1888, such local government districts which straddled county boundaries were placed wholly in the county which had the majority of the district's population. The Barnet local government district was therefore placed wholly in Hertfordshire, after which South Mimms parish straddled the two counties.

Five years later, the Local Government Act 1894 established elected parish councils, reconstituted local government districts as urban districts, and established rural district councils based on the poor law unions. The 1894 Act also directed that parishes were no longer allowed to straddle district or county boundaries, and so the part of the old parish of South Mimms in Barnet Urban District became a separate civil parish called South Mimms Urban. The reduced South Mimms parish outside Barnet Urban District was the only parish in the South Mimms Rural District, which covered the rural parts of the Barnet poor law union which were in Middlesex. In 1934 the rural district was renamed the Potters Bar Urban District, with Potters Bar having grown to become its largest settlement. Only the district name was changed; the civil parish kept the name South Mimms, but as an urban parish it had no parish council.

When Greater London was established in 1965, the urban district of Potters Bar (containing the single parish of South Mimms) was transferred to Hertfordshire, unlike the majority of Middlesex which was incorporated into Greater London.

Potters Bar Urban District and the civil parish of South Mimms were abolished in 1974 under the Local Government Act 1972, becoming an unparished part of the new borough of Hertsmere. A new civil parish of South Mimms was created in 2008, covering a much smaller area than the pre-1974 parish, just covering the village itself and adjoining rural areas, and excluding Potters Bar.

On 1 April 2023 the civil parish of South Mimms was merged with the neighbouring parish of Ridge to form a single parish called "South Mimms and Ridge", combining within a single parish areas which had earlier been part of Middlesex and Hertfordshire respectively.

== St Giles' Church, South Mimms ==
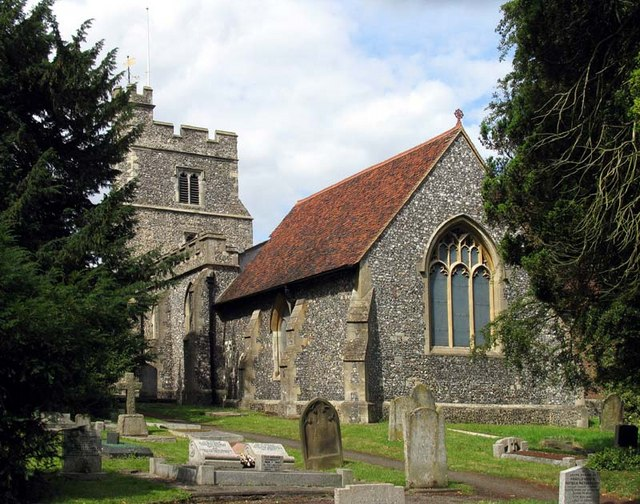
St Giles' Church, South Mimms

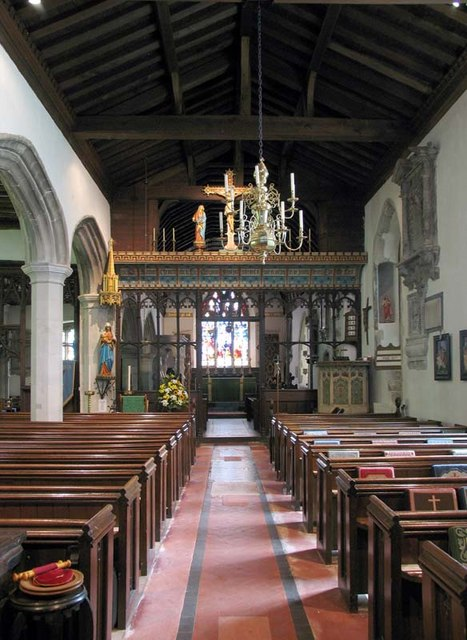
Interior of St Giles' Church, South Mimms

The Grade I listed parish church of South Mimms (usually spelt “Mymms” in this context) is dedicated to Saint Giles. It is situated on the west side of the village. It has a chancel with north vestry and chapel, nave with north aisle and south porch, and west tower. Except for the north aisle and chapel, which are partly of brick, the walls are of flint rubble with stone dressings.

The chancel, or at least its western part, is of the 13th century; the east end may be an extension of the earlier 14th century, the date of the east window. It is not structurally divided from the nave, which appears to have been rebuilt at the end of the 14th century, the date of the windows and doorway in the south wall. The three-stage tower was added c. 1450 and has a western doorway and an external stair turret. The north chapel and aisle, with their arcades of two and four bays, were built in the early 16th century and the latter was apparently complete by 1526, when the stained glass windows depicting its donors were in place. The whole church appears to have been richly provided with stained glass of the medieval period. The chapel, which may be a little older than the aisle, is enclosed by wooden screens decorated with the leopard's head badge of Frowyk. There was formerly a late medieval rood screen.

The chancel was in disrepair in 1685, when it was ordered that the communion table be railed in. By the 18th century all the medieval glass, except the lower part of four panels in the north aisle, had gone and the chancel, nave, and aisle had flat plaster ceilings. Then the walls and the screens of the Frowyk chapel were all whitewashed. There was a gallery for children at the west end, extending some way along both sides of the nave, and there were box pews, a lofty pulpit, and a reading desk. The royal arms were 'placed where the rood had been'. Externally, the south porch was of classical design and the tower was covered in ivy.

The lead roof of the nave was replaced by slates in 1823 and the gabled roof of the chantry by a flat leaded roof and a battlement before 1849. In 1846 a flint-and-brick wall was built at the west end of the church and Lord Salisbury, as lay rector, was asked to repair the chancel. In 1848 he still had not done so and the vestry resolved on legal proceedings. By 1876 the fabric was causing concern and the vestry accordingly appointed George Edmund Street to carry out a complete restoration. The church was re-opened in 1878, after the plaster had been stripped from the exterior, a south porch built, and a battlement added to the south wall to give height to the nave. Inside, the lath-and-plaster ceilings were taken out but the timber roof of the aisle was preserved; whitewash and white paint were removed, the box pews were replaced by oak ones based on the design of two which had survived from the 16th century, and a stone pulpit and an oak roodloft were installed. No stained glass had been introduced into the church since 1541, but in 1889 the central light of the east window was filled with Munich glass and in 1894 more stained glass was inserted.

In 1552 the church possessed a pair of organs. A barrel organ had been introduced in 1813, although the innovation was not welcomed by all the parishioners, and a new organ was built in the chantry in 1889. The square baptismal font dates from the 13th century and has 14th-century panelling on the pier. Its cover, designed by Sir Ninian Comper in 1938, is supported on four gilt pillars.

The notable collection of monuments includes 15th- to 18th-century brasses to members of the Frowyk, Ewer, Harrison, Hodsden, and Ketterick families, including one commemorating Thomas Frowyk (d. 1448), his wife, and nineteen children. Wall-monuments include an early-17th-century memorial, with a death's-head and carrying the arms of the Nowell family, and memorials to William Adams by Thomas Denman and Mary Dakin by William Spratt. There are 17th-century floor-slabs to the families of Norbury, Marsh, Howkins, Adderley, and Ewer, and a canopied altar-tomb with some Renaissance features, perhaps that of Henry Frowyk (d. 1527). In the north chapel there is a canopied tomb in an earlier style bearing the arms of Frowyk impaled with those of Throckmorton, Aske, Knollys, and Lewknor, and with an effigy of a man in armour adorned with the Frowyk leopard's head; it is probably that of Henry's son Thomas, who died by 1527. The churchyard contains a large monument to Sir John Austen, MP (d. 1742). Its entry gate is dedicated to Dr. Frederick Brittain (1893-1969), a distinguished classical scholar and former Churchwarden.

== South Mimms Castle ==
The remains of a motte and bailey castle are situated 1.25 kilometres northwest of the village, consisting of a circular mound about 9 metres high by 35 m across, in the corner of a kidney-shaped inner bailey about 125 m long. Traces of an outer bailey survive to the south of the site. The castle is thought to have been built by Geoffrey de Mandeville, 1st Earl of Essex in about 1141 during The Anarchy, a period of civil war between the forces of the Empress Matilda and those of King Stephen. The site was only identified in 1918 and was excavated in 1960-67 by Dr John Kent. These works found that the wooden keep, a large framed tower with tapered sides, had been built on the natural ground level and the motte had been piled up against it afterwards, using spoil from the ditch. The sides of the motte had originally been revetted with wood, so that only a timber wall would have been visible. Entrance to the tower was through a tunnel at the base of the motte. The castle was probably destroyed in 1143, but finds at the site suggest that occupation continued for a time afterwards. The castle remains are on private land and there is no public access, although a public footpath runs close to the site.
