= Pilditch =

Pilditch is a surname. Notable people with the surname include:

- Gerald Pilditch (1892–1956), South African World War I flying ace
- Philip Pilditch (1861–1948), British architect and politician

== See also ==
- Pilditch baronets
- Pilditch Stadium
