= Blaker (surname) =

Blaker is a surname.

- Ashley Blaker, British comedy writer and performer, radio and television producer and author
- Edward Blaker (1630–1678), English MP for New Shoreham
- Blaker baronets
- Peter Blaker, Baron Blaker (1922–2009), English Conservative politician
- Reginald Blaker (1900–1975), British Conservative politician
- Dick Blaker (1879–1950), British cricketer also known as R. N. R. Blaker
- Roderick Blaker (born 1926), Canadian politician

== See also ==
- Blaker (disambiguation)
