= Syd Bidwell =

British Labour MP (1917–1997)

Sydney Bidwell

Member of Parliament for Ealing Southall Southall (1966–1983)
- In office 31 March 1966 – 16 March 1992
- Preceded by: George Albert Pargiter
- Succeeded by: Piara Khabra

Personal details
- Born: 14 January 1917 Southall, Middlesex, United Kingdom
- Died: 25 May 1997 (aged 80) London
- Party: Labour
- Occupation: MP
- Profession: Politician

Sydney James Bidwell (14 January 1917 – 25 May 1997) was a British Labour politician.

== Early life ==
Bidwell was a worker on the Great Western Railway, and became a tutor and organiser for the National Council of Labour Colleges. He went on to become the London Regional Education Officer for the TUC. Having joined the Labour Party in his youth, in the 1940s he was also a member of the Trotskyist Revolutionary Communist Party. He was a councillor on Southall Borough Council 1951–55.

== Political career ==
Bidwell contested East Hertfordshire in 1959 and South West Hertfordshire in 1964. He was elected as Member of Parliament (MP) for Southall at the 1966 general election, and was elected for the largely similar seat of Ealing Southall in 1983.

In 1973, the Conservative government of Edward Heath introduced a statutory instrument; the Motor Cycles (Wearing of Helmets) Regulations 1973 (SI 1973/180); which made it compulsory for people to wear a British Standards-approved crash helmet when motorcycling. In January 1975, Bidwell moved a bill to exempt Sikhs from the instrument. He argued that as HM forces had always exempted Sikhs from wearing a helmet in combat, they should likewise be exempted from wearing a helmet while motorcycling. In November 1976, Bidwell's bill received royal assent and became Motorcycle Crash-Helmets (Religious Exemption) Act 1976.

Before the 1992 general election, Bidwell was de-selected as a candidate at the age of 75. When his appeal to the Labour National Executive Committee failed, he decided to stand as a "True Labour" candidate, but finished third behind the official Labour candidate Piara Khabra, with 9% of the vote.

== Sources ==
- Sydney Bidwell's parliamentary record: from 'Hansard
- Leigh Rayment's Historical List of MPs
- Bidwell's parliamentary career page

Parliament of the United Kingdom
Preceded by George Pargiter	Member of Parliament for Southall; 1966–1983	Constituency abolished
New constituency	Member of Parliament for Ealing Southall; 1983–1992	Succeeded by Piara Khabra
