= Southall (constituency) =

Parliamentary constituency in the United Kingdom, 1945–1983

- Former borough constituency for the House of Commons
- Boundary of Southall in Greater London for the February 1974 general election
- Borough: Southall Urban District; London Borough of Ealing

1945–1983
- Seats: one
- Created from: Uxbridge (re: bulk); Spelthorne (re: Harlington and Cranford)
- Replaced by: Ealing Southall
- During its existence contributed to new seat(s) of: Hayes and Harlington

Southall was a constituency from 1945 to 1983. It returned one member (MP) to the House of Commons of the UK Parliament. The Labour Party candidate won the seat at each general election and no by-elections took place.

It lay in local terms administratively in Middlesex, but from 1965, in the London Borough of Ealing.

After five years it shed roughly its western half to form a new seat, Hayes and Harlington. To compensate it took in Hanwell, and later further eastern additions – parts of Ealing.

== Results ==
Its voters, on the national first-past-the-post system, elected a series of three Labour Party candidates during its thirty-eight-year currency. Winning majorities ranged from 41.2% in 1945 - the landslide election for the party in which the seat included industrial Hayes to the west to 5.1% at the 1964 election which saw the start of the First Wilson Ministry when its second incumbent, Pargiter, who retired two years later, was aged 67. Its final winning majority (in 1979) was 21.5%.

Map that gives each named seat and any constant electoral success for national (Westminster) elections for Middlesex, 1955 to 1974.

== Boundaries and boundary changes ==
Dates	Local authority	Maps	Wards
1945–1950	Southall Urban District and Hayes and Harlington Urban District		The borough of Southall and Hayes and Harlington Urban District
1950–1974	Southall Urban District and Municipal Borough of Ealing (before 1965); London Borough of Ealing (after 1965)		The borough of Southall and the Hanwell North and Hanwell South wards of the Borough of Ealing.
1974–1983	London Borough of Ealing		Dormers Wells, Elthorne, Glebe, Northcote, Northfields, Walpole, and Waxlow Manor

=== 1945–1950 ===
The constituency was formed largely from the existing constituency of Uxbridge

=== 1950–1974 ===
The Hayes and Harlington Urban District was transferred to the new constituency of Hayes and Harlington and the Hanwell North and Hanwell South wards of the Borough of Ealing were transferred from the abolished constituency of Ealing West.

=== 1974–1983 ===
The Hanwell North and Hanwell South wards were transferred to Ealing North, while Southern parts of Greenford were transferred from Ealing North. Wards including Northfields and Walpole were transferred from the abolished constituency of Ealing South

=== Summary ===
In the first five years the seat was largest (containing Hayes, Yeading, Harlington in the west) The ward name Elthorne refers to the very large medieval hundred and, with minor parts of other wards in the same seat, took in Hanwell.

== Local government body change ==
The seat was in local terms for 20 years in Middlesex and for the following 18 years in London — a change in county took place in 1965.

== Constituency profile ==
The Quaker Oats Company built a factory in Southall in 1936. Part of the operation that made pet foods was sold to Spiller's in 1994, and the remainder to Big Bear Group in 2006. The site continues to produce brands such as Sugar Puffs. Other engineering, paint and food processing factories prospered for many years, mostly alongside the railway and/or canal. A collection of Martinware – Salt glazed pottery in stoneware, and birds – is on display at Southall Library

Southall was the home of Southall Studios, one of the earliest British film studios. It played a historic role in film-making from its creation in 1924 to its closure in 1959. There has been a locomotive works at the Southall Depot for nearly 150 years. Originally a Great Western Railway shed, it was possibly the last London steam depot, outlasting Old Oak Common and Stewarts Lane depots. The depot was later used for DMU maintenance and as a base for the electrification programme. Currently the site, now referred to as the Southall Railway Centre, is used by three independent groups, including Locomotive Services (where volunteers can contribute to the preservation and restoration of mainline locomotives).

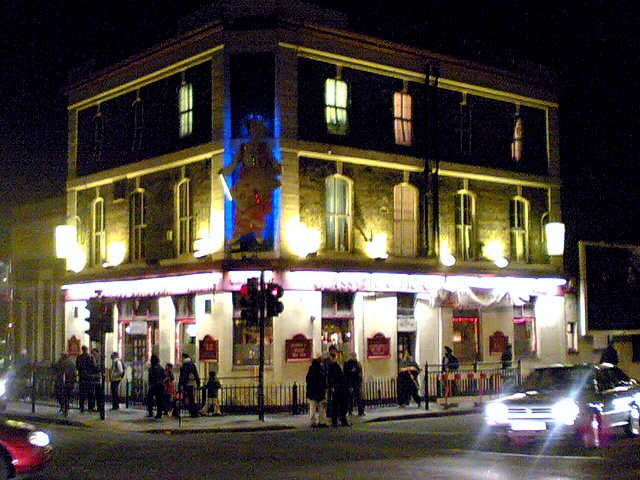
Glassy Junction pub, November 2005

The bus and commercial vehicle manufacturer Associated Equipment Company (AEC) was based in Southall, on a 25 hectares (62 acres) triangular site between Windmill Lane, the main Great Western Railway and the branch to Brentford Dock. The company moved there from Walthamstow in 1926 and closed in 1979 after losing market share whilst part of the giant but inefficient British Leyland group. The site was noticeable to railway passengers and to motorists on Uxbridge Road due to large signs proclaiming "AEC - Builders of London's Buses for 50 years".

A major gas works manufacturing town gas was between the railway and the canal. In 1932 a large gasholder was built which has been a landmark from far away. Painted on the north east side of the gasholder are large letters 'LH' and an arrow to assist pilots toward Heathrow Airport's (closed) runway "23" when making visual approaches. The letters were painted in the mid-1960s after a fraction of pilots at a glance mistook RAF Northolt (which has a smaller gasholder under its approach at Harrow). Northolt has a much shorter runway and is not suitable for very large aircraft; one Boeing 707 did land at Northolt by mistake and a number of other aircraft had to be warned off by air traffic control at the last minute. Since such gas production ceased in the 1970s upon tapping natural gas piped from the North Sea, much of the 36 ha (89-acre) site has been vacant, due to limited road access and remaining gas infrastructure.

The 1970s saw racial tensions in the area; in 1976 Sikh teenager Gurdip Singh Chaggar was killed in a racist attack. On 23 April 1979, Blair Peach, a teacher and anti-racist activist, was killed after being knocked unconscious during a protest against the National Front (NF). Another demonstrator, Clarence Baker – a singer of the reggae band Misty in Roots, remained in a coma for five months. More than 40 others—including 21 police—were injured, and 300 were arrested.

== Members of Parliament ==
Election	Member	Party	Notes
1945	Walter Ayles	Labour	Contested Hayes and Harlington following redistribution
1950	George Pargiter	Labour	Member for Spelthorne (1945–1950)
1966	Syd Bidwell	Labour	Contested Ealing Southall following redistribution
1983	constituency abolished: see Ealing Southall		

=== Elections in the 1940s ===
General election 1945: Southall
Party	Candidate	Votes	%
Labour	Walter Ayles	37,404	64.1
Conservative	George Baker	13,347	22.9
Liberal	Wilfred Wakefield	7,598	13.0
Majority		24,057	41.2
Turnout		58,349	74.2
Registered electors		78,649	
Labour win (new seat)			

=== Elections in the 1950s ===
General election 1950: Southall
Party	Candidate	Votes	%
Labour	George Pargiter	27,107	53.9
Conservative	Norman Cole	18,392	36.6
Liberal	Walter Andrews	3,917	7.8
Communist	J. A. Purton	839	1.7
Majority		8,715	17.3
Turnout		50,255	82.7
Registered electors		60,752*	
Labour win (new boundaries)			

*Note: major loss of territory to west to new seat, Hayes and Harlington

General election 1951: Southall
Party	Candidate	Votes	%	±%
Labour	George Pargiter	29,123	57.9	+4.0
Conservative	Humphry Berkeley	21,169	42.1	+5.5
Majority		7,954	15.8	–1.5
Turnout		50,292	84.0	+1.3
Registered electors		59,885		
Labour hold		Swing	–0.8	

General election 1955: Southall
Party	Candidate	Votes	%	±%
Labour	George Pargiter	25,207	57.2	–0.7
Conservative	Arthur Tickler	18,872	42.8	+0.7
Majority		6,335	14.4	–1.4
Turnout		44,079	76.5	–7.5
Registered electors		57,633		
Labour hold		Swing	–0.7	

General election 1959: Southall
Party	Candidate	Votes	%	±%
Labour	George Pargiter	22,285	52.7	–4.4
Conservative	Michael Underhill	19,966	47.3	+4.4
Majority		2,319	5.4	–8.9
Turnout		42,251	76.4	–0.1
Registered electors		55,290		
Labour hold		Swing	–4.4	

=== Elections in the 1960s ===
General election 1964: Southall
Party	Candidate	Votes	%	±%
Labour	George Pargiter	18,041	48.0	–4.8
Conservative	Barbara Maddin	16,144	42.9	–4.3
British National	John Bean	3,410	9.1	New
Majority		1,897	5.0	–0.4
Turnout		37,595	70.2	–6.2
Registered electors		53,558		
Labour hold		Swing	–0.2	

General election 1966: Southall
Party	Candidate	Votes	%	±%
Labour	Syd Bidwell	19,989	53.4	+5.5
Conservative	Barbara Maddin	14,642	39.2	–3.8
British National	John Bean	2,768	7.4	–1.7
Majority		5,347	14.3	+9.2
Turnout		37,399	70.8	+0.6
Registered electors		52,811		
Labour hold		Swing	+4.6	

=== Elections in the 1970s ===
General election 1970: Southall
Party	Candidate	Votes	%	±%
Labour	Syd Bidwell	19,389	53.7	+0.2
Conservative	Kenneth Reeves	15,166	42.0	+2.8
National Front	James Shaw	1,572	4.4	–3.1
Majority		4,223	11.7	–2.6
Turnout		37,399	64.5	–6.3
Registered electors		55,980		
Labour hold		Swing	–1.3	

1970 notional result
Party	Vote	%
Labour	24,500	49.6
Conservative	22,700	46.0
Others	2,200	4.5
Turnout	49,400	65.3
Electorate	75,660	

General election February 1974: Southall
Party	Candidate	Votes	%	±%
Labour	Syd Bidwell	25,726	49.9	+0.3
Conservative	Walter Gilbey	16,914	32.8	–13.2
Liberal	Ian Arnold	8,640	16.7	New
Anti-Helmet	Baldev Singh Chahal	310	0.6	New
Majority		8,812	17.1	+13.4
Turnout		51,590	73.4	+8.0
Registered electors		70,349		
Labour hold		Swing	+6.7	

General election October 1974: Southall
Party	Candidate	Votes	%	±%
Labour	Syd Bidwell	24,218	53.8	+3.9
Conservative	Robert Patten	14,235	31.6	–1.2
Liberal	Ian Arnold	6,557	14.6	–2.2
Majority		9,983	22.2	+5.1
Turnout		45,010	63.6	–9.8
Registered electors		70,818		
Labour hold		Swing	+2.5	

General election 1979: Southall
Party	Candidate	Votes	%	±%
Labour	Syd Bidwell	28,498	54.4	+0.6
Conservative	Robert Patten	17,220	32.9	+1.2
Liberal	Dick Hains	3,920	7.4	–7.1
National Front	John Fairhurst	1,545	2.9	New
Independent	Shambhu Gupta	637	1.2	New
Socialist Unity	Tariq Ali	477	0.9	New
Independent Businessman	Sohan Paul	115	0.2	New
Majority		11,278	21.5	–0.7
Turnout		52,412	71.7	+8.1
Registered electors		73,146		
Labour hold		Swing	–0.3	
