= Kwasi Kwarteng =

British politician (born 1975)

The Right Honourable Kwasi Kwarteng
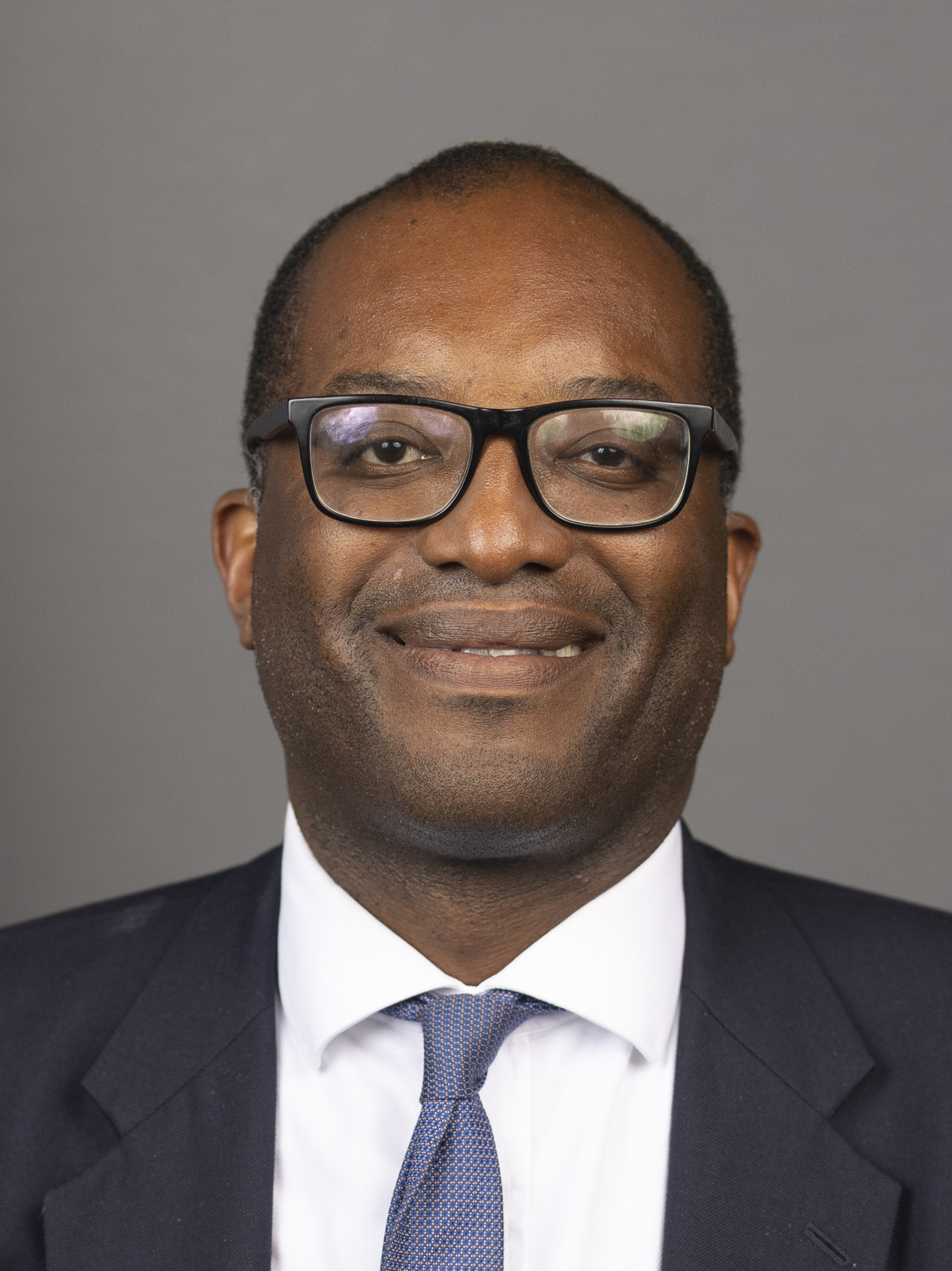
- Official portrait, 2022

Chancellor of the Exchequer
- In office 6 September 2022 – 14 October 2022
- Prime Minister: Liz Truss
- Preceded by: Nadhim Zahawi
- Succeeded by: Jeremy Hunt

Secretary of State for Business, Energy and Industrial Strategy
- In office 8 January 2021 – 6 September 2022
- Prime Minister: Boris Johnson
- Preceded by: Alok Sharma
- Succeeded by: Jacob Rees-Mogg
Junior ministerial offices 2018–2021
Minister of State for Business, Energy and Clean Growth
In office 24 July 2019 – 8 January 2021
Prime Minister	Boris Johnson
Preceded by	Claire Perry (Note: Perry went on leave of absence from 20 May 2019 with Chris Skidmore taking over in the interim until he was replaced by Kwarteng when Boris Johnson became Prime Minister in July 2019.)
Succeeded by	Anne-Marie Trevelyan
Parliamentary Under-Secretary of State for Exiting the European Union
In office 16 November 2018 – 24 July 2019
Prime Minister	Theresa May
Preceded by	Suella Braverman
Succeeded by	Office abolished

Member of Parliament for Spelthorne
- In office 6 May 2010 – 30 May 2024
- Preceded by: David Wilshire
- Succeeded by: Lincoln Jopp

Personal details
- Born: Akwasi Addo Alfred Kwarteng; 26 May 1975 (age 51) London, England
- Party: Conservative
- Spouse: Harriet Edwards (m. 2019)
- Children: 1
- Education: Trinity College, Cambridge (BA, PhD)
- Website: Campaign website

Academic background
- Thesis: The political thought of the recoinage crisis of 1695–7 (2000)
- Kwasi Kwarteng's voice Kwarteng promotes The Growth Plan, dubbed a "mini-budget" by the media Recorded 29 September 2022

Akwasi Addo Alfred Kwarteng (born 26 May 1975) is a British politician who served as the Chancellor of the Exchequer from September to October 2022 under Liz Truss and the Secretary of State for Business, Energy and Industrial Strategy from 2021 to 2022 under Boris Johnson. A member of the Conservative Party, he was the Member of Parliament (MP) for Spelthorne in Surrey from 2010 to 2024.

Kwarteng was born in London to Ghanaian immigrant parents and was educated at St Paul's Juniors, Eton College and the University of Cambridge where he was a student at Trinity College, Cambridge. He worked as a columnist for The Daily Telegraph and as a financial analyst before standing for election to the House of Commons. As a backbencher, Kwarteng co-authored a number of papers and books, including After the Coalition (2011) and Britannia Unchained (2012). In November 2018, Kwarteng was appointed parliamentary under-secretary of state for Exiting the European Union by Theresa May. After May resigned in 2019, Kwarteng supported Boris Johnson's bid to become leader of the Conservative Party. Following Johnson's appointment as prime minister, he appointed Kwarteng as the minister of state for Business, Energy and Clean Growth. In January 2021, Kwarteng was promoted to the office of secretary of state for Business, Energy and Industrial Strategy, a role he retained throughout the remainder of Johnson's premiership.

After Johnson resigned in 2022, Kwarteng supported Truss's bid to become Conservative leader. Following Truss's appointment as prime minister, she appointed Kwarteng as Chancellor of the Exchequer, becoming the first black chancellor. On 23 September, Kwarteng announced various tax cuts in a mini-budget that was widely criticised and which caused the pound sterling to fall to its lowest-ever level against the United States dollar. Kwarteng was dismissed as chancellor on 14 October after 38 days, making him the second-shortest-serving holder of the office. He was succeeded by Jeremy Hunt, who was retained by Rishi Sunak following Truss's resignation on 25 October. Kwarteng did not seek re-election as an MP at the 2024 general election.

== Early life and education ==
Akwasi Addo Alfred Kwarteng was born in the London Borough of Waltham Forest on 26 May 1975, the only child of Alfred K. Kwarteng and Charlotte Boaitey-Kwarteng, who had both emigrated from Ghana as students in the 1960s. His mother is a barrister and his father an economist in the Commonwealth Secretariat.

After starting school at a state primary school in Waltham Forest, Kwarteng was then privately educated, firstly attending Colet Court, an independent preparatory school in London, where he won the Harrow History Prize in 1988.

Kwarteng continued his private education at Eton College, where he was a King's Scholar and was awarded the Newcastle Scholarship prize.

He then studied classics and history at the University of Cambridge as a student of Trinity College, Cambridge, matriculating in 1993. He achieved a double first class degree, and twice won the Browne Medal. He was a member of the team which won the BBC quiz show University Challenge in 1995. At Cambridge, he was a member of the University Pitt Club, and has since returned to visit. He was a Kennedy Scholar for a year at Harvard University, and then earned a PhD degree in economic history from the University of Cambridge in 2000, with a thesis on the recoinage crisis of 1695–97.

== Early career ==
Before becoming an MP, Kwarteng worked as a columnist for The Daily Telegraph and as a financial analyst at JPMorgan Chase as well as at WestLB and the hedge fund Odey Asset Management. He wrote a book, Ghosts of Empire, about the legacy of the British Empire, published by Bloomsbury in 2011. He also co-authored Gridlock Nation with Jonathan Dupont in 2011, about the causes of and solutions to traffic congestion in Britain.

=== Early political career ===
Considered "a rising star on the right of the party" by 2015, Kwarteng initially became a Conservative candidate in the constituency of Brent East at the 2005 general election. He finished in third place, behind the incumbent Liberal Democrat MP Sarah Teather and the Labour candidate Yasmin Qureshi. Kwarteng was chairman of the conservative think tank Bow Group in 2006. In the same year, The Times suggested that he could become the first black Conservative cabinet minister. He was sixth on the Conservative list of candidates for the London Assembly in the 2008 London Assembly election, but was not elected, as the Conservatives obtained only three London-wide list seats.

== Parliamentary career ==
=== 2010 election and tenure ===
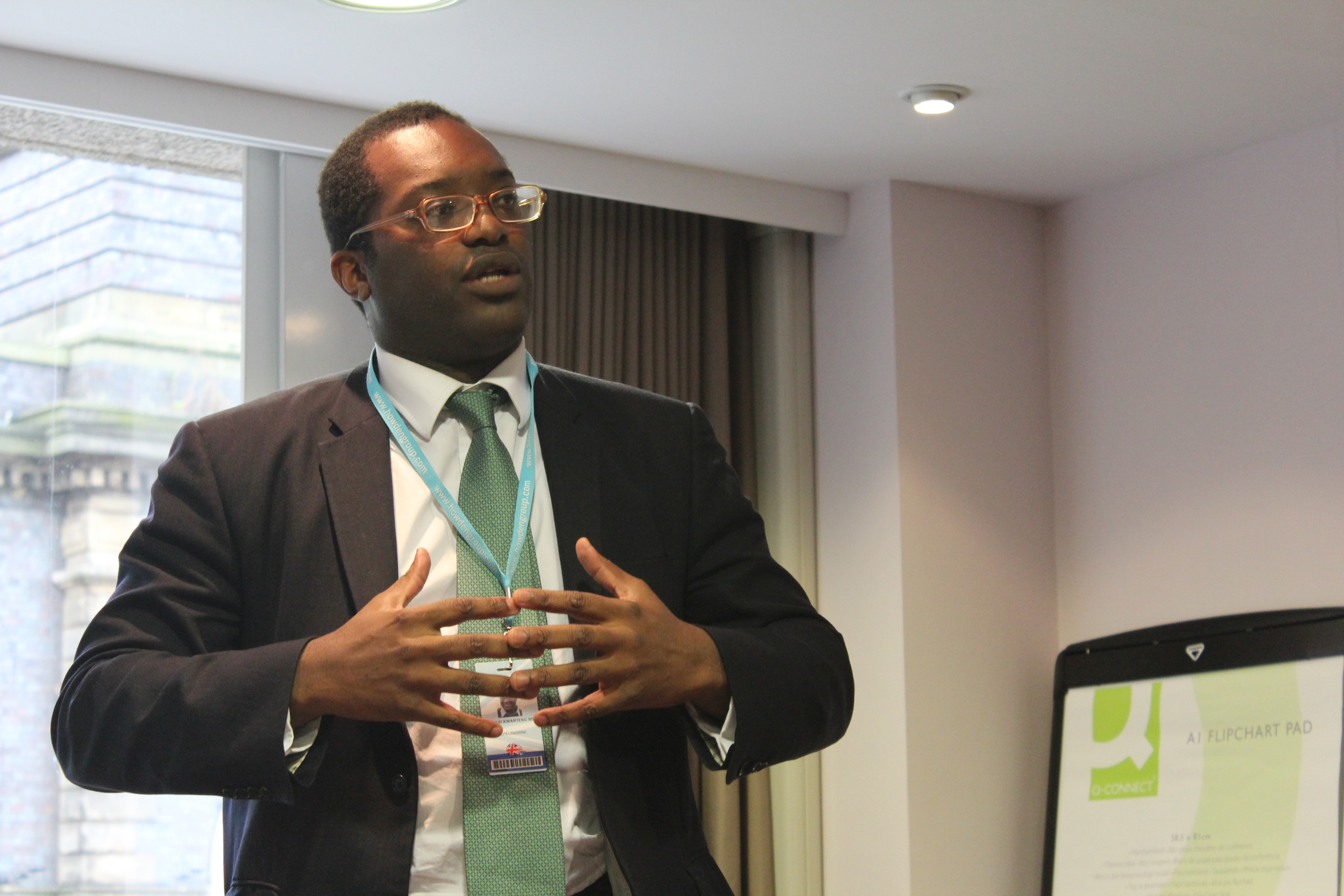
Kwarteng at a Policy Exchange event in 2012

Kwarteng was selected as the Conservative candidate for Spelthorne in January 2010, and won the seat with a majority of 10,019 votes (21.2%). Kwarteng did not vote on the backbench EU Referendum Bill in October 2011. In 2013 he described the Help to Buy housing scheme as "inflationary".

In March 2011 he registered that he would be paid "£10,000 on a half-yearly basis" for work as "Consultant to Odey Asset Management" in the House of Commons Register of Members' Financial Interests. Only one payment appears to have been made.

In 2014, his book, War and Gold: A Five-Hundred-Year History of Empires, Adventures and Debt, was published. It is a history of capital and the enduring ability of money, when combined with speculation, to ruin societies. In 2015, his next book, Thatcher's Trial: Six Months That Defined a Leader, was published.

Kwarteng was re-elected at the 2015 general election with an increased majority of 14,152 votes. Kwarteng backed the UK's withdrawal from the European Union in the 2016 referendum.

=== Early ministerial career (2017–2019) ===
At the snap 2017 general election, Kwarteng was again re-elected with an increased vote share of 57.3% but a decreased majority of 13,425. He was appointed Parliamentary Private Secretary to Chancellor of the Exchequer Philip Hammond. On 16 November 2018, Kwarteng replaced Suella Braverman as a minister in the Department for Exiting the EU.

Kwarteng supported Boris Johnson in the 2019 Conservative Party leadership election. After Johnson's appointment as Prime Minister, Kwarteng was appointed Minister of State at the Department for Business, Energy and Industrial Strategy on 25 July 2019 along with Jo Johnson, a brother of the Prime Minister. He was appointed to the Privy Council on the same day.

In September 2019, Kwarteng stated on The Andrew Neil Show: "I'm not saying this, but, many people are saying that the judges are biased", after the Court of Session ruled that Johnson's prorogation of parliament was illegal. Kwarteng added: "The extent to which lawyers and judges are interfering in politics is something that concerns many people." Defence Secretary Ben Wallace and the then Housing Secretary Robert Jenrick distanced themselves from his comments and defended the judiciary. Opposition MPs, the chair of the Bar Council, and the chair of the Law Society of England and Wales criticised his comments.

At the 2019 general election, Kwarteng was again re-elected with an increased vote share of 58.9% and an increased majority of 18,393.

=== Secretary of State for Business, Energy and Industrial Strategy (2021–2022) ===
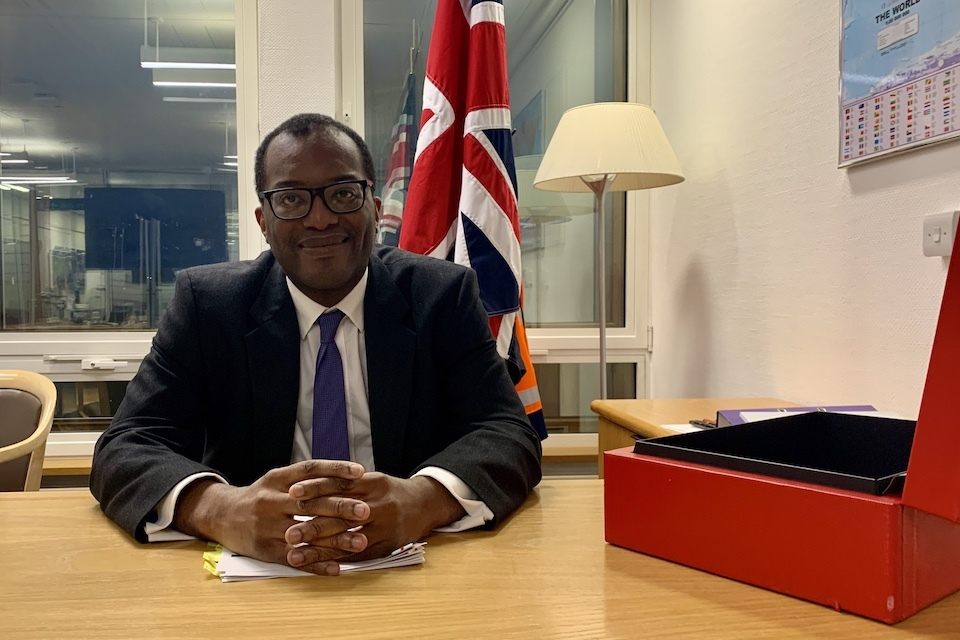
Kwarteng as Business Secretary, on 11 January 2021

On 8 January 2021, as part of a mini-reshuffle, he replaced Alok Sharma as Secretary of State for Business, Energy and Industrial Strategy. He committed the department to cutting global emissions to stop climate change.

==== Dissolving ISC ====
In March 2021, he was criticised for dissolving the Industrial Strategy Council, the advisory body seeking to regenerate Britain's regions. In the days after the COP26 climate summit, Kwarteng met oil industry bosses to encourage them to continue drilling in the North Sea.

In January 2022, while on a trip to Saudi Arabia, Kwarteng accepted flights and hospitality from Saudi Aramco, the majority state-owned energy firm. Kwarteng was also gifted a £300 Lenovo tablet. The BEIS department transparency data revealed that Kwarteng travelled to Saudi Arabia on a commercial flight costing the taxpayer £4,430. He also visited Aramco's Shaybah oil field with the Saudi energy minister, although this was not logged in BEIS transparency records. Opposition politicians criticised Kwarteng for accepting the Saudi state's hospitality, particularly in light of their human rights record, and raised concerns over whether he broke the ministerial code.

==== 2021 gas crisis ====
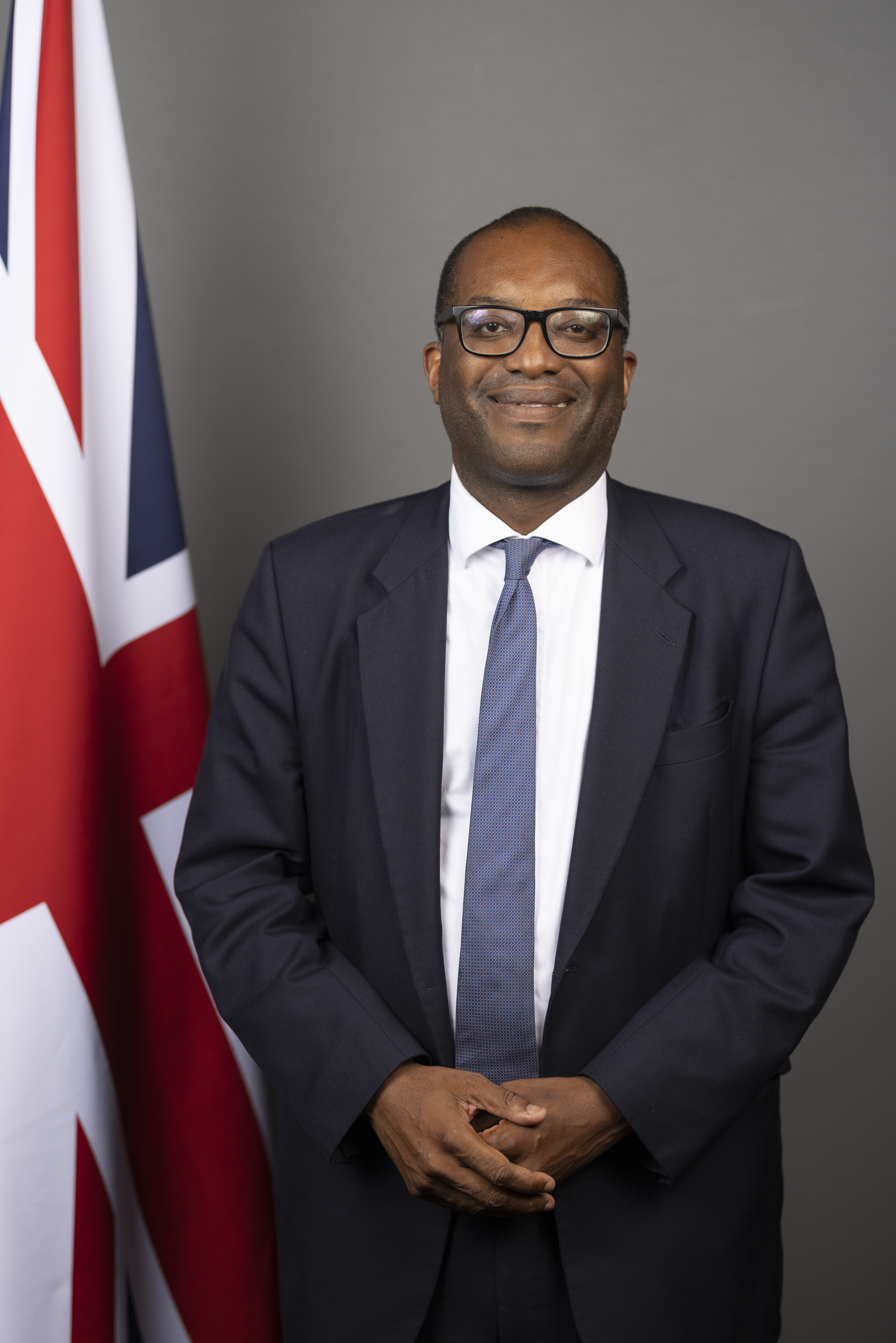
Kwarteng's official Cabinet portrait, September 2022

From August 2021, high European wholesale natural gas prices caused some smaller domestic suppliers in the United Kingdom to go out of business. In September 2021, the fuel supply crisis caused serious disruption to the supply of road fuel. Kwarteng said that "There is no question of the lights going out, of people being unable to heat their homes. There will be no three-day working week, or a throwback to the 1970s." He also said that the government would not rescue failed companies. Ed Miliband, Labour's shadow business secretary, accused Kwarteng of being complacent.

==== Role in the Owen Paterson scandal ====
Kwarteng was an outspoken supporter of Owen Paterson, who had been found by the Commons Select Committee on Standards to have committed "an egregious case of paid advocacy". In reaction to this ruling, Kwarteng called for the independent Parliamentary Commissioner for Standards, Kathryn Stone, to "consider her position". The government later withdrew its support for Paterson, who resigned as an MP. The opposition called for an investigation into Kwarteng, claiming he may have breached the ministerial code.

On 15 November 2021, Kwarteng published a letter of apology to Stone, in which he said he "did not mean to express doubt about your ability to discharge your role" and apologised for "any upset or distress my choice of words may have caused".

=== Chancellor of the Exchequer (2022) ===
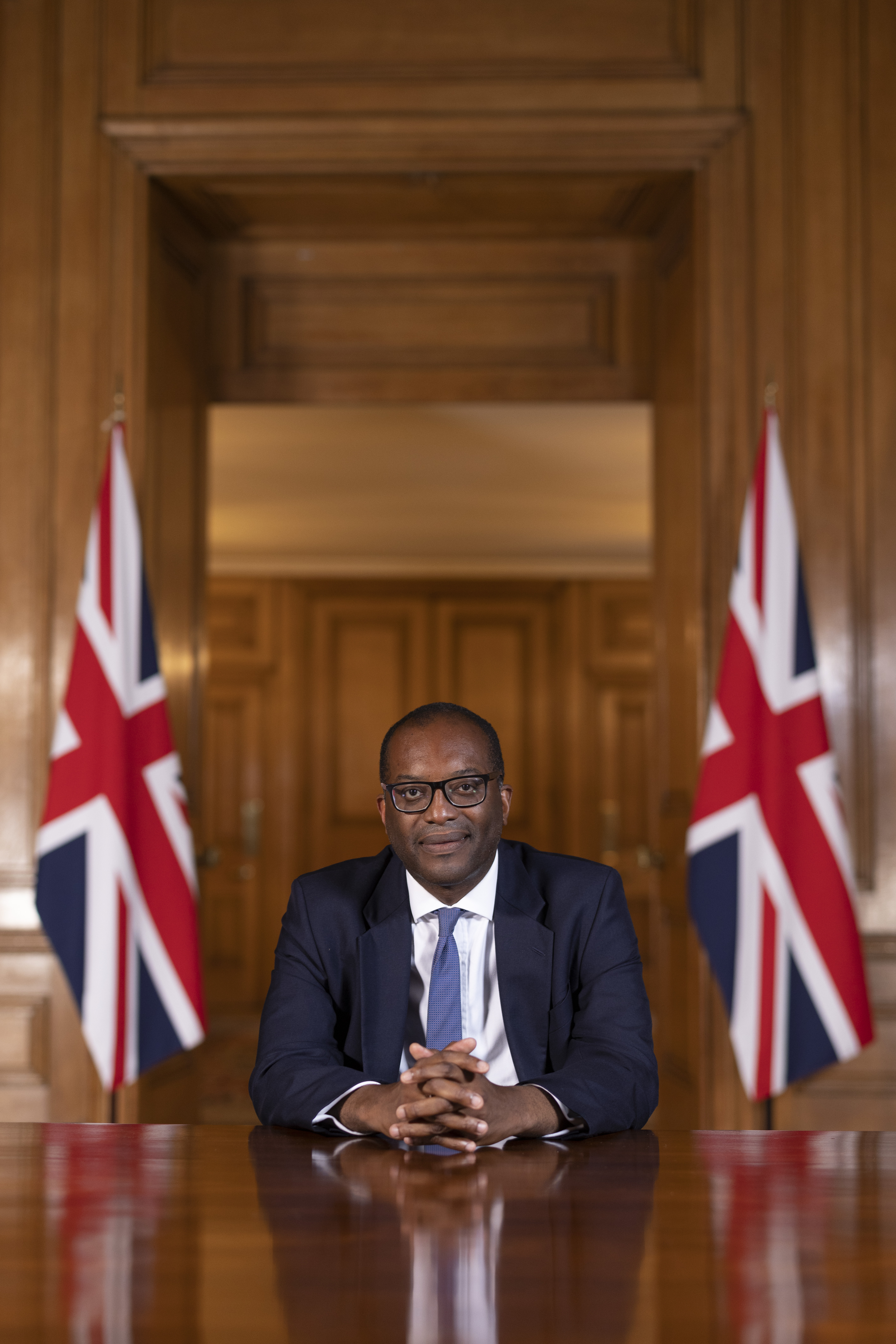
Kwarteng's official chancellorship portrait

After Johnson resigned in 2022, Kwarteng supported Liz Truss's bid to become Conservative leader. Following Truss's appointment as Prime Minister, she appointed Kwarteng as Chancellor of the Exchequer. He was the first black Chancellor. On 23 September 2022, he announced a set of economic policies named "The Growth Plan 2022" in what the Treasury described as a "fiscal event"; this was dubbed a "mini-budget" by the media. He refused to allow the Office for Budget Responsibility to assess the economic impact of the budget and provide a forecast.

Among the policies announced by Kwarteng was a cut in the basic rate of income tax from 20% to 19% to start in April 2023, the abolition of the 45% higher rate of income tax in England, Wales and Northern Ireland, the lifting of the stamp duty threshold, the freezing of energy bills, the reversal of the increase in National Insurance from April 2022, the abolition of the proposed Health and Social Care Levy, and the scrapping of the limit on bankers' bonuses.

The Institute for Fiscal Studies director Paul Johnson called the plan "the biggest package of tax cuts in 50 years" and said that it "seems to be to borrow large sums at increasingly expensive rates, put government debt on an unsustainable rising path, and hope that we get better growth". The following week, sterling fell to its lowest-ever level against the US dollar, and turmoil in government bond prices led the Bank of England to launch an emergency bond buying programme. This caused house mortgage lenders to withdraw over 40% of their products, with other products repriced upwards. The International Monetary Fund cautioned that the measures would increase inequality.

Following criticism from several Conservative MPs, including Michael Gove and Grant Shapps, Kwarteng said on 3 October 2022 that the government would not pursue the plan to abolish the 45% higher rate of income tax paid by people earning over £150,000 a year. Kwarteng said the plan had become a "distraction from our overriding mission to tackle the challenges facing the country". He acknowledged in an interview that there was "some turbulence" after his mini-budget but said it was a "very dicey situation globally", and when questioned on 13 October whether he would remain as chancellor, Kwarteng said he was "not going anywhere".

Kwarteng was sacked as Chancellor by Truss on 14 October after 38 days in post. This made him the second shortest-serving Chancellor after Iain Macleod, who died a month after taking office. Kwarteng was succeeded by Jeremy Hunt.

=== Post-dismissal as Chancellor (2022–2024) ===
Following Truss's resignation and Rishi Sunak's appointment as Prime Minister, Kwarteng said in a November 2022 interview that he warned Truss that she was "going too fast" with her ill-fated economic plans. Kwarteng stated he had urged her to "slow down" after the mini-budget. He maintained he told Truss it was "mad" to sack him, and if she did she would last just "three or four weeks [...] Little did I know it was only going to be six days." In December 2022 Kwarteng said he regretted having been "too impatient" over the mini-budget, and that there was "no tactical subtlety whatsoever. [...] People got carried away, myself included." Kwarteng maintains he and Truss were too rushed to consider economic and political results from their policies. Kwarteng maintains Truss and her team lost perspective over the budget and its political or financial results.

In February 2024, Kwarteng announced that he would not seek re-election as an MP at the 2024 general election.

== Political views ==
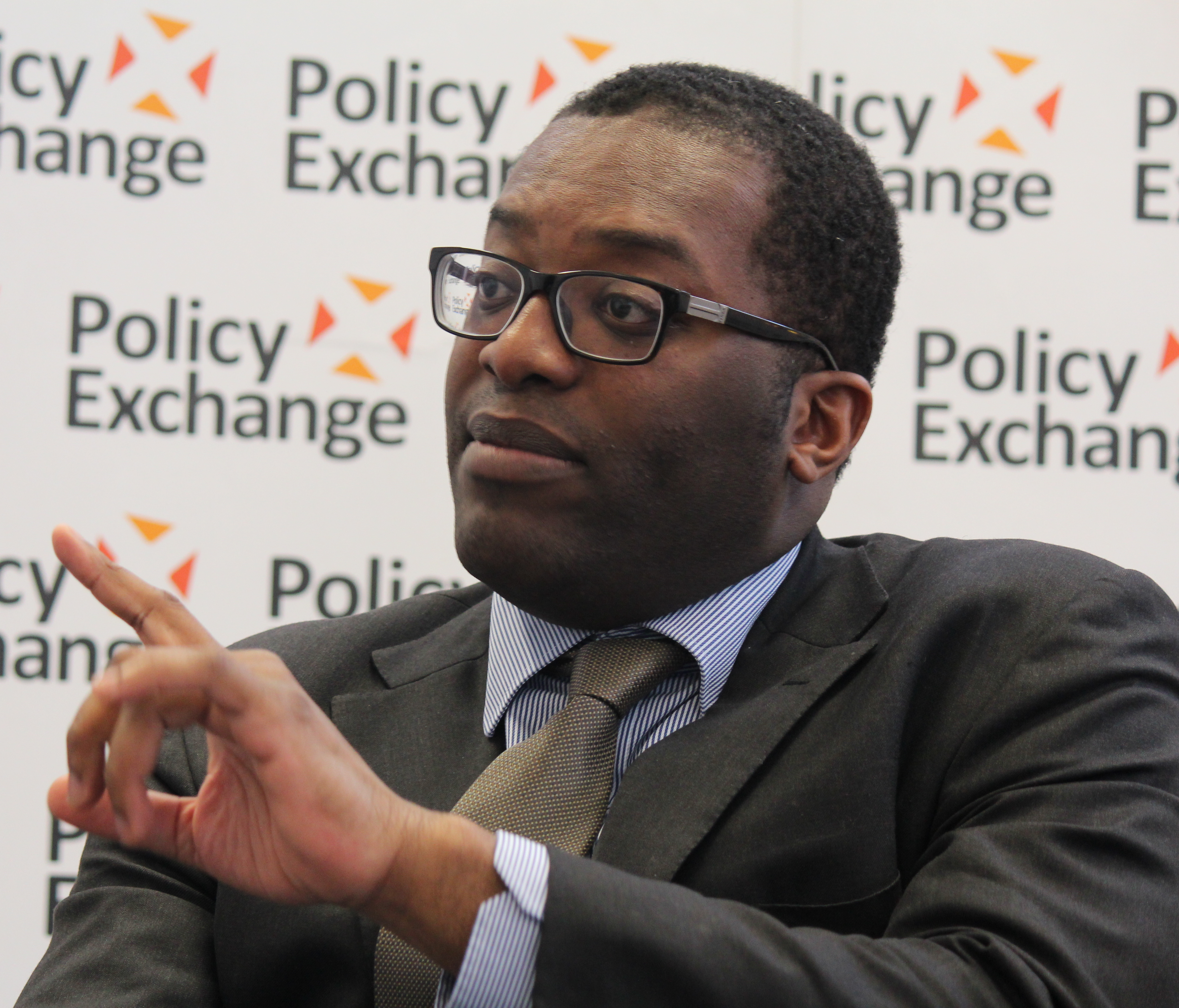
Kwarteng in 2014

Kwarteng is considered a member of the right wing of the Conservative Party, and is a member of the Free Enterprise Group.

=== Racial issues and colonialism ===
Kwarteng's views on colonialism have been described by a PoliticsHome writer as "nuanced", stating that modern representation on historical events must be taken within historical context, "I think people should look at history with a bit more humility, and a little bit more critical inquiry. It's very difficult not to have lots of preconceptions and lots of strongly held beliefs."

When asked about his thoughts on removal of British Empire-era statues and monuments, including that of slave trader Edward Colston, Kwarteng called these "acts of vandalism". In an interview, Kwarteng stated many supporters of the Black Lives Matter movement and critics of British imperialism have a "cartoon-like view" of the past, arguing for a greater understanding of the complexities of British history. Reactions to his stances on racial and colonialism issues have ranged from support to opposition. On 26 September 2022, Labour Party MP Rupa Huq was suspended after calling Kwarteng "superficially black" in response to his comments.

=== Economic issues ===
In August 2012, Kwarteng co-authored a book with four fellow Conservative MPs including Liz Truss, titled Britannia Unchained. The book argues for a radical shrinking of the welfare state in order "to return it to the contributory principle envisioned by its founder Sir William Beveridge – that you get benefits in return for contributions".

== Personal life ==
Kwarteng is described by friends as an "intensely private" person. He was previously in a relationship with former Conservative Home Secretary Amber Rudd. He married the City solicitor Harriet Edwards in December 2019. Their daughter was born in 2021. He has lived in Bayswater, and in January 2022 purchased a house in Greenwich. He is a member of the Garrick Club.

== Publications ==
- Kwarteng, Kwasi (2011). Ghosts of empire: Britain's legacies in the modern world. London: Bloomsbury. ISBN 978-1-4088-2290-6. OCLC 904756788.
- Kwarteng, Kwasi (2011). After the Coalition. Priti Patel, Dominic Raab, Chris Skidmore and Elizabeth Truss. London: Biteback. ISBN 978-1-84954-212-8. OCLC 771875676.
- Kwarteng, Kwasi (2011). Gridlock nation: why Britain's transport systems are heading towards gridlock and what we can do to stop it. Jonathan Dupont. London: Biteback. ISBN 978-1-84954-112-1. OCLC 751663991.
- Kwasi Kwarteng; Priti Patel; Dominic Raab; Chris Skidmore; Liz Truss (2012). Britannia Unchained: Global Lessons for Growth and Prosperity. Houndmills, Basingstoke, Hampshire: Palgrave Macmillan. ISBN 978-1-137-03223-2. OCLC 809314985.
- Kwarteng, Kwasi (2014). War and gold: a five-hundred-year history of empires, adventures and debt. London: Bloomsbury. ISBN 978-1-4088-4815-9. OCLC 872709558.
- Kwarteng, Kwasi (2015). Thatcher's trial: six months that defined a leader. London: Bloomsbury. ISBN 978-1-4088-5917-9. OCLC 919896895.

== Notes ==
Parliament of the United Kingdom
Preceded by David Wilshire	Member of Parliament for Spelthorne; 2010–2024	Succeeded by Lincoln Jopp
Political offices
Preceded by Suella Braverman	Parliamentary Under-Secretary of State for Exiting the European Union; 2018–2019	Position abolished
Preceded by Claire Perry O'Neill	Minister of State for Business, Energy and Clean Growth; 2019–2021	Succeeded by Anne-Marie Trevelyan
Preceded by Alok Sharma	Secretary of State for Business, Energy and Industrial Strategy; 2021–2022	Succeeded by Jacob Rees-Mogg
Preceded by Nadhim Zahawi	Chancellor of the Exchequer; 2022	Succeeded by Jeremy Hunt
