= Pilditch baronets =

Baronetcy in the Baronetage of the United Kingdom

The Pilditch Baronetcy, of Bartropps in the County of Surrey, is a title in the Baronetage of the United Kingdom. It was created on 28 June 1929 for Philip Pilditch. He represented Spelthorne in the House of Commons as a Unionist. As of 2014 the title is held by his great-grandson, the fifth Baronet, who succeeded his father in 2012.

== Pilditch baronets, of Bartropps (1929) ==
- Sir Philip Edward Pilditch, 1st Baronet (1861–1948)
- Sir Philip Harold Pilditch, 2nd Baronet (1890–1949)
- Sir Philip John Frederick Pilditch, 3rd Baronet (1919–1954)
- Sir Richard Edward Pilditch, 4th Baronet (1926–2012)
- Sir John Richard Pilditch, 5th Baronet (born 1955).
