= Beresford Craddock =

British politician (1898–1976)

Sir George Beresford Craddock
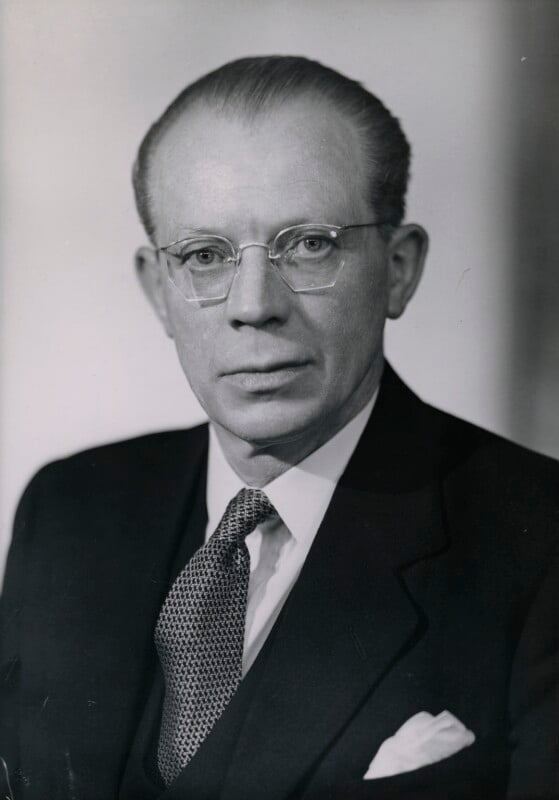
- Craddock in 1950

Member of Parliament (MP) for Spelthorne
- In office 1950–1970
- Preceded by: George Pargiter
- Succeeded by: Humphrey Atkins

Personal details
- Born: 7 October 1898 Dundee, Scotland
- Died: 22 September 1976 (aged 77)
- Party: National Labour; Conservative (after 1945)
- Spouse: Ethel Martin Bradford (m. 1936)
- Education: Harris Academy, Dundee; St Andrews University
- Military career
- Allegiance: United Kingdom
- Branch: British Army
- Service years: 1914-1918
- Units: Royal Garrison Artillery; Royal Engineers Chemical Warfare
- Conflicts: World War I

Sir George Beresford Craddock (7 October 1898 – 22 September 1976) was a British Conservative politician. He was elected as Member of Parliament (MP) for Spelthorne at the 1950 general election, and held the seat until his retirement at the 1970 general election.

== Early life and career ==
Craddock was educated at Harris Academy, Dundee and St Andrews University, where he gained a First in Physics and Chemistry (BSc), with special distinction in Chemistry, and an MA in Economics and Philosophy. In the First World War he first served in the Royal Garrison Artillery, then as a Staff Lieutenant, Royal Engineers Chemical Warfare Staff. He held major business executive posts in India and Africa, 1921–39. During the Second World War he was Assistant Director at the Ministry of Supply.

He became Barrister at Law, Gray's Inn, from 1947 with chambers in the Middle Temple.

== Political career ==
His political ambitions had surfaced in the 1930s when he contested Lichfield, Staffordshire, for the National Government in a by-election (as National Labour) in 1938 and contested the same seat in 1945 as a National candidate. He was elected to Parliament as Conservative member for the Spelthorne Division of Middlesex in 1950 and held the seat until his retirement in 1970. He was Parliamentary Private Secretary to Harold Watkinson, Minister of Transport and Civil Aviation, 1956–9, and to Watkinson as Minister of Defence, 1959–62. He was a member of the Speaker's Panel of Chairmen, 1966–70.

He is often remembered for his controversial speech: “Let us remember that 95% of them are primitive people. One of the reasons why they are not generally accepted into hotels is because their sanitary habits are not all that could be desired… It is well known that a large number of Africans in East and Central Africa are riddled with a disease of a very unfortunate kind… I will not dwell on that very delicate subject but I think that Honorable Members who have experience will agree that the attitude of the African towards women and sexual matters is entirely different from the attitude of the general run of Europeans… it is a common practice among Africans to put children to sleep by excitation of their urogenital organs… The effect of alcohol upon an African is remarkable. I admit that sometimes alcohol has a remarkable effect on Europeans. But speaking generally, alcohol seems to bring out all the evil instincts in the African in the most astonishing way… these views and practices are due to the psychological makeup of those primitive people from time immemorial.” B. Craddock, House of Commons, May 1953.

== Personal life ==
Craddock married Ethel Martin Bradford in 1936.

He was knighted on 8 July 1960.

In the 1960's he lived in The Grove, Highgate before moving towards the end of his life to Henley Down House, Battle, Sussex. Like many Conservative MPs he was a member of the Carlton Club.

Parliament of the United Kingdom
| Preceded by George Pargiter | Member of Parliament for Spelthorne; 1950–1970 | Succeeded by Humphrey Atkins |
