= David Wilshire =

British politician (1943–2023)

- Wilshire as an MP

Member of Parliament for Spelthorne
- In office 11 June 1987 – 12 April 2010
- Preceded by: Humphrey Atkins
- Succeeded by: Kwasi Kwarteng

Personal details
- Born: 16 September 1943 Bristol, England
- Died: 31 October 2023 (aged 80) Somerset, England
- Party: Conservative
- Children: 2
- Education: Fitzwilliam College, Cambridge

David Wilshire (16 September 1943 – 31 October 2023) was a British politician. A member of the Conservative Party, he served as Member of Parliament (MP) for Spelthorne in Surrey from 1987 to 2010. Wilshire was considered to be to the right of the party's mainstream.

Wilshire introduced Section 28 legislation in 1988. In 2009 he was implicated in the parliamentary expenses scandal.

== Outside Parliament ==
Wilshire was educated at Kingswood School, Bath, and Fitzwilliam College, Cambridge, where he received an MA in Geography in 1965. He was a councillor on Wansdyke District Council from 1976 to 1987 and served as leader from 1981 to 1987. He was elected as councillor on Avon County Council from 1977 to 1981. He also worked for Conservative MEPs from 1979 to 1985.

As well as building up his own group of small businesses and working as a personnel officer and a schoolteacher, he was a partner with Western Political Research Services (1979–2000), the co-director of Political Management Programme, Brunel University (1985–1990), and became a partner of Moorlands Research Service in 2000.

Wilshire was separated with one son. In 1982 his daughter died, aged 12, after choking at school. His main home was in Somerset, where he lived with his partner Ann Palmer.

== Parliamentary career ==
=== Section 28 and sexual orientation issues ===
Shortly after being elected as an MP in 1987, Wilshire saw a copy of the book Jenny Lives with Eric and Martin, about two gay men and their daughter, a copy of which was stocked in an Inner London Education Authority (ILEA) teachers' resource centre. Wilshire said of it: "[The book] portrays a child living with two men ... [and] clearly shows that as an acceptable family relationship." As a result, with the support of Jill Knight, Wilshire introduced Section 28 as an amendment to the Local Government Bill at the committee stage. The amendment made it illegal for local authorities to "promote homosexuality or ... promote the teaching in any maintained school of the acceptability of homosexuality".

Section 28 became a major political issue. In April 1988, a national demonstration of more than 30,000 was held in London. "Stop the Clause" groups sprang up in most cities, which organised local protests to complement national action. One evening, the BBC's Six O'Clock News headlines were disrupted by shouts of "Stop Clause 28!" and when the clause was debated in the Lords, protesting lesbians abseiled from the public gallery down to the floor of the House. The actor Ian McKellen described Wilshire and Knight as the "ugly sisters" of a political pantomime. In 2003, in a rare public speech about his role in Section 28, Wilshire stated: "Little did I realise what I was unleashing ... I got a fair amount of hate mail and a fair amount of publicity, most of it unflattering." He claimed that the bill had always been about misuse of taxpayers' money, and not bigotry.

The ban was eventually reversed by Parliament in 2003. Wilshire was one of 76 MPs to vote against the repeal.

In 2000 Wilshire voted to prohibit teachers from introducing steps to prevent bullying on the grounds of homosexuality in a later Local Government Bill. Wilshire voted against homosexual couples being allowed to adopt children in 2002, against the Civil Partnership Bill of 2004, which granted a legal relationship for same-sex couples, and against Equality Act (Sexual Orientation) in 2007, which outlawed discrimination in the provision of goods, facilities, services, education and public functions on the grounds of sexual orientation. In each case Wilshire's vote was in the minority.

=== Political views ===
Wilshire voted against bans on hunting and smoking, and voted both for and against the Iraq War.

Wilshire opposed the Good Friday Agreement in Northern Ireland and was one of the first Conservative MPs to declare that he would never support UK entry into a single European currency.

In 1995 Wilshire protested to the then prime minister, John Major, about the government's proposals to allow people from Hong Kong to live in the UK. He received criticism for stating: "It's not acceptable to the British people to let in one more ... this country is full up."

Wilshire voted against the introduction of the National Minimum Wage in 1999 by opposing the National Minimum Wage Act 1998. In 2009 he became one of 11 MPs to back the Employment Opportunities Bill, which aimed to abolish the minimum wage, but was defeated in Parliament.

Wilshire opposed the idea that MPs should not have second jobs and stated that "state employed parliamentarians" would be something that "Stalin would applaud". He combined being an MP with being the partner of Moorlands Research Service for eight years and from 1987 to 1990 combined being an MP with two other jobs. He was one of 21 Conservative MPs to vote in favour of keeping the additional costs allowance for MPs' second homes, despite the Conservative Party leader David Cameron's calls for it to be reformed.

Wilshire went against the official Conservative Party line and supported the construction of a third runway at Heathrow Airport, which, although it lies just outside the Spelthorne constituency, nevertheless provides employment for a considerable number of people locally. Wilshire described those that opposed the expansion as the "anti-brigade", which included David Cameron, whom he accused of peddling a "lie" that transit passengers at Heathrow spent almost nothing.

=== Expenses scandal ===
In 2009, Wilshire was among a number of MPs exposed in the expenses scandal, and faced considerable hostility from his constituents.

Wilshire was originally questioned by his local newspaper, the Staines Informer, about why he had claimed the maximum allowance for a second home in London when his constituency home was in a commuter belt. During the interview he stated: "In 22 years of living in London, I have always furnished the flat out of my own pocket." However, four days later The Daily Telegraph revealed that Wilshire had an unusual arrangement whereby he claimed thousands of pounds of taxpayers' money for monthly payments towards the cost of interior decoration for his London flat, even though he did not have to provide any receipts for the work. Wilshire was questioned about this by his local newspaper again, in which he said he was "embarrassed, sad and sorry", but he revealed that he had not spent the money allocated to him for decoration on this yet, but would do in the future, and therefore he refused to pay the money back or resign.

It later emerged that Wilshire had spent over £1,000 of taxpayers' money on furniture in 2004, which contradicted his previous claims. When challenged on this, he refused to give an interview but sent an email to the local press in which he stated that: "I obtained the cheapest self-assembly replacement available from MFI." However, even this email caused him more problems, as in it he stated that he had bought the flat in 1983 – four years before he had become an MP and four years before when he previously revealed he had bought it. He later wrote a letter to the paper stating that he did buy the flat in 1987 and that the paper's journalists had been forgetful about facts he had told them, and had confused "furnishing a property with repairing it". The newspaper replied that it stood by what it had reported. When local demands grew for Wilshire to meet his constituents over the claims, Wilshire expressed that he would only meet them one-to-one, and would not hold a public meeting.

As a result, the Conservative Anti-Corruption Group was formed, which aimed to oust Wilshire at the 2010 general election. One of its members included a former Conservative councillor and canvassing partner of Wilshire. Shortly afterwards, at a Spelthorne Conservative Association meeting, six members of the Conservative Party announced they were prepared to stand against him at the 2010 general election.

Following further investigation by The Daily Telegraph, on 14 October 2009, Wilshire asked the Parliamentary Standards Commissioner to investigate his office expenses. Wilshire admitted using parliamentary expenses to pay £105,000 over three years to Moorlands Research Services, a company he set up and owned with his partner Ann Palmer to run his office, but insisted it was approved by the authorities. Parliamentary expenses rules forbid MPs from entering into arrangements which "may give rise to an accusation" of profiting from public funds. Wilshire told the BBC that he had referred himself to the Parliamentary Standards Commissioner as the only way to answer the questions about his expenses, and that the company had never made a profit and had been wound up. Moorlands Research Services was never registered with Companies House, and never filed public accounts. The following day, Wilshire announced that he would stand down as an MP, saying that he was reluctant to do this, but accepted it was the "sensible" thing to do. On 2 November 2009, when the Parliamentary Standards Commission ended its probe into him without producing any results, Wilshire apologised for equating his treatment over expenses to the Holocaust.

=== 2010 visit to Georgian separatist outpost ===
On 20 April 2010, as Co-rapporteur of the Monitoring Committee of the Parliamentary Assembly of the Council of Europe (PACE) he held a meeting with a member of the Georgian separatist government of South Ossetia in the self-proclaimed Embassy of the Republic of South Ossetia in Moscow. The Georgian Ministry of Foreign Affairs said that:

... Georgia expresses its strong protest over this deplorable fact. Georgia fully respects the liberty of a parliamentarian, however Mr. Wilshire, the member of the Parliamentary Assembly of the Council of Europe was acting in his capacity of the Assembly's Co-rapporteur, hence representing the whole organisation. This is the first instance when an official representative of the international organisation holds the [sic] meeting in the premises of the "Embassy" of the proxy regimes [sic?].

=== Other activities ===
In 2000 Wilshire threatened to sue a Labour Party member for defamation who had written in the Heathrow Villager that Wilshire was scaremongering and misleading the public about the only hospital remaining in his seat. Wilshire received criticism as the author of the piece was a cancer-suffering pensioner who was being treated at the hospital. The Guardian, which had previously been compared to the Third Reich by Wilshire, described him as "Britain's stupidest MP" as a result.

Wilshire was among opponents to the proposal that Princess Diana speak to MPs about outlawing landmines in 1997, following an invitation from the newly elected Labour government. She ultimately decided not to speak, following the opposition.

In 2008 he was the subject of a parliamentary enquiry after it was claimed that he raised thousands of pounds for his local party by hosting constituents on visits to the House of Commons. The enquiry cleared him of any wrongdoing.

Wilshire joined Margaret Thatcher in calling for the former Chilean dictator Augusto Pinochet to be released, when he was under house arrest in London in 1998.

In 2003 he pushed successfully to have Council of Europe officials look into the UK to assess whether it is necessary to officially monitor the UK's voting procedures. He said the then government had failed to put its "house in order" to prevent fraudulent voting and accused the government of "systematically ignoring" pleas from the Electoral Commission. "If the British government won't put its own house in order, you mustn't be surprised if there are some of us who will try to find someone else who will make them put their house in order," he told BBC Radio 4's World at One programme. He also opposed the introduction of identity cards and called for the "removal of innocent children" from the United Kingdom National DNA Database.

Wilshire was parliamentary private secretary to Alan Clark in 1991, the PPS to Peter Lloyd from 1992 to 1994, and was a Conservative whip in the House of Commons from 2001 to 2005. He was a member of the Northern Ireland Select Committee (1994–1997), a member of the Foreign Affairs Select Committee (1997–2000) and became a member of the Transport Select Committee and of the Chairman's Panel in 2005. He was also elected on to the executive of the Conservatives' 1922 Committee in 2005.

== Death ==
Wilshire died in Somerset, on 31 October 2023, aged 80.

Parliament of the United Kingdom
Preceded by Humphrey Atkins	Member of Parliament for Spelthorne; 1987–2010	Succeeded by Kwasi Kwarteng
