= George Pargiter, Baron Pargiter =

George Albert Pargiter, Baron Pargiter, CBE (16 March 1897 – 16 January 1982) was a British Labour Party Member of Parliament (MP).

He was elected as MP for Spelthorne at the 1945 general election. After boundary changes made that seat marginal, he changed constituency to win the Southall seat at the 1950 general election. He held that constituency until his retirement at the 1966 general election.

Having been appointed a Commander of the Order of the British Empire (CBE) in the 1961 New Year Honours, he was created a life peer on 9 June 1966 taking the title Baron Pargiter, of Southall in the London Borough of Ealing.

Parliament of the United Kingdom
Preceded by Reginald Blaker	Member of Parliament for Spelthorne; 1945–1950	Succeeded by Beresford Craddock
Preceded by Walter Ayles	Member of Parliament for Southall; 1950–1966	Succeeded by Syd Bidwell
