= Lincoln Jopp =

British politician (born 1968)

Colonel Lincoln Jopp MC MP
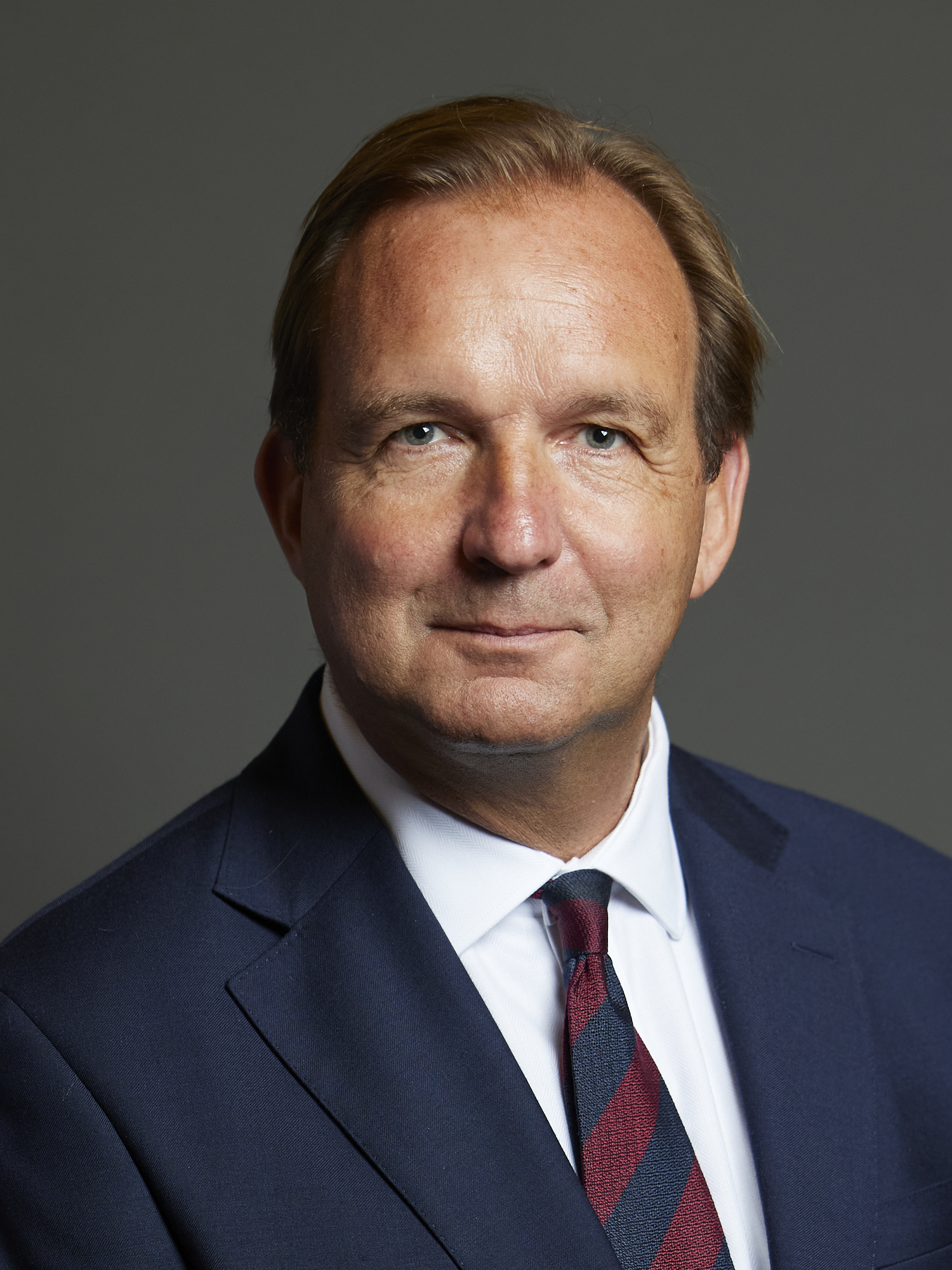
- Official portrait, 2024

Member of Parliament for Spelthorne
- Incumbent
- Assumed office 4 July 2024
- Preceded by: Kwasi Kwarteng
- Majority: 1,590 (3.4%)

Personal details
- Born: Lincoln Peter Munro Jopp; 2 February 1968 (age 58) Barnes, London, England
- Party: Conservative
- Spouse: Caroline Jopp
- Children: 3
- Relatives: John Horam (stepfather)
- Education: St Paul's School; University of Stirling (BA); Royal Military Academy Sandhurst
- Awards: Military Cross

Military service
- Allegiance: United Kingdom
- Branch/service: British Army
- Years of service: 1990–2011
- Rank: Colonel
- Unit: Scots Guards

Lincoln Peter Munro Jopp MC (born 2 February 1968) is a British Conservative Party politician who has been the Member of Parliament for Spelthorne since 2024.

Before entering the Commons, Jopp was a company and charity director and former colonel in the British Army. He is a veteran of the Sierra Leone Civil War. In December 1999, he was presented the Military Cross by the Queen at a ceremony in Buckingham Palace.

== Early life and education ==
Lincoln Jopp was born in February 1968 in Barnes, London. He attended St Paul's School, and went on to study theology and philosophy at the University of Stirling.

His stepfather was Lord Horam, the Conservative peer and former Labour, SDP and Conservative MP.

== Early career ==
Having been awarded a university cadetship, Jopp was commissioned as a second lieutenant (on probation) on 7 September 1986. He attended the Royal Military Academy Sandhurst where he was awarded the Sword of Honour. Upon commissioning, he joined the 1st Battalion Scots Guards.

During his service, Jopp was deployed to various conflict zones, including Northern Ireland, Iraq and Afghanistan. On 5 December 1997, he was awarded the Military Cross (MC) "in recognition of gallant and distinguished services in Sierra Leone in May–June 1997". He commanded the Scots Guards in Afghanistan in the summer of 2010, and was awarded the Queen's Commendation for Valuable Service "in recognition of gallant services in Afghanistan during the period 1st April 2010 to 30th September 2010". He commanded his regiment on The Queen's Birthday Parade ("Trooping the Colour") in 2011.

Jopp was a director of The Pension SuperFund from April 2017 to March 2018. The company was dissolved in 2022.

== Political career ==
Jopp stood for selection in Weald of Kent for the Conservatives in August 2023, finishing last. In March 2024 Jopp applied to be the Conservative candidate for Henley and Thame again unsuccessfully. In June 2024 Jopp was selected to be the Conservative candidate for the constituency of Spelthorne in Surrey where he went on to win the seat at the subsequent general election that year.

In the August 2026 Shadow Cabinet Reshuffle, he was appointed Shadow Parliamentary under Secretary of State in the Shadow Foreign, Commonwealth and Development Affairs Team.

== Personal life ==
Lincoln Jopp is married to Caroline Jopp; they have three children.

Nicky Clarke and Caroline Jopp co-founded the Military Wives Choirs organisation.

Parliament of the United Kingdom
Preceded by Kwasi Kwarteng	Member of Parliament for Spelthorne; 2024–present	Incumbent
