= Blaker baronets =

Baronetcy in the Baronetage of the United Kingdom

- Escutcheon of the Blaker baronets
- Creation date: 1919
- Status: extant

The Blaker Baronetcy, of Brighton in the County of Sussex, is a title in the Baronetage of the United Kingdom. It was created on 5 September 1919 for Sir John Blaker. He was Mayor of Brighton from 1895 to 1898. He was succeeded by his son, the second Baronet. He sat as Conservative Member of Parliament for Spelthorne from 1931 to 1945. As of 2007 the title is held by his son, the third Baronet, who succeeded in 1975.

== Blaker baronets, of Brighton (1919) ==
- Sir John George Blaker, Kt., OBE, 1st Baronet (1854–1926)
- Sir Reginald Blaker, 2nd Baronet (1900–1975)
- Sir John Blaker, 3rd Baronet (born 1935)

There is no heir to the baronetcy.
