= Blaker (disambiguation) =

Blaker is a village in Sweden.

Blaker may also refer to:

People

- Blaker (surname)

Places

- Blaker Station
- Blaker (Netherlands)
