= Humphrey Atkins =

British politician (1922-1996)

The Right Honourable The Lord Colnbrook KCMG PC
- Atkins in 1963

Lord Keeper of the Privy Seal (Government spokesperson for Foreign and Commonwealth Affairs)
- In office 11 September 1981 – 7 April 1982
- Prime Minister: Margaret Thatcher
- Preceded by: Ian Gilmour
- Succeeded by: Baroness Young

Secretary of State for Northern Ireland
- In office 4 May 1979 – 11 September 1981
- Prime Minister: Margaret Thatcher
- Preceded by: Roy Mason
- Succeeded by: Jim Prior

Opposition Chief Whip of the House of Commons
- In office 4 March 1974 – 4 May 1979
- Leader: Edward Heath; Margaret Thatcher
- Preceded by: Bob Mellish
- Succeeded by: Michael Cocks

Government Chief Whip of the House of Commons Parliamentary Secretary to the Treasury
- In office 2 December 1973 – 4 March 1974
- Prime Minister: Edward Heath
- Preceded by: Francis Pym
- Succeeded by: Bob Mellish

Government Deputy Chief Whip Treasurer of the Household
- In office 18 June 1970 – 2 December 1973
- Prime Minister: Edward Heath
- Preceded by: Charles Morris
- Succeeded by: Bernard Weatherill

Member of Parliament for Spelthorne
- In office 18 June 1970 – 18 May 1987
- Preceded by: Beresford Craddock
- Succeeded by: David Wilshire

Member of Parliament for Merton and Morden
- In office 26 May 1955 – 29 May 1970
- Preceded by: Robert Ryder
- Succeeded by: Janet Fookes

Personal details
- Born: 12 August 1922 Chalfont St Peter, Buckinghamshire, England
- Died: 4 October 1996 (aged 74) Waltham St Lawrence, Berkshire, England
- Party: Conservative
- Spouse: Margaret Spencer-Nairn
- Children: 4, including Julia Keay
- Relatives: Anna Keay (granddaughter) John Keay (son-in-law)

Humphrey Edward Gregory Atkins, Baron Colnbrook, KCMG, PC (12 August 1922 – 4 October 1996) was a British politician and a member of the Conservative Party. He served for 32 years as a Member of Parliament (MP), and served in the Cabinet of Prime Minister Margaret Thatcher from 1979 to 1982.

== Early life ==
Atkins was born on 12 August 1922, in Chalfont St Peter, Buckinghamshire, son of Captain Edward Davis Atkins and Violet Mary (née Preston). His family spent his first few years in Kenya, returning to England after his father died from being attacked by a rhinoceros. Atkins was educated at Wellington College, Berkshire, and served in the Royal Navy from 1940 to 1948.

In 1944, Atkins married Margaret Spencer-Nairn. They had four children, three daughters – including the historian and biographer Julia Keay – and one son. He worked for Nairn's, his wife's family's linoleum business in Kirkcaldy, Scotland, then became a director of a financial advertising agency.

== Political career ==
Atkins contested the constituency of West Lothian in 1951, and was elected as a Member of Parliament (MP) for Merton and Morden in 1955. He became MP for Spelthorne in 1970.

Atkins was the Conservative Chief Whip from 1973 to 1979, and served as a Secretary of State for Northern Ireland from 1979 to 1981. In September 1981, he was appointed as Lord Privy Seal, which was a role as the chief government spokesman in the House of Commons for Foreign and Commonwealth Affairs. This role was necessary because the Foreign Secretary, Lord Carrington, sat in the House of Lords. He resigned in April 1982, along with Lord Carrington, over the Falklands invasion.

Atkins was appointed as a Knight Commander of the Order of St Michael and St George (KCMG) in the 1983 Dissolution Honours. He left the House of Commons in 1987 and was created a life peer on 16 October as Baron Colnbrook, of Waltham St Lawrence in the Royal County of Berkshire in the 1987 Dissolution Honours.

== Death ==
Atkins died from cancer on 4 October 1996, aged 74, at home in Waltham St Lawrence, Berkshire.

Parliament of the United Kingdom
Preceded by Robert Ryder	Member of Parliament for Merton and Morden; 1955–1970	Succeeded by Janet Fookes
Preceded by Beresford Craddock	Member of Parliament for Spelthorne; 1970–1987	Succeeded by David Wilshire
Political offices
Preceded by Charles Morris	Deputy Chief Whip of the House of Commons; Treasurer of the Household; 1970–1973	Succeeded by Bernard Weatherill
Preceded by Francis Pym	Chief Whip of the Conservative Party; 1973–1979	Succeeded by Michael Jopling
Preceded by Francis Pym	Parliamentary Secretary to the Treasury; 1973–1974	Succeeded by Bob Mellish
Preceded by Roy Mason	Secretary of State for Northern Ireland; 1979–1981	Succeeded by Jim Prior
Preceded by Ian Gilmour	Lord Privy Seal; 1981–1982	Succeeded by Baroness Young
Party political offices
Preceded by Francis Pym	Conservative Deputy Chief Whip in the House of Commons; 1970–1973	Succeeded by Bernard Weatherill
