= Philip Pilditch =

British architect and Unionist politician

Sir Philip Pilditch
- Born: Philip Edward Pilditch; 12 August 1861; Compton, Plymouth, Devon, England
- Died: 17 December 1948 (aged 87)
- Education: Cheveley Hall, Mannamead
- Alma mater: King's College London
- Occupations: architect and politician
- Spouse: Emily Mary Lewis
- Children: 2 sons
- Parent(s): Philip John Pilditch; Emma Rosa Pilditch (née Willmott)

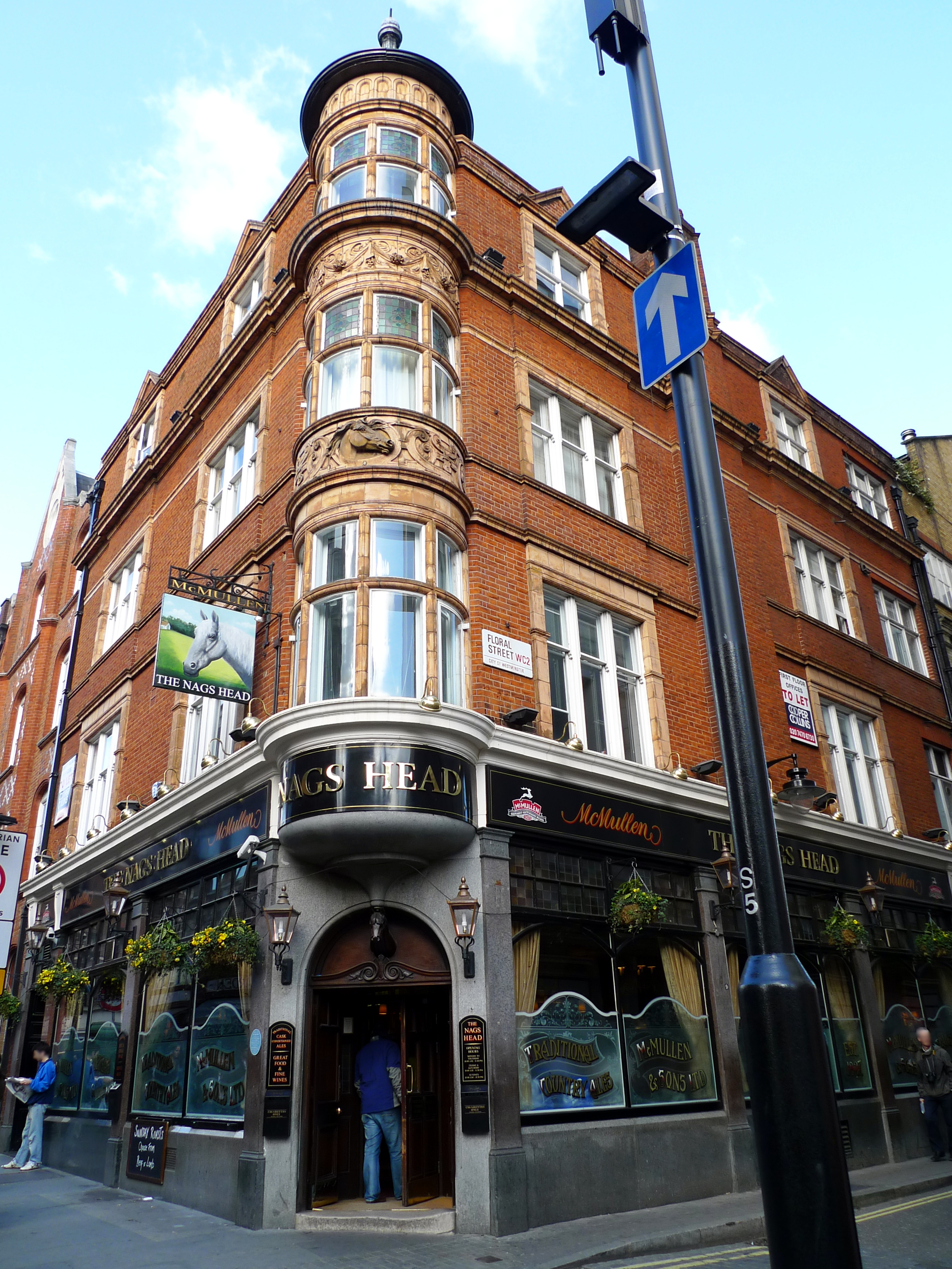
The Nag's Head, Covent Garden, a pub he designed.

Sir Philip Edward Pilditch, 1st Baronet, JP (12 August 1861 – 17 December 1948) was a British architect and Unionist politician.

== Early life ==
Born in Compton, Plymouth, he was the eldest son of Philip John Pilditch and Emma Rosa Pilditch (née Willmott).

He was educated at Cheveley Hall, Mannamead and at King's College London.

== Career ==
Pilditch was active in the Conservative Party, and stood unsuccessfully at St Ives at the 1906 general election and at Islington East in December 1910.

In 1907 Pilditch was elected to the London County Council, representing Islington East. He was a member of the Conservative-backed Municipal Reform Party which took control of the council from the Progressive Party which was allied to the Liberal Party. The Islington seat was marginal, and at the next council elections in 1910 he was returned for the safer electoral division of Strand. He held the seat in 1913 and remained on the council until 1919. He was a prominent member of the council, and served as vice-chairman in 1913–1914.

Pilditch held a commission in the 1st Sussex Volunteer Artillery, retiring with the rank of captain. During the First World War he was active in the raising of fifty battalions for the New Army in Surrey, Middlesex and London, and acted as honorary treasurer for the battalion funds.

Pilditch was elected to the House of Commons at the 1918 general election becoming the first Member of Parliament for the new constituency of Spelthorne in Middlesex. He held the seat at successive elections until he stood down in 1931. He had a great interest in the preservation of ancient monuments, helping to pilot the Ancient Monuments Act 1931 through parliament. He was also involved in the preservation of the Elizabethan architecture of his home town and served as the president of the Old Plymouth Society.

He was knighted in 1918 and created a baronet, "of Bartropps in the parish of Weybridge in the County of Surrey" in 1929.

== Death ==
He died at his home near Weybridge, Surrey in December 1948, aged 87. He was succeeded in the baronetage by his son, Philip Harold.

== Personal life ==
In 1888 he married Emily Mary Lewis, the daughter of a director of the National Provincial Bank. The couple had two sons and a daughter, Mabel Emily who married Major Henry Hammick. He established the business of Pilditch and Chadwick, surveyors and architects, of which he was head.

== References and sources ==
Sources

- Kidd, Charles, Williamson, David (editors). Debrett's Peerage and Baronetage (1990 edition). New York: St Martin's Press, 1990.
- Leigh Rayment's list of baronets

Parliament of the United Kingdom
New constituency	Member of Parliament for Spelthorne; 1918–1931	Succeeded by Sir Reginald Blaker
Baronetage of the United Kingdom
New creation	Baronet (of Bartropps); 1929–1948	Succeeded by Philip Harold Pilditch
