= Reginald Blaker =

British politician

Sir Reginald Blaker, 2nd Baronet TD (27 April 1900 – 3 January 1975) was a British Conservative politician.

== Biography ==
Blaker was the son of Sir John Blaker, 1st Baronet, Mayor of Brighton, and his wife Eliza (née Cowell). He was educated at Charterhouse and was later called to the Bar, Inner Temple. He succeeded his father in 1926, becoming the 2nd Baronet. In 1931, he was elected to the House of Commons as member of parliament (MP) for Spelthorne, a seat he retained until 1945.

He served in the Special Reserve with the Coldstream Guards and was commissioned into the 57th (Home Counties) Field Brigade, Royal Artillery (TA) in 1923. He fought in the Second World War as a Major in the Royal Artillery and was awarded the Territorial Decoration in 1942.

In 1930, Blaker married Sheila Kellas Cran, daughter of Dr. Alexander Cran. They had a daughter, Anne (b. 29 February 1932), and a son, John (b. 22 March 1935). Blaker died in January 1975, aged 74, and was succeeded in the baronetcy by his son John.

== Notes ==
Parliament of the United Kingdom
Preceded by Sir Philip Pilditch	Member of Parliament for Spelthorne; 1931 – 1945	Succeeded by George Pargiter
Baronetage of the United Kingdom
Preceded by John George Blaker	Baronet (of Brighton); 1926–1975	Succeeded by John Blaker
