= Municipal Borough of Southall =

Former local government area in the UK

Coordinates: 51.5113°N 0.3753°W

Southall
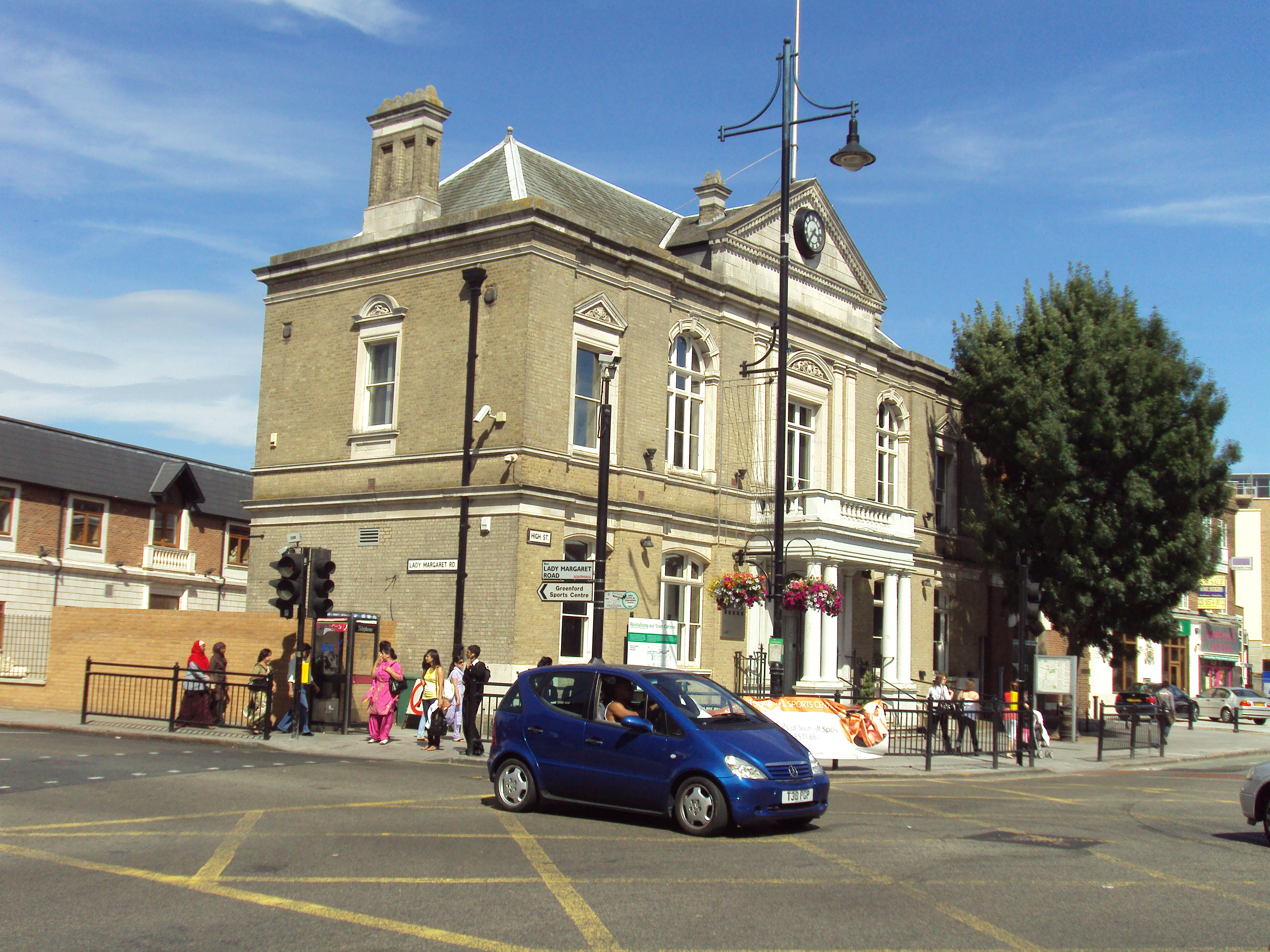
- Southall Town Hall

- Southall within Middlesex in 1961
- History
  - Created: 1891
  - Abolished: 1965
  - Succeeded by: London Borough of Ealing
- Status: Local board (1891 - 1894); Urban district (1894 - 1936); Municipal borough (after 1936)
- Government
  - Motto: For All
- Coat of arms of the borough council

Southall (until 1936 Southall Norwood) was a local government district in the county of Middlesex, United Kingdom from 1891 to 1965. It consisted of the civil parish of Norwood.

== History ==
Southall Norwood Local Government District was created on 16 January 1891, with a local board of health, when the parish of Norwood adopted the Local Government Act 1858.

The Local Government Act 1894 reconstituted the local board's area as an urban district. Southall-Norwood Urban District Council, consisting of 14 elected councillors, replaced the local board. In 1936 the urban district was granted a charter of incorporation and became a municipal borough at the same time renamed Southall. Southall Borough Council consisted of a mayor, 6 aldermen and 18 councillors. The old district name survives in the names of institutions such as the Southall Norwood Hospital.

The borough was abolished in 1965 by the London Government Act 1963 and its area now forms part of the present-day London Borough of Ealing.

Southall Town Hall was built in 1897 to the designs of local architect Thomas Newall, and remained in civic use until the borough council's demise in 1965.

The borough was granted a coat of arms on incorporation in 1936. The design featured thorn trees alluding to the old Elthorne Hundred and the 'south holt' and the 'north wood' commemorated in the name Southall-Norwood. The dexter supporter was a red griffin, a device used by the London Passenger Transport Board. This, together with the motto For All (a translation of the Latin "omnibus") referred to the fact that the factory of AEC, manufacturer of the LPTB's buses was in the borough. Southall's other industries were illustrated in the crest above the shield: wheat-ears for food processing and flaming torches for gas and electricity production.
