= Spelthorne (constituency) =

Parliamentary constituency in the United Kingdom, 1918 onwards

Coordinates: 51.42°N 0.46°W

- Borough constituency for the House of Commons
- Boundaries since 1983
- Boundary of Spelthorne in South East England
- County: Surrey
- Electorate: 72,897 (2023)
- Major settlements: Sunbury-on-Thames; Staines-upon-Thames; Ashford; Stanwell

Current constituency
- Created: 1918
- Member of Parliament: Lincoln Jopp (Conservative)
- Seats: One
- Created from: Uxbridge
- During its existence contributed to new seat(s) of: Feltham (all); Southall (small part)

Spelthorne is a constituency (Note: A borough constituency (for the purposes of election expenses and type of returning officer)) in Surrey, represented in the House of Commons of the UK Parliament since 2024 by Lincoln Jopp, a Conservative. (Note: As with all constituencies, the constituency elects one Member of Parliament (MP) by the first past the post system of election at least every five years.)

== Constituency profile ==
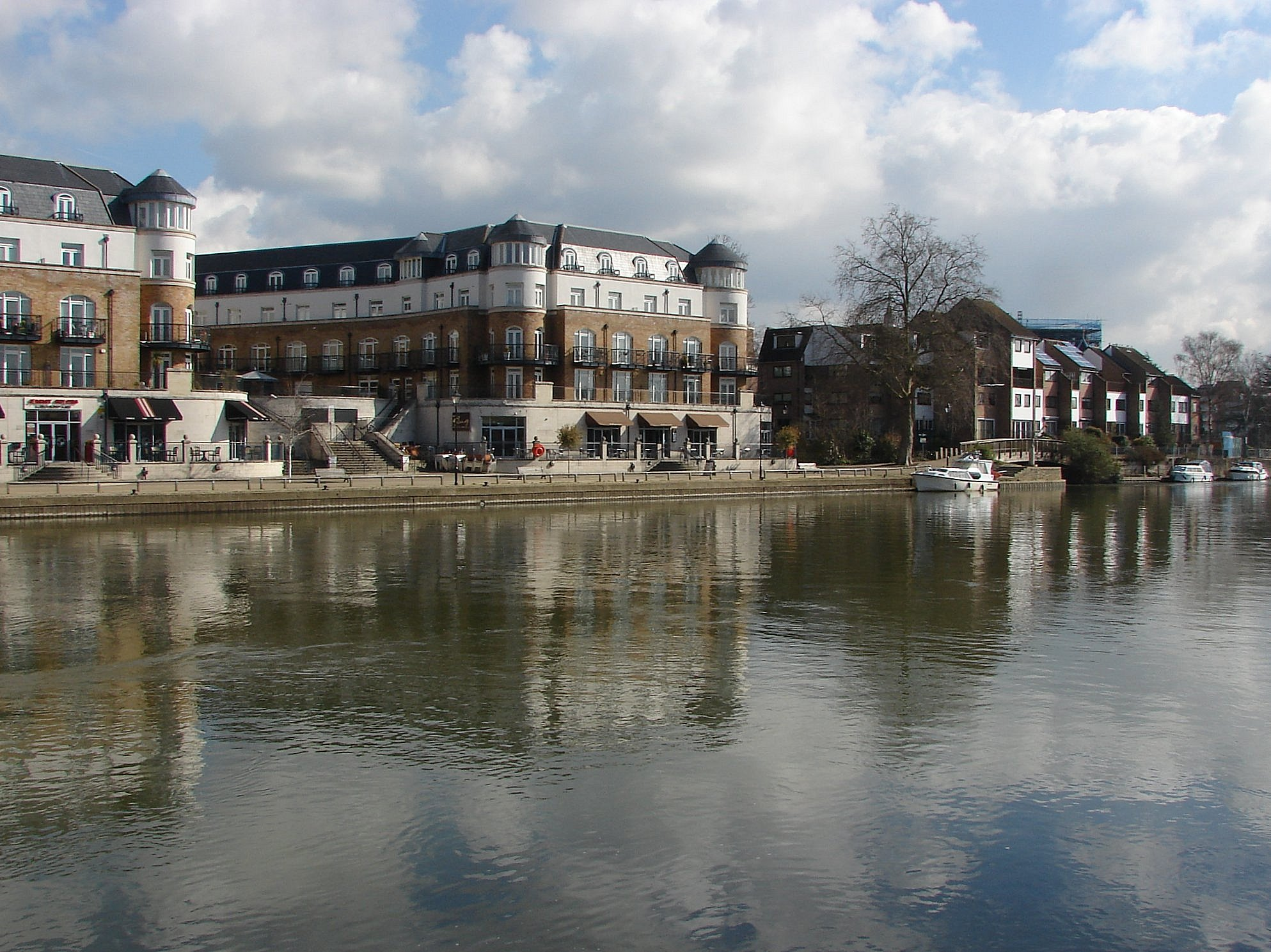
The River Thames at Staines

Spelthorne is a constituency in Surrey in South East England, and is coterminous with the borough of the same name. It includes the towns of Staines-upon-Thames, Ashford and Sunbury-on-Thames and the villages of Shepperton and Stanwell. The constituency is ultimately named after the Spelthorne Hundred, a medieval subdivision.

This is a mostly suburban constituency on the outskirts of the London commuter belt; it is located around 16 miles (26 km) south-west of the centre of the capital. Spelthorne is immediately south of Heathrow Airport bounded by a long meander of the River Thames. The constituency is mostly built-up with few green spaces or woodland; around 30% of its area is taken up by embanked reservoirs or low-lying floodplains whilst the rest is made up of residential development. The towns here are historic settlements that were largely rural until the interwar period. Staines and Sunbury are affluent towns with many large detached and semi-detached properties. Stanwell has high levels of deprivation and is mostly made up of estates built for council housing, much of which is still socially rented. House prices across Spelthorne are generally higher than the regional and UK averages.

Spelthorne has a below-average proportion of young adults and a large population of middle-aged adults. Residents have high levels of income and homeownership and the child poverty rate is low. They have average levels of education and a high proportion work in the technology, construction and transport sectors. The percentage claiming unemployment benefits is in line with the UK-wide rate. White people made up 79% of the population at the 2021 census. Asians, mostly of Indian origin, were the largest ethnic minority group at 13% and were largely concentrated in Stanwell.

At the local council, Staines and Sunbury are represented by Liberal Democrats, Ashford and Stanwell mostly by Reform UK and Shepperton by Conservatives. Voters in Spelthorne strongly supported leaving the European Union in the 2016 referendum; an estimated 60% voted in favour of Brexit compared to the UK-wide figure of 52%.

== Boundaries ==
1918–1945: The Urban Districts of Feltham, Hampton, Hampton Wick, Staines, Sunbury-on-Thames, and Teddington, and the Rural District of Staines.

1945–1950: The Urban Districts of Feltham, Staines, Sunbury-on-Thames, and Yiewsley and West Drayton.

1950–1955: The Urban Districts of Feltham, Staines, and Sunbury-on-Thames.

1955–1983: The Urban Districts of Staines and Sunbury-on-Thames.

1983–present: The Borough of Spelthorne (same content as above)

== History of boundaries ==
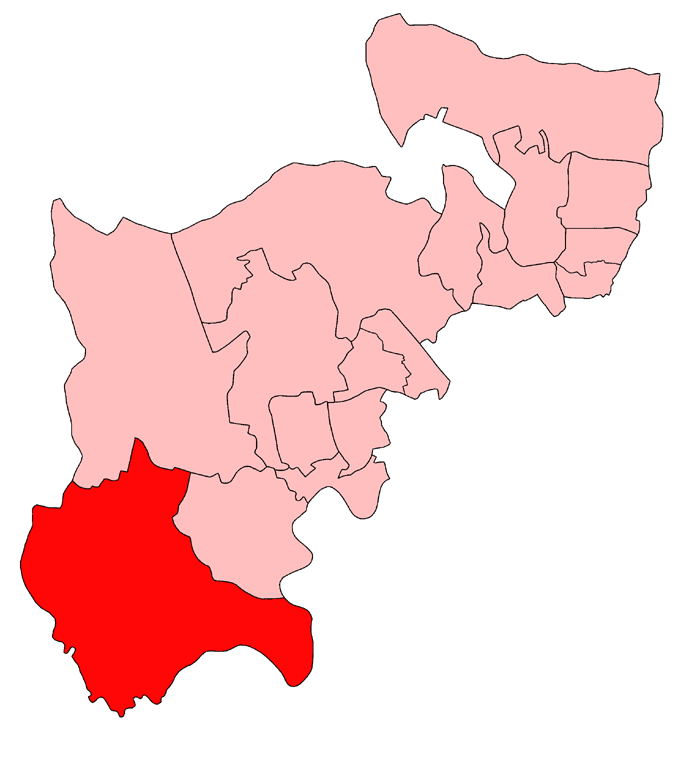
Spelthorne in Middlesex 1918–1945

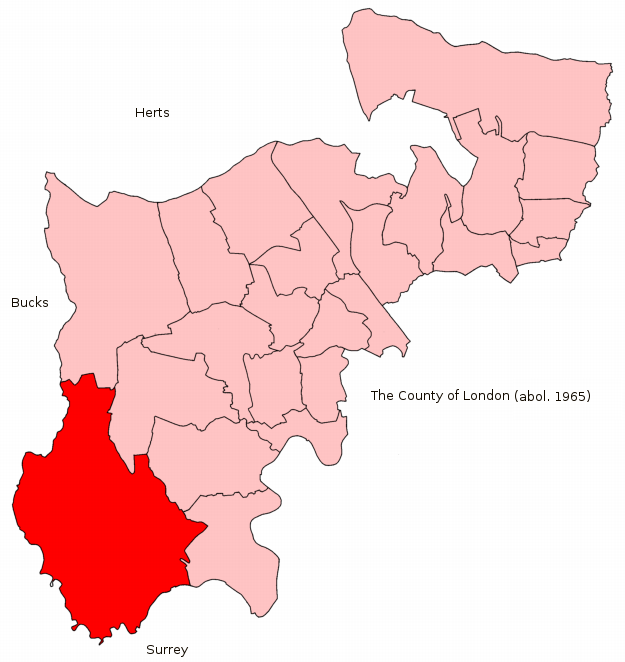
Spelthorne in Middlesex 1945–1950

Map that gives each named seat and any constant electoral success for national (Westminster) elections for Middlesex, 1955 to 1974.

Spelthorne from 1955 onwards (shown within its county since 1965, Surrey)

Spelthorne was one of six hundreds of the historic county of Middlesex which covered its south west. It had thirteen historic parishes whereas the modern borough and seat has seven. The London Government Act 1963 placed the historic county in London except for two areas, one being the seven south-westernmost parishes of Spelthorne and Middlesex, placed since the commencement of the Act in April 1965 in Surrey.

From 1885 to 1918 it was in the inceptive Uxbridge seat, before which its electorate contributed to the two-seat Middlesex constituency since the 13th century creation of the House of Commons of England.

=== 1918–1945 ===
The seat was created by the Representation of the People Act 1918 and amounted to the larger, slightly less built-up part of the increasingly outer metropolitan Uxbridge seat which was split, in 1918, in two. It was given county seat status for unimportant logistical purposes. It amounted to the obsolete hundred plus the small west-to-east parishes in the north of Harmondsworth, Harlington and Cranford as the seat took in seven late 19th century-formed areas of local government, including the Staines Rural District. Due to the incursion into Elthorne Hundred the seat could have more accurately been named South West Middlesex.

=== 1945–1950 ===
For the post-war 1945 election the seat lost an eastern section: three of the historic parishes namely Hampton, Hampton Wick and Teddington to the Twickenham seat (which shifted substantially south, shedding Labour-leaning Hounslow). The seat saw a northern exchange. It gained two small parishes (one of which, Yiewsley was of modern creation) to the NNW from its parent seat. It lost the similarly small Cranford and Harlington parishes to form, with parts of the parent seat, the new seat of Southall, which the incumbent for Spelthorne went on to represent in 1950.

=== 1950–1955 ===
In 1950 the seat was defined by the 1948 Act as the urban districts of Feltham, Staines and Sunbury on Thames; Yiewsley and West Drayton were returned to the Uxbridge seat.

=== 1955 onwards ===
In the 1955 redistribution Feltham became the southwest of the new Feltham seat. Since 1955 the seat has comprised the former urban districts of Staines and Sunbury-on-Thames, added in local government to Surrey in 1965, and merged in 1974 to form in local government the Borough of Spelthorne.

The seat was categorised as a borough constituency from the February 1974 general election and for that election unaffected in the periodic redistribution. In 1995 the small settlement of Poyle, transferred from Buckinghamshire to the area in 1974 and long part of the possessions of Stanwell in Middlesex, was transferred to the Borough of Slough.

The Boundary Commission recommended no changes to this seat in their fully implemented Fifth Review for the 2010 election, nor under the 2023 periodic review of Westminster constituencies which came into effect for the 2024 general election.

== History of results ==
The 1918 to 1945 broadest, initial version of the parliamentary division saw no marginal majorities and can be squarely analysed as a Conservative safe seat based on length of party tenure and size of majorities.

In the 1945 general election George Pargiter (Lab) was elected in the Attlee Ministry landslide while the boundaries of the seat saw a favourable form to the party during expansion of London when the area extended to areas to the north, including Feltham and Bedfont (removed in 1955 — see Feltham and Heston) and had cast off Hampton, Hampton Wick and Teddington, before 1945 part of the seat.

Since the 1955 boundary reduction and a local emphasis or demand upon private housing relative to social housing, the reduced area has eight Conservative candidate majorities of greater than 11% and three lower majorities: 1966, 1997 and 2001. The earliest of these produced the narrowest margin of victory, 5% of the vote. Based on length of party tenure and majorities the seat would be considered safe by most UK electoral analysts including of academic standing.

== Members of Parliament ==
The constituency's first MP was Philip Pilditch, an architect who piloted the Ancient Monuments Act 1931 through Parliament: see Scheduled Monument. The most recent MP for Spelthorne (prior to the 2024 election) was the former Chancellor, Kwasi Kwarteng (first elected in 2010).

Uxbridge prior to 1918

Election	Member	Party
1918	Sir Philip Pilditch	Coalition Conservative
1922	Sir Philip Pilditch	Conservative
1931	Reginald Blaker	Conservative
1945	Major loss of territory to east	
1945	George Pargiter	Labour
1950	Minor loss of territory in north-west	
1950	Beresford Craddock	Conservative
1970	Humphrey Atkins	Conservative
1987	David Wilshire	Conservative
2010	Kwasi Kwarteng	Conservative
2024	Lincoln Jopp	Conservative

== Elections ==
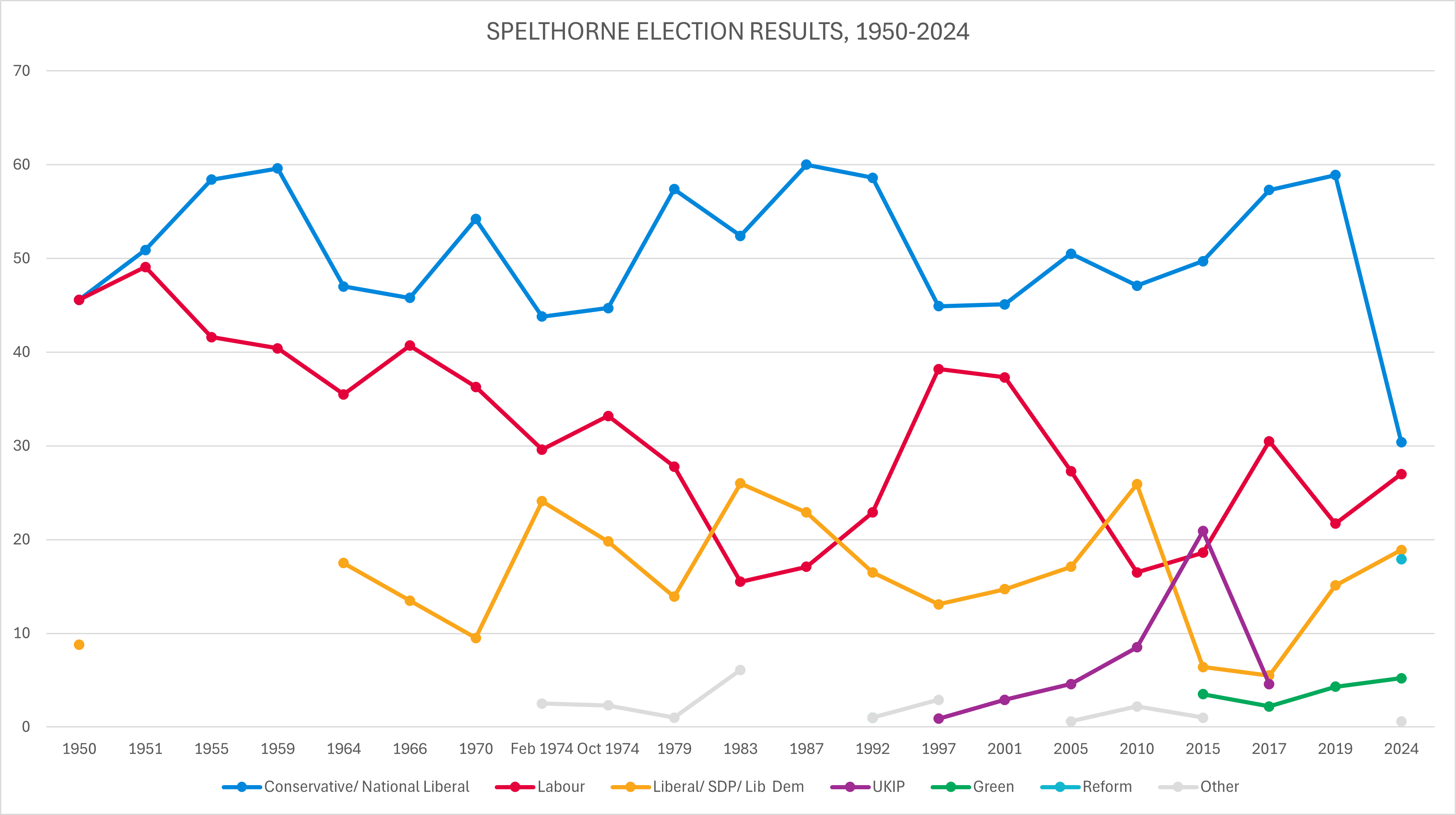
Election results 1950-2024

=== Elections in the 2020s ===
General election 2024: Spelthorne
Party	Candidate	Votes	%	±%
Conservative	Lincoln Jopp	14,038	30.4	−28.5
Labour	Claire Tighe	12,448	27.0	+5.3
Liberal Democrats	Harry Boparai	8,710	18.9	+3.8
Reform	Rory O'Brien	8,284	17.9	New
Green	Manu Singh	2,413	5.2	+0.9
SDP	Alistair Miller	273	0.6	New
Majority		1,590	3.4	−33.8
Turnout		46,166	63.0	−6.8
Registered electors		73,782		
Conservative hold		Swing	−16.9	

=== Elections in the 2010s ===
General election 2019: Spelthorne
Party	Candidate	Votes	%	±%
Conservative	Kwasi Kwarteng	29,141	58.9	+1.6
Labour	Pavitar Mann	10,748	21.7	−8.8
Liberal Democrats	David Campanale	7,499	15.1	+9.6
Green	Paul Jacobs	2,122	4.3	+2.1
Majority		18,393	37.2	+10.4
Turnout		49,510	69.8	+0.8
Conservative hold		Swing	+5.2	

General election 2017: Spelthorne
Party	Candidate	Votes	%	±%
Conservative	Kwasi Kwarteng	28,692	57.3	+7.6
Labour	Rebecca Geach	15,267	30.5	+11.9
Liberal Democrats	Rosie Shimell	2,755	5.5	−0.9
UKIP	Redvers Cunningham	2,296	4.6	−16.3
Green	Paul Jacobs	1,105	2.2	−1.3
Majority		13,425	26.8	−2.0
Turnout		50,115	69.0	+0.1
Conservative hold		Swing	−2.1	

General election 2015: Spelthorne
Party	Candidate	Votes	%	±%
Conservative	Kwasi Kwarteng	24,386	49.7	+2.6
UKIP	Redvers Cunningham	10,234	20.9	+12.4
Labour	Rebecca Geach	9,114	18.6	+2.1
Liberal Democrats	Rosie Shimell	3,163	6.4	−19.5
Green	Paul Jacobs	1,724	3.5	New
Independent	Juliet Griffith	230	0.5	New
TUSC	Paul Couchman	228	0.5	+0.1
Majority		14,152	28.8	+7.6
Turnout		49,079	68.9	+1.8
Conservative hold		Swing		

General election 2010: Spelthorne
Party	Candidate	Votes	%	±%
Conservative	Kwasi Kwarteng	22,261	47.1	−3.4
Liberal Democrats	Mark Chapman	12,242	25.9	+8.8
Labour	Adam Tyler-Moore	7,789	16.5	−10.8
UKIP	Christopher Browne	4,009	8.5	+3.9
Independent	Ian Swinglehurst	314	0.7	New
Best of a Bad Bunch	Rod Littlewood	244	0.5	New
TUSC	Paul Couchman	176	0.4	New
Campaign for Independent Politicians	John Gore	167	0.4	New
Independents Federation UK – Honesty, Integrity, Democracy	Grahame Leon-Smith	102	0.2	New
Majority		10,019	21.2	−2.0
Turnout		47,304	67.1	+4.4
Conservative hold		Swing		

=== Elections in the 2000s ===
General election 2005: Spelthorne
Party	Candidate	Votes	%	±%
Conservative	David Wilshire	21,620	50.5	+5.4
Labour	Keith Dibble	11,684	27.3	−10.0
Liberal Democrats	Simon James	7,318	17.1	+2.4
UKIP	Christopher Browne	1,968	4.6	+1.7
UK Community Issues Party	Caroline Schwark	239	0.6	New
Majority		9,936	23.2	+15.4
Turnout		42,829	62.8	+2.0
Conservative hold		Swing	+7.7	

General election 2001: Spelthorne
Party	Candidate	Votes	%	±%
Conservative	David Wilshire	18,851	45.1	+0.2
Labour	Andrew Shaw	15,589	37.3	−0.9
Liberal Democrats	Martin Rimmer	6,156	14.7	+1.6
UKIP	Richard Squire	1,198	2.9	+2.0
Majority		3,262	7.8	+1.1
Turnout		41,794	60.8	−12.8
Conservative hold		Swing	+0.6	

=== Elections in the 1990s ===
General election 1997: Spelthorne
Party	Candidate	Votes	%	±%
Conservative	David Wilshire	23,306	44.9	−13.7
Labour	Keith Dibble	19,833	38.2	+15.3
Liberal Democrats	Edward Glynn	6,821	13.1	−3.4
Referendum	Barney Coleman	1,495	2.9	New
UKIP	John Fowler	462	0.9	New
Majority		3,473	6.7	−28.9
Turnout		51,917	73.6	−6.8
Conservative hold		Swing	−14.5	

General election 1992: Spelthorne
Party	Candidate	Votes	%	±%
Conservative	David Wilshire	32,627	58.6	−1.4
Labour	Ann Leedham	12,784	22.9	+5.8
Liberal Democrats	Roger Roberts	9,702	16.5	−6.4
Green	J Wassell	580	1.0	New
Monster Raving Loony	D Rea	338	0.6	New
Natural Law	D Ellis	195	0.4	New
Majority		19,843	35.6	−1.5
Turnout		55,726	80.4	+6.3
Conservative hold		Swing		

=== Elections in the 1980s ===
General election 1987: Spelthorne
Party	Candidate	Votes	%	±%
Conservative	David Wilshire	32,440	60.0	+7.6
SDP	Mavis Cunningham	12,390	22.9	−3.1
Labour	Damian Welfare	9,227	17.1	+1.6
Majority		20,050	37.1	+10.7
Turnout		54,057	74.1	+3.1
Conservative hold		Swing	+5.3	

General election 1983: Spelthorne
Party	Candidate	Votes	%	±%
Conservative	Humphrey Atkins	26,863	52.4	−5.0
SDP	Alexander Layton	13,357	26.0	+12.1
Labour	Murray Rowlands	7,926	15.5	−12.3
Ind. Conservative	Richard Adams	2,816	5.5	New
FTACMP	E.J. Butterfield	325	0.6	New
Majority		13,506	26.4	−3.2
Turnout		51,287	71.0	−5.9
Conservative hold		Swing		

=== Elections in the 1970s ===
General election 1979: Spelthorne
Party	Candidate	Votes	%	±%
Conservative	Humphrey Atkins	31,290	57.40	+12.67
Labour	C.H. Dodwell	15,137	27.77	−5.46
Liberal	Paul Winner	7,565	13.88	−5.87
National Front	J. Sawyer	518	0.95	−1.25
Majority		16,153	29.63	+18.12
Turnout		54,510	76.89	+2.40
Conservative hold		Swing	+10.02	

General election October 1974: Spelthorne
Party	Candidate	Votes	%	±%
Conservative	Humphrey Atkins	23,125	44.73	+0.90
Labour	C.H. Dodwell	17,177	33.23	+3.66
Liberal	Paul Winner	10,212	19.75	−4.37
National Front	J.M. Clifton	1,180	2.28	−0.20
Majority		5,948	11.50	−2.74
Turnout		51,694	74.49	−7.64
Conservative hold		Swing	−2.33	

General election February 1974: Spelthorne
Party	Candidate	Votes	%	±%
Conservative	Humphrey Atkins	24,772	43.83	−10.38
Labour	J.H.W. Grant	16,713	29.57	−6.69
Liberal	Paul Winner	13,632	24.12	+14.59
National Front	E.J. Butterfield	1,399	2.48	New
Majority		8,059	14.26	−3.69
Turnout		56,516	82.13	+8.79
Conservative hold		Swing	−0.21	

General election 1970: Spelthorne
Party	Candidate	Votes	%	±%
Conservative	Humphrey Atkins	27,266	54.21	+8.42
Labour	Patrick L. Cheney	18,239	36.26	−4.46
Liberal	Ronald Henry Longland	4,792	9.53	−3.97
Majority		9,027	17.95	+12.88
Turnout		50,297	73.34	−7.55
Conservative hold		Swing	+6.99	

=== Elections in the 1960s ===
General election 1966: Spelthorne
Party	Candidate	Votes	%	±%
Conservative	Beresford Craddock	22,473	45.79	−1.23
Labour	Ronald G Wallace	19,986	40.72	+5.19
Liberal	Nesta Wyn Ellis	6,624	13.50	−3.95
Majority		2,487	5.07	−6.42
Turnout		49,083	80.89	+0.76
Conservative hold		Swing	−4.03	

General election 1964: Spelthorne
Party	Candidate	Votes	%	±%
Conservative	Beresford Craddock	22,230	47.02	−12.54
Labour	Richard S Stokes	16,797	35.53	−4.91
Liberal	Maurice J Hayes	8,252	17.45	New
Majority		5,433	11.49	−7.62
Turnout		47,279	80.13	−1.13
Conservative hold		Swing	−2.60	

=== Elections in the 1950s ===
General election 1959: Spelthorne
Party	Candidate	Votes	%	±%
Conservative	Beresford Craddock	25,221	59.56	+1.20
Labour	James Pirrie Carruthers	17,128	40.44	−1.20
Majority		8,093	19.12	+2.40
Turnout		42,349	81.26	+3.53
Conservative hold		Swing	+1.20	

General election 1955: Spelthorne
Party	Candidate	Votes	%	±%
Conservative	Beresford Craddock	20,888	58.36	+7.44
Labour	James Pirrie Carruthers	14,906	41.64	−7.44
Majority		5,982	16.72	+15.88
Turnout		35,794	77.73	−6.21
Conservative hold		Swing	+7.44	

General election 1951: Spelthorne
Party	Candidate	Votes	%	±%
Conservative	Beresford Craddock	31,031	50.92	+5.29
Labour	Albert Hunter	29,908	49.08	+3.51
Majority		1,123	1.84	+1.79
Turnout		60,939	83.94	+2.17
Conservative hold		Swing	+0.89	

Boundary changes

General election 1950: Spelthorne
Party	Candidate	Votes	%	±%
Conservative	Beresford Craddock	26,177	45.63	+9.11
Labour	Frederick Wilson Temple	26,146	45.57	−6.39
Liberal	Francis Joseph Halpin	5,048	8.80	−2.72
Majority		31	0.06	N/A
Turnout		57,371	81.77	+11.48
Conservative gain from Labour		Swing	+8.75	

=== Elections in the 1940s ===
General election 1945: Spelthorne
Party	Candidate	Votes	%	±%
Labour	George Pargiter	28,064	51.96	+20.32
Conservative	Ian Harvey	19,725	36.52	−31.84
Liberal	Henry Kerby	6,222	11.52	New
Majority		8,339	15.44	N/A
Turnout		54,011	70.29	+12.33
Labour gain from Conservative		Swing	−27.08	

=== Elections in the 1930s ===
General election 1935: Spelthorne
Party	Candidate	Votes	%	±%
Conservative	Reginald Blaker	30,153	68.36	−10.37
Labour	Bernard Lytton-Bernard	13,957	31.64	+10.37
Majority		16,196	36.72	−20.75
Turnout		44,110	57.96	−10.38
Conservative hold		Swing	−10.38	

General election 1931: Spelthorne
Party	Candidate	Votes	%	±%
Conservative	Reginald Blaker	34,115	78.73	+29.37
Labour	Frederick Wilson Temple	9,214	21.27	−9.48
Majority		24,901	57.46	+38.85
Turnout		43,329	68.34	−0.68
Conservative hold		Swing	+17.12	

=== Elections in the 1920s ===
General election 1929: Spelthorne
Party	Candidate	Votes	%	±%
Unionist	Philip Pilditch	19,177	49.36	−20.01
Labour	Frederick Wilson Temple	11,946	30.75	+0.12
Liberal	William A.J. Hillier	7,727	19.89	New
Majority		7,231	18.61	−20.14
Turnout		38,850	69.02	+4.45
Unionist hold		Swing	−7.76	

General election 1924: Spelthorne
Party	Candidate	Votes	%	±%
Unionist	Philip Pilditch	17,650	69.37	+2.96
Labour	Frederick Wilson Temple	7,792	30.63	−2.96
Majority		9,858	38.74	+5.91
Turnout		25,442	64.57	+18.62
Conservative hold		Swing	+2.96	

General election 1923: Spelthorne
Party	Candidate	Votes	%	±%
Unionist	Philip Pilditch	11,604	66.41	+1.73
Labour	G.S. Cockrill	5,868	33.59	−1.73
Majority		5,736	32.82	+3.45
Turnout		17,472	45.95	−7.95
Unionist hold		Swing	+1.73	

General election 1922: Spelthorne
Party	Candidate	Votes	%	±%
Unionist	Philip Pilditch	12,849	64.68	−13.04
Labour	Archibald Church	7,015	35.32	+20.19
Majority		5,834	29.36	−33.21
Turnout		19,864	53.90	+8.25
Unionist hold		Swing	−19.02	

=== Elections in the 1910s ===
General election 1918: Spelthorne
Party		Candidate	Votes	%
C	Unionist	Philip Pilditch	12,423	77.72
	Labour	Frank Ernest Horton	2,418	15.13
	NFDDSS	Alexander William Leonard	1,143	7.15
Majority			10,005	62.59
Turnout			15,984	45.65
	Unionist win (new seat)			
C indicates candidate endorsed by the coalition government.

== See also ==
- List of parliamentary constituencies in Surrey
- List of parliamentary constituencies in the South East England (region)

== Sources ==
- Election result, 2010 (BBC)
- Election result, 2005 (BBC)
- Election results, 1997 – 2001 (BBC)
- Election results, 1997 – 2001 (Election Demon)
- Election results, 1983 – 1992 (Election Demon)
- Election results, 1992 – 2010 (Guardian)
- Election results, 1945 – 1979 (Politics Resources)
- Boundaries of Parliamentary Constituencies 1885–1972, compiled and edited by F.W.S. Craig (Parliamentary Reference Publications 1972)
- Britain Votes 4: British Parliamentary Election Results 1983–1987, compiled and edited by F.W.S. Craig (Parliamentary Research Services 1988)
- Britain Votes 5: British Parliamentary Election Results 1988–1992, compiled and edited by Colin Rallings and Michael Thrasher (Parliamentary Research Services/Dartmouth Publishing 1993)
- British Parliamentary Election Results 1918–1949, compiled and edited by F.W.S. Craig (Macmillan Press, revised edition 1977)
- British Parliamentary Election Results 1950–1973, compiled and edited by F.W.S. Craig (Parliamentary Research Services 1983).
- British Parliamentary Election Results 1974–1983, compiled and edited by F.W.S. Craig (Parliamentary Research Services 1984)
- Who's Who of British Members of Parliament, Volume III 1919–1945, edited by M. Stenton and S. Lees (Harvester Press 1979)
- Who's Who of British Members of Parliament, Volume IV 1945–1979, edited by M. Stenton and S. Lees (Harvester Press 1981)

Parliament of the United Kingdom
Preceded by Stratford-on-Avon	Constituency represented by the chancellor of the Exchequer; 2022	Succeeded by South West Surrey
