= Potters Bar Urban District =

Former local authority in England

Coordinates: 51°41′N 0°12′W

Potters Bar Urban District South Mimms Rural District (1894–1934)
- Rural district (1894–1934); Urban district (1934–1974)
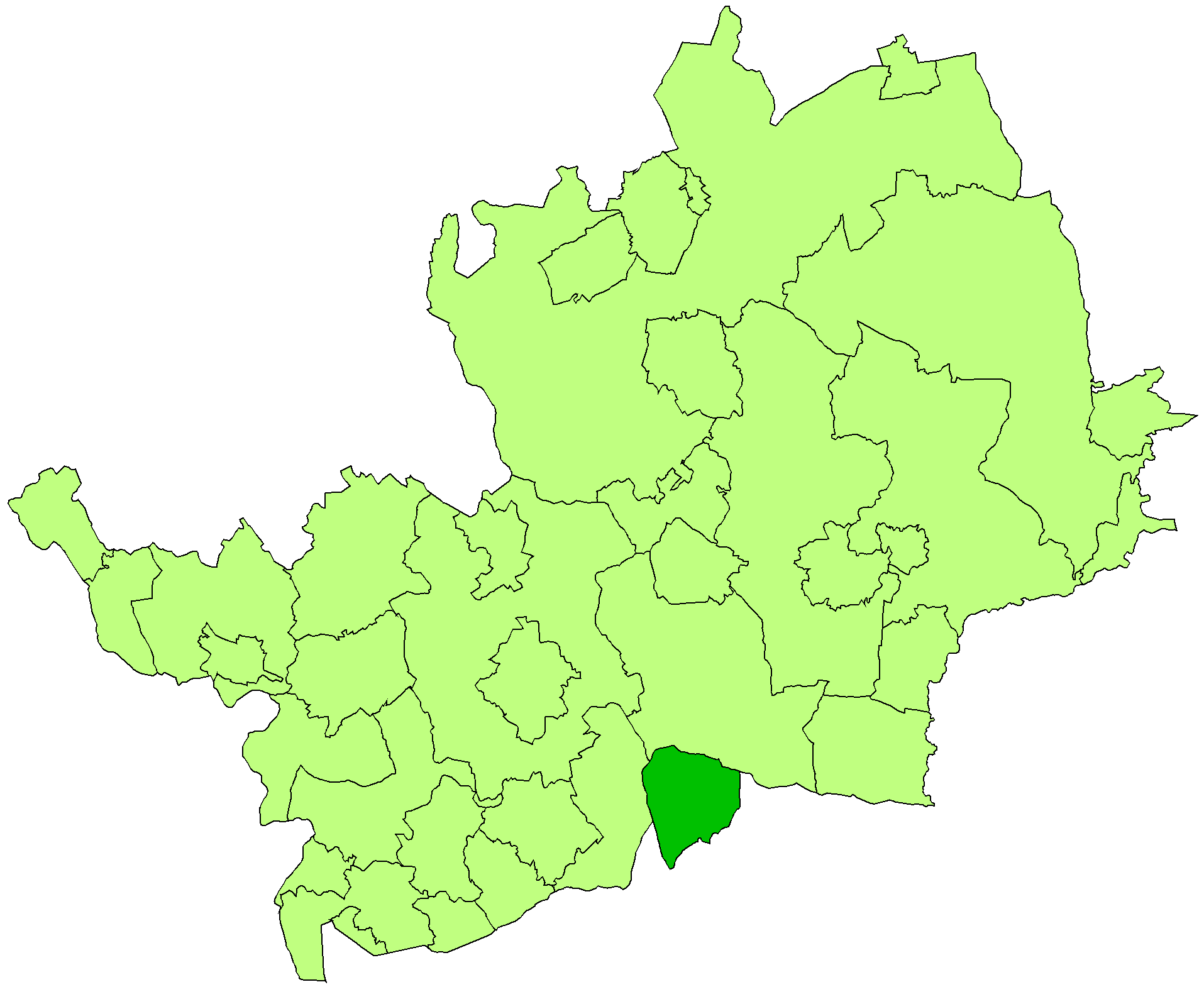
- Potters Bar within Hertfordshire in 1971
- Area
  - 1911: 6,105 acres (24.7 km^{2})
  - 1931: 6,129 acres (24.8 km^{2})
  - 1971: 6,129 acres (24.8 km^{2})
- Population
  - 1901: 2,671
  - 1931: 5,720
  - 1971: 23,950
- History
  - Created: 28 December 1894 (as South Mimms Rural District); 1 April 1934 (as Potters Bar Urban District)
  - Abolished: 31 March 1974
  - Succeeded by: Hertsmere
- Government: South Mimms Rural District Council; Potters Bar Urban District Council
  - HQ: Barnet (1894–1932); Potters Bar (1932–1974)
- Contained within
  - County Council: Middlesex (1894–1965); Hertfordshire (1965–1974)

Potters Bar Urban District was a local government district in England from 1894 to 1974, covering the town of Potters Bar and the village of South Mimms. The district was initially called the South Mimms Rural District, being renamed in 1934.

Potters Bar Urban District was transferred from Middlesex to Hertfordshire in 1965, and abolished in 1974 to become part of Hertsmere.

== South Mimms ==
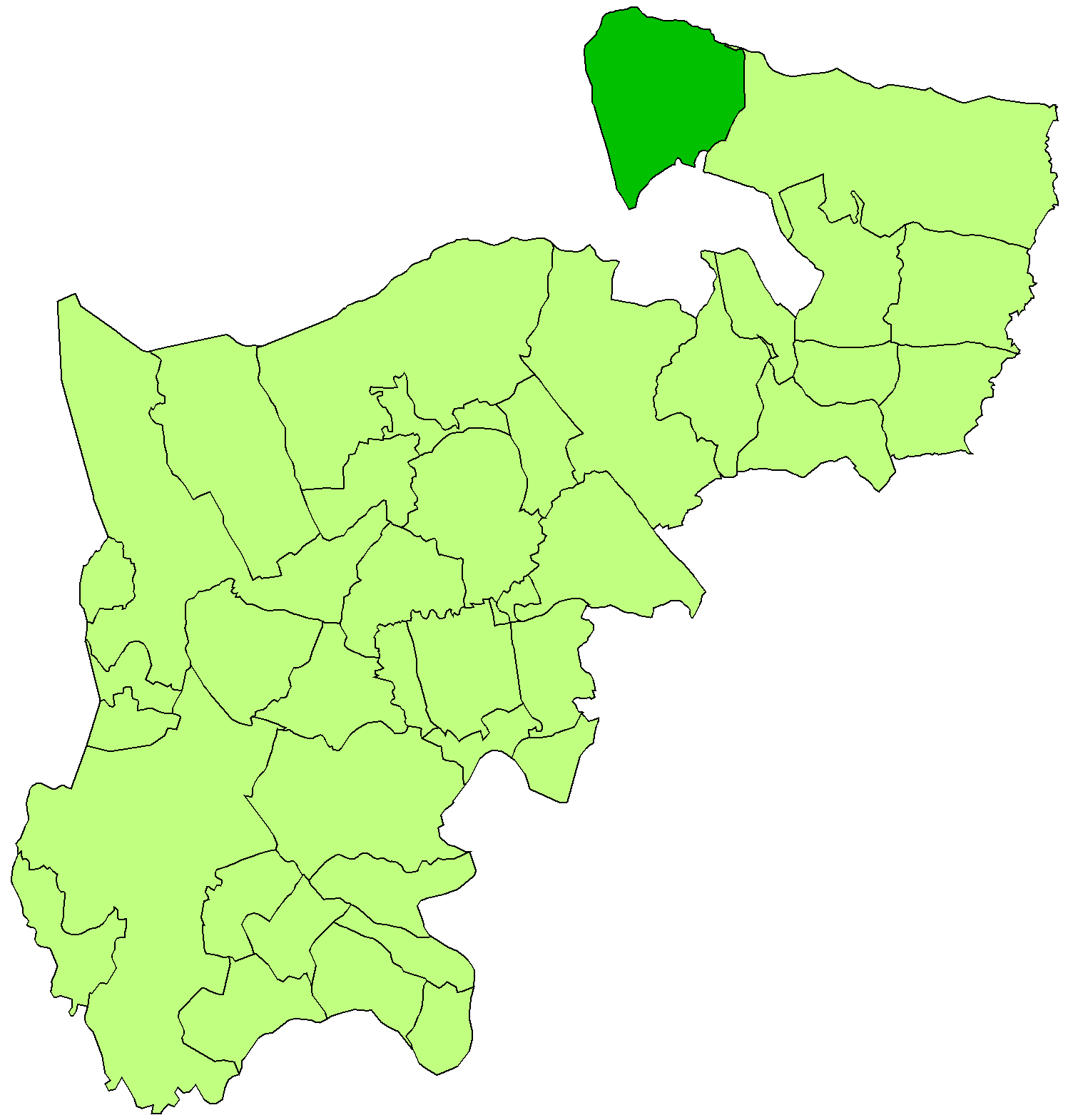
South Mimms within Middlesex in 1911

South Mimms Rural District had its origins in the Barnet Poor Law Union, which had been created in 1835. In 1872, rural sanitary districts were created, with the boards of guardians of poor law unions being made responsible for public health and local government for the rural parts of their districts. Under the Local Government Act 1894, rural sanitary districts became rural districts from 28 December 1894, and were split where they straddled county boundaries, as the Barnet Rural Sanitary District did. South Mimms Rural District was therefore created from those parts of the Barnet Rural Sanitary District which were within Middlesex, whilst the remainder of the Barnet Rural Sanitary District was in Hertfordshire, and became the Barnet Rural District.

South Mimms Rural District contained the single parish of South Mimms. As a rural district which contained only one parish, there was no separate parish council established for South Mimms; the South Mimms Rural District Council performed the duties that would otherwise have been a parish council's responsibility. The parish of South Mimms had been reduced in size shortly before the new rural district came into being, as parts of the old parish were within the urban districts of Barnet and East Barnet Valley. The part of the former South Mimms parish in Barnet became a new parish called South Mimms Urban, whilst the part of South Mimms within East Barnet Valley was added to the parish of Monken Hadley. The reduced South Mimms parish assumed its new boundaries with effect from the first parish meeting on 4 December 1894, ahead of the new rural district's creation on 28 December 1894.

The South Mimms parish and rural district was affected by further boundary changes in 1896, 1924 and 1926.

== Potters Bar ==
Potters Bar within Middlesex in 1961

On 1 April 1934 the South Mimms Rural District was reconstituted as an urban district and renamed Potters Bar Urban District, covering the same area.

The district was part of the review area of the Royal Commission on Local Government in Greater London, however it did not form part of the proposed Greater London area. In 1965, when Middlesex was abolished and most of its former area was transferred to Greater London under the London Government Act 1963, the Potters Bar Urban District was instead transferred to Hertfordshire.

== Premises ==
South Mimms Rural District Council held its first meeting on 3 January 1895 at the Barnet Union Workhouse at 17 Wellhouse Lane in Barnet, when John Osmond was appointed the council's first chairman. He had previously been the chairman of the old Barnet Rural Sanitary Authority. Until 1932 the council continued to meet in Barnet rather than in the district itself, meeting either at the workhouse or at 93 High Street, Barnet, which was the solicitor's office where the council's clerk was based. In 1932 the council moved to a house called Tancreed on Darkes Lane in Potters Bar, but would only be based there for three years. In 1935 the council purchased the neighbouring Osborne Nursery site, and converted the existing house there to become the council's offices and council chamber, holding its first meeting there in July 1935.

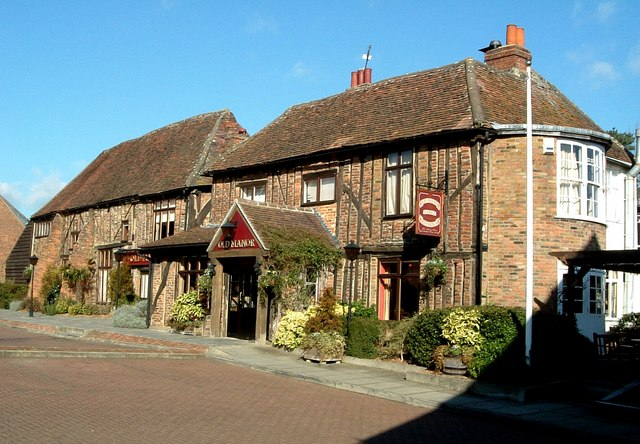
Wyllyotts Manor: used as one of the council's offices from 1937.

The council quickly outgrew the space at the former Osborne Nursery building on Darkes Lane, and in 1937 it purchased both Wyllyotts Manor, at the other end of Darkes Lane, and Oakmere House on High Street. The Osborne Nursery building remained the council's main office and meeting place, but Wyllyotts Manor and Oakmere House were used to provide extra office accommodation. In 1939 a new Potters Bar and District Hospital was built on Mutton Lane, and the council proposed building a new civic centre alongside it, but the scheme was abandoned due to the outbreak of the Second World War. In 1963 the council tried again to consolidate its functions onto a single site, proposing a new municipal building and public hall at Oakmere House, but that scheme did not proceed either.

== Abolition ==
Potters Bar Urban District was abolished under the Local Government Act 1972, merging with Elstree Rural District, Bushey Urban District and part of Watford Rural District to form the district of Hertsmere with effect from 1 April 1974. Hertsmere Borough Council chose to build its main offices in Borehamwood, and the former Potters Bar Urban District Council's buildings were gradually disposed of. The former Osborne Nursery building was demolished, with two houses (229 and 231 Darkes Lane) being built on the site. Oakmere House and Wyllyotts Manor both became public houses.
