= The Newark Academy =

School in Nottinghamshire, England

Coordinates: 53.062°N 0.788°W

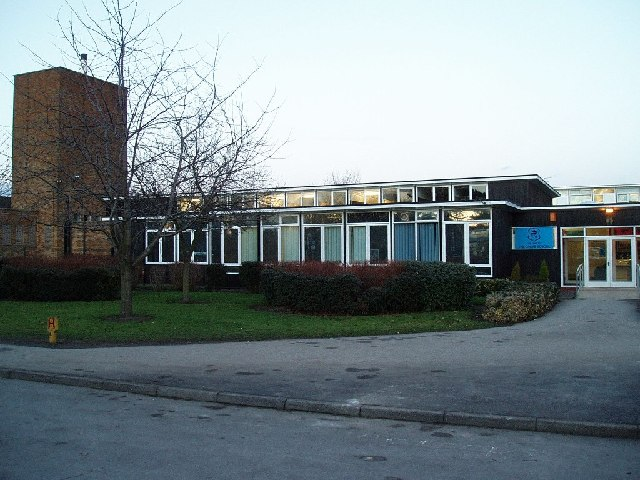
- Grove Comprehensive School in 2006
- Balderton/ Newark-on-Trent, Nottinghamshire; England

Information
- Type: Academy
- Motto: Work hard, Be kind
- Department for Education URN: 144489 Tables
- Ofsted: Reports
- Principal: Inma Peña
- Gender: Mixed
- Age: 11 to 18
- Enrolment: 1,026
- Houses: Pembroke, Warwick, Richmond, Stirling, Kenilworth
- Website: http://thenewarkacademy.org.uk/

The Newark Academy (formerly The Grove School) is a mixed secondary school in Balderton, Nottinghamshire, England.

== Admissions ==
The Newark Academy offers GCSEs, BTECs and Cambridge Nationals as programmes of study for pupils.

== History ==
=== Former grammar school ===
Newark had a former girls' grammar school, the Lilley and Stone Girls' School, similar to Retford's Retford High School for Girls. Barbara Dibb was the headmistress of this school from 1947 to 1971. The school was also known as the Lilley & Stone Foundation Newark High School for Girls.

=== Comprehensive ===
It merged with the Grove School in 1976 the pre-existing comprehensive school, sited at Balderton. Prior to this Lilley and Stone was a selective girls high school. Education in the Newark area, at that time was a mix of selective grammar/ secondary modern education and initially only the Grove was comprehensive.

The former Lilley and Stone School is a listed building. For the first three years at secondary school, attendance was at the Sconce Hills High School; Paul Upex, a school caretaker, murdered a 13-year-old girl at the school, being jailed in November 1988. The last two years before 16 were at the Lilley and Stone School. These two schools merged in 1997 to become the Newark High School. This school was in special measures between 1999 and 2001. Its small sixth form closed in 2003. By 2007, pupil numbers were expected to fall below 300, which was less than half the capacity of the school. This site closed as a school in 2008, becoming the academy's sixth form. The whole site closed in 2016.

The town's boys' grammar school became the Magnus Church of England School, still retaining most of its former name. Retford went comprehensive in 1979, and like Newark, has suffered from a haemorrhaging of admissions to schools outside of the town itself.

=== 1978 arson attack ===
An arson attack on 2 June 1978 at 12.30am caused £200,000 of damage to the staff room and headmistress study. It was the half-term holiday, a prevalent time for arson attacks. Fire engines from Newark, Collingham and Southwell, tackled the fire for five hours.

=== Academy chain ===
Previously a community school administered by Nottinghamshire County Council, The Grove School converted to academy status on 1 November 2012 and was renamed The Newark Academy. From Autumn 2016 the school will become part of the Torch Academy Gateway Trust. The school continues to coordinate with Nottinghamshire County Council for admissions.

=== New building ===
The school moved into a new building in January 2016 situated on part of the playing field, with the area occupied by the previous building being demolished and re-landscaped.

== Notable former pupils ==
- Toby Kebbell, actor

=== Lilley and Stone School ===
- Jenny Saville, artist

=== Lilley and Stone High School for Girls ===
- Julia Allison, General Secretary from 1994 to 1997 of the Royal College of Midwives (1951–58)
- Annette Cooper, Archdeacon of Colchester since 2004
- Enid Essame, Headmistress from 1943 to 1971 of Queenswood School, and President from 1962 to 1964 of the Association of Headmistresses of Boarding Schools (now the Girls' Schools Association)
- Sadie Hartley (nee Cook), businesswoman murdered by love rival in January 2016
- Elizabeth Rider, actress (1969–76)
