= Enid Essame =

British headmistress

"Emma" Essame
- Born: 5 December 1906; Sheffield
- Died: 19 December 1999 (aged 93); Potters Bar
- Education: Newnham College, Cambridge
- Occupation: headteacher
- Known for: leading Queenswood School
- Predecessor: Ethel Trew
- Successor: Margaret Ritchie

Enid Mary Essame aka "Emma" Essame (5 December 1906 – 19 December 1999) was a British headmistress whose whole career was teaching at Queenswood School. She led the school from 1944 to 1971.

== Life ==
Essame was born in Sheffield in 1906. Her Anglican parents were Kate and Oliver Essame. She had an elder sister and two younger brothers. Her father was a clerk for the railways and this caused the family to move to Newarke. She had spent nearly all her life in Leicester attending St Barnabas primary school and then becoming a scholarship girl at Wyggeston Grammar School for Girls and the move to Newarke meant that she had to repeat a year at the Lilley and Stone High School for Girls. Her good school results resumed and she won a scholarship to attend Newnham College in Cambridge in 1925. An additional grant and a year under King's College, London and she was a qualified teacher; and unemployed. Pernel Strachey at Newnham told her to apply to Queenswood School after her other applications failed to get her a job.

Ethel Trew at Queenswood gave her a job teaching. Trew's school in Hertfordshire was a private boarding school for girls and it had 240 students. By 1934 she had been identified as Trew's replacement as head of the school. The school paid for her to have a sabbatical and to obtain grants so that she could tour schools in the US and conduct research. She wrote up her observations as "A Comparative Study of the Aims and Objectives of American and British Education for Girls". She found that American schools allowed their girls more freedom and gave them less discipline than British schools. The girls were allowed more intellectual freedom and did not have such intensive character training. On the journey home she chanced to meet Baron Stamp who was the chair of the Queenswood governors. They spent many hours together planning the future of the school.

Queenswood's original school building and the head's house burnt down in 1936 and they were replaced with a nearly identical building. Her boss Ethel Trew had many successes but she took too many years to retire. Essame turned down other offers of headships as she waited over ten years for Trew to begin to partially retire in 1944. Even then Trew retained parts of the management including the school's estate. She had built herself a retirement home in the school grounds. Trew appointed a manager for the estate and he stole some of the school's money. Trew fully retired in 1948 and died shortly afterwards.

Essame was inspiring to the school's supporters and new money was found to support the school. She was in demand to represent the British Council and she was sent abroad to India and Pakistan, Nigeria and Russia. In 1957 she went to America again and this was the same year that a new science block and library were added to Queenswood. Three years later she became the President of the Association of Headmistresses of Boarding Schools. She had already been their honorary secretary and she held this post until 1964.

Essame served as head until 1971 and she was succeeded by Margaret Ritchie. Essame died in Potters Bar Community Hospital in 1999.
