= Ladbrooke School =

Former school in Potters Bar, Hertfordshire, England

Coordinates: 51°41′41″N 0°10′39″W

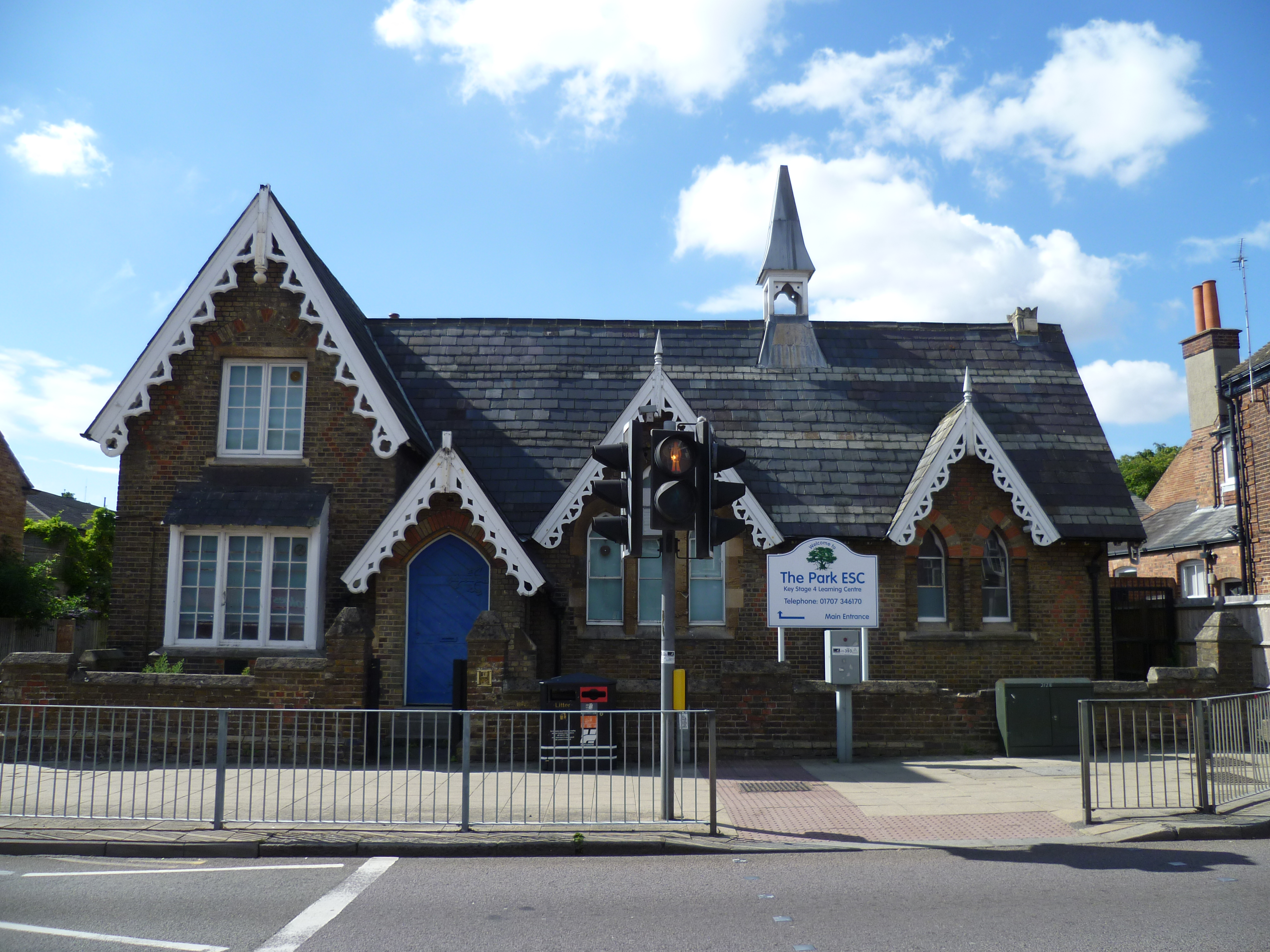
The former Ladbrooke School

Ladbrooke School is a former school in High Street, Potters Bar, England, and a grade II listed building with Historic England.
