= Wyllyotts Manor =

Pub in Potters Bar, Hertfordshire, England

Coordinates: 51.6966°N 0.1937°W

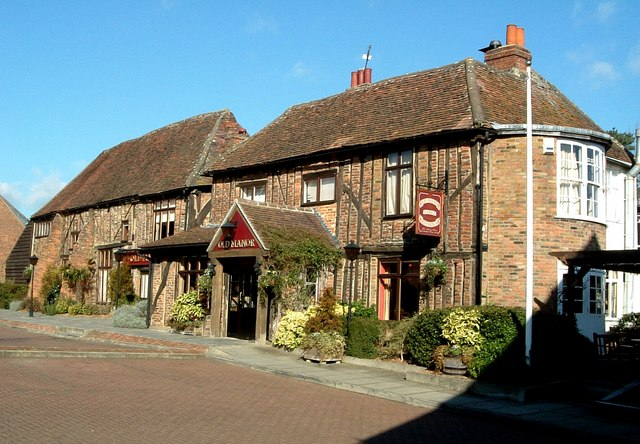
Wyllyotts Manor

Wyllyotts Manor is a public house and restaurant in Potters Bar, England, and a grade II listed building with Historic England. It consists of a late 16th-century barn, possibly built for Robert Taylor between 1594 and 1603, and a house that dates from around 1800.
