= Gracewood Academy =

Location
- Quakers Lane; Potters Bar, Hertfordshire, EN6 1EZ; England; 51°42′11″N 0°11′01″W

Information
- Type: Comprehensive; Academy
- Motto: Latin: Libertas Per Cultum (Freedom through Education)
- Established: 1954
- Local authority: Hertfordshire
- Specialist: Business and Enterprise College
- Department for Education URN: 137224 Tables
- Ofsted: Reports
- Headteacher: Geeta Patel
- Gender: Mixed
- Age: 11 to 18
- Enrolment: 611
- Website: www.mountgrace.herts.sch.uk

Gracewood Academy, formerly known as Mount Grace School, is a coeducational academy secondary school based in Potters Bar, Hertfordshire in England. It has 20 acres (8 ha) of grounds. It is one of the earliest (1954) purpose-built comprehensive schools in the UK.

== History ==
Mount Grace was originally a manor house built by the photographer Roger Fenton around 1853; it was named after his wife Grace. In 1949 the manor house was used as a children's home and in 1954 the school itself was built.

=== Local football ===
Potters Bar Town F.C. (originally named Mount Grace Old Scholars) was established on 29 June 1960 by the then PE Master Ken Barrett along with pupils and other old scholars. This is why the nickname of the team today is Scholars, referring to Mount Grace School. The name was changed to Potters Bar Town in 1991. In the early days of the team other staff members of the school also helped including Bert Wright, the school's caretaker.

In December 2025, the school became part of the Future Academies trust and rebranded from Mount Grace School to Gracewood Academy.
