= Pan Books =

Publishing imprint, part of Macmillan Publishers

- Parent company: Macmillan Publishers
- Founded: 1944
- Founder: Alan Bott
- Country of origin: United Kingdom
- Headquarters location: Clerkenwell, London
- Distribution: Macmillan Distribution (UK); Alliance Distribution Services (Australia) self-distributed (South Africa, India); Trafalgar Square Publishing (United States)
- Publication types: Books
- Official website: www.panmacmillan.com

1961 Pan Books edition of Ian Fleming's James Bond novel Goldfinger. Artist Sam Peffer's model for James Bond at the bottom was Pan's managing director of the time Ralph Vernon-Hunt.

Pan Books is a British publishing imprint that was founded in the 1940s and is now part of the British-based Macmillan Publishers, owned by the Georg von Holtzbrinck Publishing Group of Germany.

== History ==
Pan Books began as an independent publisher, established in 1944 by Alan Bott, previously known for his memoirs of his experiences as a flying ace in the First World War. The Pan Books logo, showing the ancient Greek god Pan playing pan-pipes, was designed by Mervyn Peake. The later version was by Edward Young who also designed the logo for Penguin.

A few years after it was founded, Pan Books was bought out by a consortium of several publishing houses, including Macmillan, Collins, Heinemann, and briefly, Hodder & Stoughton. It became wholly owned by Macmillan in 1987.

Pan specialised in publishing paperback fiction and, along with Penguin Books, was one of the first popular publishers of this format in the UK. Many popular authors saw their works given paperback publication through Pan, including Ian Fleming, whose James Bond series first appeared in paperback in the UK as Pan titles. So too did Leslie Charteris's books about The Saint, Peter O'Donnell's Modesty Blaise, and novels by Edgar Wallace, Agatha Christie, Erle Stanley Gardner, Peter Cheyney, Georgette Heyer, Neville Shute, John Steinbeck, Josephine Tey and Arthur Upfield. Pan also published paperback editions of works by classic authors such as Jane Austen and Charles Dickens. Another notable title published by Pan was The Hitchhiker's Guide to the Galaxy by Douglas Adams.

During the 1950s and 60s, Pan Books editions were noted for their colourful covers, which have made many of them collectables, particularly the Fleming and Charteris novels. Around 2,000 different pieces of cover artwork were commissioned by Pan between 1955 and 1965. Many of these artists remain largely unknown today. They include Rex Archer (1928–?), SR Boldero (1898–1987), Roger Hall, Edward Mortelmans, John Pollack (1918–1985), Sam Peffer, Dave Taylor (1921–1985), and Carl Wilton.

In the 1960s, "The Golden Pans" were established. The trophies were awarded to authors in recognition of one million copies sold: Ian Fleming was instantly awarded seven. Other authors have been awarded a Golden Pan include John Le Carre, Douglas Adams, Jackie Collins, Douglas Stuart and Hanya Yanighara. In February 2024, Lucinda Riley was posthoumously awarded a Golden Pan at an event celebrating 80 years of the publisher.

The Pan imprint continues to publish a broad list of popular fiction and nonfiction. Among its current authors are David Baldacci, Ann Cleeves, Peter James, Kristin Hannah, Kate Morton, Kate Mosse, Lucinda Riley, C.J. Sansom, and Danielle Steel.
