= Muriel Nissel =

British statistician and civil servant (1921–2010)

- Born: Muriel Griffiths; 30 January 1921; Fulham, London, England
- Died: 2010 (aged 88–89)
- Education: Queenswood School
- Alma mater: St Hugh's College, Oxford
- Occupations: Statistician and civil servant
- Spouses: William Hans Barbour; Siegmund Nissel
- Children: 2

Muriel Nissel (née Griffiths; 30 January 1921 – 2010) was a British statistician and civil servant. Together with Claus Moser, she created "a national survey analysing trends in social welfare", that was to become Social Trends, first published in 1970, and considered to be the "statistician's bible", before working on the "distribution and redistribution of wealth". Nissel also wrote well-regarded books, including People Count – a history of the General Register Office, and Married to the Amadeus: Life with a String Quartet.

== Early life ==
She was born Muriel Griffiths on 30 January 1921 at 38 Perham Road, Fulham, London, the only child of Evan Griffiths, a civil servant who worked for the General Post Office, and his wife, Bessie May Griffiths, née Phillips, a governess.

She grew up in Potters Bar, Middlesex. She was educated at Queenswood School, in Hatfield, having won a boarding scholarship, followed by St Hugh's College, Oxford, where she earned a first-class degree in philosophy, politics, and economics in 1942.

== Career ==
After Oxford, she joined the Ministry of Fuel and Power in 1942, working as an economic statistician for Harold Wilson the future Prime Minister.

In 1964 Nissel joined the London School of Economics as a research assistant, working there with Professor Claus Moser, who became her mentor. Later in 1964, Nissel also joined the government's Central Statistical Office (CSO) as a financial statistician.

In 1967 she and Moser started work on "a national survey analysing trends in social welfare", that was to become Social Trends, first published in 1970, and considered to be the "statistician's bible". She edited Social Trends until 1975, when she began work on the "distribution and redistribution of wealth".

Nissel also wrote well-regarded books, including People Count – a history of the General Register Office, and Married to the Amadeus: Life with a String Quartet.

== Publications ==
- People Count: A History of the General Register Office, HMSO, 1987. ISBN 0-11-691183-2
- Married to the Amadeus: Life with a String Quartet, ISBN 1-900357-12-7, Giles de la Mare Publishers Limited

== Personal life ==
On 26 January 1946, she married William Hans Barbour (1913–2000), and they later divorced. On 5 April 1957, having changed her name to Muriel Morley, she married Siegmund Walter "Sigi" Nissel (1922–2008), the violinist and member of the Amadeus Quartet. They had two children, Claire (born 1958) and Daniel (born 1962).
