= Sam Peffer =

British commercial artist

Peffer's cover for the Pan paperback edition of From Russia with Love, 1959

The cover of Scorpion Reef (1958) by Charles Williams featured Peffer in boxing stance and his stuntman brother-in-law, Jack Cooper, being knocked out of the boat.

Peffer's poster for Hussy (1980), starring Helen Mirren and John Shea

Samuel John Peffer (known as Peff; 3 November 1921 – 14 March 2014) was a British commercial artist who designed film posters, paperback book covers and the covers of home videos. His best known work was for the covers of the paperback James Bond novels published by Pan Books in the 1950s and 1960s, for which he created a consistent and distinctive style.

== Early life and war service ==
Peffer was born in Islington, London, into a poor family, the son of an interior decorator. He left school at 13, working first as an errand boy for Leon Goodman Displays, a company that produced front of house displays for cinemas. Soon he moved to Weddell Brothers who produced film publicity materials and when their artist was called up for military service in 1940, Peffer replaced him, painting publicity images of Hollywood film stars.

In 1942 he was called up to serve in the Royal Navy during the Second World War. He saw action in Operation Pedestal, the convoys to Malta which was besieged by the Germans. He wrote of an attack on one convoy just after sunset:

Then they came. Little shapes in the distance, growing bigger as they approached the convoy. Every gun was cocked and ready. All hell broke loose as they began to dive and the ships began their fire. The noise was deafening, the guns pounding, the roaring of the engines as the dive-bombers screamed down at us. Bombs exploded all around, torpedoes were dropped as the Heinkels and Stukas came out of their dives. It was over quite quickly.

No ships were sunk in that attack, but later, a ship on which Peffer was serving was sunk by enemy action.

== 1950s and 60s ==
On leaving the Navy in January 1946, Peffer considered becoming a professional boxer, a sport in which he had ability, but instead decided to become a commercial artist. He attended a few evening classes at Hornsey School of Art in 1946 immediately after demob but otherwise learned his craft on the job. He worked for various firms in the film publicity business until eventually joining Pearl and Dean where he was in charge of the art department and knew John Vernon. He married Kitty (Kit) in 1949.

In 1954 or 55 Peffer went freelance. He was noticed by the Pan Books art buyer, Tony Bowen-Davies, and in the 1950s and 1960s painted hundreds of book covers, including from 1957 the Ian Fleming novels Casino Royale, Moonraker, From Russia with Love and Dr. No, all for Pan. He was paid about £40 for each one. The model for Bond was Dick Orme. Peffer also created covers for the publishers Arrow, Compact, Corgi, Digit and Panther, amongst others. The Pan paperbacks were selling up to one million copies annually at the time.

With the launch of the first Bond film, Dr. No in 1962, however, Pan chose to use film tie-in covers for future editions. This was part of a growing trend by British paperback publishers in the 1960s to use more photographic covers or to buy in "second rights" painted images from abroad. Sometimes the same image might appear on more than one book. Together with increased competition in painted covers from younger Italian artists like Renato Fratini, there was a general decline in cover work for artists like Peffer by the end of the 1960s.

== 1970s and 80s ==
In the 1970s and 1980s, Peffer increasingly turned to quad film posters and home video sleeve design. His breakthrough into this area came when another artist who had too much work recommended Peffer for the poster of Creatures of Evil/Blood Devils in 1971. Peffer then began a busy period until his retirement in 1985 producing around 200 film posters and a similar number of video sleeves as home video became popular slightly later.

Although his work was skilled, Peffer was not too fussy about which commissions he accepted, producing art for everything from Bruce Lee Kung Fu films to low budget "exploitation" films like Desires of a Nymphomaniac and posters for "video nasties" such as Mountain of the Cannibal God. He often worked for Stanley Long, known for his cheap 1970s British sex comedies, and Peffer described himself as the painter for "the raincoat brigade". Other commissions were for Flesh Gordon (1974), SS Experiment Camp (1976) and Mary Millington's True Blue Confessions (1980).

In 1980 he produced the cinema poster for Hussy, starring Helen Mirren and John Shea, and later presented the original artwork to Mirren. His original design is still in use on DVD releases of the film.

By the mid-1980s, film distributors and exhibitors were facing a crisis as audiences in the United Kingdom fell to the lowest level since the Second World War. Demand for traditional painted posters was declining as cinemas used different forms of promotion, printers were closing down and UK based executives of the old school were retiring. With low audiences, US distributors were reluctant to spend money on separate UK publicity campaigns. It was at this time, 1985, that Peffer retired. He described his last year in the business as "terrible – there was no work at all".

== Method ==
Peffer often modelled for his own covers, as did his wife Kitty and his brother-in-law Jack Cooper. Peffer described Jack as "a top stuntman", standing in for Robert Shaw and Errol Flynn. Peffer said he always read the book he was working on to understand the scenario. He signed all of his Pan and Panther work with the nickname Peff that he picked up while in the Royal Navy but tended to only sign the better work for other publishers.

== Personal life and autobiography ==
Peffer wrote his biography under the title "Peff" a life story, including details of his war service, but it remains unpublished. Extracts appear on the website sampeffer.com. He died on 14 March 2014 and was survived by Kitty.

== Collecting ==
The Pan paperback novels have become collectable and in 2005 The Guardian noted that first edition Bond paperbacks with Peffer artwork were some of those in the highest demand.

== See also ==
- Roger Hall (artist)
