= Bentley Heath, Hertfordshire =

Hamlet in Hertfordshire, England

Coordinates: 51.6806°N 0.1943458°W

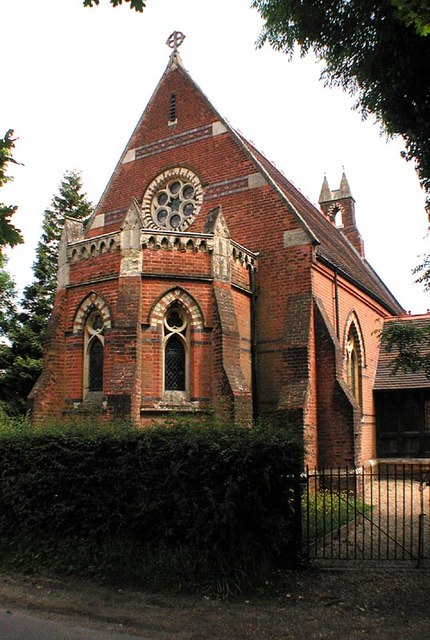
Holy Trinity

Bentley Heath is a hamlet in Hertfordshire, England, between Chipping Barnet and Potters Bar. It is on the north edge of the Wrotham Park estate with which it has traditionally been associated. Historically, it was in Middlesex.

The hamlet contains a number of listed buildings:

- Almshouses
- Bentley Heath Farm House and barn
- Elm Farm House
- Holy Trinity, a private chapel for the Wrotham Park estate
