= The Green Man, Potters Bar =

Public house in Potters Bar, England

Coordinates: 51°41′55″N 0°10′29″W

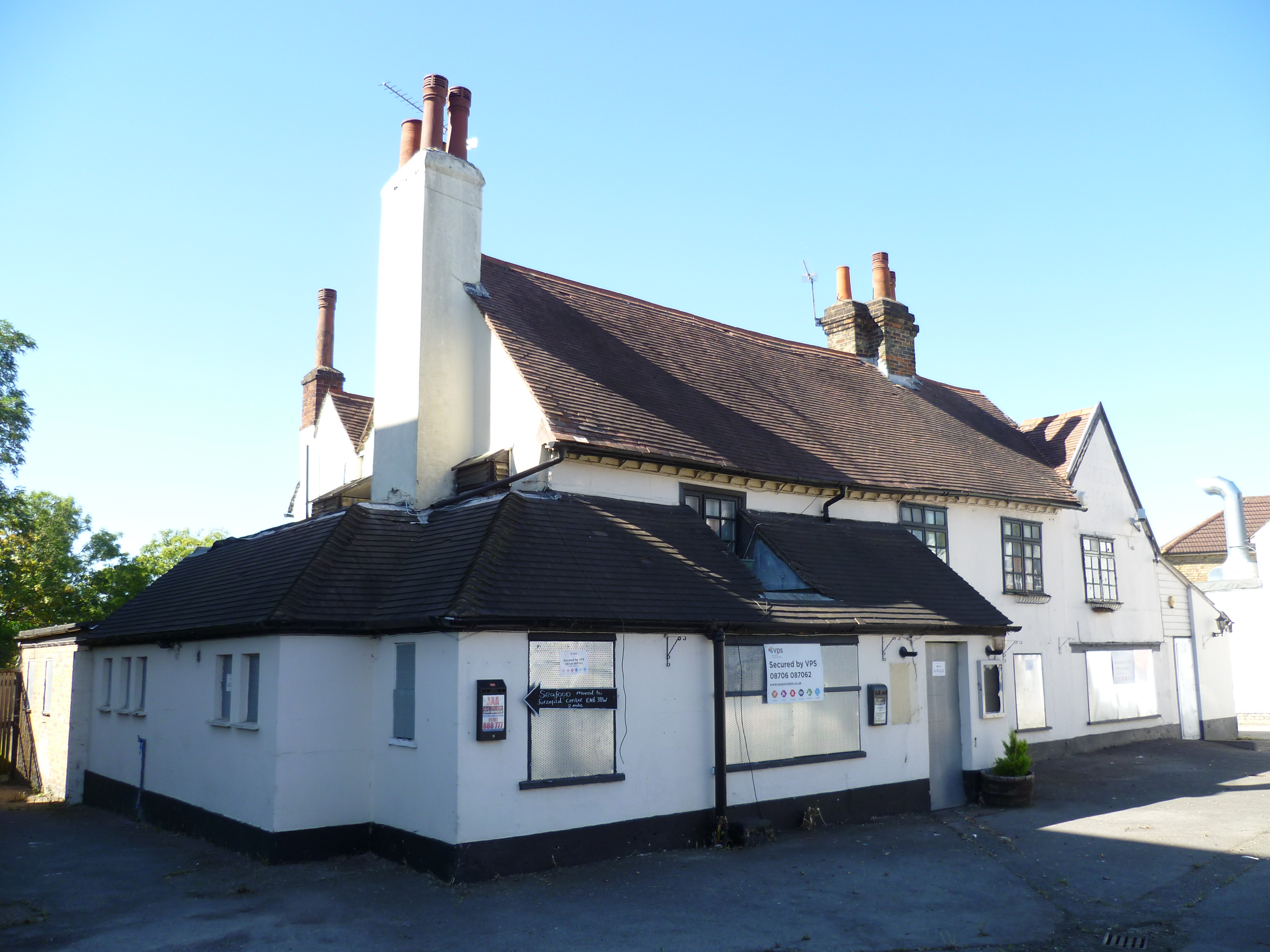
The Green Man

The Green Man is a disused public house in High Street, Potters Bar, England, and a Grade II listed building with Historic England. It was built in the mid 17th century, and subsequently remodelled and extended.

Plans to turn the site into a 46-bed care home were repeatedly rejected by the council in 2015 and 2016. In 2019 plans were agreed to convert the building into "a children’s nursery, or maybe a gym, or maybe a religious centre" and to build flats on the rear car park site.
