= Oakmere House =

House in Potters Bar, Hertfordshire, England

Coordinates: 51.6968°N 0.1746°W

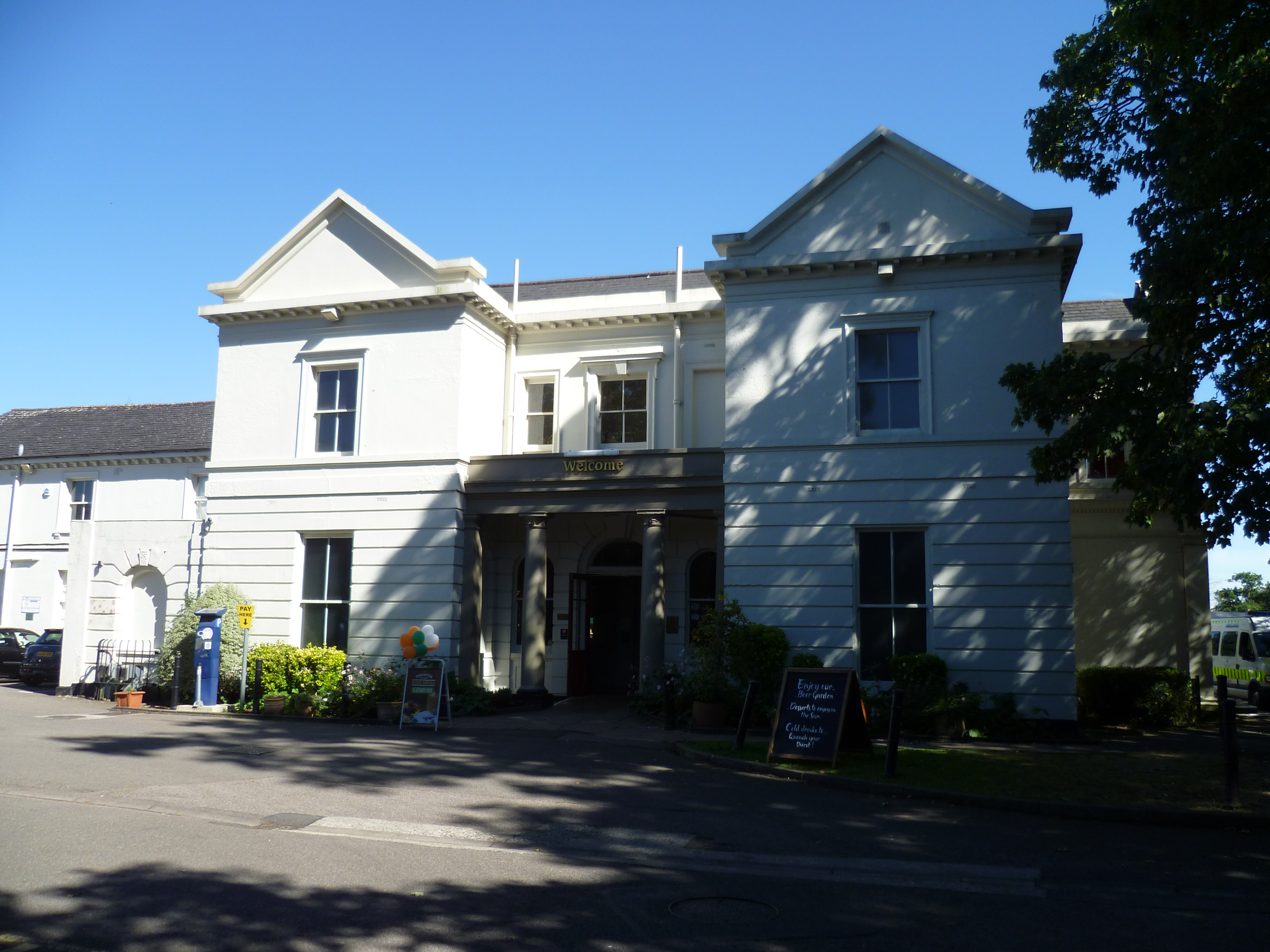
Oakmere House (front)

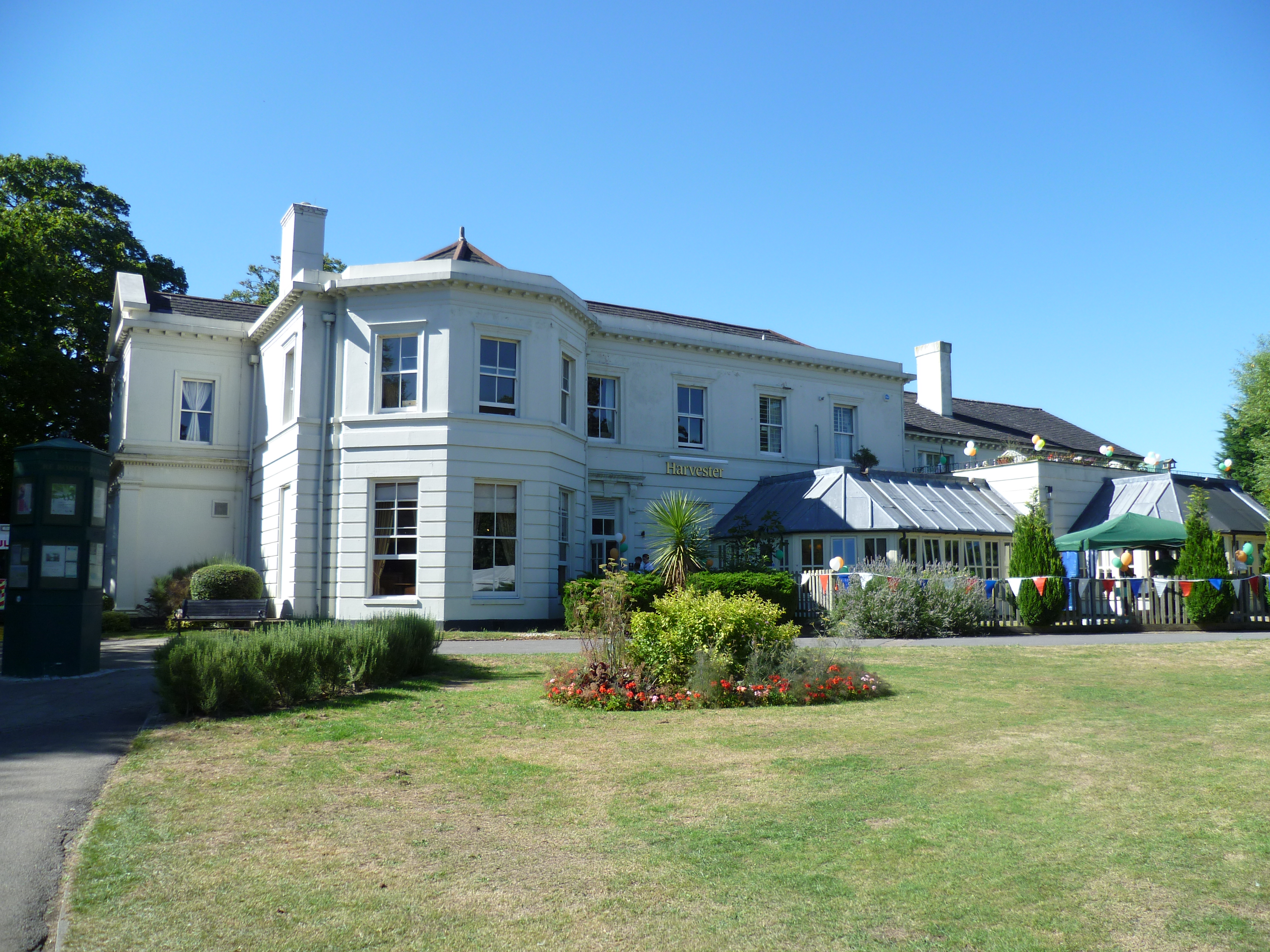
Oakmere House (rear)

Oakmere House is a public house and restaurant in Potters Bar, England, and a grade II listed building with Historic England. The pub is under the management of the Harvester company. The rear of the building faces onto Oakmere Park.

== The Carpenter family ==
Oakmere House was built in 1840 and at this time it was owned by William and Amelia Carpenter. Amelia Chauncy had received the land as a gift from her uncle at the time of her wedding in 1825 to Lieutenant Colonel William Leonard Carpenter. She was the daughter of Charles Snell Chauncy of Theobalds Park, Hertfordshire a wealthy landowner.

Lieutenant Colonel William Leonard Carpenter (1792–1861) was in the British Indian Army in the Bombay Establishment. He served there for about 18 years and in 1821 he retired. After he married Amelia Chauncy in 1825 the couple went to live at Potters Bar and later built Oakmere House. They had one daughter Margaret Amelia Carpenter (1826–1916). In 1844 she married Horatio Kemble and when William died in 1861 the property was inherited by her and thus passed into the Kemble family.

== The Kemble family ==
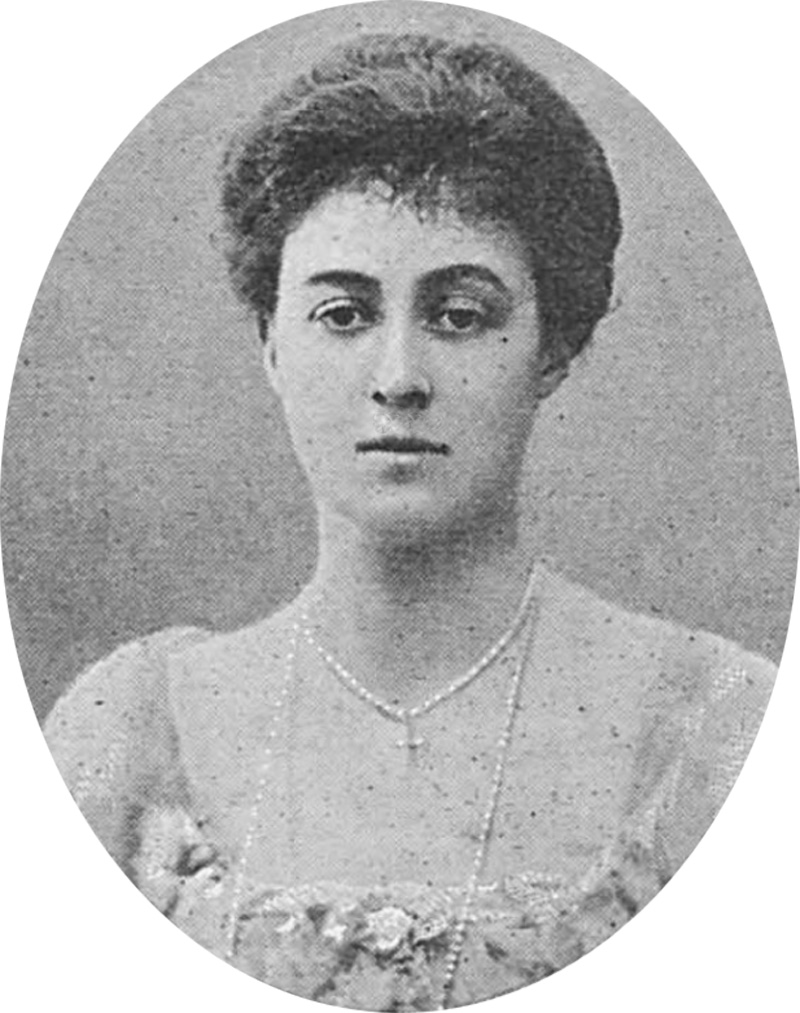
Lucinda Dorothea Kemble, later the Countess of Dunmore, daughter of Horace William Kemble, owner of Oakmere House

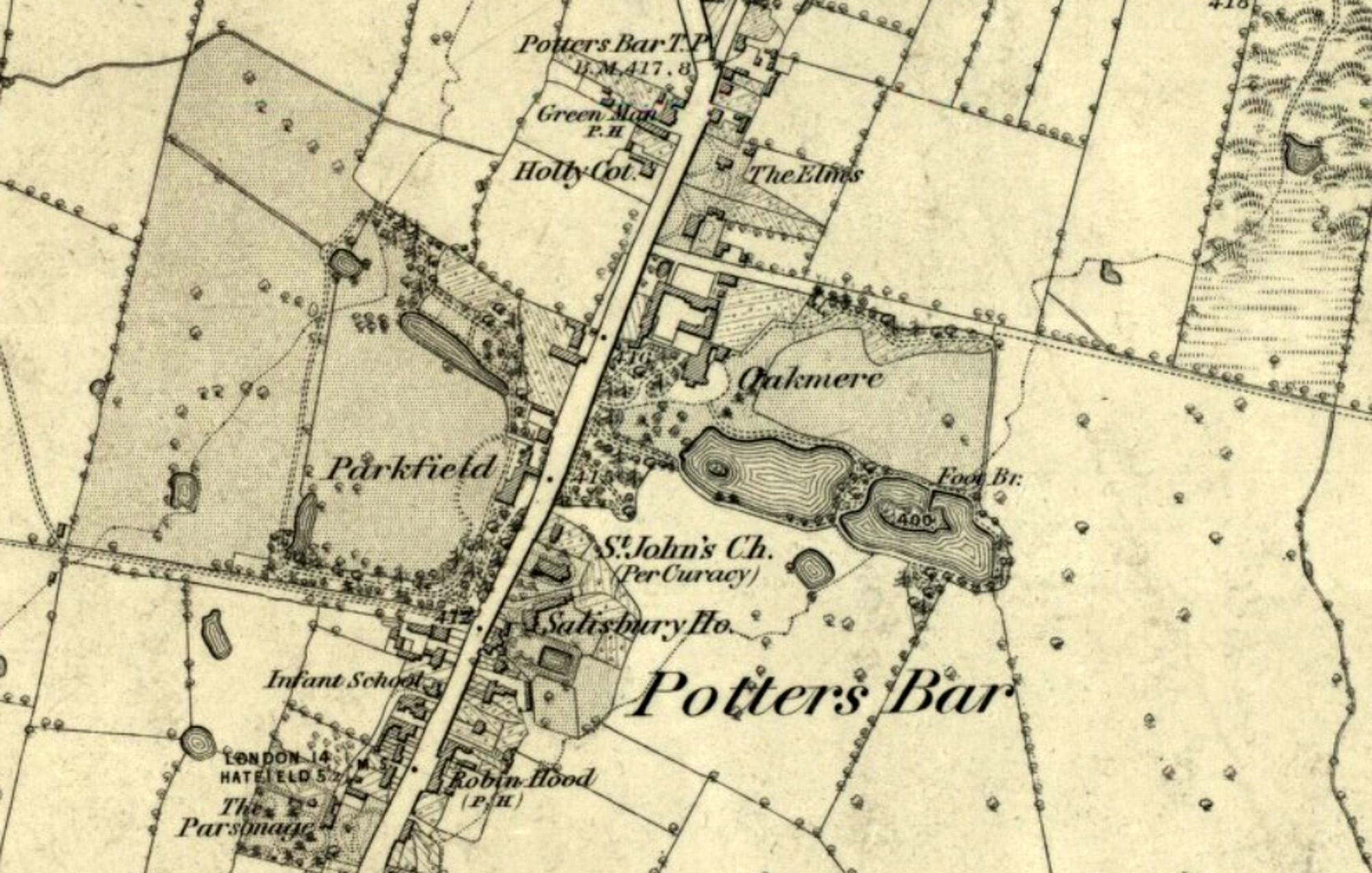
Map of Oakmere House in 1866

Horatio Kemble (1816–1890) was born in 1816. His father was Thomas Nash Kemble of Runwell Hall, Essex and Gobions Park, Hertfordshire. After he married Margaret in 1884 the couple lived at Banstead Park for some time. They had one son and two daughters. When William Carpenter died in 1861 they moved into Oakmere House and shortly after made alterations and additions to the building.

Horatio allowed the Potters Bar Horticultural Society to use the grounds of Oakmere House for the Annual Horticultural Show. When the Kemble family leased the house to Henry Lofts from 1885 until 1915 the practice continued during these years.

Henry Lofts (1828–1903) was a land and estate agent. He and his wife Mary had twelve children. The 1891 Census shows them living in Oakmere House with five of their children, a cook, two housemaids, a kitchenmaid and a footman. Mary died in 1896 and Henry and several children continued to live at the house until his death in 1903. After this his son Henry Fairlam Lofts took the lease of Oakmere House and lived there with his brother and two sisters until 1915.

From 1915 until 1936 Edith Marian Forbes (1845–1936) rented the house. She was the widow of William Forbes, a landed proprietor who had died in 1914. When Horatio Kemble died in 1890 his son Horace William Kemble (1854–1935) inherited Oakmere House. He and his wife Kythe Agatha Hanbury had three daughters and one son. Their eldest daughter was Lucinda Dorothea Kemble who in 1904 married Alexander Edward Murray, the Earl of Dunmore and became Lucinda, Countess of Dunmore. Her picture is shown.

When Horace William Kemble died in 1935 his son Horace Leonard Kemble inherited the house and two years later in 1937 sold it to Potters Bar Urban District Council.

== WW 1 Zeppelin crash ==
The L31 German Zeppelin fell on an old oak tree in the entrance of Wulstan Park after being shot down by Lieutenant Wulstan Tempest on 1 October 1916. His small plane was slightly damaged on landing back at his base, and he suffered a few injuries. He went next day to Oakmere Park, Potters Bar, to see what he had done the night before.

This famous zeppelin was captained by the German hero of the time, Heinrich Mathy. He and his 18-man crew were all killed, and buried in the Potters Bar cemetery until their bodies were transferred to Cannock Chase many years later.

The Potters Bar Museum has a section devoted to this important incident in the aerial battles over England. After the death of Mathy, zeppelin raids decreased.
