= Ethel Trew =

British headmistress

- Born: 24 April 1869; Oystermouth, Wales
- Died: 7 December 1948 (aged 79); Hatfield, Hertfordshire, England
- Known for: head of Queenswood School for 50 years

Ethel Trew (24 April 1869 – 7 December 1948) was a British headmistress.

== Life ==
Trew was born in Oystermouth in the Mumbles. Her parents were Ellen Mary (born Bradford). Her father was a merchant of different goods including at one time being a grocer. She became a teacher after leaving Manchester High School for Girls where she had lived in lodgings.

In 1894 she was teaching maths at the West Cornwall College where Marion Waller was the head. She was appointed to lead Queenswood School at its new location of Clapham Park in 1894. It was a Methodist school that had originally been "The Educational Home for the Daughters of Wesleyan Ministers" when it started in 1869. It had been founded by Marion's father David Waller and there was then 20 pupils. Trew decided to follow Waller becoming the Assistant Headmistress. Waller left to marry in 1897 and Trew reluctantly took her place. She knew that she gave up her own ambitions of a family to lead the school. She emphasised the work of John Ruskin and self control. The latter was said to be inspired by her own temper which she usually kept in check and she demonstrated its power and her hold over the school by successfully banning coughing in chapel.

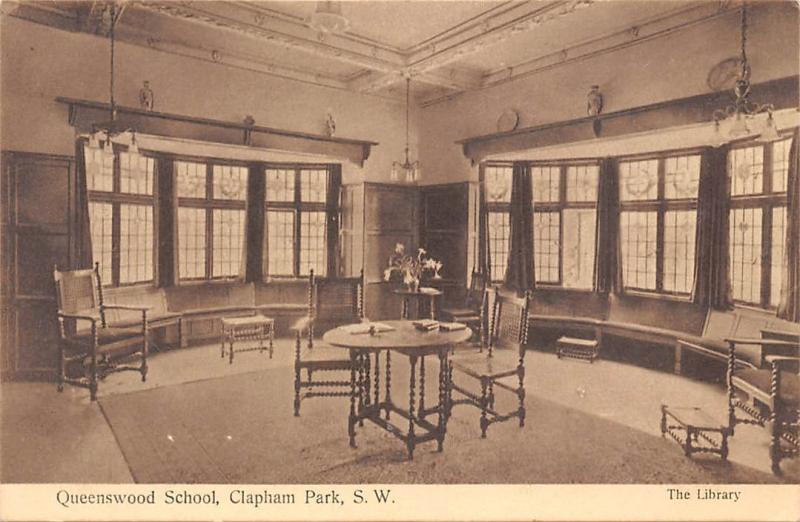
Queenswood school library by Percy Alex Buchanan

Under her leadership the school moved to Sheepwell House in Hatfield, Hertfordshire in 1925 and a preparatory school was established. The oversaw the building of the new school and she took a string interest in the chapel. The school planned for the future and Enid Essame was identified as her replacement and Essame was sent on a fact-finding sabbatical to the US in 1934.

The original school and the head's house was burnt down in 1936 and was replaced with a nearly identical building. Trew had many successes and school roll grew to 300 but she became out of touch and was said to be a "benevolent despot". She was devoted to the school and expected the staff to be devoted to her. In return she could be very supportive but she would also embarrass her staff by admonishing them in front of the pupils. She began to give up some of her control in 1944. That year the ceilings collapsed in her rooms when a German bomb was dropped. She was superseded by Enid "Emma" Essame when Baron Stamp was the chair of governors, but she refused to give up complete control. Essame, who had been a Queenswood teacher, served until 1971. Trew had built herself a home to retire to, but it was very close and on the school's estate. She oversaw the appointment of a new estate manager as she retained responsibly for the estate. The manager swindled the school. Trew had to finally retire in September 1948 and died in Hatfield that year.
