= Roger Hall (artist) =

British artist

Hall in 2005

Hall's cover for the Pan edition of Ian Fleming's Casino Royale, 1955. The first depiction of James Bond on a book cover.

Roger Hall (26 December 1914 – 9 December 2006) was a British artist who began his career painting publicity images for front of house displays in cinemas but later became a noted book illustrator and created the first depiction of James Bond on a book cover.

== Early life ==
Roger Hall [birth name Henry Walter Hall, but known as Roger] was born at St Barts Hospital, London, on 26 December 1914, and brought up in Islington. His father was a stoker at Wimbledon Power Station.

== Early career ==
Hall began his career aged 15 painting front of house displays for cinemas for the London Art Service. He progressed quickly and was eventually able to paint up to 20 portrait panels per week. By this time he felt he was due a pay rise but after the firm prevaricated, he moved to Art Display Services in Shaftesbury Avenue who produced hand-painted cut-out cinema foyer displays. In 1933, he created a 20 foot high portrait of the actor Charles Bickford made up of 12 plywood panels for display at the top of a cinema in Marble Arch.

== Military service ==
His career was interrupted when in 1941 he was called up to the British Army during the Second World War. He was demobbed in 1946.

== Pulford Publicity ==
In 1946, Hall joined Eric Pulford's Pulford Publicity where he started on £16 per week, a high salary then for a poster artist. Pulford, who Hall regarded as an excellent artist, had a background in printing and asked Hall to teach him new techniques such as painting in oils, which he did. He was based in Potters Bar from 1951. He stayed with Pulford Publicity until 1953 when he left after growing frustrated with Pulford's monopolisation of the design process. While there he produced up to three posters per week, and 200-300 in all, including his first quad poster for Fame is the Spur featuring a large portrait of the star, Michael Redgrave.

== Book illustration ==
After leaving Pulford Publicity, Hall began a career in book illustration, working first for Hutchinson producing hardback covers and later producing covers and illustrations for Ladybird Books and many notable post-war British paperback publishers such as Pan, Arrow, Corgi, and Mills & Boon. His work was in a variety of styles from pulp thrillers to illustrations for children's books. For Ladybird he produced illustrations for Cooking with Mother and The Story of our Canals, along with 14 books in the "Famous People" series. He painted internal illustrations for the Hardy Boys mysteries.

In 1955, he painted the cover for the Pan paperback edition of Ian Fleming's Casino Royale, which was the first James Bond paperback and the first depiction of Bond on a book cover.

== Other work ==
In 1952 or 1953, he painted his Portrait of Sir John Barbirolli which was later given to the Royal Academy of Music by Lady Barbirolli. In the 1960s he produced up to 12 film posters for Geoff Wright before handing the work on to Sam Peffer in 1971.

== Personal life ==
Hall lived in Santers Lane, Potter's Bar, in the 1960s. He had a wife, Florence, who was known as Sue. He also had a daughter, Cherry. In 1986, he moved to Spain where he held three exhibitions, but returned to England in 2003 where he settled in Gloucestershire and continued to paint. He died in Tetbury on 9 December 2006.
