= List of King George V Playing Fields in Hertfordshire =

Hertfordshire
Location	Formal name	Local name (if any)	National Grid Reference	Dates		External links
Location	Formal name	Local name (if any)	National Grid Reference	Purchase	Opening	External links
Borehamwood	King George V Playing Field	Kenilworth Park	TL 237 246			View north towards an avenue of Lombardy Poplar trees and a distribution depot
Potters Bar	King George V Playing Field	Furzefield	TL 240 019			Hertsmere Borough Council
Stevenage	King George V Playing Fields	Cricket Ground/KGs	TQ 205 966			King George V Playing Fields
Hitchin	King George V Playing Field	Hitchin Rugby Football Club	TL 1811 3053	1935		North Hertfordshire District Council
Watford	King George V Playing Fields		TQ 098 948			
Welwyn Garden City						
