= Queenswood School =

Location
- Brookmans Park; Hatfield, Hertfordshire, AL9 6NS; England; 51°42′54″N 0°09′59″W

Information
- Type: Private school Day and boarding
- Motto: In Hortis Reginae (“In Queens’ Gardens”)
- Religious affiliation: Methodist
- Established: 1894
- Local authority: Hertfordshire
- Principal: Joanna Cameron
- Gender: Girls
- Age: 11 to 18
- Enrolment: 430
- Houses: 4
- Colours: Purple, grey House colours: Red, Green, Yellow, Blue
- Publication: The Queenswoodian Magazine
- Former pupils: Old Queenswoodians
- Website: www.queenswood.org

Queenswood School is a girls-only Methodist private school located near Hatfield, Hertfordshire, twenty miles from London. It offers admission at ages 11, 13 or 16 (for sixth form).

== History ==
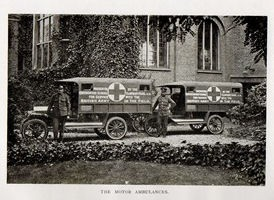
Two Queenswood School ambulances in Salonika

The school's origins were with "The Educational Home for the Daughters of Wesleyan Ministers" founded in Clapton, London in 1869. After a transfer to Clapham Park the school reopened with its current name in 1894. The head was Marion Waller and she was the daughter of the school's founder David Waller. Marion Waller arrived with Ethel Trew as her assistant. Waller left to marry in 1897 and Trew was persuaded to give up her own ambitions to lead the school. During the first world war the school raised money to fund an ambulance that was sent to Salonika.

Under Trew's leadership the school moved to Sheepwell House in Hatfield, Hertfordshire in 1925 and a preparatory school was established. The original school and the head's house was burnt down in 1936 and was replaced with a nearly identical building. Trew had many successes but took too many years to retire in 1944. She was superseded by Enid "Emma" Essame who had many hours planning the school's future with Baron Stamp, the chair of governors. Essame had been identified as the head designate in the early 1930s and she had turned down other offers in the long wait for Trew to retire. Essame was inspiring to the school's supporters and new money was found to support the school. A new science block and library were added in 1957. Essame served until 1971 and she was succeeded by Margaret Ritchie. In 1981 she in her turn was succeeded by Audrey Butler who had been educated at Queenswood.

== Name ==
The name "Queenswood" along with the school's motto "in hortis reginæ" (In Queens’ Gardens) pays tribute to John Ruskin (1819–1900) who was a champion of female education and women's place in society. In 1865 he published a lecture "Of Quenns' Gardens" on which the name and motto were based. The lecture was one of a series "Sesame and Lilies" delivered in December 1864.

== Pastoral care ==
As Queenswood is a Methodist school, all girls are required to attend chapel services. Special services are held to welcome new girls and farewell upper sixth leavers.

The tutor system is a key part of the school's pastoral care. Girls are organised into small groups and assigned to a tutor or their housemistress.

=== House system ===
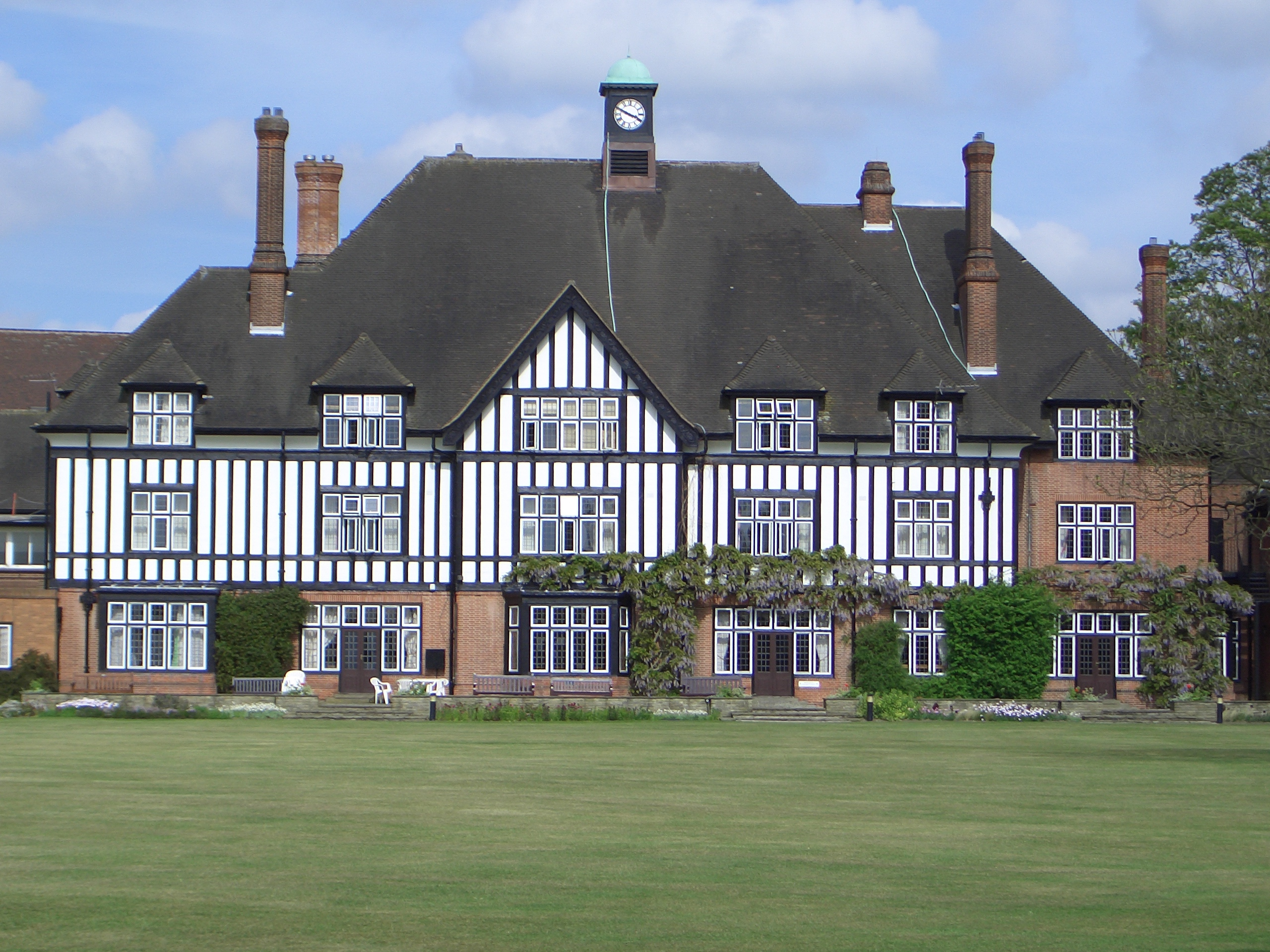
Trew House

Girls in years 7 and 8 belong to Stamp House, which accommodates up to 45 boarders.

In year 7, girls are randomly allocated to one of the four houses but will only switch when they enter year 9.

- Hartley
- Clapham North
- Clapham South
- Waller

== Notable former pupils ==
- Naomi Cavaday, tennis player
- Sally Ann Howes (1930–2021), actress and singer
- Helen McCrory (1968–2021), actress
- Muriel Nissel (1921–2010), statistician and civil servant
- Natalie Pinkham, television and radio presenter
- Alison Richard, former Vice-Chancellor of Cambridge University
- Elizabeth Sellars (1921–2019), actress
- Carol Thatcher, daughter of Prime Minister Margaret Thatcher
- Georgie Thompson, television presenter
