= Social Trends =

British survey

Social Trends was a major British annual social and economic survey.

== History ==
In 1967, Muriel Nissel and Claus Moser started work on "a national survey analysing trends in social welfare", that was to become Social Trends, first published in 1970, and considered to be the "statistician's bible". Nissel edited Social Trends until 1975, when she began work on the "distribution and redistribution of wealth". Publication ceased in 2010.

== Production ==
It was produced annually by the Office for National Statistics in the United Kingdom. It gathers social and economic data from many governmental and other sources to form a comprehensive picture of how British society is at the moment and how it has changed over time. It also gives analysis of this information.

Although an annual production, different sections were published in three groups throughout the year.

=== Transition from printed version to the website ===
It was published on the Web for free and also in print form. From 2009, sections of the report would only be available from the website. This was a phased transition to complete publication only on the website.

== Scope ==
It covers various different topics and policy areas e.g. housing, crime, income and wealth, transport, population.

== See also ==
- British Social Attitudes Survey
- British Crime Survey
