= Potters Bar =

Town in Hertfordshire, England

Coordinates: 51.698°N 0.183°W

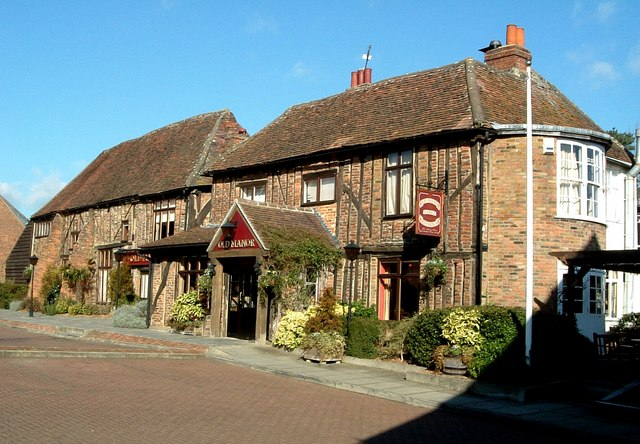
- The Old Manor, Potters Bar

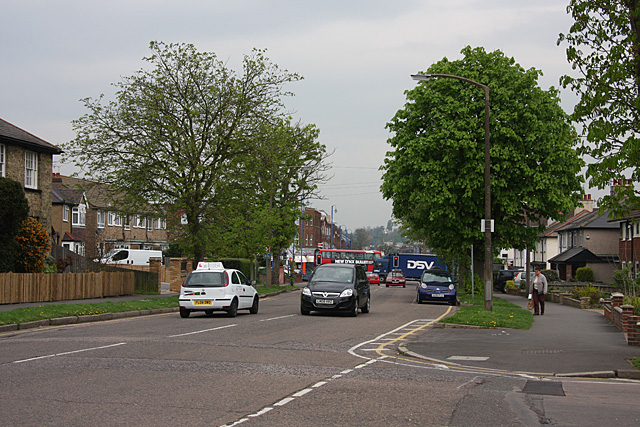
- Baker Street

- Location within Hertfordshire
- Population: 22,536 2021 Census
- OS grid reference: TL255015
- District: Hertsmere
- Shire county: Hertfordshire
- Region: East
- Country: England
- Sovereign state: United Kingdom
- Post town: POTTERS BAR
- Postcode district: EN6
- Dialling code: 01707
- Police: Hertfordshire
- Fire: Hertfordshire
- Ambulance: East of England
- UK Parliament: Hertsmere

Potters Bar is a town in Hertfordshire, England, 13 miles (21 km) north of central London. In 2011, it had a population of 21,882. (Note: This excludes a county ward which takes its name from the historic ecclesiastical parish but which contains Ridge and South Mimms; population 4,573 (2011).) In the 2021 census, the four wards that make up Potters Bar – Bentley Heath & The Royds, Furzefield, Oakmere and Parkfield – had a combined population of 22,536; this includes several smaller outlying hamlets contained in the Bentley Heath & The Royds ward, such as Bentley Heath and Ganwick Corner. In 2022, the population was around 23,325.

Within the historic county of Middlesex until 1965, the town dates to the early 13th century but remained a small, mainly agricultural, settlement until the arrival of the Great Northern Railway in 1850. It is now part of the London commuter belt.

== Etymology ==
The origin of the Potters element of the town's name is uncertain; it is generally thought to be either a reference to a Roman pottery, believed to have been sited locally, or alternatively to the Pottere family who lived in neighbouring South Mimms parish.

The Bar is thought to refer to the gates leading from the South Mimms parish and into the Enfield Chase parish; it could possibly hail from a toll on the Great North Road, said to have been by what is now the disused Green Man pub or at the current entrance to Morven House.

== History ==
Potters Bar is located on the Great North Road, one of two road routes from the City of London to the north of England. The road was originally numbered as the A1 and later the A1000.

Potters Bar was historically part of Middlesex and formed the Potters Bar Urban District of that county from 1934. From 1894 to 1934 its area had formed the South Mimms Rural District. In 1965, the district was transferred to Hertfordshire County Council, while most of the rest of Middlesex County Council became part of Greater London.

The urban district covered an area of 6,129 acres (24.80 km^{2}). In 1939, it had a population of 13,681, increasing to 24,613 in 1971. In 1974, the urban district was abolished and the area became part of the borough of Hertsmere. Having been part of Middlesex, the area continued to form part of the Metropolitan Police District; with the creation of the Greater London Authority, it was transferred to the Hertfordshire Constabulary in 2000.

=== Byng family ===
Wrotham Park estate, home of the Byng family, sits within Potters Bar and Barnet on 2,500 acres of land. The Byng family still own a lot of land in the Potters Bar area; The Admiral Byng pub in Darkes Lane is named after Admiral John Byng, who was executed for failing to obey orders in the Minorca campaign.

=== Zeppelin L31 ===
In the early hours of 1 October 1916, Lieutenant Wulstan Tempest shot down Germany's most famous zeppelin, the L31. It was captained by Heinrich Mathy and had a crew of 19. All were killed when the flaming zeppelin fell into an ancient oak tree on the Oakmere Estate, Oakmere House at the time being rented by Mrs Forbes. The deadly raids over England declined after this. The 19 German sailors (zeppelins were naval) were buried in the local cemetery and, decades later, reinterred at Cannock Chase German Military Cemetery. The Potters Bar Museum has a Zeppelin display, with relics of the L31.

=== Train accidents ===
There have been three fatal railway accidents at Potters Bar. In 1899, the Earl of Strafford was killed at the station when, according to witnesses, he appeared to step out in front of an express train. In 1946, signals were passed at danger causing derailment and the death of two passengers. In 2002, while passing through the station, a northbound train derailed at high speed, killing seven and injuring 76. In the aftermath of the tragedy, private maintenance firms were accused of neglecting training and safety, and in 2003, Network Rail announced it was taking all track maintenance in-house.

== Demographics ==
As of the 2021 census, Potters Bar still had a Christian majority, making it more Christian than both England and Wales as a whole and the rest of Hertsmere. Potters Bar has a significant Jewish community and an Orthodox synagogue but, as a percentage of the overall population, the Jewish community, which numbers over 600, pales in comparison to every other settlement in Hertsmere, the most Jewish borough in the country.

Area	All people	Christian (%)	Buddhist (%)	Hindu (%)	Jewish (%)	Muslim (%)	Sikh (%)	Other (%)	No religion (%)	Not stated (%)
England and Wales	56,490,048	46.3	0.5	1.8	0.5	6.7	0.9	0.6	36.7	6.0
Potters Bar	22,536	52.33	0.56	4.22	2.76	4.13	0.16	1.17	28.34	6.34

== Geography ==
=== Climate ===
Potters Bar experiences an oceanic climate (Köppen climate classification Cfb) similar to almost all of the United Kingdom.

Climate data for Potters Bar
Month	Jan	Feb	Mar	Apr	May	Jun	Jul	Aug	Sep	Oct	Nov	Dec	Year
Mean daily maximum °C (°F)	8 (46)	9 (48)	12 (54)	14 (57)	18 (64)	21 (70)	23 (73)	23 (73)	20 (68)	16 (61)	11 (52)	8 (46)	15 (59)
Mean daily minimum °C (°F)	5 (41)	5 (41)	6 (43)	8 (46)	10 (50)	13 (55)	15 (59)	16 (61)	13 (55)	11 (52)	8 (46)	5 (41)	10 (50)
Average precipitation mm (inches)	50.7 (2.00)	39.9 (1.57)	31.7 (1.25)	46.2 (1.82)	38.9 (1.53)	46.4 (1.83)	33.1 (1.30)	43.6 (1.72)	49.7 (1.96)	70.7 (2.78)	58.1 (2.29)	56.9 (2.24)	565.9 (22.28)

== Transport ==
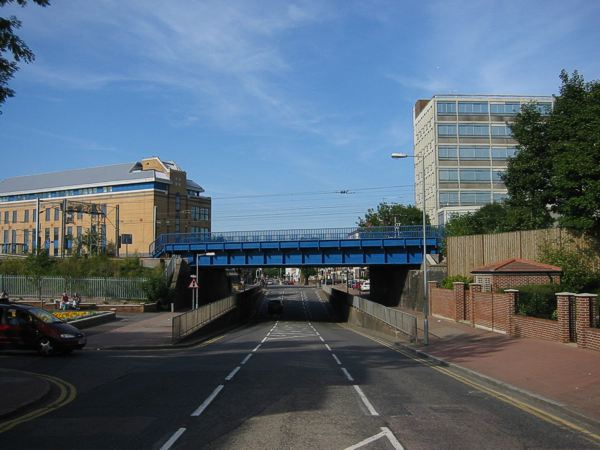
Darkes Lane, looking north towards the railway bridge

=== Roads ===
The A1 was built as a major arterial road and a crossroads at Bignells Corner linked it to the Barnet–St Albans road. Potters Bar is now also served by junctions 23 and 24 of the M25 motorway.

=== Railway ===
Potters Bar railway station is sited on the East Coast Main Line. GTR operates services on the Great Northern Route under two sub-brands:

- Great Northern:
  - Cambridge, Letchworth and Stevenage to London King's Cross
  - Welwyn Garden City to Moorgate
- Thameslink, at peak hours only:
  - Welwyn Garden City to Sevenoaks, via St Pancras International, London Blackfriars and Catford.

Potters Bar was the location of two major rail accidents in 1946 and 2002.

The nearest London Underground station is at Cockfosters, on the Piccadilly line; it is approximately 2.5 miles (4.0 km) south on the A111 from junction 24 of the M25.

=== Buses ===
Potters Bar has a bus depot owned by Metroline that services London bus routes. Key routes include:

Route number	Route	Operation	Operator
84	St. Albans St Peters Street to Potters Bar Station, via the High Street	Daily	Sullivan Buses
242	Potters Bar Station or Welham Green Station to Waltham Cross Bus Station	Daily	Uno/Central Connect
243	Barnet to Hatfield	Mon-Sat	Uno
298	Potters Bar Railway Station to Arnos Grove tube station, via Cockfosters	Daily	Uno
305	Potters Bar Railway Station or Bus Garage to St. Albans St. Peter's Street or Sandridge	Mon-Sat	Centrebus
313	Potters Bar station to Chingford station, via Enfield	Daily	Metroline
398	Potters Bar station to Borehamwood or Watford, via South Mimms	Mon-Fri	Sullivan Buses
PB1	Circular via Shillitoe Avenue, Potters Bar station, High Street and Oakmere	Mon-Sat	Centrebus

== Places of Worship ==
There are eight churches in Potters Bar. The first Anglican parish in the town was carved out of the parish of South Mimms in 1835. Its church was dedicated to St John and was in a neo-Norman style, located in the southern corner of Oakmere Park, where the War Memorial now stands; however, its experimental concrete construction didn't last well and it had to be replaced by the current parish church of St Mary the Virgin and All Saints' Church at the top of the Walk. (The concrete church survived as an ivy-clad ruin into the 1970s.) St Mary's contains stained glass including some "fine portraits" of several saints as well as tributes to John Keble, and Randall Davidson. There is a Madonna Window in memory of John Goodacre, a long-time schoolmaster at Potters Bar.

Other churches include Our Lady and St Vincent (Roman Catholic); King Charles the Martyr, another parish that was carved out of South Mimms, designed by Frederick Charles Eden; Christ Church, Little Heath on the Great North Road; Potters Bar Baptist Church; St John's Methodist Church in Baker Street; Causeway Free Church; and Potters Bar Spiritualist Church on Hill Rise.

Former religious buildings include: a Christadelphian Hall behind shops at 130 Darkes Lane; a Salvation Army citadel in Station Road; the Roman Catholic church of St Vincent de Paul and Louise Demarillac in Barnet Road, designed by the distinguished church architect F. X. Velarde, demolished circa 2010; and a Quaker meeting in Quaker's Lane.

Non-Christian religions are represented by the Jain Temple at the Oshwal Centre between Potters Bar and Northaw, which "recreates a general Māru-Gurjara aesthetic".

== Education ==
There are six primary and infant state schools in Potters Bar and the surrounding area; they are Cranborne School, Ladbrooke JMI, Little Heath Primary, Oakmere Primary, Pope Paul RC Primary and Wroxham School.

Mount Grace School is a mixed grant maintained School which opened in 1954.

Lochinver house school is an all-boys preparatory school which opened in 1947.

Stormont School is an all-girls preparatory school which opened in 1944.

Dame Alice Owen's School is a mixed grant-maintained school. Founded in 1613 and based in Islington until 1973, it is unusual in its 'Visitation' and 'Beer Money' traditions.

The town also houses many veterinary medicine (mostly third, fourth and fifth-year) students from the Royal Veterinary College.

== Sport, entertainment and recreation ==
Potters Bar has a King George's Field in memorial to King George V, which is situated behind the Furzefield Centre. There is a swimming pool and leisure centre run by Hertsmere council, which is home to St Albans and Hertsmere Canoe Club. Also in the town are Potters Bar Town F.C., Potters Bar Swimming Club (PBSC), a Scuba diving Club (the Potters Bar Sub Aqua Club), a tennis club, a cricket club. The Wyllyotts Centre is a theatre, cinema and events venue, and is also the location of the town's museum. Potters Bar is also home to the Hertfordshire Showband (formally known as the Marching Blues).

In December 2018, the golf course at Potters Bar closed after 95 years.

In 1983, the area around Potters Bar was used for the on-location filming of the comic-horror film Bloodbath at the House of Death. In 2005, David Walliams and Matt Lucas shot two scenes for the third season of the comedy Little Britain: one scene at Mount Grace School gym and the other at a wedding shop on the High Street. Potters Bar is also home to a performing arts school, Top Hat Stage School, which has been running classes at Elm Court Community Centre since 1994.

The Ritz Cinema in Darkes Lane at the corner of Byng Drive was designed and built by cinema entrepreneur Major W. J. King in a modernist-cum-Art Deco style. It opened in 1934 and had a Compton organ in front of the curtain, on a pneumatic lift. The cinema closed in 1967 and was immediately demolished for the construction of a supermarket, now relocated.

There is a farmers market in Potters Bar in the spring and summer months every first Sunday 10am–2pm, at the Revive Gym.

== Notable residents ==
- Amanda Abbington, actress best known for her roles as Josie Mardle in Mr Selfridge and Mary Morstan in Sherlock
- Edward Appleton, Nobel Prize-winning physicist, lived in Darkes Lane
- Acker Bilk, clarinetist, divided his time between Pensford, Somerset and Potters Bar
- Basil Blackett, World War I flying ace, born in Potters Bar
- Bernard Bresslaw, actor and comedian best known for his roles in the Carry On film franchise
- Phillip Scott Burge, World War I flying ace, born in Potters Bar
- Bernard Butler, musician, record producer and guitarist in Suede
- Spencer Davis, musician and founder of the Spencer Davis Group, whose hits included "Gimme Some Lovin'" and "Keep On Running"
- Letitia Dean, actress (best known as Sharon Watts in EastEnders), born in Potters Bar
- John Ellis, theoretical physicist who proposed how to discover the Higgs boson and the gluon, grew up in Potters Bar
- Roger Fenton, Crimean war photographer who lived at Mount Grace manor house
- Martin Freeman, actor best known for his roles in The Office, Sherlock and The Hobbit film trilogy
- Mick Greenwood, musician and producer, born in Potters Bar
- John Griffin, businessman, founder of cab and courier company Addison Lee
- Mavis Doriel Hay, author of detective fiction and non-fiction, born in Potters Bar
- Roger Hall, artist and illustrator, created the first published depiction of James Bond for the cover of Casino Royale (1955)
- Ann Hogarth, puppeteer and operator of Muffin the Mule (the star of the BBC's first children's programme)
- Tony Jacklin, golfer, whose home golf club was Potters Bar Golf Club
- James Kaye, cricketer and lieutenant colonel in the British Indian Army, born in Potters Bar
- Henri Lansbury, former professional footballer, grew up in Potters Bar
- Thomas Law, actor (notable for EastEnders and The World's End), born in Potters Bar
- Terry Lightfoot, jazz musician, born in Potters Bar
- Arnold Lynch, engineer and part of the team that designed the first electronic computer, Colossus, at Bletchley Park
- Cedric Lynch, inventor of the Lynch motor, which powered the winning motorcycle in the world’s first zero carbon race
- Iain Macleod, politician, Secretary of State for the Colonies and Chancellor of the Exchequer, lived on The Causeway
- Jake Marlowe (1997–2023), musician, bassist of the hardcore band Desolated
- Clive Martin, businessman and Lord Mayor of London from 1999 to 2000
- Ian Masters, songwriter and founding member of the Pale Saints, born in Potters Bar
- Fortunino Matania, artist and war illustrator, lived in Darkes Lane
- Jimmy McCulloch, lead guitarist for Wings, lived in Potters Bar as a teenager with bandmates from One in a Million
- Thomas Meehan, botanist and nurseryman, born in Potters Bar
- Ambika Mod, actress best known for her roles in the BBC drama series This Is Going to Hurt and the Netflix miniseries One Day
- Muriel Nissel, statistician and civil servant, founding editor of the "statistician's bible" Social Trends
- Lemar (Lemar Obika), singer-songwriter and Brit Award winner known for singles such as "If There's Any Justice"
- Harry Olmer, dentist and Holocaust survivor, appointed MBE for his work in Holocaust education
- Peter Partner, historian of medieval Rome and the Middle East, born in Little Heath
- Leopold Partridge, athlete who competed in the 1924 Summer Olympics, born in Potters Bar
- Michael Perham, sailor who became the youngest person to sail across the Atlantic and to sail around the world single-handedly
- Tom Pett, professional footballer, born in Potters Bar
- Shane Rimmer, actor, notable as the voice of Scott Tracy in the original Thunderbirds series
- Peter Sallis, actor, the original voice of Wallace in the Wallace & Gromit films and Norman "Cleggy" Clegg in Last of the Summer Wine
- Dolly Shepherd, parachutist and entertainer, born in Potters Bar
- John Stonehouse, politician and Postmaster General who famously faked his own death in 1974
- Scott Sutter, former professional footballer, grew up in Potters Bar
- Storm Thorgerson, graphic designer best known for designing Pink Floyd's The Dark Side of the Moon album cover, born in Potters Bar
- Kenny Wax, theatrical producer, appointed MBE for services to charity and the arts
- Nicholas Wisdom, cricketer and businessman, born in Potters Bar
- Johnny Wright, Olympic boxing silver medallist, known as the "Pride of Potters Bar"
- Paul Young, musician known for international hits such as "Every Time You Go Away" and his UK chart-topping debut album No Parlez

== Twinnings ==
Potters Bar is twinned with:

- Viernheim, Germany
- Franconville, Val-d'Oise, France (since 1973)
